= Wheel of Sheffield =

Tourist attraction in Sheffield, Yorkshire

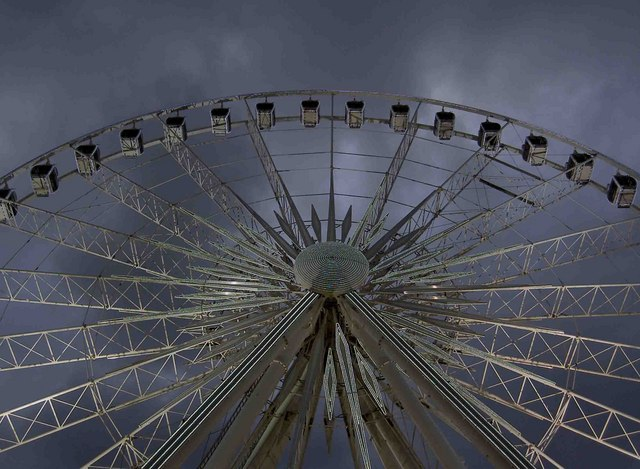
- A view of the wheel
- Interactive map of the Wheel of Sheffield area

General information
- Status: Dismantled; relocated to Hyde Park, London
- Type: Ferris wheel
- Location: Fargate, Sheffield, England
- Coordinates: 53.3810°N 1.4699°W
- Completed: 20 July 2009
- Demolished: November 2010

Height
- Height: 60 m (197 ft)

The Wheel of Sheffield was a 60-metre (197 ft) tall transportable Ferris wheel installation on Fargate, by City Hall, in Sheffield, England. It first appeared from July 2009 until November 2010 when it was moved on to London.

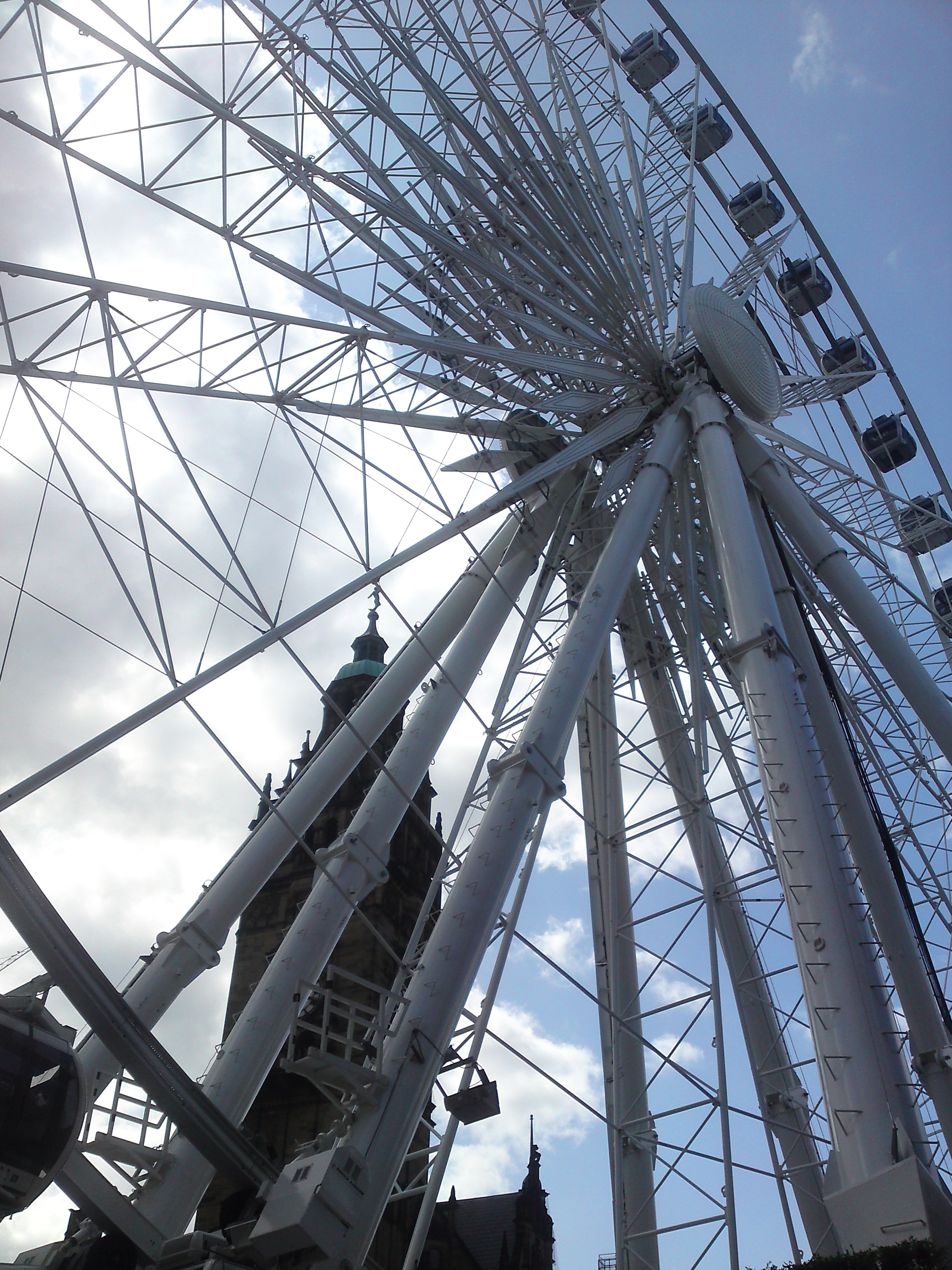
A view of the wheel from below

It opened on 20 July 2009, and was intended to remain until January 2010. However, planning permission was sought for a further year of operation, and permission was granted for it to remain until January 2011. This date was brought forward to October 2010, when the operator announced plans to dismantle the wheel and relocate it to Hyde Park, London. The Wheel of Sheffield closed on 31 October 2010, and it was completely dismantled by November 2010.

It had 42 passenger cars, each with an 8-person capacity, and was operated by World Tourist Attractions. One revolution on the wheel took around 13 minutes. It also featured a commentary pointing out local landmarks and places of interest.
