= Royal Windsor Wheel =

Coordinates: 51.4845°N 0.6119°W

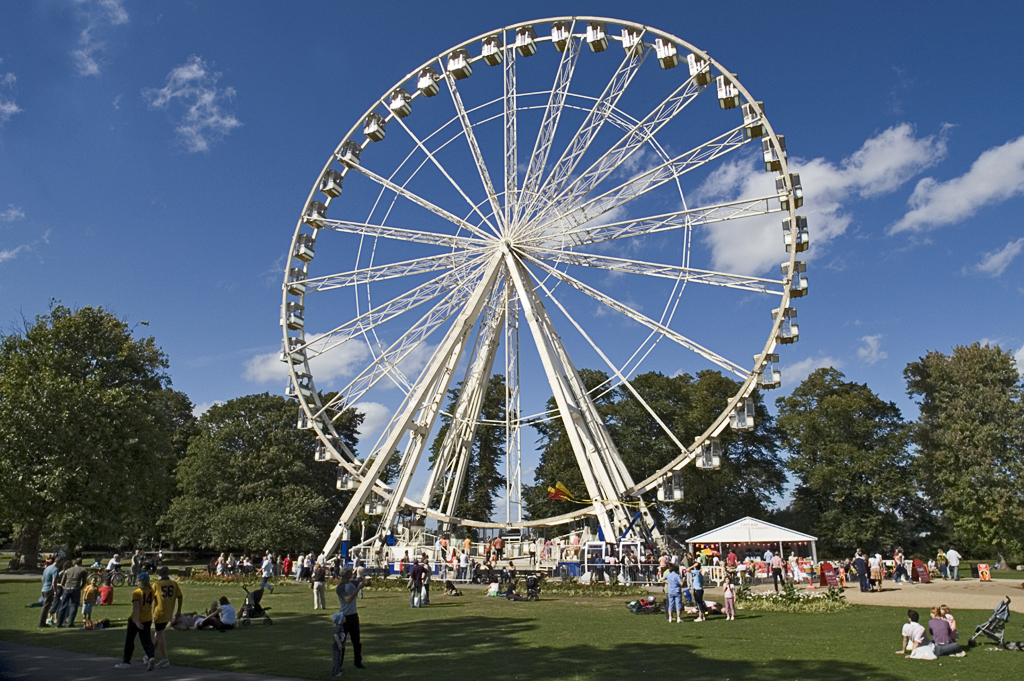
Alexandra Gardens Windsor Wheel (2006–2012)

The Royal Windsor Wheel is a non-permanent transportable Ferris wheel installation at Alexandra Gardens, Windsor, Berkshire, England.

== First wheel (2006–2012) ==
The first Royal Windsor Wheel first operated in 2006. In 2009 it operated from April to October and carried over 200,000 passengers. During 2010, it opened daily from 10 am to 10 pm, from 1 May until 30 August.

In 2011, the official website stated that the 365-tonne (402-ton) wheel had 40 six-person gondolas, including one VIP gondola and one disabled access gondola, offering views from a height of 60 metres (200 ft).

It ceased operations in 2012.

== Second wheel (2024) ==
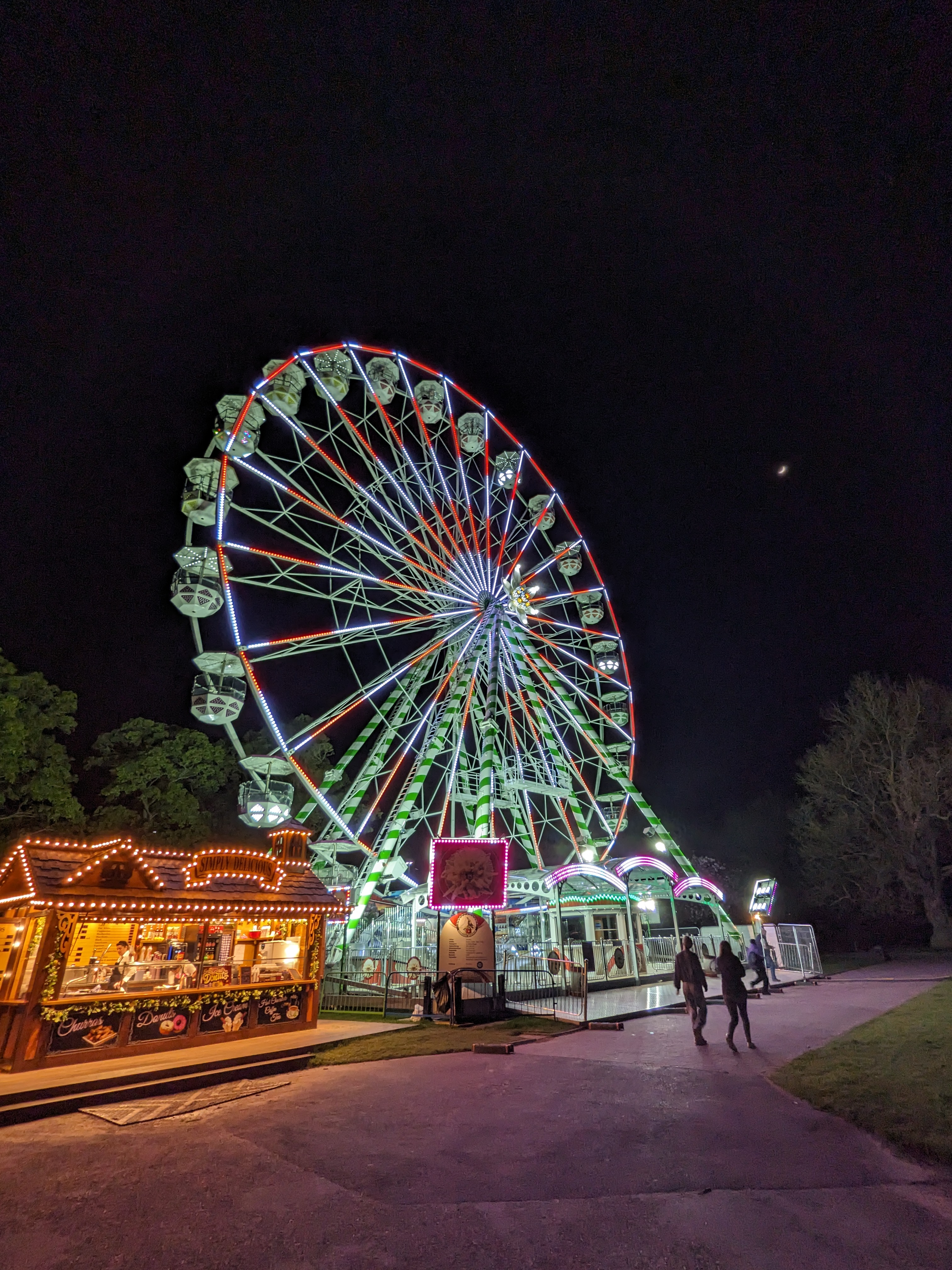
The second wheel illuminated at night

In July 2021 a new company (Roses Pleasure Parks Limited) applied to the local council to build a smaller wheel near the original site.

On 5 January 2024 it was announced that a 35-metre (115 ft) wheel would operate in Alexandra Gardens from 22 March to 2 September. Some councillors complained that the wheel would disrupt the park.
