= Steiger Ferris Wheel =

External image
- Steiger Ferris Wheel immediately after its collapse in October 2010

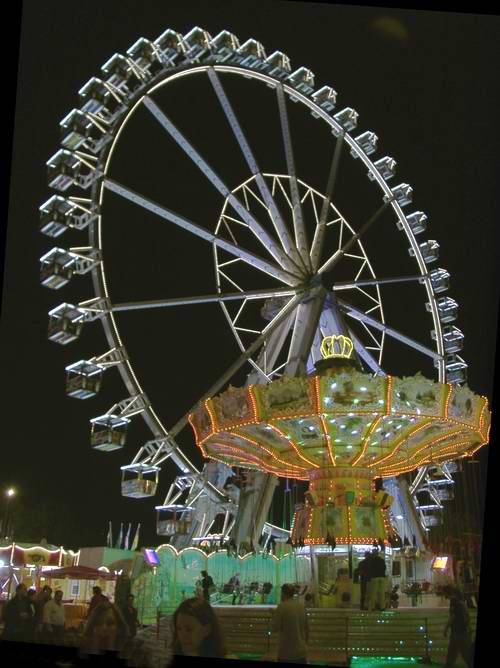
Steiger Ferris Wheel at the Cannstatter Volksfest in Stuttgart in 2004

The Steiger Ferris Wheel is a 60-metre (200 ft) tall transportable Ferris wheel. It began operating in 1980, and at that time was the world's tallest transportable wheel, a record documented in the Guinness Book of Records. The world's tallest transportable wheel today is the 78-metre (256 ft) Bussink Design R80XL.

Designed by the Steiger showmen company of Bad Oeynhausen, in conjunction with engineering company Dr. Cassens and Jäschke of Bremen, it was built by Kocks, also of Bremen, and is operated by Steiger. It has 42 passenger cars, and weighs 450 tons.

The foundation of the wheel consists of the 22 container pallets used to transport components of the wheel. In total, 32 vehicles are needed to transport the entire wheel. Two of the jackstands supporting the axle also serve as cranes to erect the A-frame. The wheel is equipped with a complex LED lighting system, allowing complex multi-coloured patterns to be displayed.

On October 11, 2010, the wheel collapsed at the Kramermarkt in Oldenburg during deconstruction. Although several people watched the deconstruction work, nobody was injured.
