= Harbin Ferris Wheel =

Ferris wheel in China

- Interactive map of the Harbin Ferris Wheel area

General information
- Type: Ferris wheel
- Location: Harbin, Heilongjiang, China
- Coordinates: 45.7776481°N 126.6634637°E
- Completed: 2003
- Cost: ¥20 million

Height
- Height: 110 metres (361 ft)

Harbin Ferris Wheel is a 110-metre (361 ft) tall giant Ferris wheel in Harbin amusement park, Harbin, Heilongjiang, China.

At the time of its construction in 2003, at a cost 20 million yuan (2.42 million US dollars), it was the tallest Ferris wheel in China and the sixth tallest in the world. It has 63 passenger gondolas, each able to carry 6 passengers. A complete rotation takes 20 minutes and offers panoramic views of the entire city.
