= Technocosmos =

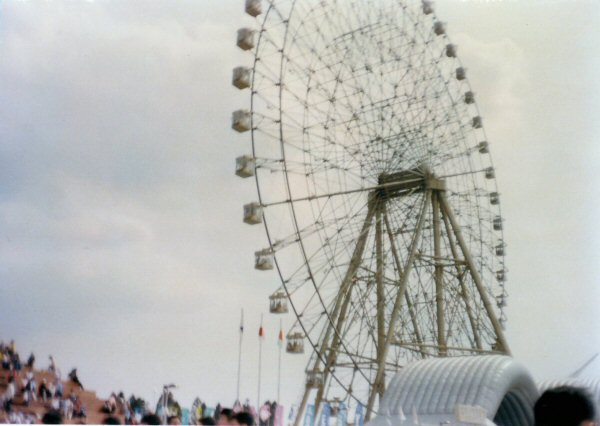
Technocosmos

Technocosmos, later renamed Technostar, was an 85-metre (279 ft) tall giant Ferris wheel that was built for the Expo '85 World Fair in Tsukuba, Ibaraki, Japan. It carried almost 3 million passengers during the exposition.

== History ==
Technocosmos had an overall height of 85 metres (279 ft), a diameter of 82.5 metres (271 ft), and took 15 minutes to complete a revolution. Each of the 48 passenger cars could carry 8 people and was equipped with solar panels to power its air conditioning.

When it began operating, Technocosmos was the World's tallest extant Ferris wheel. At that time, the tallest Ferris wheel ever built was the 100-metre (330 ft) Grande Roue de Paris (built for the 1900 Exposition Universelle in France) which was demolished in 1920. In 1989 the 107.5-metre (353 ft) Cosmo Clock 21 opened for business in Yokohama and succeeded both Technocosmos as tallest extant Ferris wheel and Grande Roue de Paris as tallest Ferris wheel ever built.

=== Renamed as Technostar in Suita ===
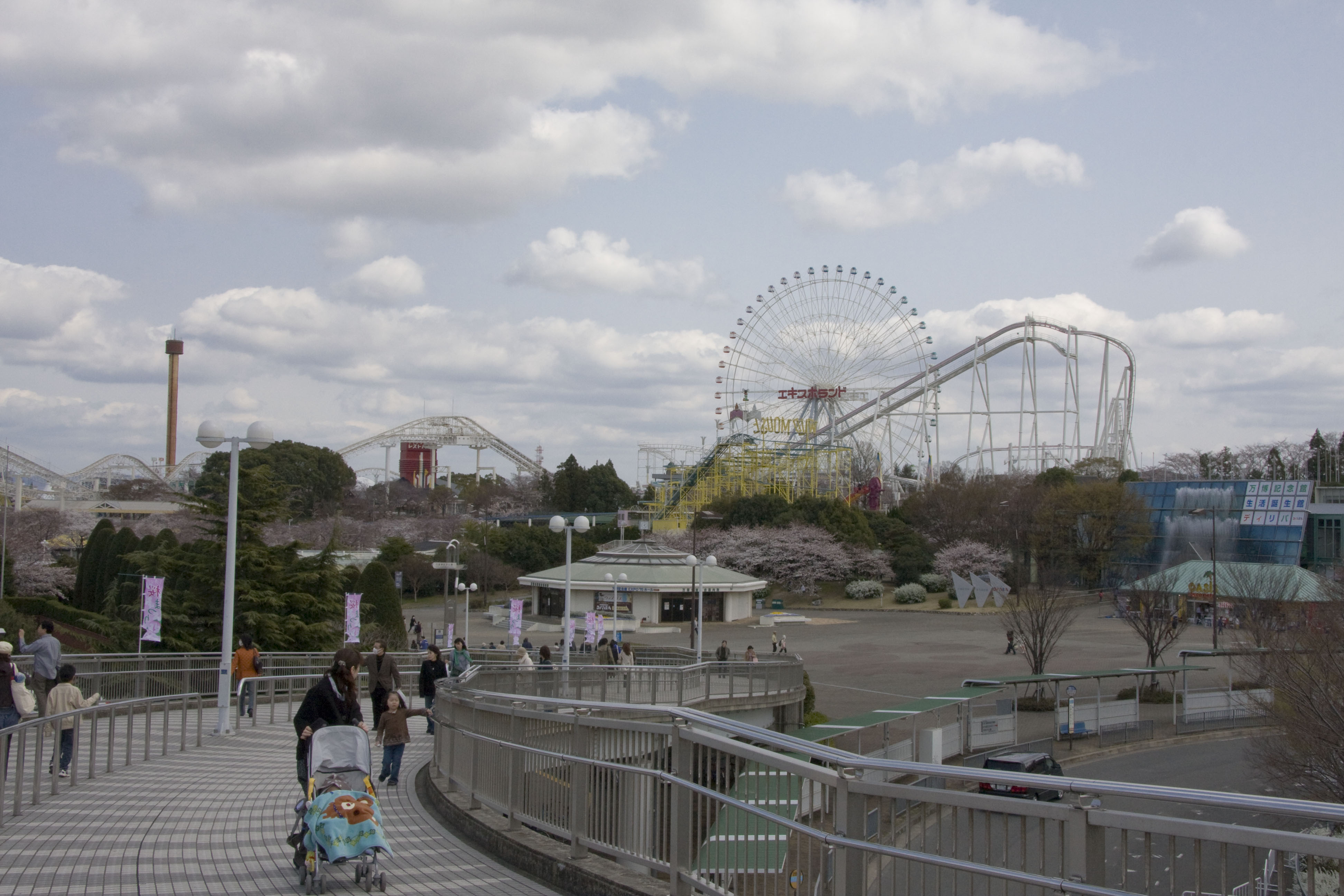
Technostar wheel from Expoland in 2008.

After Expo '85, Technocosmos was relocated in 1986 to the Expoland amusement park in Suita, Osaka Prefecture, and renamed Technostar.

Expoland has since permanently closed. Work began on dismantling Technostar in November 2009, and it had been removed from the Osaka site by the end of the following month.

In Suita city, a new wheel was opened in 2016 called the Redhorse Osaka Wheel; as part of Expocity created in 2015.

== Coordinates ==
- Technocosmos, Expo '85, Tsukuba, Ibaraki Prefecture, Kantō region: 36.061203°N 140.073055°E
- Technostar, Expoland, Suita, Osaka Prefecture, Kansai region: 34.803772°N 135.535916°E

Preceded by Wiener Riesenrad	World's tallest extant Ferris wheel 1985-1989	Succeeded by Cosmo Clock 21
