= Great Orlando Wheel =

General information
- Status: Never built
- Type: Ferris wheel
- Location: Orange County, Florida, US
- Height: 122 m (400 ft)

The Great Orlando Wheel (or Orlando Great Wheel) is one of at least five Great Wheel Corporation proposed giant Ferris wheel projects which failed between 2007 and 2010.

It was to have been constructed near Orlando in Orange County, Florida, United States, at a site adjacent to the Orlando–Orange County Convention Center, near Interstate 4, SeaWorld, and International Drive. Plans included an integrated terminal building with commercial and retail facilities, and it was to have provided a 25-mile (40 km) view of Central Florida attractions including SeaWorld, Universal Studios and Walt Disney World, as well as firework displays and rocket launches from Kennedy Space Center.

In 2010 it was reported that the project had been "put on hold" due to the poor economic climate.

Subsequently, Great Orlando Wheel Corp., created in 2007 and placed under the control of a receiver to liquidate its assets in 2013, sought to sell the 20-acre site on which they had planned to build the wheel for $12 million.
