= Ferris wheel =

Amusement ride

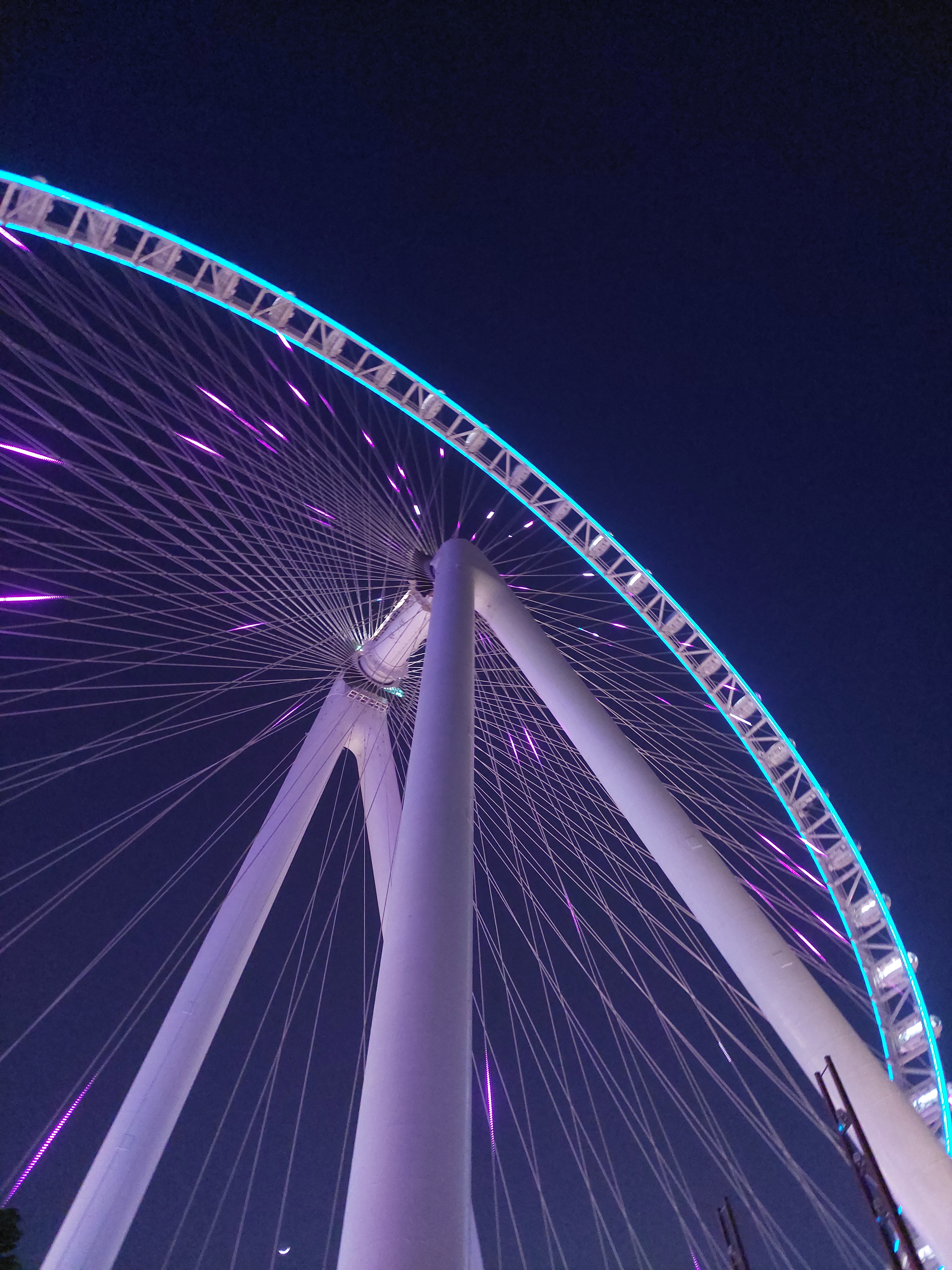
Ain Dubai, the world's largest Ferris wheel since 2021, in Dubai.

A Ferris wheel (also called a big wheel, giant wheel or an observation wheel) is an amusement ride consisting of a rotating upright wheel with multiple passenger-carrying components (commonly referred to as passenger cars, cabins, tubs, gondolas, capsules, or pods) attached to the rim in such a way that as the wheel turns, they are kept upright, usually by gravity. Some of the largest modern Ferris wheels have cars mounted on the outside of the rim, with electric motors to independently rotate each car to keep it upright.

The original Ferris Wheel was designed and constructed by George Washington Gale Ferris Jr. as a landmark for the 1893 World's Columbian Exposition in Chicago, although much smaller wooden wheels of a similar idea predate Ferris's wheel, dating perhaps to the 1500s. The generic term "Ferris wheel" is now used in American English for all such structures, which have become a very common type of amusement ride at amusement parks, state fairs, and other fairs or carnivals in the United States.

The tallest Ferris wheel is the 250-metre (820 ft) Ain Dubai in the United Arab Emirates, which opened in October 2021.

== Terminology and design ==
The term Ferris wheel comes from the designer of the best known early example, George Washington Gale Ferris Jr., whose Ferris Wheel Company built a large amusement for the Chicago World's Columbian Exposition in 1893.

The Ferris Wheel Company was formed in 1892 for the [construction and operation of] "wheels of the Ferris or other types for the purpose of observation or amusement", the source of the modern usage observation wheel for the type.

Design variations include single- (cantilevered) or twin-sided support for the wheel, and whether the cars or capsules are oriented upright by gravity or by electric motors. The most prevalent design uses twin-sided support and gravity-oriented capsules.

== Early history ==
Early 17th-century pleasure wheels; to the left an engraving by Adam Olearius, to the right a modern depiction of a period Turkish design

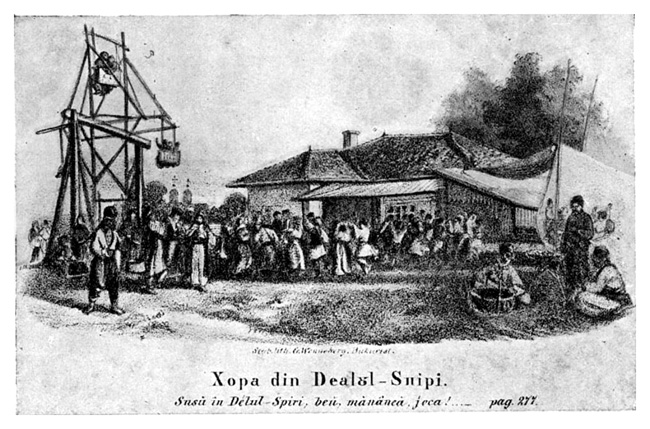
An early wheel in Bucharest, Romania (1857 lithograph)

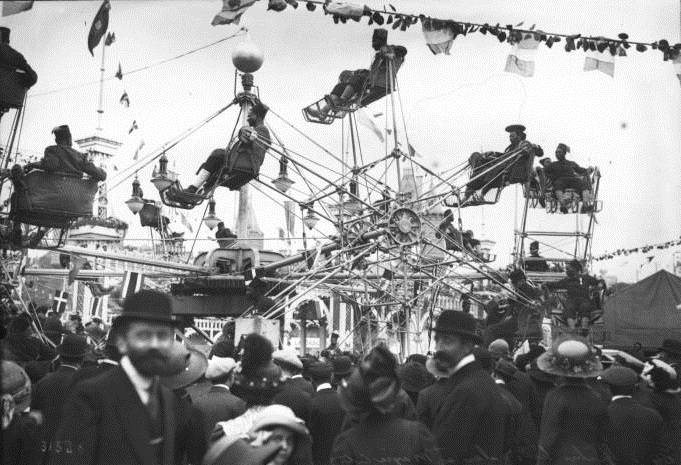
Magic-City, Paris, France, 1913

"Pleasure wheels", whose passengers rode in chairs suspended from large wooden rings turned by strong men, may have originated in 17th-century Bulgaria.

The Travels of Peter Mundy in Europe and Asia, 1608–1667 describes and illustrates "severall Sorts of Swinginge used in their Publique rejoyceings att their Feast of Biram" on 17 May 1620 at Philippopolis (now Plovdiv) in the Ottoman Balkans. Among means "lesse dangerous and troublesome" was one:

like a Craine wheele att Customhowse Key and turned in that Manner, whereon Children sitt on little seats hunge round about in severall parts thereof, And though it turne right upp and downe, and that the Children are sometymes on the upper part of the wheele, and sometymes on the lower, yett they alwaies sitt upright.

Five years earlier, in 1615, Pietro Della Valle, a Roman traveller who sent letters from Constantinople, Persia, and India, attended a Ramadan festival in Constantinople. He describes the fireworks, floats, and great swings, then comments on riding the Great Wheel:

I was delighted to find myself swept upwards and downwards at such speed. But the wheel turned round so rapidly that a Greek who was sitting near me couldn't bear it any longer, and shouted out "soni! soni!" (enough! enough!)

Similar wheels also appeared in England in the 17th century, and subsequently elsewhere around the world, including India, Romania, and Siberia.

A Frenchman, Antonio Manguino, introduced the idea to the United States in 1848, when he constructed a wooden pleasure wheel to attract visitors to his start-up fair in Walton Spring, Georgia.

=== Somers' Roundabout ===
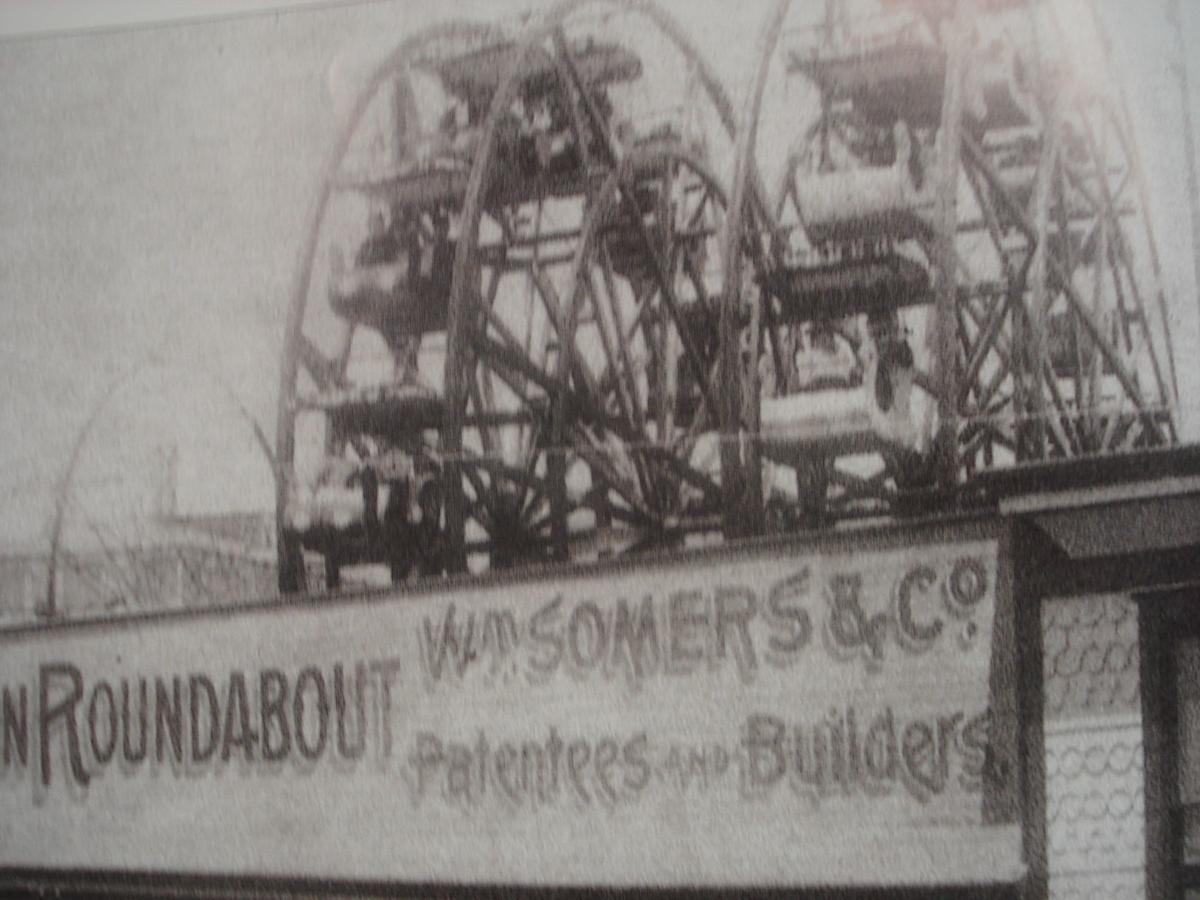
A 50 foot wooden wheel built by William Somers in Atlantic City, New Jersey, in 1891 was an immediate precursor to the original Ferris Wheel

In 1891, William Somers installed a fifty-foot wooden wheel at Atlantic City, New Jersey, and later others at Asbury Park, New Jersey, and Coney Island, New York. In 1893 he was granted the first U.S. patent for a "Roundabout". George Washington Gale Ferris Jr. rode on Somers' wheel in Atlantic City before designing his wheel for the World's Columbian Exposition. In 1893, Somers filed a lawsuit against Ferris for patent infringement; however, Ferris and his lawyers successfully argued that the Ferris Wheel and its technology differed greatly from Somers' wheel, and the case was dismissed.

=== The original Ferris Wheel ===
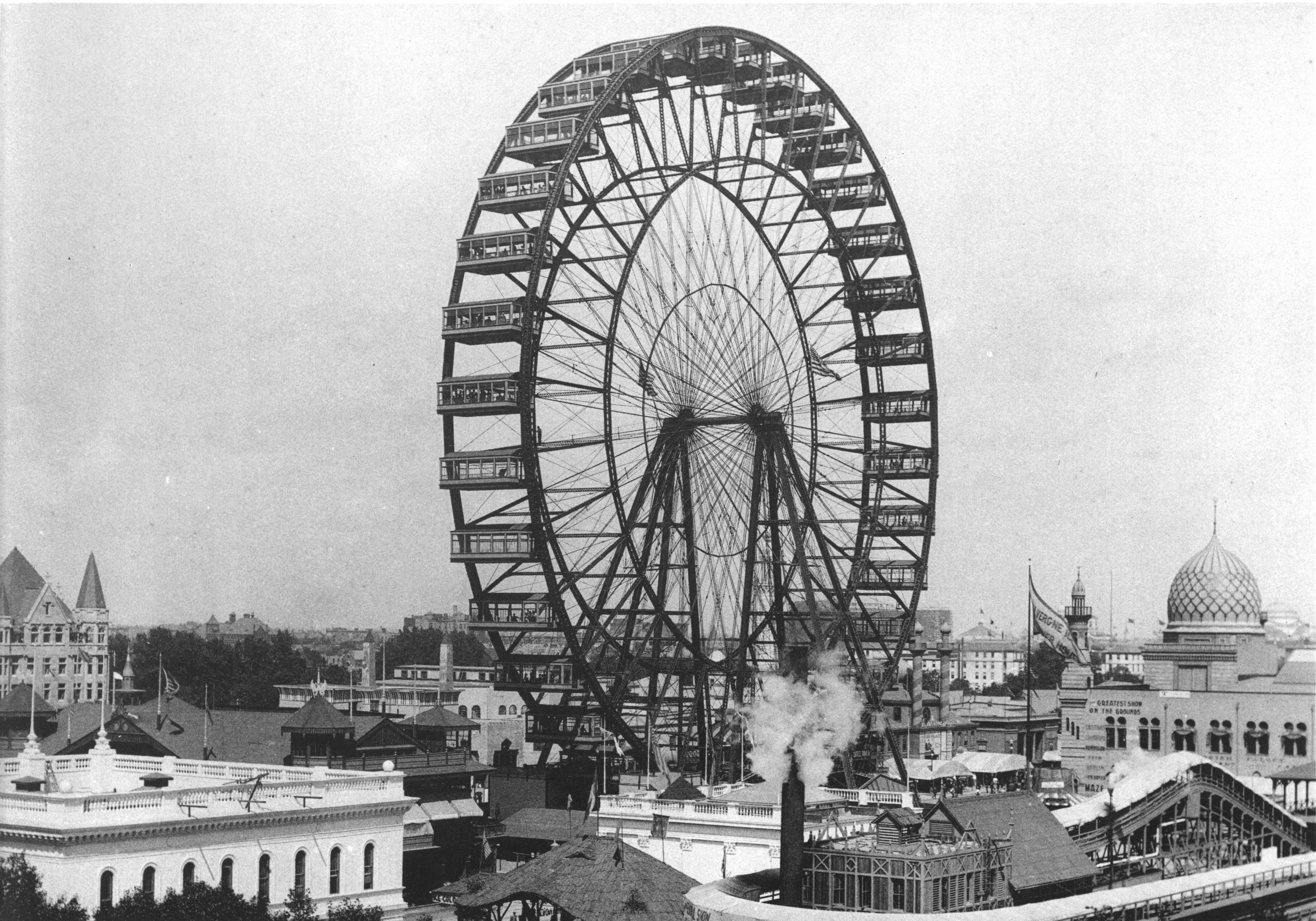
The original Chicago Ferris Wheel, built for the 1893 World's Columbian Exposition

The original Ferris wheel, sometimes referred to as the Chicago Wheel, was designed and constructed by Ferris Jr. and opened in 1893; however, an earlier wheel was created for the New York State fair in 1854, created by two Erie Canal workers.

With a height of 80.4 metres (264 ft), it was the tallest attraction at the World's Columbian Exposition in Chicago, Illinois, where it opened to the public on June 21, 1893. It was intended to rival the 324-metre (1,063 ft) Eiffel Tower, the centerpiece of the 1889 Paris Exposition.

Ferris was a graduate of Rensselaer Polytechnic Institute and a bridge-builder in Pittsburgh, Pennsylvania. He began his career in the railroad industry and then pursued an interest in bridge building. Ferris understood the growing need for structural steel and founded G.W.G. Ferris & Co. in Pittsburgh, a firm that tested and inspected metals for railroads and bridge builders.

The wheel rotated on a 71-ton, 45.5-foot (13.9 m) axle comprising what was at that time the world's largest hollow forging, manufactured in Pittsburgh by the Bethlehem Iron Company and weighing 89,320 pounds (40,510 kg), together with two 16-foot-diameter (4.9 m) cast-iron spiders weighing 53,031 pounds (24,054 kg).

There were 36 cars, each fitted with 40 revolving chairs and able to accommodate up to 60 people, giving a total capacity of 2,160. The cars were 24 feet long, 13 feet wide, and 10 feet high. The wheel carried some 38,000 passengers daily. It took 20 minutes to complete two revolutions: the first involved six stops for passenger exchange, and the second was a nine-minute non-stop rotation, for which the ticket holder paid 50 cents.

The Exposition ended in October 1893, and the wheel, which had closed in April 1894, was dismantled and stored until the following year. It was then rebuilt on Chicago's North Side, near the high-income enclave of Lincoln Park. William D. Boyce, then a resident, filed a Circuit Court action against the owners of the wheel to have it removed, but without success. It operated there from October 1895 until 1903, when it was again dismantled, then transported by rail to St. Louis for the 1904 World's Fair and finally destroyed by controlled demolition using dynamite on May 11, 1906.

=== Antique Ferris wheels ===
Wiener Riesenrad, Vienna, built in 1897, originally had 30 passenger cabins but was rebuilt with 15 cabins following a fire in 1944

The Wiener Riesenrad (German for "Viennese Giant Wheel") is a surviving example of 19th-century Ferris wheels. Erected in 1897 in the Wurstelprater section of Prater public park in the Leopoldstadt district of Vienna, Austria, to celebrate Emperor Franz Josef I's Golden Jubilee, it has a height of 64.75 metres (212 ft) and originally had 30 passenger cars. A demolition permit for the Riesenrad was issued in 1916, but due to a lack of funds with which to carry out the destruction, it survived.

Following the demolition of the 96-metre (315 ft) Grande Roue de Paris in 1920, the Riesenrad became the world's tallest extant Ferris wheel. In 1944 it burnt down, but was rebuilt the following year with 15 passenger cars, and remained the world's tallest extant wheel until the 85-metre (279 ft) Technocosmos was constructed in 1984 for Expo '85, at Tsukuba, Ibaraki, Japan.

Still in operation today, it is one of Vienna's most popular tourist attractions, and over the years has featured in numerous films (including Madame Solange d`Atalide (1914), Letter from an Unknown Woman (1948), The Third Man (1949), The Living Daylights (1987), Before Sunrise (1995) and novels.

== World's tallest Ferris wheels ==
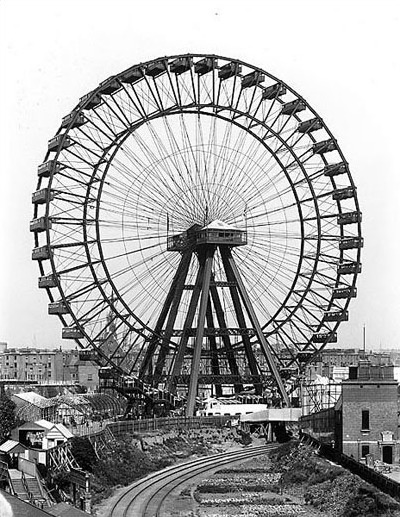
The 94 m Great Wheel at Earls Court, London, world's tallest Ferris wheel 1895–1900

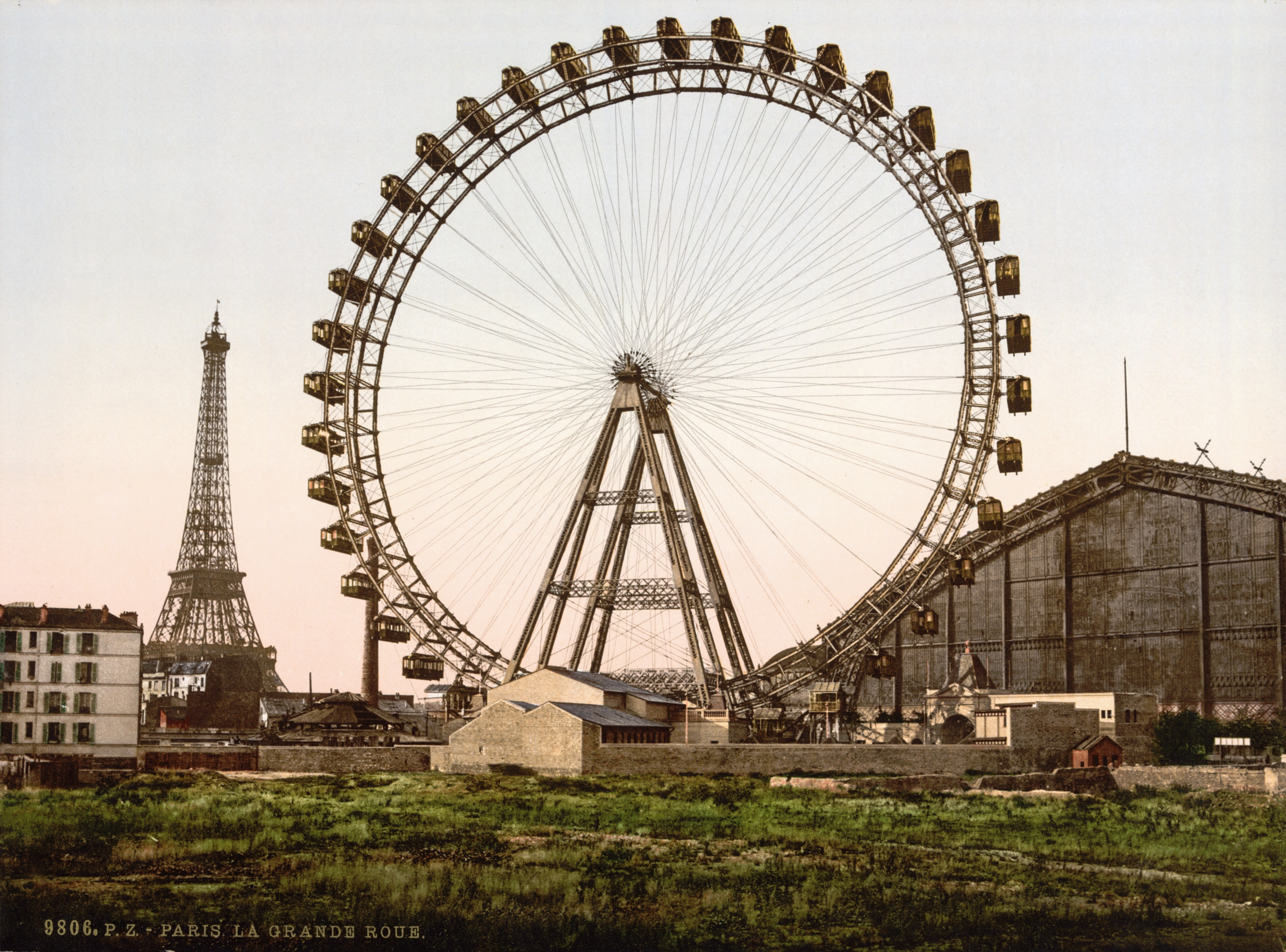
The 96 m Grande Roue de Paris, world's tallest Ferris wheel 1900–1920

Chronology of world's tallest wheels

- 1893: the original Ferris Wheel was 70.4 metres (231 ft) tall. Built for the World's Columbian Exposition in Chicago, Illinois, it was moved to St. Louis, Missouri, in 1904 for the Louisiana Purchase Exposition, and demolished there in 1906.
- 1895: the Great Wheel was built for the Empire of India Exhibition at Earls Court, London, UK, and was 310 feet (94.5 m) tall. Construction began in March 1894 and it opened to the public on July 17, 1895. It stayed in service until 1906 and was demolished in 1907, having carried over 2.5 million passengers.
- 1900: the Grande Roue de Paris was built for the Exposition Universelle, a world's fair held in Paris, France. It was demolished in 1920, but its 96-metre (315 ft) height was not surpassed until almost 90 years after its construction.
- 1920: the Wiener Riesenrad was built to celebrate the Golden Jubilee of Emperor Franz Josef I, at the entrance of the Wurstelprater amusement park in Austria's capital Vienna. Constructed in 1897, when the Grande Roue de Paris was demolished in 1920, the Riesenrad became the world's tallest extant Ferris wheel with 64.75-metre (212 ft), and it remained so for the next 65 years until 1985, its 97th year.
- 1985: Technocosmos, later renamed Technostar, was an 85-metre (279 ft) tall giant Ferris wheel, originally built for the Expo 85 World Fair in Tsukuba, Ibaraki, Japan. Work began on dismantling Technostar in November 2009.
- 1989: the Cosmo Clock 21 was built for the YES '89 Yokohama Exposition at Minato Mirai 21, Yokohama, Japan. Originally constructed with a height of 107.5 metres (353 ft), it was dismantled in 1997 and then in 1999 relocated onto a taller base which increased its overall height to 112.5 metres (369 ft).
- 1992: Igosu 108 at Biwako Tower, Ōtsu, Shiga, Japan, opened April 26 at 108 metres (354 ft) tall, hence its name. It has since been moved to Vietnam, where it opened as the Sun Wheel on a new base, now totaling 115 metres (377 ft) tall.
- 1997: the Tempozan Ferris Wheel, in Osaka, Japan, opened to the public on July 13, and is 112.5 metres (369 ft) tall.
- 1999: the Daikanransha at Palette Town in Odaiba, Tokyo, Japan, is 115 metres (377 ft) tall.
- 2000: the London Eye, in London, United Kingdom, is 135 metres (443 ft) tall. Although officially opened on December 31, 1999, it did not open to the public until March 2000 due to technical problems.
- 2006: the Star of Nanchang, in Nanchang, Jiangxi Province, China, opened for business in May and is 160 metres (525 ft) tall.
- 2008: the Singapore Flyer, in Singapore, is 165 metres (541 ft) tall. It started rotating on February 11, and officially opened to the public on March 1, 2008.
- 2014: the High Roller, in Las Vegas, Nevada, United States, is 167.6 metres (550 ft) tall. It opened to the public on March 31, 2014.
- 2021: the Ain Dubai in the United Arab Emirates is 250-metre (820 ft). It opened to the public on October 21, 2021.

Timeline

Name	Height m (ft)	Completed	Country	Location	Coordinates	Remarks
Ain Dubai	250 (820)	2021	United Arab Emirates	Bluewaters Island, Dubai	25.080111°N 55.124056°E	World's tallest 2021–present
High Roller	167.6 (550)	2014	United States	Las Vegas, Nevada	36.117402°N 115.168127°W	World's tallest 2014–2021
Singapore Flyer	165 (541)	2008	Singapore	Marina Centre, Downtown Core	1.289397°N 103.863231°E	World's tallest 2008–2014
Star of Nanchang	160 (525)	2006	China	Nanchang, Jiangxi	28.659332°N 115.845568°E	World's tallest 2006–2008
Sun of Moscow	140 (459)	2022	Russia	VDNKh, Moscow	55.8267°N 37.6270°E	Europe's tallest since 2022
London Eye	135 (443)	2000	United Kingdom	South Bank, Lambeth, London	51.50334°N 0.1197821°W	World's tallest 2000–2006
Squirrel Windmill	133 (436)	2020	China	Wuhu, Anhui	31.278467°N 118.341222°E	
Bay Glory	128 (420)	2021	China	Qianhai Bay, Shenzhen	22.541373°N 113.887673°E	
Sky Dream	126 (413)	2017	Taiwan	Lihpao Land, Taichung	24.325145°N 120.700690°E	"Sky Dream Fukuoka" wheel in a new location
Redhorse Osaka Wheel	123 (404)	2016	Japan	Expocity, Suita, Osaka	34.805278°N 135.535°E	
The Wheel at ICON Park Orlando	122 (400)	2015	United States	Orlando, Florida	28.443198°N 81.468296°W	
Vinpearl Sky Wheel	120 (394)	2017	Vietnam	Nha Trang	12.2220492°N 109.2425425°E	Picture Vietnam's tallest since 2017
Suzhou Ferris Wheel	120 (394)	2009	China	Suzhou, Jiangsu	31.3162939°N 120.7084501°E	
Melbourne Star	120 (394)	2008	Australia	Docklands, Melbourne	37.8110723°S 144.9368763°E	Closed in September 2021
Tianjin Eye	120 (394)	2008	China	Yongle Bridge, Hongqiao, Tianjin	39.1533636°N 117.1802616°E	
Changsha Ferris Wheel	120 (394)	2004	China	Changsha, Hunan	28.1821772°N 112.9800886°E	
Zhengzhou Ferris Wheel	120 (394)	2003	China	Century Amusement Park, Henan	34.732871°N 113.718739°E	
Sky Dream Fukuoka	120 (394)	2002	Japan	Evergreen Marinoa, Fukuoka, Fukuoka	33.5956845°N 130.3225279°E	Closed in September 2009
Diamond and Flower Ferris Wheel	117 (384)	2001	Japan	Kasai Rinkai Park, Edogawa, Tokyo	35.6439052°N 139.8572257°E	
Sun Wheel	115 (377)	2014	Vietnam	Da Nang	16.040070°N 108.226492°E	"Igosu 108" wheel in a new location
Star of Lake Tai	115 (377)	2008	China	Lake Tai, Wuxi, Jiangsu	31.5208296°N 120.260945°E	Picture
Daikanransha	115 (377)	1999	Japan	Palette Town, Odaiba, Tokyo	35.6263915°N 139.7822902°E	World's tallest 1999–2000; closed in August 2022
Cosmo Clock 21 (2nd installation)	112.5 (369)	1999	Japan	Minato Mirai 21, Yokohama, Kanagawa	35.4553872°N 139.6367347°E	
Tempozan Ferris Wheel	112.5 (369)	1997	Japan	Osaka, Osaka	34.6561657°N 135.431031°E	World's tallest 1997–1999
Harbin Ferris Wheel	110 (361)	2003	China	Harbin, Heilongjiang	45.7776481°N 126.6634637°E	
Shanghai Ferris Wheel	108 (354)	2002	China	Jinjiang Action Park, Shanghai	31.1401286°N 121.4030752°E	
Igosu 108	108 (354)	1992	Japan	Biwako Tower, Ōtsu, Shiga	35.1267338°N 135.9263551°E	World's tallest 1992–1997; closed in 2001; moved to Vietnam in 2014
Cosmo Clock 21 (1st installation)	107.5 (353)	1989	Japan	Minato Mirai 21, Yokohama, Kanagawa	Unknown	World's tallest 1989–1992; dismantled in 1997
Space Eye	100 (328)	2000	Japan	Space World, Kitakyushu, Fukuoka	33.8716939°N 130.8099014°E	Picture Closed in 2017; moved to Cambodia
Grande Roue de Paris	96 (315)	1900	France	Avenue de Suffren, Paris	48.851809°N 2.299223°E	World's tallest 1900–1920
Great Wheel	94 (308)	1895	United Kingdom	Earls Court, London	51.48835°N 0.19889°W	World's tallest 1895–1900
Eurowheel	92 (302)	1999	Italy	Mirabilandia, Ravenna	44.3392161°N 12.2622228°E	
Roda Rico	91 (299)	2022	Brazil	São Paulo, São Paulo		
Aurora Wheel	90 (295)	Unknown	Japan	Nagashima Spa Land, Kuwana, Mie	35.0298207°N 136.7336351°E	Picture
Rio Star	88 (289)	2019	Brazil	Rio de Janeiro, Rio de Janeiro	22.893247°S 43.194334°W	
Sky Wheel	88 (289)	Unknown	Taiwan	Janfusun Fancyworld, Gukeng	23.6202611°N 120.5763352°E	
Technostar; Technocosmos	85 (279)	1985	Japan	Expoland, Suita, Osaka (?-2009); Expo 85, Tsukuba, Ibaraki (1985–?)	34.803772°N 135.535916°E; 36.061203°N 140.073055°E	Technocosmos renamed/relocated World's tallest extant 1985–1989
The original Ferris Wheel	80.4 (264)	1893	United States	Chicago, Midway Plaisance (1893–1894); Chicago, Lincoln Park (1895–1903); St. Louis (1904–06)	41.786817°N 87.5989187°W; 41.930403°N 87.643492°W; 38.642718°N 90.301051°W	World's tallest 1893–1894

=== Future wheels ===
Following the success of the 135-metre (443 ft) London Eye, which opened in 2000, giant Ferris wheels have been proposed for many other cities; however, many of these projects have stalled or failed.

==== Construction in progress ====
- Isfahan Eye, a 222 m (728 ft) Ferris wheel in Mount Soffeh, Iran, under development by the city's municipality. It will be built with a financing of 1000 billion toman.
- The 139 m (456 ft) Nanjing OCT Funland Ferris Wheel has passed national inspections in early 2023 and is about to open to the public.
- Dhaka Eye, a 90 m (300 ft) Ferris wheel, as a part of Bashundhara Central Park, an amusement park under construction in Dhaka, Bangladesh.
- The Rueda de Buenos Aires will be a 81.5 m (267 ft) Ferris wheel located at Dike 1 of Puerto Madero in Buenos Aires, Argentina. It will have 36 cabins with capacity for 8 people and the tour will last approximately 30 minutes.

==== Abandoned projects ====
- The Skyvue Las Vegas Super Wheel (or SkyVue—the official website uses both) was announced as being 145 m (476 ft) tall, and later reported as 150 m (492 ft) and 152.4 m (500 ft). It was approved by Clark County Commission in March 2011, and announced at a groundbreaking ceremony in May 2011 that "We expect it to be up and running in time for New Year's 2012". The completion date for its construction on the Las Vegas Strip was subsequently put back several times. As of 2014, construction had stalled. The project was eventually canceled due to a lack of funding, and the property was put up for sale in 2020 and again in 2022.
- The 190.5 m (625 ft) New York Wheel was first reported in June 2012 and officially announced by mayor Michael Bloomberg in September 2012. Construction at Staten Island, New York City, alongside the planned Empire Outlets retail complex, was originally planned to begin early in 2014, and completion was originally expected to be in 2015. In October 2014, it was reported that construction would not begin until 2015, with completion delayed until 2017. This was subsequently further pushed back to April 2018, and then delayed indefinitely after developer NY Wheel fired lead contractor Mammoet-Starneth LLC in July 2017 amid a legal dispute over missed design and construction deadlines. In May 2018, the developers of the New York Wheel were given a last chance to obtain funding for the project. Per a ruling in the Delaware bankruptcy court, the developers had 120 days, until September 5, to secure funding; however, on September 7, 2018, it was announced that the New York Wheel would not receive $140 million in city funding. The delays caused concern among EB-5 visa investors, who would lose their visas if the project was not constructed. An amendment to the bankruptcy court's ruling gave the developers a final 120-day extension to look for funding. If the developers did not get funding by January 2019, the project would be canceled, and no further funding extensions would be given. On September 21, 2018, mayor Bill de Blasio said that the now-$900-million project would not receive a bailout from the city because it was too risky to support the project with bonds. As such, the city would not support tax-free status for a $380 million bond sale to complete the project. Investors refused to proceed with construction without city support, and stated that it would allow the parts for the Ferris wheel to be auctioned off if the city did not provide funding. Subsequently, investors decided to cancel the project. At this point, investors had spent $450 million on the project.

==== Quiescent proposals ====
Incomplete, delayed, stalled, cancelled, failed, or abandoned proposals:

- The 220 m (722 ft) Moscow View, proposed in 2011, was to have featured 48 monorail-mounted passenger capsules, each able to carry 48 passengers, travelling around a centreless non-rotating rim. At that time the timeframe for its construction was unknown and its site within Moscow had yet to be selected, though candidates were said to include the All-Russia Exhibition Centre, Gorky Park, Prospekt Vernadskogo, and Sparrow Hills. In December 2011 the project was reported to be stalled due to lack of City Hall approval.
- The 208 m (682 ft) Beijing Great Wheel was originally due to begin construction in 2007 and to open in 2008, but went into receivership in 2010. It was one of at least five Great Wheel Corporation giant Ferris wheel projects which failed between 2007 and 2010.
- The 198 m (650 ft) Baghdad Eye was proposed for Baghdad, Iraq, in August 2008. At that time, three possible locations had been identified, but no estimates of cost or completion date were given. In October 2008, it was reported that Al-Zawraa Park was expected to be the site, and a 55 m (180 ft) wheel was installed there in March 2011.
- The 185 m (607 ft) Great Dubai Wheel proposed for Dubailand, Dubai, United Arab Emirates, was granted planning permission in 2006 and expected to open in 2009, but it was subsequently confirmed that it would not be built. It was one of at least five Great Wheel Corporation giant Ferris wheel projects which failed between 2007 and 2010.
- The 183 m (600 ft) Voyager was proposed several times for Las Vegas, Nevada.
- The 176 m (577 ft) Bangkok Eye, to be located near the Chao Phraya River in Bangkok, Thailand, was announced by the Bangkok Metropolitan Administration on October 13, 2010. At that time, the actual site and funding mechanism for the 30-billion baht project had yet to be determined.

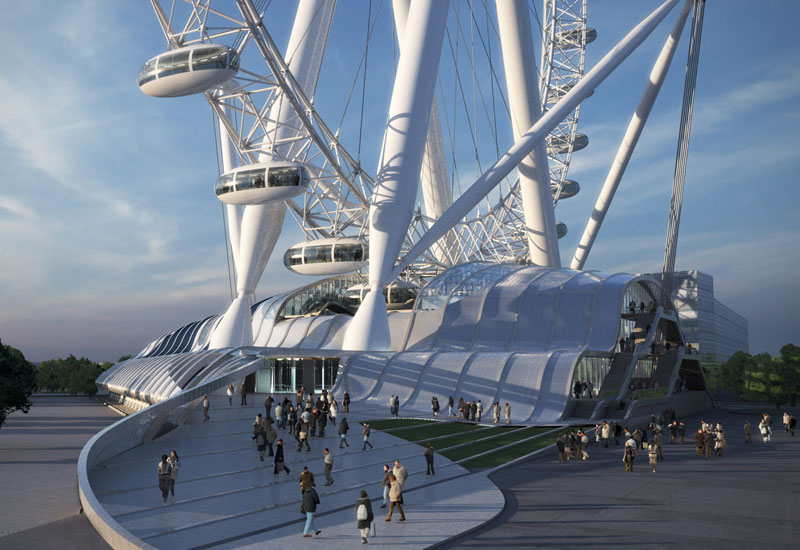
Artist's impression of the 175 m Great Berlin Wheel, a project originally due for completion in 2008, but which stalled after encountering financial obstacles

- The 175 m (574 ft) Great Berlin Wheel was originally planned to open in 2008, but the project encountered financial obstacles. It was one of at least five Great Wheel Corporation giant Ferris wheel projects which failed between 2007 and 2010.
- The 150 m (492 ft) Jeddah Eye was proposed in 2008, as part of a development scheduled to open in 2012 in Saudi Arabia. Construction was to have begun in 2009, but there were no subsequent announcements. It was one of at least five Great Wheel Corporation giant Ferris wheel projects which failed between 2007 and 2010.
- A 137.2 m (450 ft) Ferris wheel project involving Tussauds was considered for New York City's South Street Seaport in 2004, but was never built.
- The 122 m (400 ft) Great Orlando Wheel was announced in June 2008 but then suspended in early 2009 after losing its funding. It was one of at least five Great Wheel Corporation giant Ferris wheel projects which failed between 2007 and 2010.
- The 120 m (394 ft) Kolkata Eye was first proposed in 2011 for construction on the banks of Hooghly River in Kolkata, West Bengal, India. Favoured by Mamata Banerjee, Chief Minister of West Bengal, the project was originally valued at 100 crore rupees. This had risen to 300 crore rupees by May 2014 when Banerjee tweeted "[it] is expected to be ready in a year's time". In January 2015 The Times of India reported that the project was "still a pipe dream".
- A 120 m (394 ft) wheel for Manchester, England, was proposed by Manchester City Council in 2010 as a replacement for the transportable 60 m (197 ft) Wheel of Manchester installation, with Piccadilly Gardens the possible site and completion expected by Christmas 2011.
- The 101-metre (331 ft) Eye on Malaysia, a Chinese-manufactured wheel with 54 passenger gondolas, was scheduled to begin operating in April 2013 at Malacca Island, Malaysia. In November 2012, Chief Minister of the state of Malacca, Datuk Seri Mohd Ali Rustam, stated that the installation of piles had brought the RM40 million wheel to 15 per cent of completion, and that "the installation of the wheel structure will begin in February [2013]." Mohd Ali Rustam had previously announced the Malaysia Eye, which conflicting reports stated would be 85 metres (279 ft) or 88 metres (289 ft) tall, also to be sourced from China and located at Malacca Island, and to have 54 air-conditioned gondolas, each able to carry six people. It was scheduled to open on December 1, 2011, but was never built.
- A 91.4 m (300 ft) wheel planned for Manchester, England, for 2008, was never constructed.
- The 87 m (285 ft) Pepsi Globe was proposed for the planned Meadowlands complex in New Jersey in February 2008 and originally due to open in 2009, then put on hold until 2010. It has since been further delayed, and construction of the host complex, originally due to be completed in 2007, has been stalled since 2009 due to financing problems.

Nippon Moon, described as a "giant observation wheel" by its designers, was reported in September 2013 to be "currently in development". At that time, its height was "currently undisclosed", but "almost twice the scale of the wheel in London". Its location, an unspecified Japanese city, was "currently under wraps", and its funding had "yet to be entirely secured". Commissioned by Ferris Wheel Investment Co., Ltd., and designed by UNStudio in collaboration with Arup, Mitsubishi Heavy Industries, and Experientia, it was expected to have 32 individually themed capsules and take 40 minutes to rotate once.

The Shanghai Star, initially planned as a 200-metre (656 ft) tall wheel to be built by 2005, was revised to 170 metres (558 ft), with a completion date set in 2007, but then cancelled in 2006 due to "political incorrectness". An earlier proposal for a 250-metre (820 ft) structure, the Shanghai Kiss, with capsules ascending and descending a pair of towers which met at their peaks instead of a wheel, was deemed too expensive at £100m.

Rus-3000, a 170-metre (558 ft) wheel planned to open in 2004 in Moscow, has since been reported cancelled. Subsequently, an approximately 180-metre (591 ft) wheel was considered for Gorky Central Park of Culture and Leisure, and a 150-metre (492 ft) wheel proposed for location near Sparrow Hills. Another giant wheel planned for Prospekt Vernadskogo for 2002 was also never built.

== Variants ==
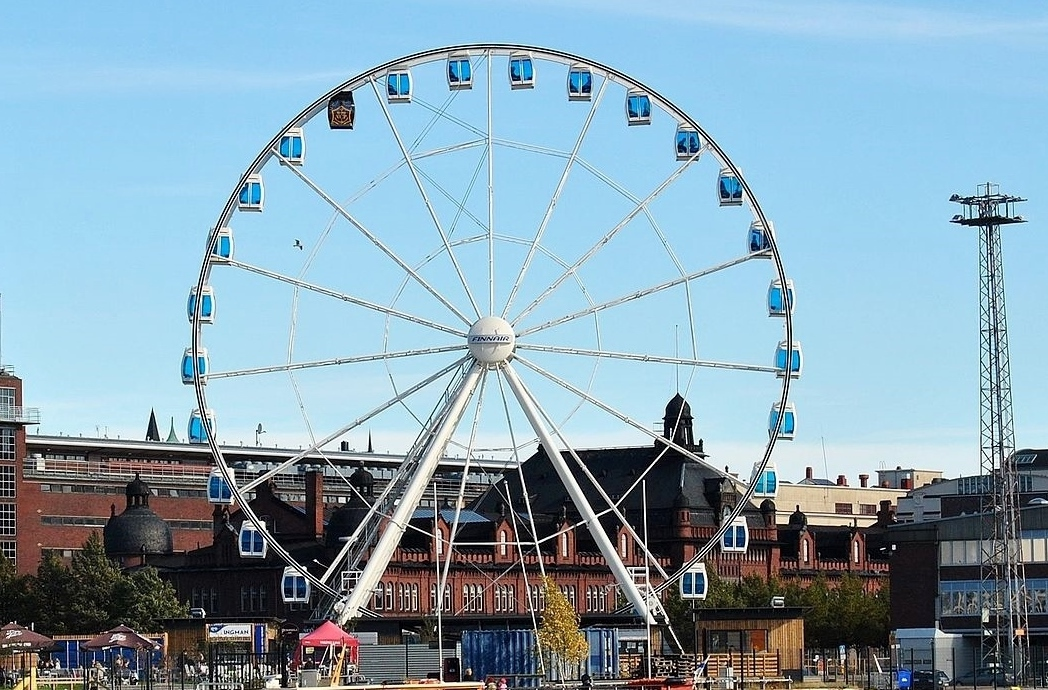
SkyWheel Helsinki, formerly known as Finnair SkyWheel, is the only Ferris wheel in the world with a sauna in one of its gondola cabins.

=== Indoor Ferris wheels ===
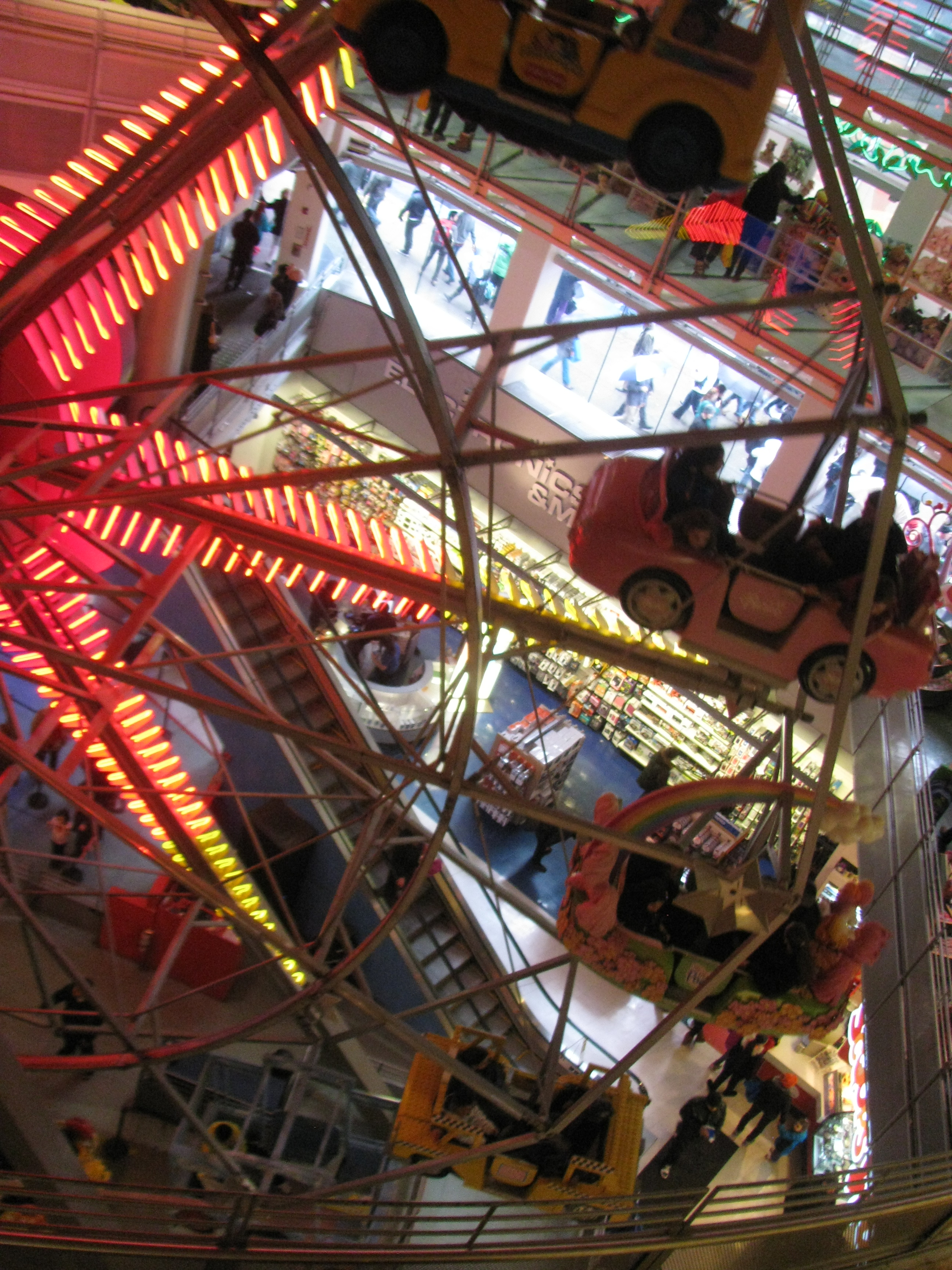
Indoor Ferris wheel in Toys-R-Us, New York City

At some malls and amusement parks, indoor Ferris wheels were realized. The largest of its kind has a diameter of 47.6 metres (156 ft) and is situated in the 95 metres (312 ft) high Alem Cultural and Entertainment Center in Ashgabat.

=== Motorised capsules ===
The Singapore Flyer has 28 cylindrical air-conditioned passenger capsules, each able to carry 28 people

The London Eye's 32 ovoidal air-conditioned passenger capsules each weigh 10 tonnes (11 short tons) and can carry 25 people

Wheels with passenger cars mounted externally to the rim and independently rotated by electric motors, as opposed to wheels with cars suspended from the rim and kept upright by gravity, are uncommon. Typically, they are called 'Observation wheels,' but there is no standardised terminology.

Only a few Ferris wheels with motorised capsules have been built.

- The 128 m (420 ft) Bay Glory is China's first giant observation wheel with motorised capsules.
- The 250 m (820 ft) Ain Dubai, world's current tallest observation wheel.
- The 167.6 m (550 ft) High Roller, world's tallest from 2014 to 2021, has externally mounted motorised capsules of a transparent spherical design, and is described as both a Ferris wheel and an observation wheel by the media.
- The 165 m (541 ft) Singapore Flyer has cylindrical externally mounted motorised capsules and is described as an observation wheel by its operators, but was also credited as "world's largest Ferris wheel" by the media when it opened in 2008.
- The 135 m (443 ft) London Eye, typically described as a "giant Ferris wheel" by the media, has ovoidal externally mounted motorised capsules and is the "world's tallest cantilevered observation wheel" according to its operator.

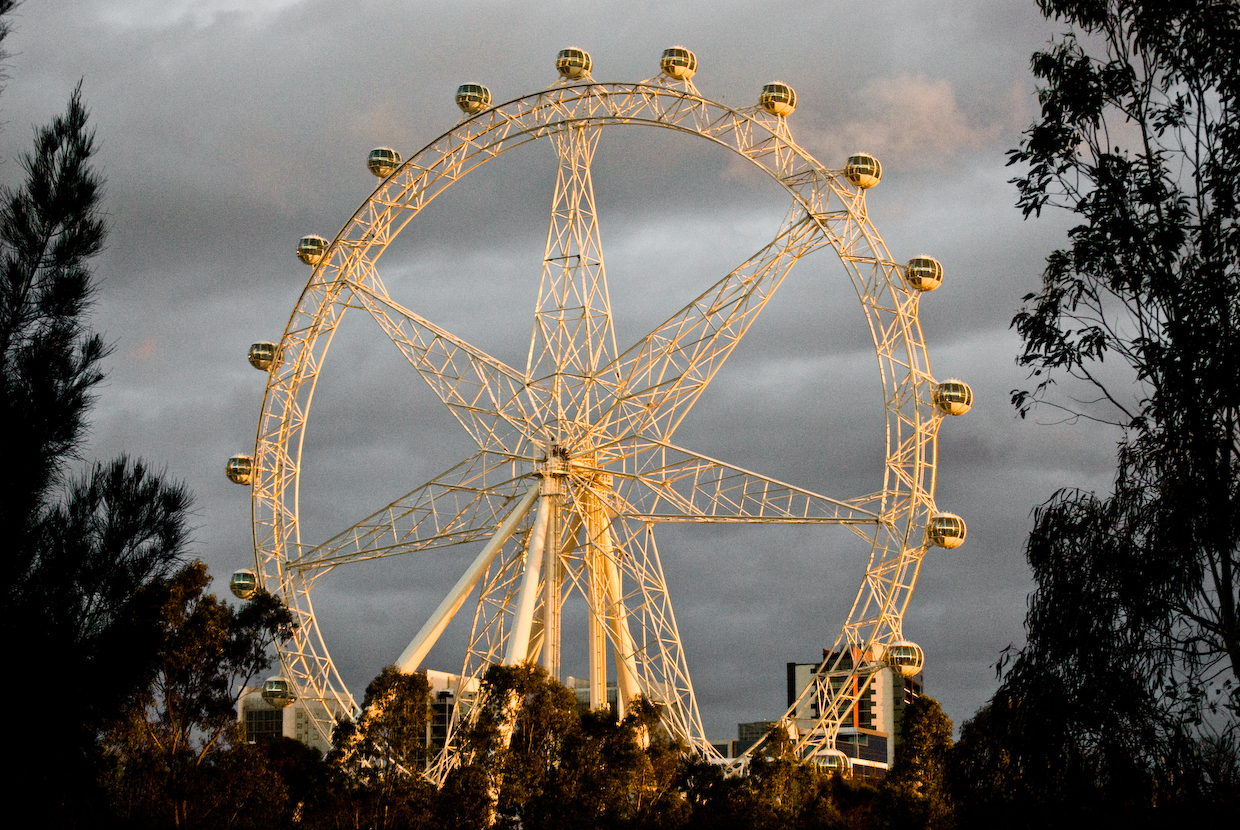
Southern Star (now Melbourne Star), tallest in the Southern Hemisphere, in 2008

- The 120 m (394 ft) Melbourne Star (previously the Southern Star) in Australia has ovoidal externally mounted motorised capsules. Its operators describe it as "the only observation wheel in the southern hemisphere", but also as a Ferris wheel by the media.
- The 139 m (456 ft) Nanjing OCT Funland Ferris Wheel is China's second giant observation wheel with motorised capsules, which has passed national inspections in early 2023 and is about to open to the public.

Official conceptual renderings of the proposed 190.5 m (625 ft) New York Wheel also show a wheel equipped with externally mounted motorised capsules.

=== Centreless wheels ===
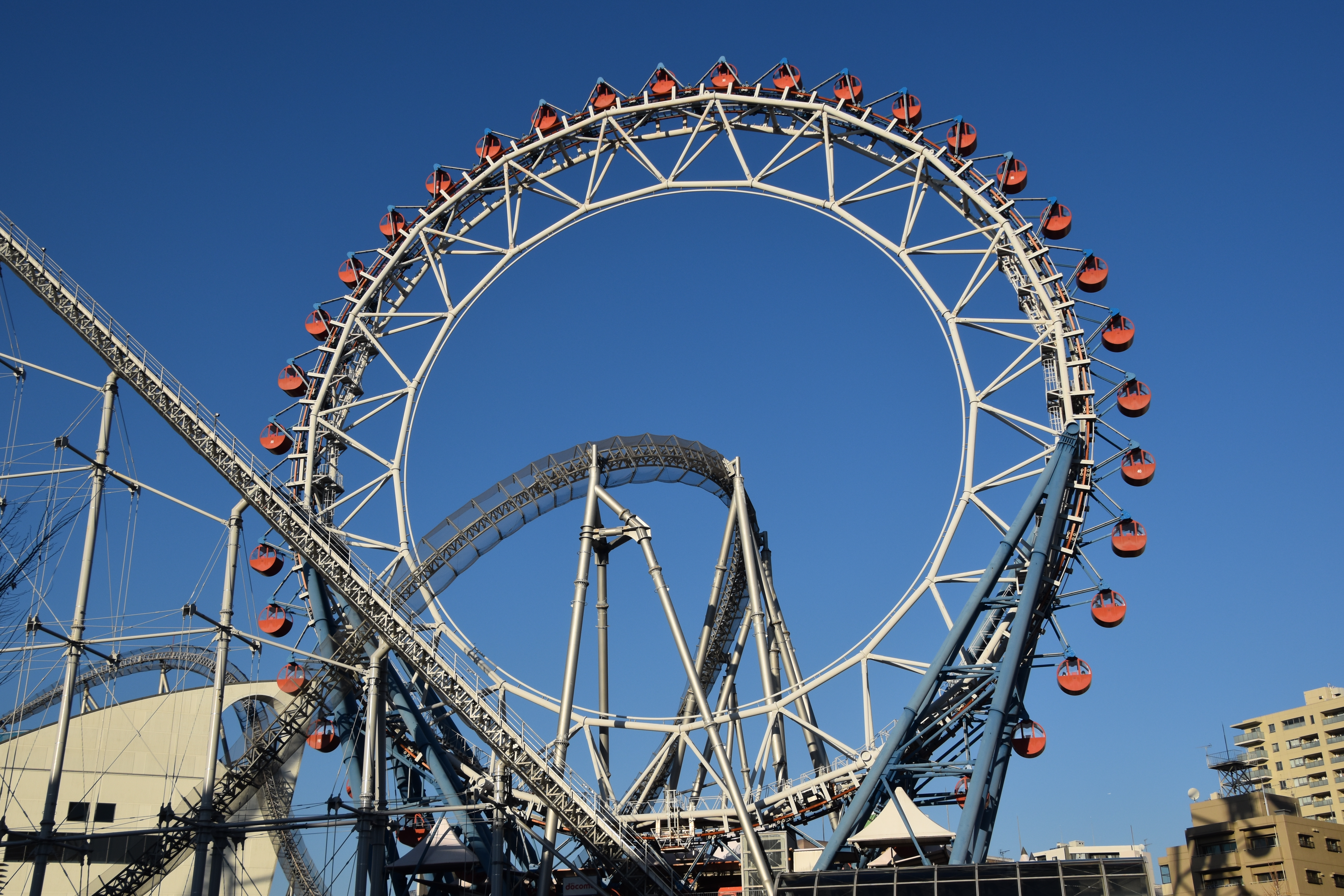
Big O, a 60-metre (197 ft) tall centreless wheel at Tokyo Dome City in Japan

In the centreless (sometimes called hubless or spokeless) wheel design, there is no central hub, and the rim of the wheel stays fixed in place. Instead, each car travels around the rim. The first centreless wheel built was the Big O at Tokyo Dome City in Japan. Its 60-metre (197 ft) height has since been surpassed by the 145-metre (475.7 ft) high Bailang River Bridge Ferris Wheel on the upper deck of the Bailang River Bridge in Shandong Province, China, which opened in 2017.

The first centreless wheel in North America opened in January 2019 at the indoor Méga Parc in Quebec City, Canada. The 23.5 m (77 ft) wheel at Méga Parc was designed and manufactured by Larson International.

=== Transportable wheels ===
Transportable Ferris wheels are designed to be operated at multiple locations, whereas fixed wheels are usually intended for permanent installation. Small transportable designs may be permanently mounted on trailers, and can be moved intact. Larger transportable wheels are designed to be repeatedly dismantled and rebuilt, some using water ballast instead of the permanent foundations of their fixed counterparts. Larger transportable wheels were designed with a self-erecting mechanism in the absence of mobile cranes reaching high enough since 1958 in Europe. Spokes must be stiff enough to carry their own weight and assemble the wheel without auxiliary scaffolding.

Fixed wheels are also sometimes dismantled and relocated. Larger examples include the original Ferris Wheel, which operated at two sites in Chicago, Illinois, and a third in St. Louis, Missouri; Technocosmos/Technostar, which moved to Expoland, Osaka, after Expo '85, Tsukuba, Ibaraki, for which it was built, ended; and Cosmo Clock 21, which added 5 metres (16 ft) onto its original 107.5-metre (353 ft) height when erected for the second time at Minato Mirai 21, Yokohama, in 1999.

The world's tallest transportable wheel today is the 78-metre (256 ft) Bussink Design R80XL.

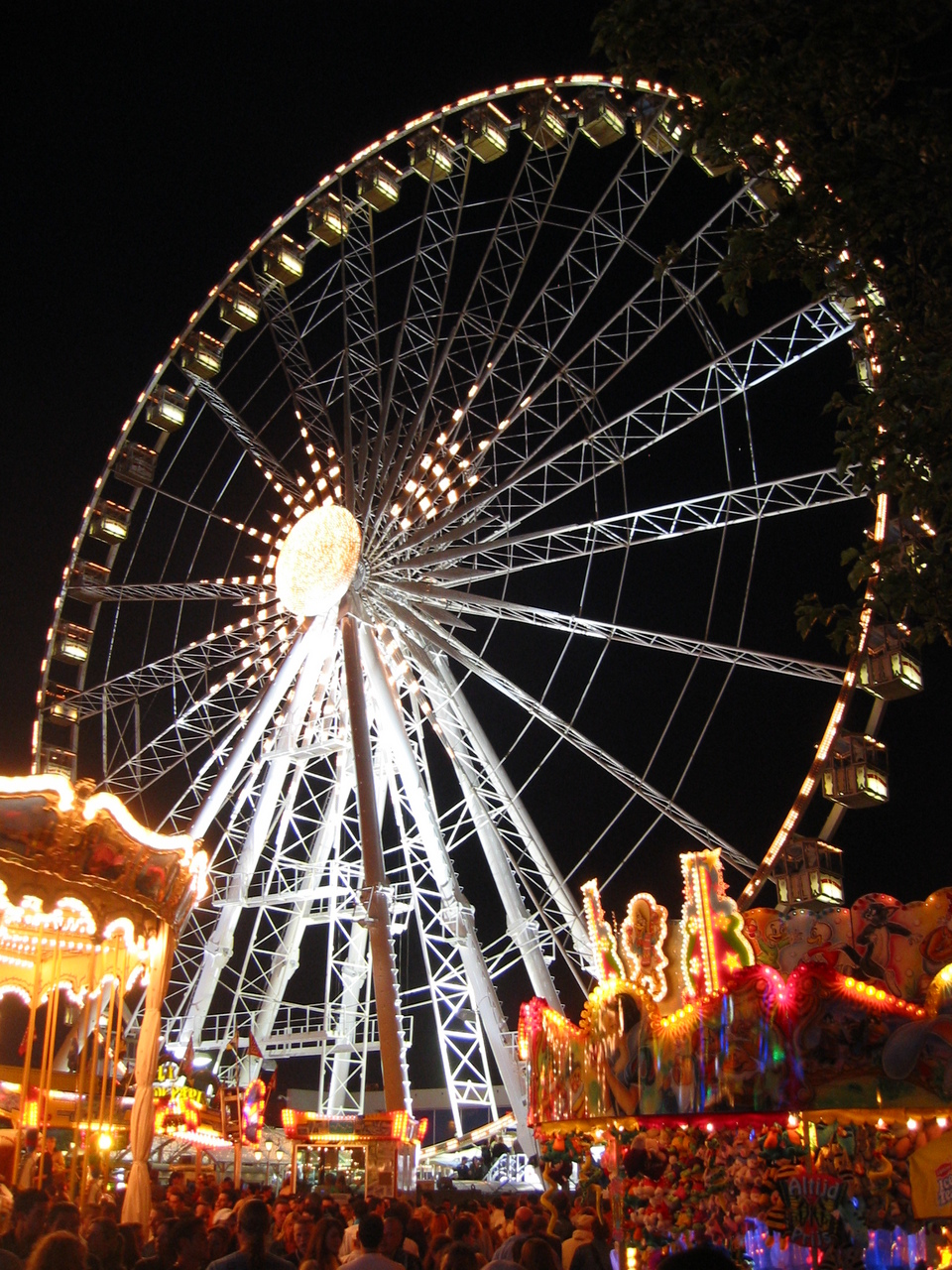
Roue de Paris, a Ronald Bussink R60 transportable wheel, at Geleen in the Netherlands in 2005

One of the most famous transportable wheels is the 60-metre (197 ft) Roue de Paris, originally installed on the Place de la Concorde in Paris for the 2000 millennium celebrations. Roue de Paris left France in 2002 and in 2003–04 operated in Birmingham and Manchester, England. In 2005 it visited first Geleen then Amsterdam, Netherlands, before returning to England to operate at Gateshead. In 2006 it was erected at the Suan Lum Night Bazaar in Bangkok, Thailand, and by 2008 had made its way to Antwerp, Belgium.

Roue de Paris is a Ronald Bussink series R60 design using 40,000 litres (8,800 imperial gallons; 11,000 US gallons) of water ballast to provide a stable base. The R60 weighs 365 tonnes (402 short tons), and can be erected in 72 hours and dismantled in 60 hours by a specialist team. Transport requires seven 20-foot container lorries, ten open trailer lorries, and one closed trailer lorry. Its 42-passenger cars can be loaded either 3 or 6 at a time; each car can carry 8 people. Bussink R60 wheels have operated in Australia (Brisbane), Canada (Niagara Falls), France (Paris), Malaysia (Kuala Lumpur & Malacca), México (Puebla), UK (Belfast, Birmingham, Manchester, Sheffield), US (Atlanta, Myrtle Beach), and elsewhere.

Other notable transportable wheels include the 60-metre (197 ft) Steiger Ferris Wheel, which was the world's tallest transportable wheel when it began operating in 1980. It has 42 passenger cars, and weighs 450 tons. On October 11, 2010, it collapsed at the Kramermarkt in Oldenburg, Germany, during deconstruction.

Notable transportable Ferris wheel installations
Name	Years	Country	Location	Coordinates
Belfast Wheel	2007–2010	UK	Belfast	54°35′48.77″N 5°55′45.06″W
Brighton Wheel	2011–2016	UK	Brighton	50.8191°N 0.1344°W
Delhi Eye	see article	India	Delhi	28.5460153°N 77.3086802°E
Eye on Malaysia	2007–2008; 2008–2010	Malaysia; Malaysia	Kuala Lumpur; Malacca	3°10′39.2″N 101°42′15.68″E; 2°11′23.4312″N 102°14′29.00″E
Estrella de Puebla	2013–2020	Mexico	Puebla	
Royal Windsor Wheel	various	UK	Windsor, Berkshire	51.4845°N 0.6119°W
Wheel of Birmingham	various	UK	Centenary Square, Birmingham	52°28′44.04″N 1°54′32.49″W
Wheel of Brisbane	2008–	Australia	South Bank Parklands, Brisbane	27.4751833°S 153.0209333°E
Wheel of Dublin	2010–2011	Ireland	North Wall, Dublin	53.3472°N 6.2276°W
Wheel of Liverpool	2010–	UK	Liverpool	53.39824°N 2.99083°W
Wheel of Manchester	various	UK	Manchester	multiple locations – see article
Wheel of Sheffield	2009–2010	UK	Fargate, Sheffield	53.3810°N 1.4699°W
Yorkshire Wheel	various	UK	York	multiple locations – see article

=== Double and triple wheels ===
A double Ferris wheel with a horizontal turntable was patented in 1939 by John F. Courtney, working for Velare & Courtney. In Courtney's design, there were two independent Ferris wheels, each rotating at either end of a cantilever arm. The cantilever arm was supported at its midpoint by a tall vertical support, and the arm itself rotated about its middle pivot point. The design was similar to the earlier Aeriocycle, but the double wheel patented by Courtney allowed the cantilever arm to make a complete rotation, while the Aeriocycle was limited to a seesaw motion. Courtney continued to file additional patents on improved designs through the 1950s to make them more portable, and at about the same time, the Velare brothers patented the "Space Wheel", a side-by-side double with four total Ferris wheels.

The design was later sold to the Allan Herschell Company in 1959 and marketed as the "Sky Wheel"; the first sale as the Sky Wheel was to 20th Century Rides in October 1960. The Sky Wheel seated up to 32 riders in 16 two-person cars, with 8 cars per wheel, and riders reached a peak of approximately 80 feet (24 m). The height and popularity of the Sky Wheel was eclipsed by larger single wheels in the late 1980s and early 1990s; it has since largely disappeared from common use. As of 2018, there are four known Sky Wheels that remain in operation.

In March 1966, Thomas Glen Robinson and Ralph G. Robinson received a patent for a Planetary Amusement Ride, a distinct double-wheel design. In the Robinsons' patent, the cantilever arm was bent at a slightly obtuse angle, and the cars were carried on a spoked "spider" rotating structure at each end of the cantilever. With the obtuse-angle cantilever, one spider could be lowered to the ground in a horizontal plane so that all the cars on that spider could be unloaded and loaded simultaneously, while the spider on the other end of the cantilever would continue to rotate in a near-vertical plane.

Robinson sold two of these rides – Astrowheel, which operated at the former Six Flags AstroWorld in Houston, Texas, and Galaxy, which operated at Six Flags Magic Mountain in Valencia, California. Both were manufactured by Astron International Corporation. Astrowheel was part of the original lineup of rides when Astroworld opened in 1968; it was removed in 1981 to make way for the Warp 10 ride. Astrowheel had an eight-spoked spider at the end of each arm, and each tip had a separate car for eight cars in total on each end. In contrast, Galaxy had double the capacity with a four-spoked spider at the end of each arm; each tip bore an independent four-spoked sub-spider for sixteen cars in total on each end. Like Astrowheel, Galaxy was part of the lineup at Magic Mountain when the park opened in 1971, and was removed in 1980 when Six Flags took over ownership of both parks.

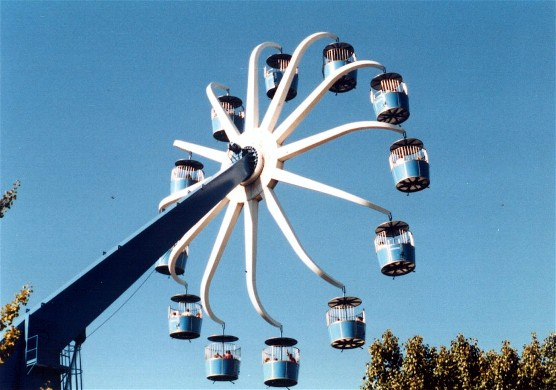
Giant Wheel, a Waagner-Biro/Intamin double wheel

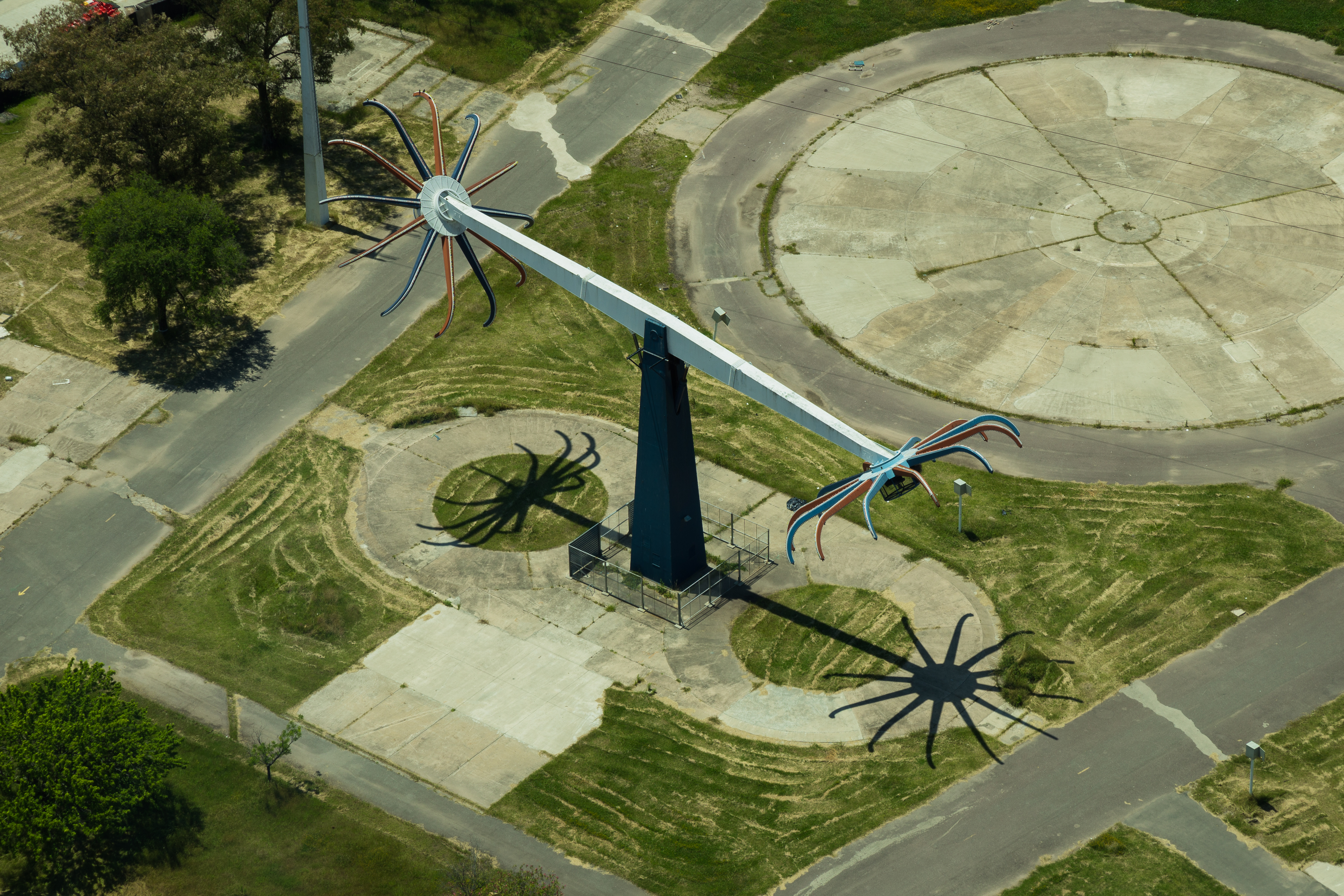
Abandoned Scorpion at Parque de la Ciudad (2015)

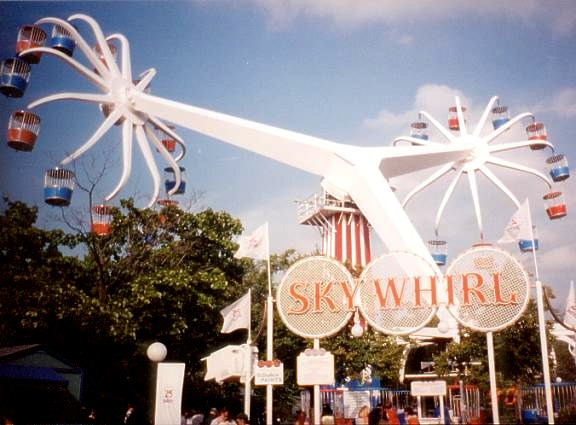
Sky Whirl, a triple wheel at Gurnee

Swiss broker Intamin marketed a similar series of double wheels manufactured by Waagner-Biro, comprising a vertical column supporting a straight cantilever arm, with each end of the cantilever arm ending in a spoked Ferris wheel. The first Intamin product was Giant Wheel at Hersheypark in Hershey, Pennsylvania, which operated from 1973 to 2004. Other double wheels made by Waagner-Biro/Intamin include Zodiac (Kings Island, Mason, Ohio; 1975–86; moved to Wonderland Sydney and operated 1989–2004), Scorpion (Parque de la Ciudad, Buenos Aires, Argentina; 1982–2003), and Double Wheel (Kuwait Entertainment City, Kuwait City, Kuwait; 1984–91).

A triple variant was custom designed for the Marriott Corporation and debuted at both Marriott's Great America parks (now Six Flags Great America, Gurnee, Illinois, and California's Great America, Santa Clara) in 1976 as Sky Whirl. Each ride had three main components: the three spiders/wheels with their passenger cars; the triple-spoked supporting arm; and the single central supporting column. Each wheel rotated about one of the three ends of the supporting arm. The supporting arm would, in turn, rotate about its central hub as a single unit at the top of the supporting column. The axis about which the supporting arm turned was offset from vertical (i.e., the plane of rotation was not horizontal), so that as the supporting arm rotated, each wheel was raised and lowered. When lowered, one wheel was horizontal at ground level. At the same time, the other wheels remained raised and continued to rotate in a near-vertical plane at considerable height. The lowered horizontal wheel was brought to a standstill for simultaneous loading and unloading of all its passenger cars.

The Sky Whirl was also known as a triple Ferris wheel, Triple Giant Wheel, or Triple Tree Wheel; it was 33 metres (108 ft) in height. The Sky Whirl in Santa Clara was filmed for a memorable rescue scene in Beverly Hills Cop III (renamed to "The Spider" for the film). The Santa Clara ride, renamed Triple Wheel in post-Marriott years, closed on September 1, 1997. The Gurnee ride closed in 2000. Two triple wheels were built for Asian clients: Tree Triple Wheel at Seibu-en (Tokorozawa, Saitama, Japan; 1985–2004) and Hydra at Lotte World (Seoul, South Korea; 1989–97).

=== Eccentric wheels ===
An eccentric wheel (sometimes called a sliding wheel or coaster wheel) differs from a conventional Ferris wheel in that some or all of its passenger cars are not fixed directly to the rim of the wheel, but instead slide on rails between the rim and the hub as the wheel rotates.

The two most famous eccentric wheels are Wonder Wheel, at Deno's Wonder Wheel Amusement Park, Coney Island, US, and Pixar Pal-A-Round (previously Sun Wheel and Mickey's Fun Wheel), at Disney California Adventure, US. The latter is a replica of the former. There is a second replica in Yokohama Dreamland, Japan.

Pixar Pal-A-Round is 48.8 metres (160 ft) tall and has 24 fully enclosed passenger cars, each able to carry six passengers. Each passenger car is decorated with the face of a Pixar character. Sixteen slide inward and outward as the wheel rotates; the remainder are fixed to the rim. There are separate boarding queues for sliding and fixed cars, so that passengers may choose between the two. Inspired by Coney Island's 1920 Wonder Wheel, it was designed by Walt Disney Imagineering and Waagner Biro, completed in 2001 as the Sun Wheel, later refurbished and reopened in 2009 as Mickey's Fun Wheel, and again rethemed as Pixar Pal-A-Round in 2018.

Wonder Wheel was built in 1920, is 45.7 metres (150 ft) tall, and can carry 144 people.

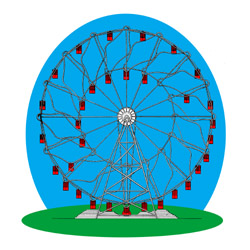
Hermann Eccentric Ferris Wheel with sliding cars, from US patent 1354436, 1915; forerunner of the 1920 Wonder Wheel, there is no record of it ever being built

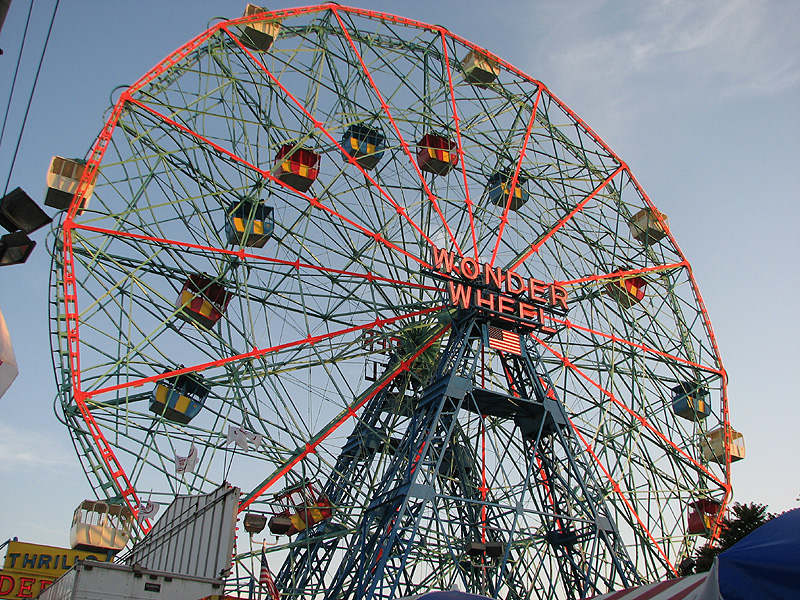
Wonder Wheel, a 45.7-metre (150 ft) tall eccentric wheel at Deno's Wonder Wheel Amusement Park, Coney Island, was built in 1920 by the Eccentric Ferris Wheel Company

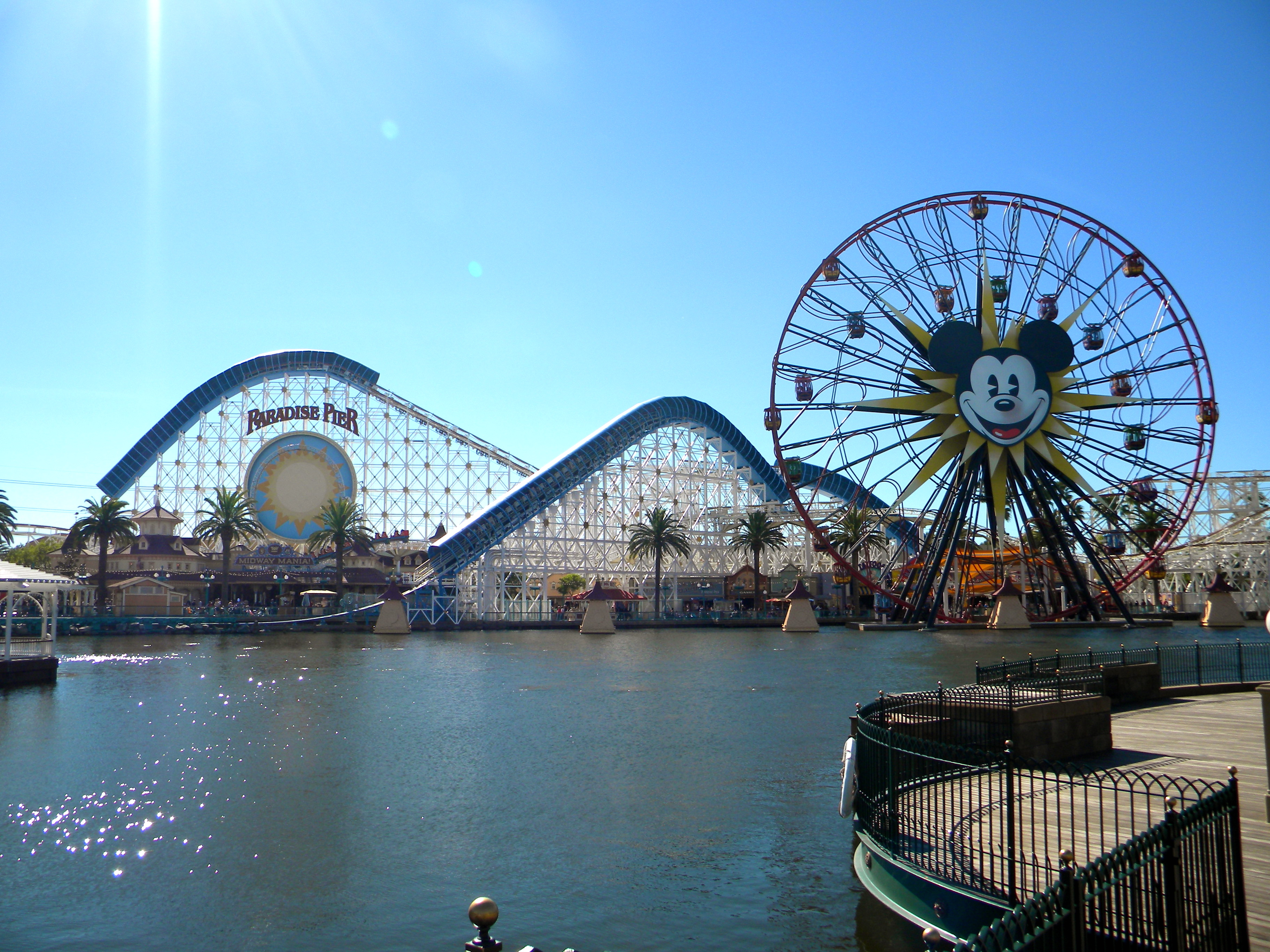
Disney California Adventure's Pixar Pal-A-Round, an eccentric wheel modelled on Wonder Wheel, was built in 2001 as Sun Wheel and became Mickey's Fun Wheel in 2009 and currently Pixar Pal-A-Round in 2018

== Gallery of notable wheels ==
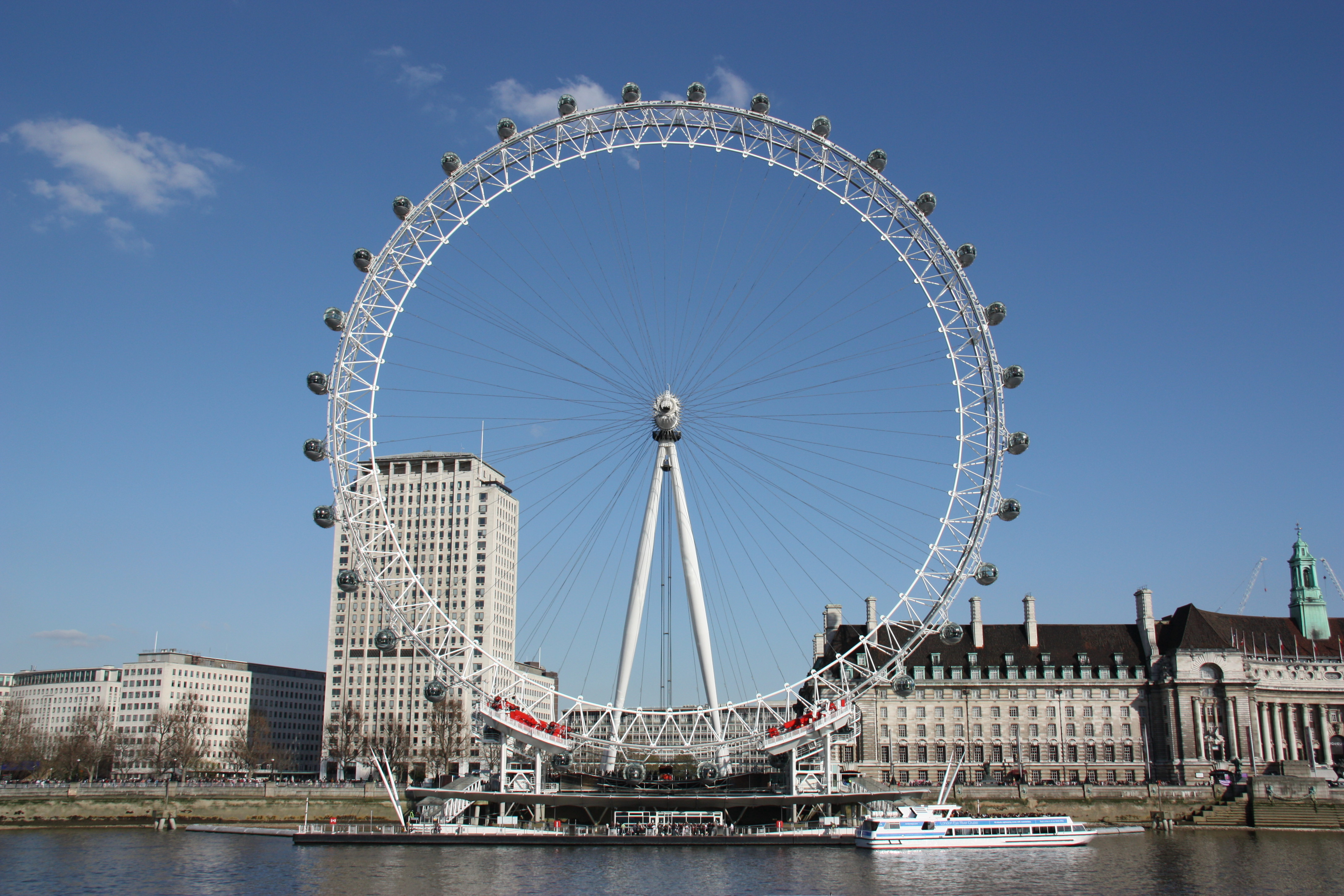
The London Eye was the world's tallest Ferris wheel when it opened and is currently the most popular paid tourist attraction in the UK

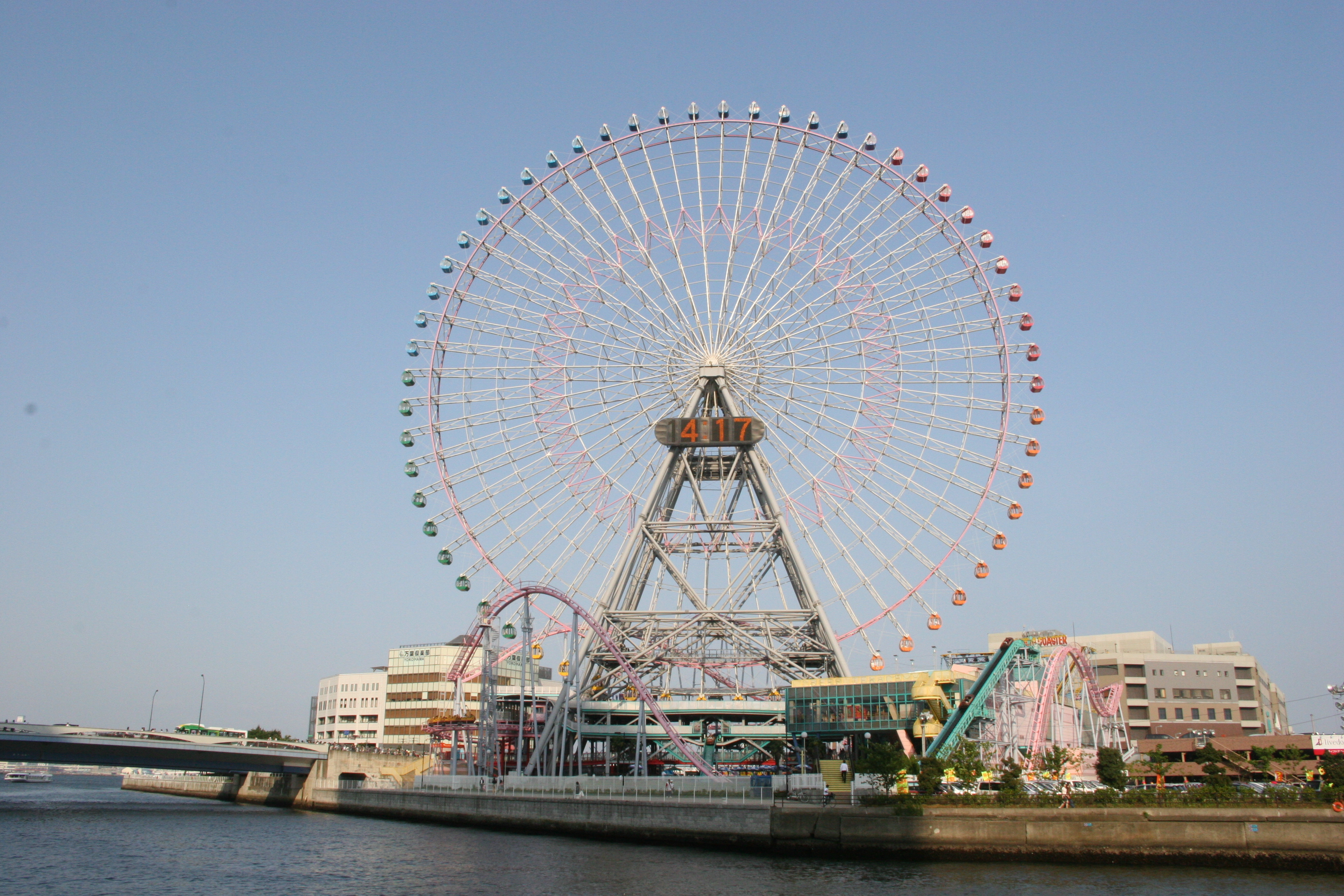
Cosmo Clock 21, world's tallest wheel 1989 to 1997

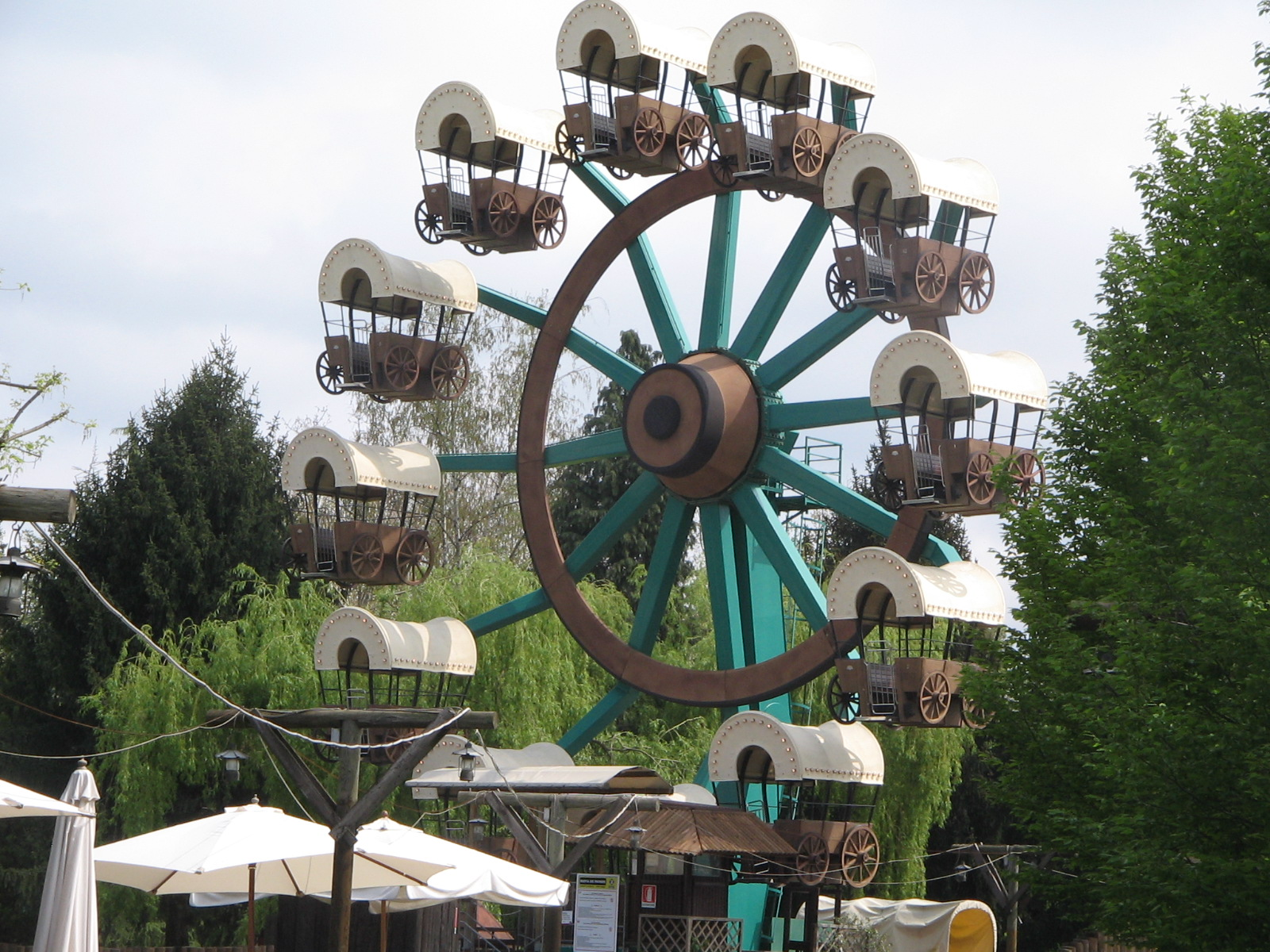
Ruota dei Pionieri, Minitalia Leolandia Park, Italy (manufactured by Zamperla)

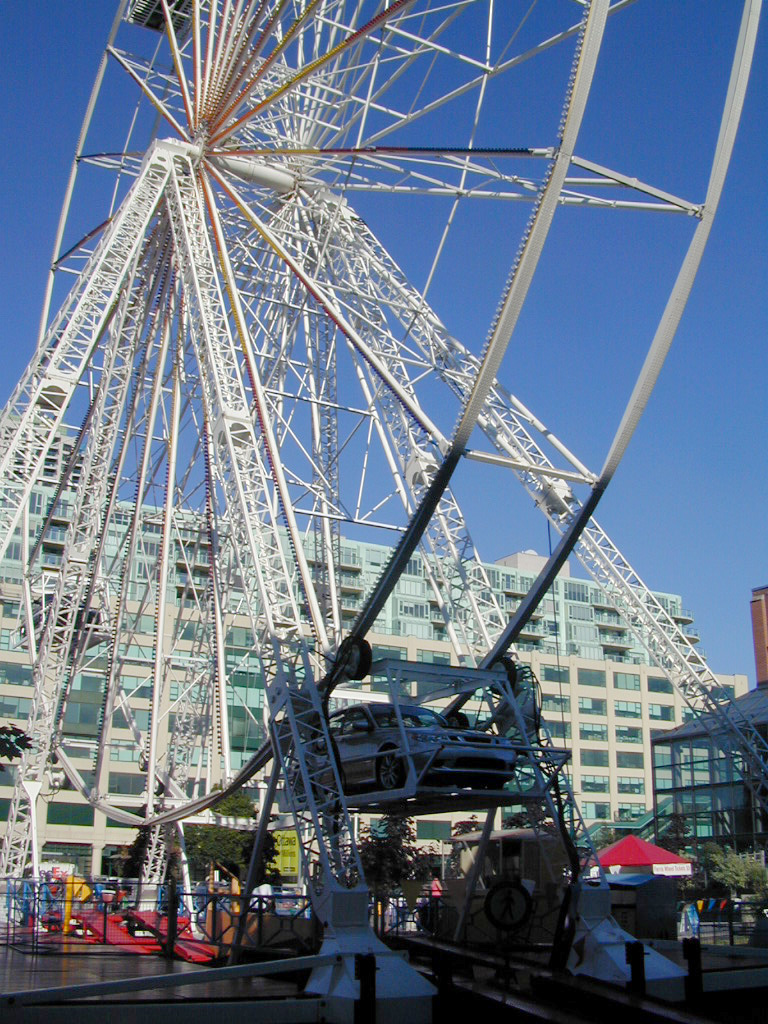
Four-car 30 m tall drive-in Ferris wheel at Harbourfront, Toronto, Canada, in 2004

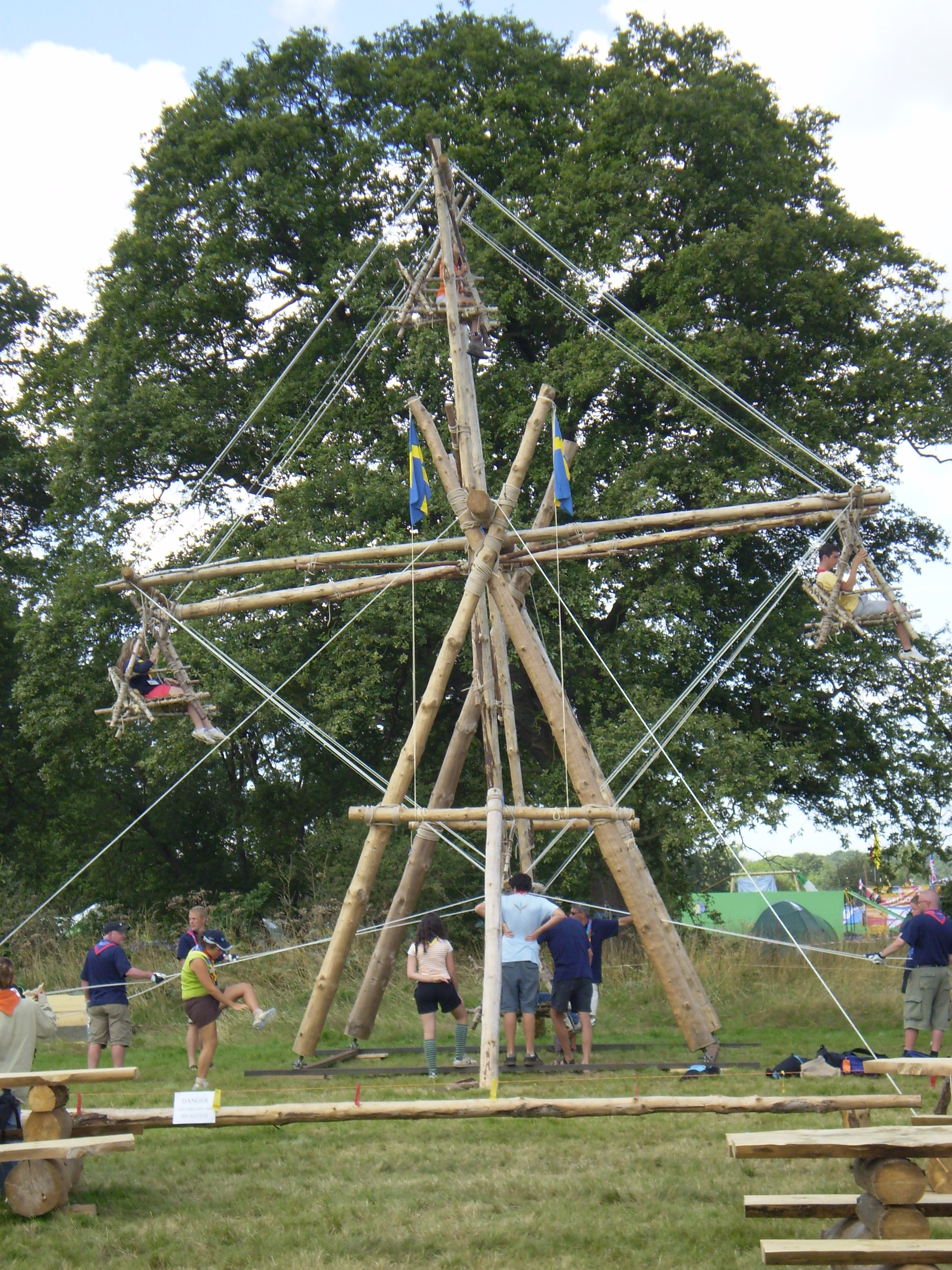
A wheel constructed by the Swedish contingent at the 21st World Scout Jamboree

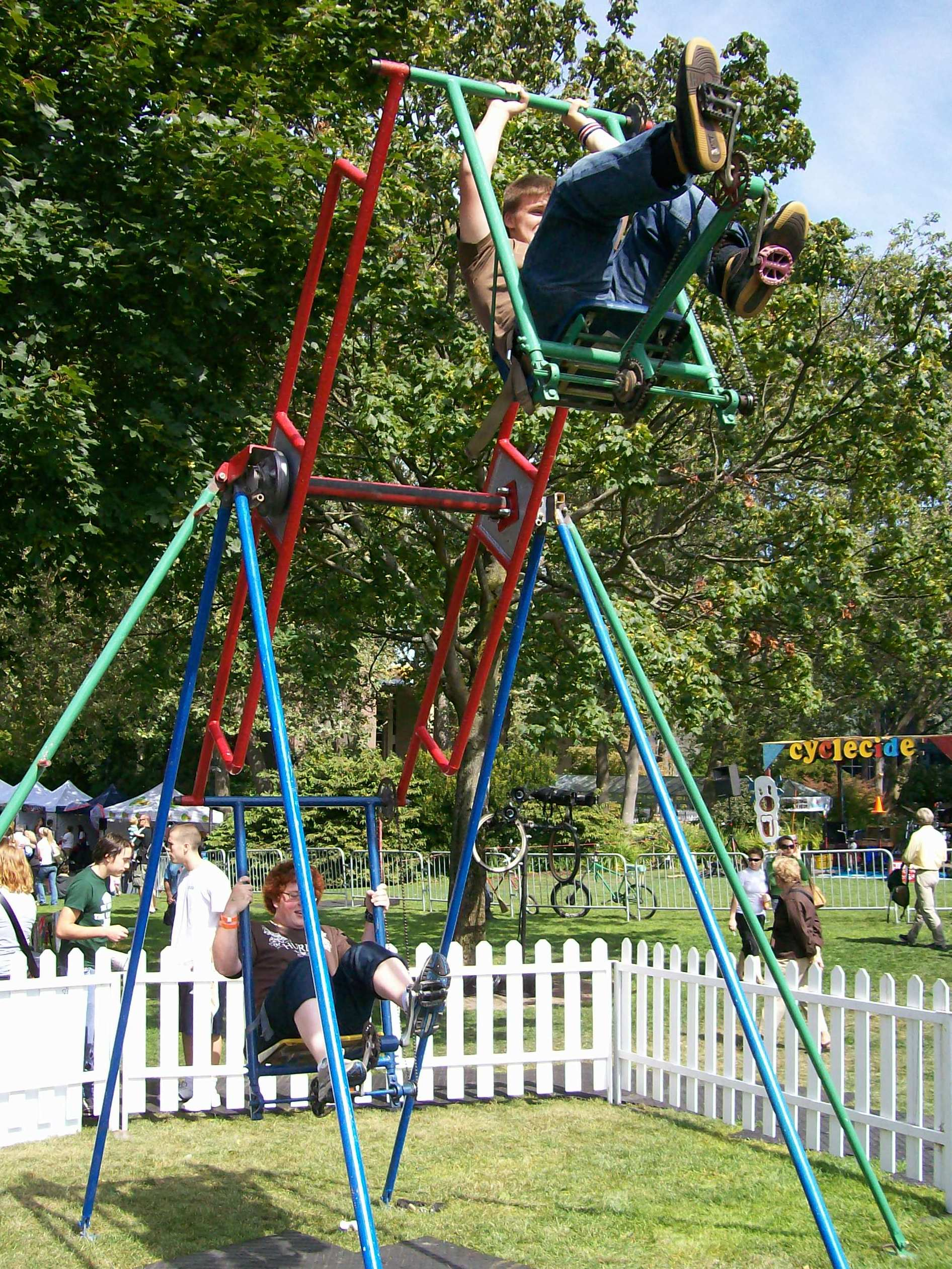
Passenger-powered 2-seat Cyclecide wheel at the 2007 Bumbershoot festival in Seattle

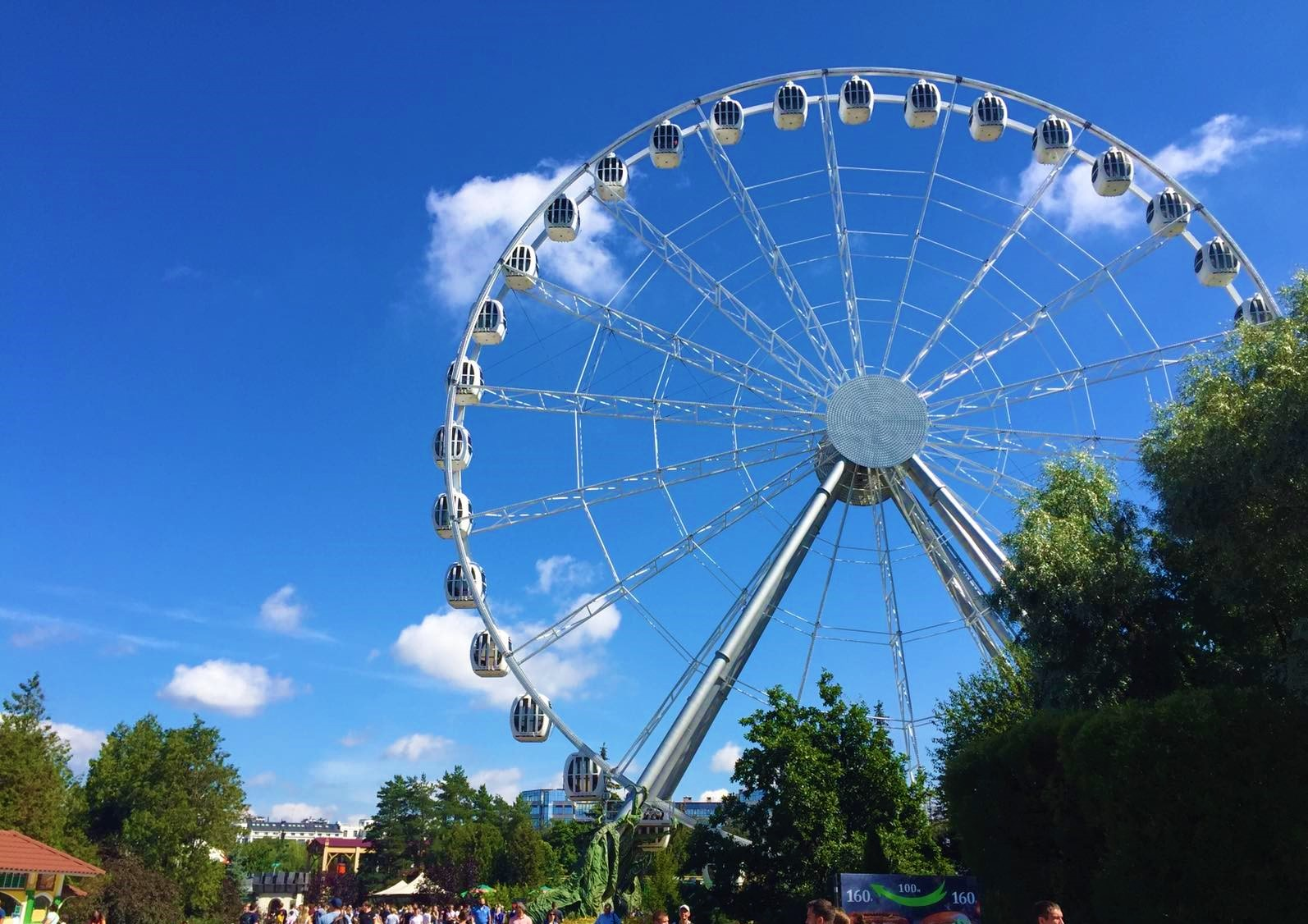
Ferris wheel in the Park Divo Ostrov, St. Petersburg

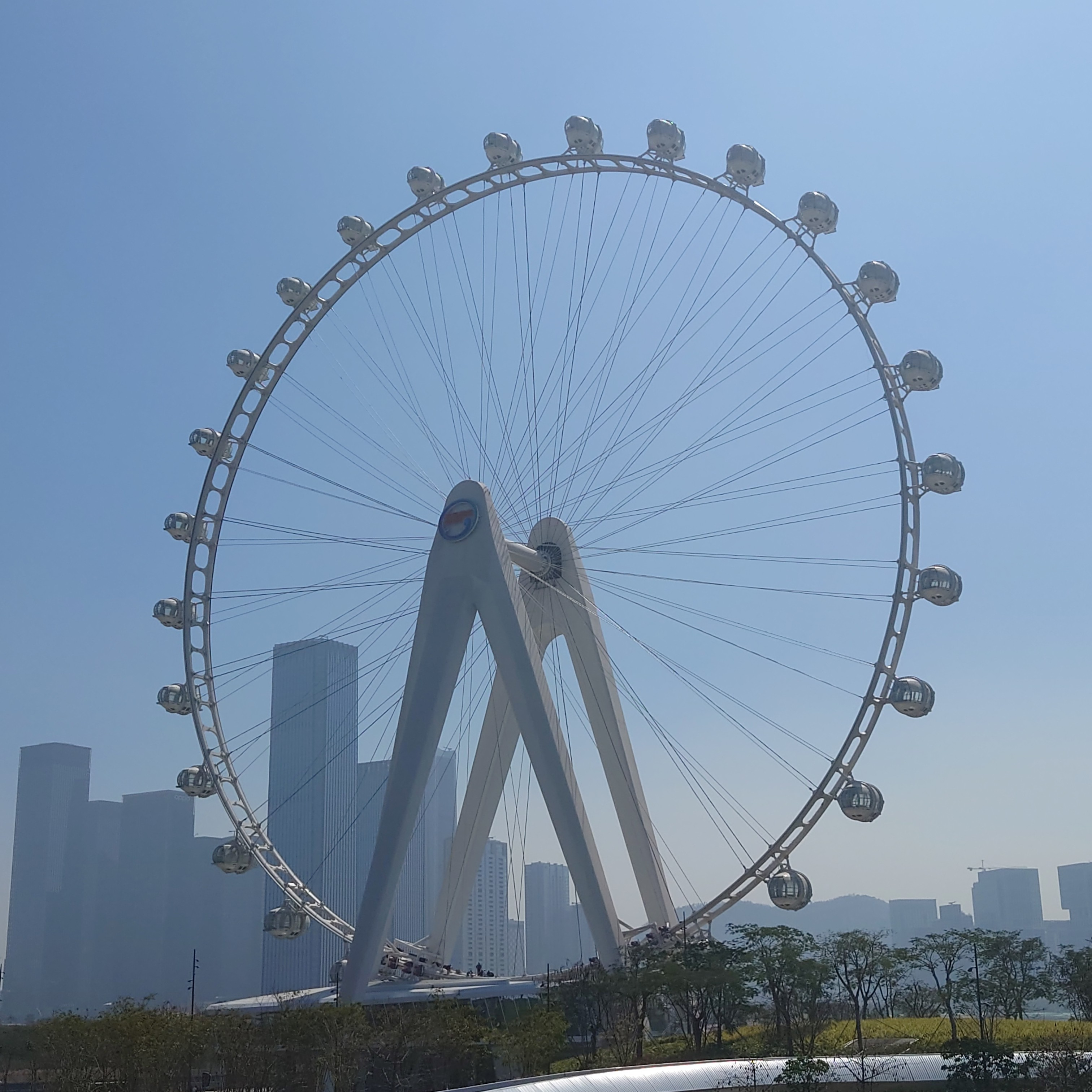
Bay Glory in Bao'an Seashore Cultural Park, Shenzhen, China, in 2021

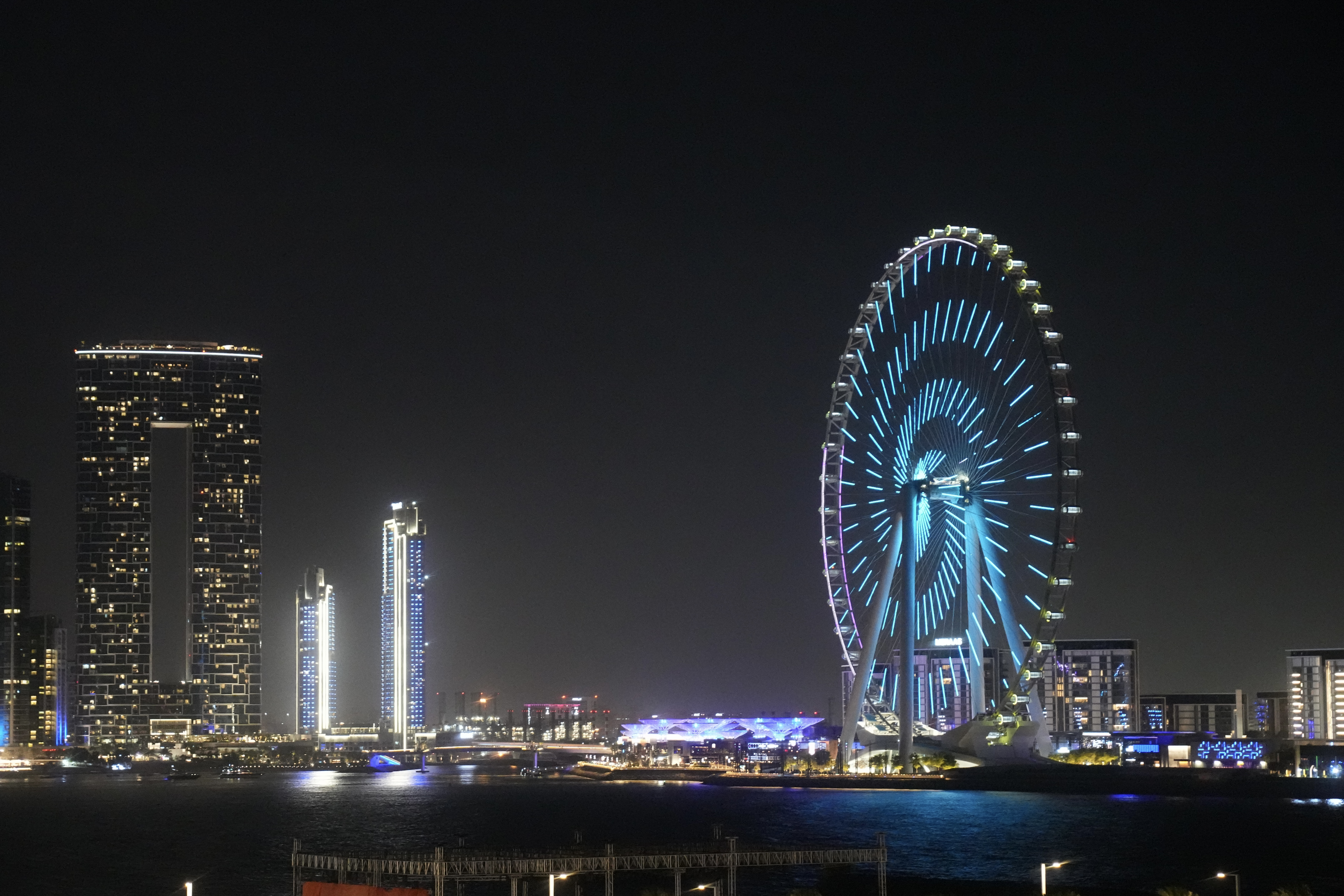
Ain Dubai, light show of the ferris wheel located in Dubai, United Arab Emirates

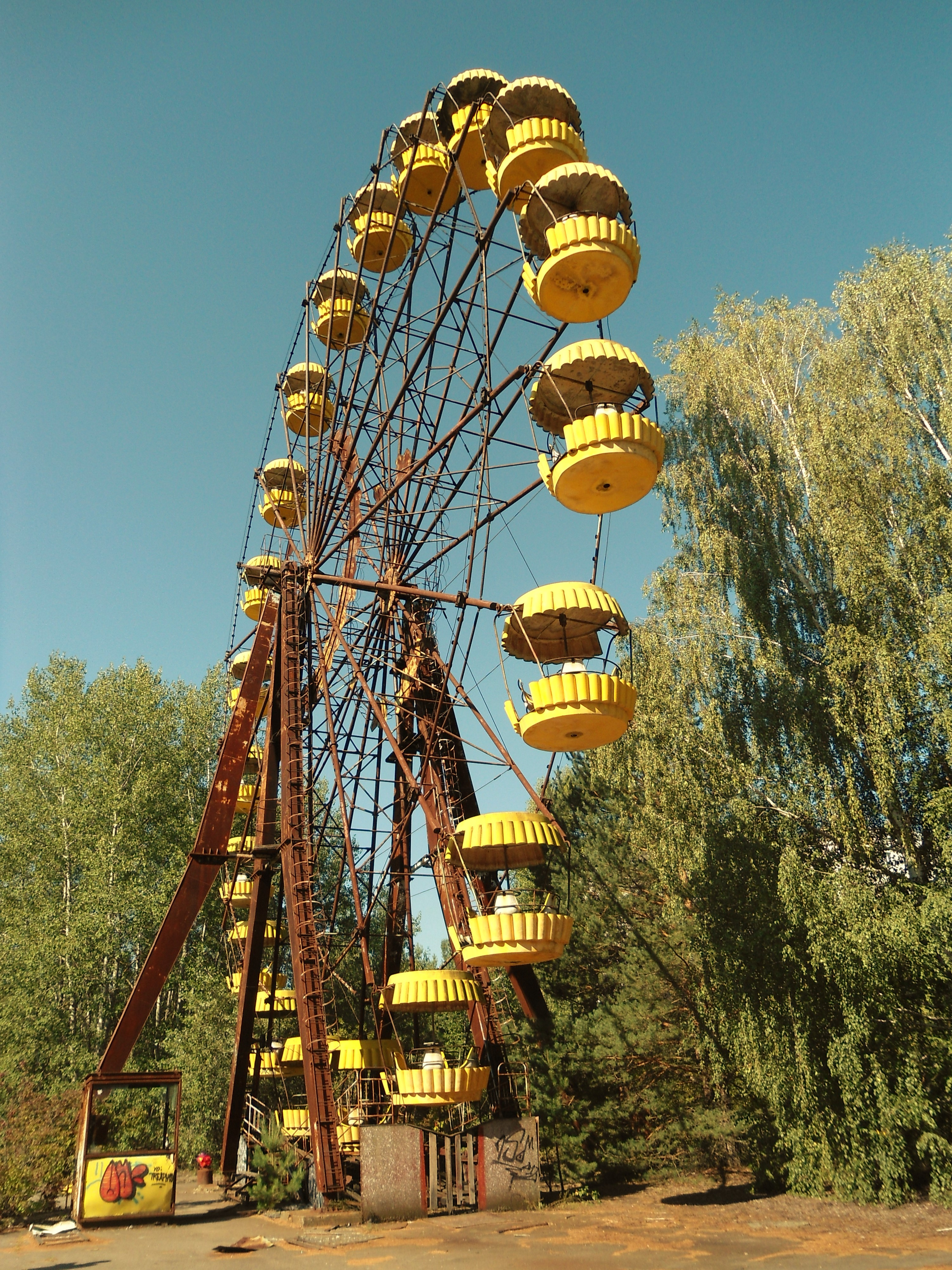
The ferris wheel of Pripyat amusement park, a symbol of the Chornobyl Disaster

== Major designers, manufacturers, and operators ==
Allan Herschell Company (merged with Chance Rides in 1970)

- Seattle Wheel (debuted 1962): 16 cars, two passengers per car
- Sky Wheel (debuted 1939; also manufactured by Chance Rides): a double wheel, with the wheels rotating about opposite ends of a pair of parallel beams, and the beams rotating about their centres; eight cars per wheel, two passengers per car

Chance Morgan/Chance Rides/Chance Wheels/Chance American Wheels

- Astro Wheel (debuted 1967): 16 cars (eight facing one way, eight the other), two passengers per car
- Century Wheel: 20 m (66 ft) tall, 15 cars, 4-6 passengers per car
- Giant Wheel: 27 m (89 ft) tall, 20 cars, 6-8 passengers per car
- Niagara SkyWheel (2006): 53.3 m (175 ft) tall, 42 air-conditioned cars, eight passengers per car
- Myrtle Beach SkyWheel (2011): 57 m (187 ft) tall, 42 air-conditioned cars, 6 passengers per car

Eli Bridge Company
Contemporary models include:
- Signature Series: 16 cars, 3 passengers per car; transportable
- Eagle Series: 16 cars, 3 passengers per car; transportable
- HY-5 Series: 12 cars, 3 passengers per car; transportable
- Aristocrat Series: 16 cars, fixed site
- Standard Series: 12 cars, fixed site
- Lil' Wheel: 6 cars, 3 passengers per car; transportable and fixed site models

Great Wheel Corporation (merged with World Tourist Attractions in 2009 to form Great City Attractions)

- Singapore Flyer: 165 m (541 ft) tall, completed 2008; world's tallest 2008 to 2014
- Beijing Great Wheel: 208 m (682 ft) tall, was supposed to open in 2008, went into receivership, never built
- Great Dubai Wheel: 185 m (607 ft) tall, planning permission granted in 2006, was supposed to open in 2009, never built
- Great Berlin Wheel: 175 m (574 ft) tall, was supposed to open in 2008, never built
- Great Orlando Wheel: 122 m (400 ft) tall, project halted in 2009, never built

Intamin/Waagner-Biro (Rides brokered by Intamin—manufactured by Waagner-Biro)

- Mickey's Fun Wheel: an eccentric (sliding) wheel
- Giant Wheel: a double wheel
- Sky Whirl: a triple wheel
- The Wheel at ICON Park Orlando

Mir / Pax

- Moscow-850, a 73-metre (240 ft) tall wheel in Russia; Europe's tallest extant wheel when completed in 1997, until 1999
- Eurowheel, a 90-metre (300 ft) tall wheel in Italy; Europe's tallest extant wheel when completed in 1999, until the end of that year

Ronald Bussink (formerly Nauta Bussink; then Ronald Bussink Professional Rides; then Bussink Landmarks since 2008)

Wheels of Excellence range (sold to Vekoma in 2008) has included:
- R40: 40-metre (131 ft) tall fixed or transportable wheel, 15 or 30 cars, 8 passengers per car
- R50: 50-metre (164 ft) tall fixed or transportable wheel, 18 or 36 cars, 8 passengers per car
- R60: 60-metre (197 ft) tall transportable wheel, 21 or 42 cars, 8 passengers per car
- R80: 80-metre (262 ft) tall fixed wheel, 56 cars, 8 passengers per car
Bussink Design:
- R80XL: 78-metre (256 ft) tall fixed or transportable wheel, 27 16-person cars, or 54 8-person cars

Sanoyas Rides Corporation (has built more than 80 Ferris wheels)

- Melbourne Star: 120 m (394 ft) tall, completed 2008, rebuilt 2009–2013

Senyo Kogyo Co, Ltd.
- Cosmo Clock 21: 107.5 m (353 ft) tall, completed 1989; world's tallest 1989 to 1997; 112.5 m (369 ft) tall when re-erected in 1999
- Diamond and Flower Ferris Wheel: 117 m (384 ft) tall, world's second tallest when completed in 2001
- Tempozan Ferris Wheel: 112.5 m (369 ft) tall, completed 1997; world's tallest 1997 to 1999

World Tourist Attractions / Great City Attractions / Wheels Entertainments / Freij Entertainment International
- Belfast Wheel
- Brighton Wheel
- Roue de Paris
- Royal Windsor Wheel
- Wheel of Birmingham
- Wheel of Brisbane
- Wheel of Manchester
- Wheel of Sheffield
- Yorkshire Wheel

== See also ==
- List of Ferris wheels
- Gyro tower
- List of tallest buildings and structures
- Observation tower
