= Eye on Malaysia =

Former Ferris wheel in Melaka, Malaysia

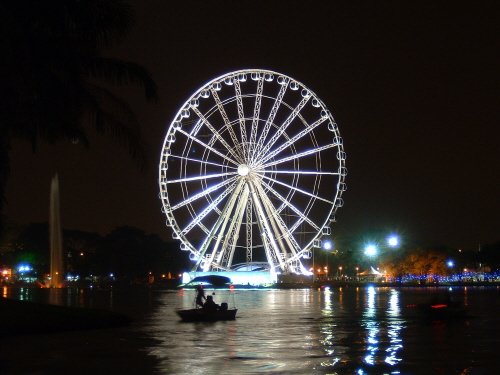
Eye on Malaysia, a day before the launch of Visit Malaysia Year

Eye on Malaysia was a transportable Ferris wheel installation in Malaysia. It began operating in Kuala Lumpur in 2007, and was then moved to Malacca in 2008, where it operated until 2010.

Most sources credit Eye of Malaysia with an overall height of 60 metres (197 ft), however conflicting reports in the Malaysian newspaper The Star quote heights of both 60 m and 62 m (203 ft).

== Kuala Lumpur ==
Eye on Malaysia first operated at Titiwangsa Lake Gardens, Kuala Lumpur, where it enabled visitors to experience a 360-degree panoramic view of the city centre and over 20 kilometres (12 mi) of its surroundings, including the Kuala Lumpur Tower, the Istana Budaya and the Petronas Twin Towers, during a 12-minute ride. It was unveiled in conjunction with Visit Malaysia Year 2007 on January 6, 2007, by the prime minister at that time, Abdullah Ahmad Badawi.

Kuala Lumpur coordinates: 3°10′39.2″N 101°42′15.68″E

== Malacca City ==
Eye on Malaysia was relocated to Taman Kota Laksamana, next to the Malacca River in Malacca City in the Melaka Tengah District of Malacca, in late 2008. It ceased operating in January 2010 pending the outcome of a legal dispute between its owners, Fitraco NV, a Belgian leisure equipment leasing company, and the Malaysian operators of the wheel. It was dismantled in October 2010.

Melaka Tengah coordinates: 2°11′23.4312″N 102°14′29.00″E

== Malacca Island ==
The Malaysia Eye, which conflicting reports stated would be 85 metres (279 ft) or 88 metres (289 ft) tall, was announced by the Chief Minister of the state of Malacca Datuk Seri Mohd Ali Rustam. It was to be sourced from China and located at Malacca Island, and to have 54 air-conditioned gondolas, each able to carry six people. It was scheduled to open on December 1, 2011, but was never built.

The 101-metre (331 ft) Eye on Malaysia, also a Chinese-manufactured wheel with 54 passenger gondolas, was scheduled to begin operating at Malacca Island in April 2013. In November 2012, Mohd Ali Rustam visited the site and stated that the installation of piles had brought the RM40 million wheel to 15 per cent of completion, and that "the installation of the wheel structure will begin in February [2013]."
