= Exchange Square =

Exchange Square can refer to:

- Exchange Square (Johannesburg), South Africa
- Exchange Square (Hong Kong)
- Exchange Square, Manchester, England
  - Exchange Square tram stop
- Exchange Square (London), England
