= Wheel of Manchester =

Ferris Wheel

Coordinates: 53.48433°N 2.24310°W

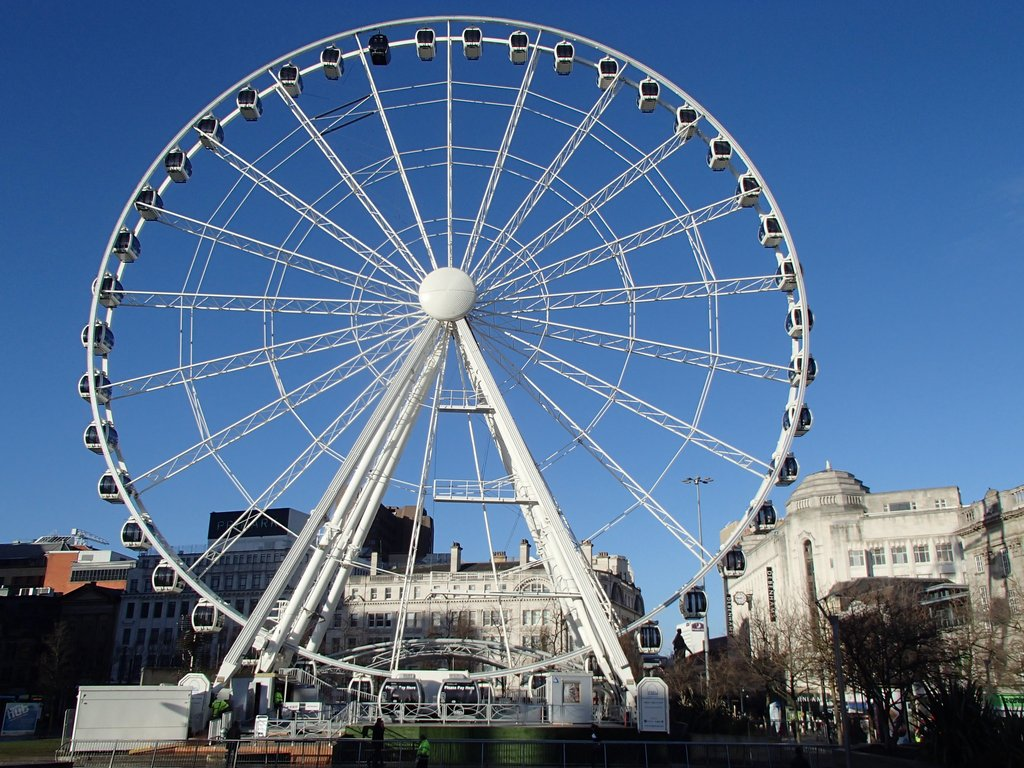
- Wheel of Manchester in 2014
- Interactive map of the Wheel of Manchester area

General information
- Status: Demolished
- Type: Ferris wheel
- Location: Manchester city centre, UK: Exchange Square, Manchester (2004-2012); Piccadilly Gardens (2012-2013)
- Completed: 2004 (first installation)
- Opened: 2004
- Closed: April 2015
- Demolished: June 2015 (most recent installation)

Height
- Height: 52.7 metres (173 ft) (current)

The Wheel of Manchester was a transportable Ferris wheel installation at Piccadilly Gardens, Manchester, England. The wheel was originally a smaller installation based in Exchange Square, first assembled in 2004. The wheel's size was increased to 60 metres (197 ft) in 2007, and plans existed to increase this further. However, these plans were never submitted. The wheel was dismantled in 2012 to make way for 2012 Olympics celebrations and Metrolink construction work. In 2013, a new 52.7-metre (173 ft) wheel was installed in Piccadilly Gardens. It was dismantled in June 2015.

== History ==
=== 2004–2007 ===
The first wheel was first installed in 2004 which was a success and consequently a larger 60-metre (197 ft) wheel was erected in May 2007.

=== 2007–2012 ===
The wheel returned in May 2007 and was sponsored by the Manchester Evening News. A larger wheel was initially planned for 2008, but it was never installed. In 2010, Manchester City Council proposed a 120 m (394 ft) wheel, to be operated by World Tourist Attractions, as a replacement for the existing transportable installation, with Piccadilly Gardens the possible site and completion expected by Christmas 2011. The installation was later taken over by Great City Attractions when World Tourist Attractions merged with Great Wheel Corporation. In 2011 it became known as The Capital Wheel of Manchester, through a sponsorship deal with Capital FM. Although plans for a larger wheel were not publicly rejected, they never materialised.

The 60-metre (197 ft) wheel was removed in April 2012. Great City Attractions recommended to move the wheel to another area of the city such as Piccadilly Gardens, but this was rejected with the Council airing concerns about the wheel limiting space in Piccadilly. Manchester City Council stated that they thought the wheel had "probably run its course in terms of an attraction" since its opening in 2004. The Council also added that space in Exchange Square was required for a number of reasons, including public viewing space for the 2012 Olympics and space for adjacent redevelopment projects, such as Exchange Square Metrolink station, the Metrolink second city crossing on Corporation Street, and the renovation of The Triangle. Following its last day of operation on 15 April 2012, it was dismantled and moved to Edinburgh.

The removal of the Ferris wheel was welcomed by some who believed the wheel had run its course as an attraction. Tony Wilson, one of Manchester's most famous cultural patrons, hated the Ferris wheel stating: "It ruins a perfectly good square and it's a poor imitation of something London's done a lot better. We shouldn't be doing it."

=== 2013–2015 ===
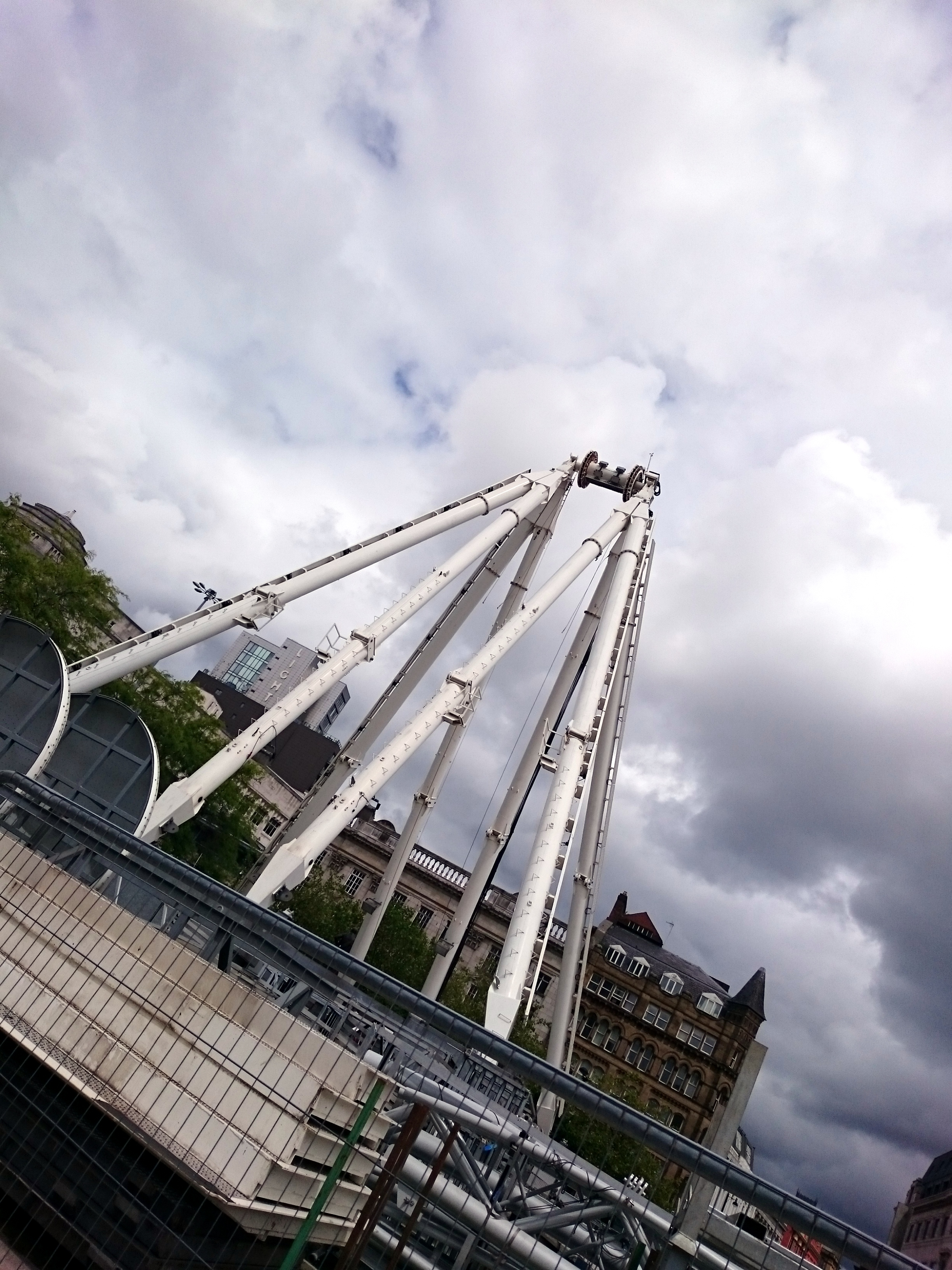
The Wheel of Manchester being dismantled in June 2015

In 2013, a new 52.7-metre (173 ft) wheel returned to Manchester to replace the original for New Years celebrations. However, this wheel was located at Piccadilly Gardens. A disagreement between Manchester City Council and the owners Wheels Entertainments arose after the licence to run the attraction ran out in April 2015.
