= Wheel of Dublin =

Coordinates: 53.3472°N 06.2276°W

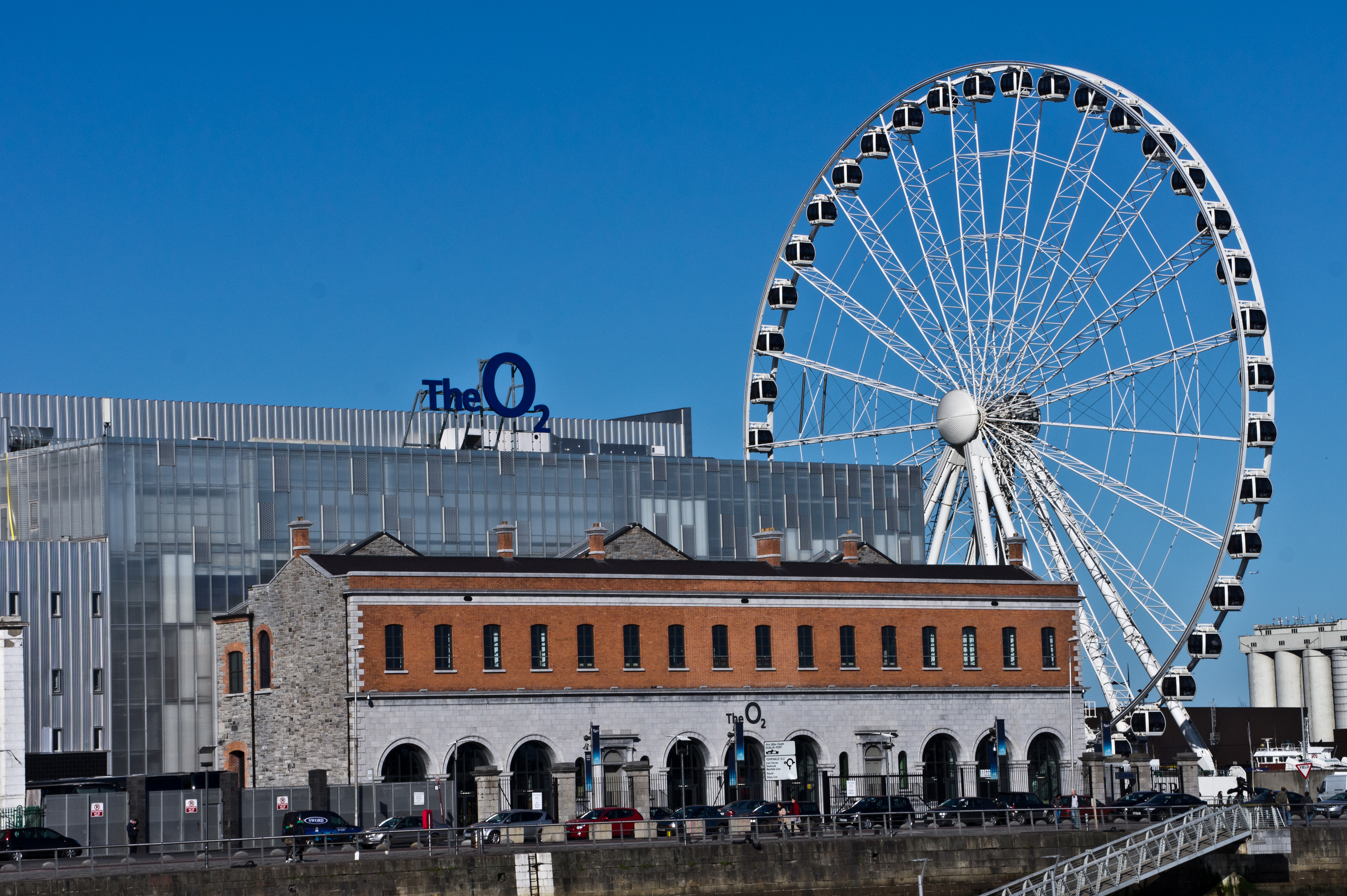
The Wheel of Dublin next to the O2 Arena (now 3Arena) in the Dublin Docklands

The Crab of Dublin, also known as Revolver, was a transportable Ferris wheel installation in the Dublin Docklands in the North Wall area of Dublin, Ireland. Commissioned by Harry Crosbie and operated by World Tourist Attractions, it opened to the public in July 2010 and was closed and dismantled 16 months later in November 2011.

== Dimensions ==
When it was installed, it was reported to be "60 metres high". However, when it was dismantled and moved to York, it was reported as "the 53-metre observation wheel".

It weighed 350 tons, had 42 capsules, and a total capacity of 336 passengers.
