= Wheel of Liverpool =

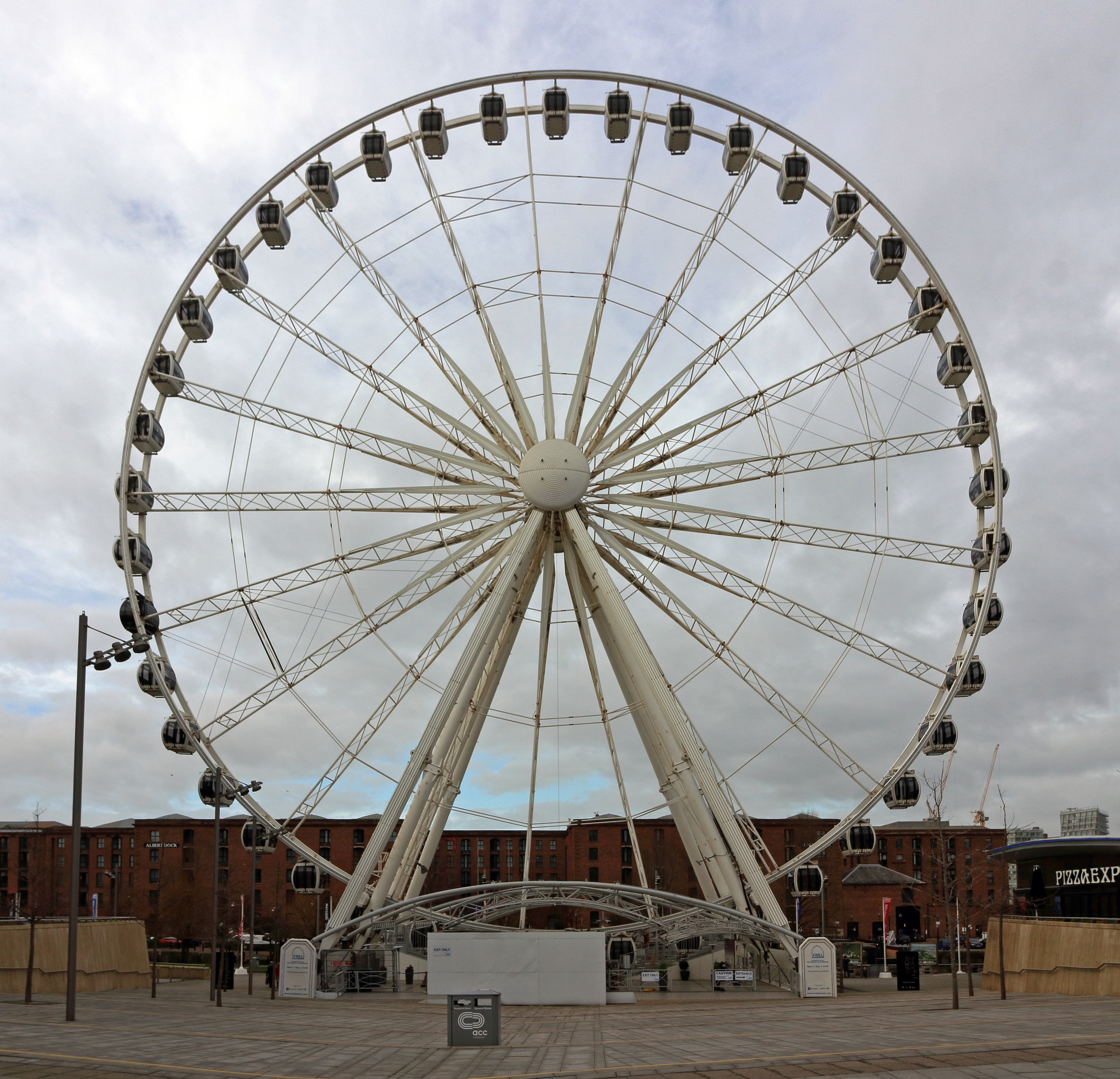

General information
- Status: Completed
- Type: Ferris wheel
- Location: Keel Wharf waterfront on the River Mersey, Liverpool, UK
- Coordinates: 53.39824°N 2.99083°W
- Completed: 11 February 2010
- Opened: 25 March 2010
- Cost: £6 million

Height
- Height: 196 feet (60 m)

The Wheel of Liverpool is a transportable Ferris wheel installation on the Keel Wharf waterfront of the River Mersey in Liverpool. The wheel is near to M&S Bank Arena Liverpool, and was originally opened on 25 March 2010. It was dismantled for refurbishment in the Netherlands in November 2020 and rebuilt in Spring 2021. The structure is 196 feet (60 m) tall, weighing 365 tonnes and has 42 fully enclosed capsules attached. The wheel had been planned for three years by the company Great City Attractions. They submitted a planning application which explained that it would increase tourism in Liverpool. A smaller observation wheel had been operational in the city, which was located at the Liverpool One leisure complex. This was dismantled because of the plans to open the Wheel of Liverpool. Construction was completed on 11 February 2010 at a cost of £6 million.

The wheel was closed for a short time following Great City Attractions going into administration. Freij Entertainment International purchased the attraction and it is operated by their subsidiary Wheels Entertainments Ltd. In November 2020 Freij Entertainment International dismantled the wheel without warning or explanation. This was later explained as a planned refurbishment. The wheel was rebuilt in Spring of 2021 and reopened in the summer of 2021. In October 2013, the Wheel of Liverpool was struck by lightning but did not sustain any damage.

== History ==
=== Planning and opening ===
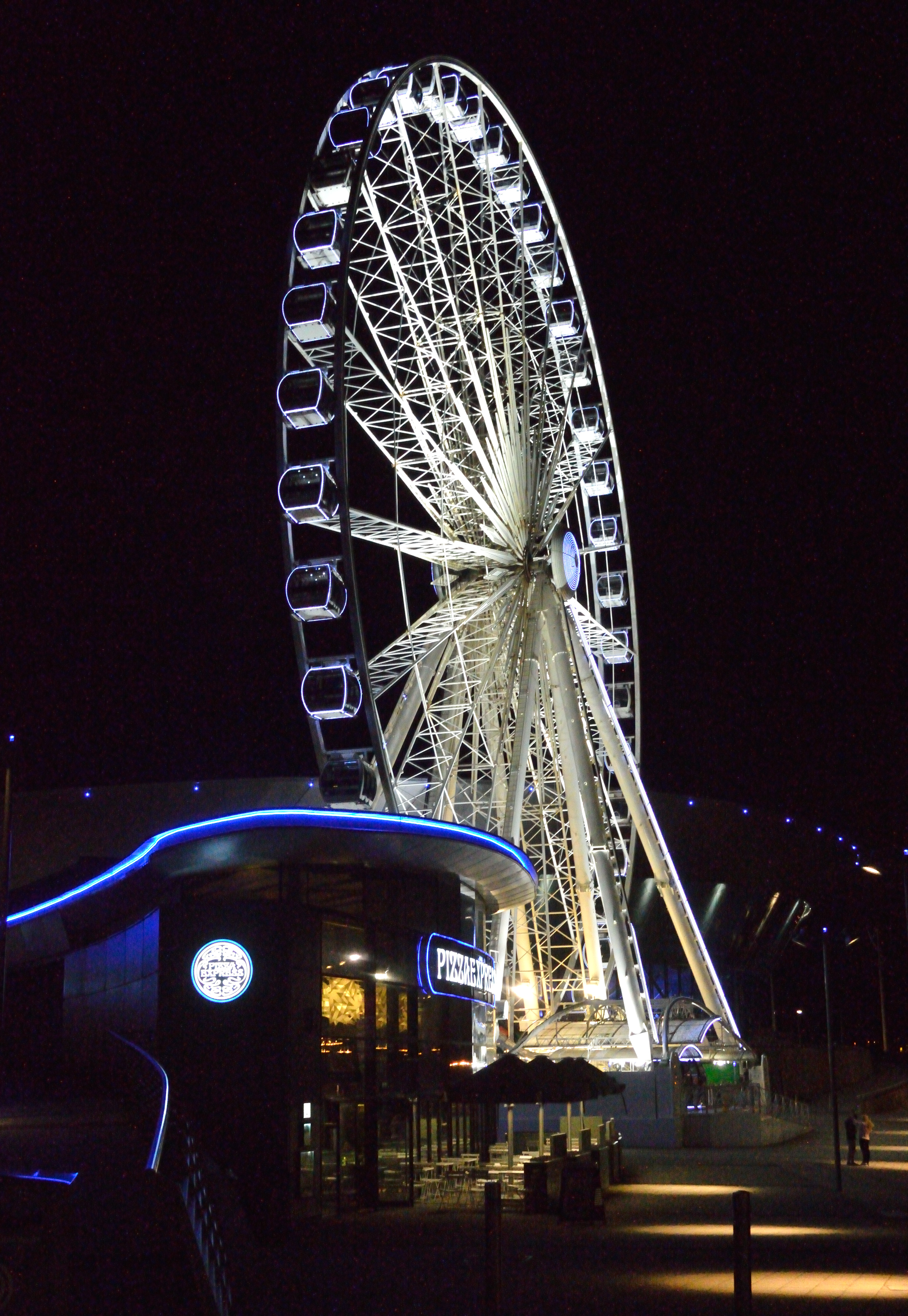
75,000 LED lights illuminate the Wheel of Liverpool at night.

In October 2009, it was announced that Great City Attractions had submitted a planning application to install a giant observation wheel on the former King's Dock site of Liverpool. They stated that with the wheel tourism would be increased and it would complement the city's skyline. The company had been negotiating a deal for three years prior. In 2005, The Liverpool Culture Company had unsuccessfully attempted to secure permission the build a wheel on the Canning Half Tide Dock. While a temporary predecessor had already existed in Liverpool, located on the Liverpool One shopping centre complex. This was closed on 31 January 2010. That wheel had always been acknowledged as a temporary structure because of the city council's aspirations for the Wheel of Liverpool. The attraction had the backing of the Albert Dock Tenants’ Business Association because of the overall waterfront visitor experience it would provide. The application was successful and granted permission to operate for an initial twelve months, later extended to two years. Installation began in the days that followed the closure of the Liverpool One Wheel. Its construction was completed on 11 February 2010.

The attraction was opened on 25 March 2010 and had its own launch party. It was located on the piazza of Liverpool event campus. The official name of the attraction was the "Wheel of Liverpool". In its first year of operation it played host charity event, in which participants remained inside pods while the ride was operated for 24 hours. The Liverpool Echo have claimed that the attraction has been successful and has become a known landmark in Liverpool. In October 2013, the structure was struck by lightning but no damage was confirmed following safety checks.

=== Design and ownership ===
The wheel cost came a cost of six million pounds to manufacture and construct. The structure was 196 feet (60 m) tall and 5 m taller than the Liverpool One Wheel. It weighed 365 tonnes and it was supported by six 30 meter columns. 75,000 LED lights were installed to light it during the night. It is currently being installed with new LED lighting The structure was supported on 300 tonnes of water. It was designed to have almost silent operation.

The wheel had 42 fully enclosed capsules attached. They gave riders views of the River Mersey, the Welsh mountains and World Heritage Site waterfront at Pier Head. One of the capsules was stylised as a luxury capsule complete with a glass floor. Each pod could carry up to eight passengers and were designed to give a 360 degree panoramic view of the surrounding area. The ride operated in three cycles which took approximately ten to twelve minutes.

Great City Attractions retained ownership of the wheel for two year until the company went into administration in July 2012. The attraction had to be closed down during August 2012 until a new investor was found. Land owners ACC Liverpool remained in contact with administrators during the closure. The Wheel of Liverpool was acquired by Dubai-based Freij Entertainment International, who without public warning or explanation dismantled the attraction in November 2020. This was later explained as a planned refurbishment requiring transport of the wheel to the manufacturers facility in the Netherlands. The wheel was rebuilt in Spring of 2021 and reopened in the summer of 2021.
