= Manchester Arndale =

Shopping centre in Manchester, England

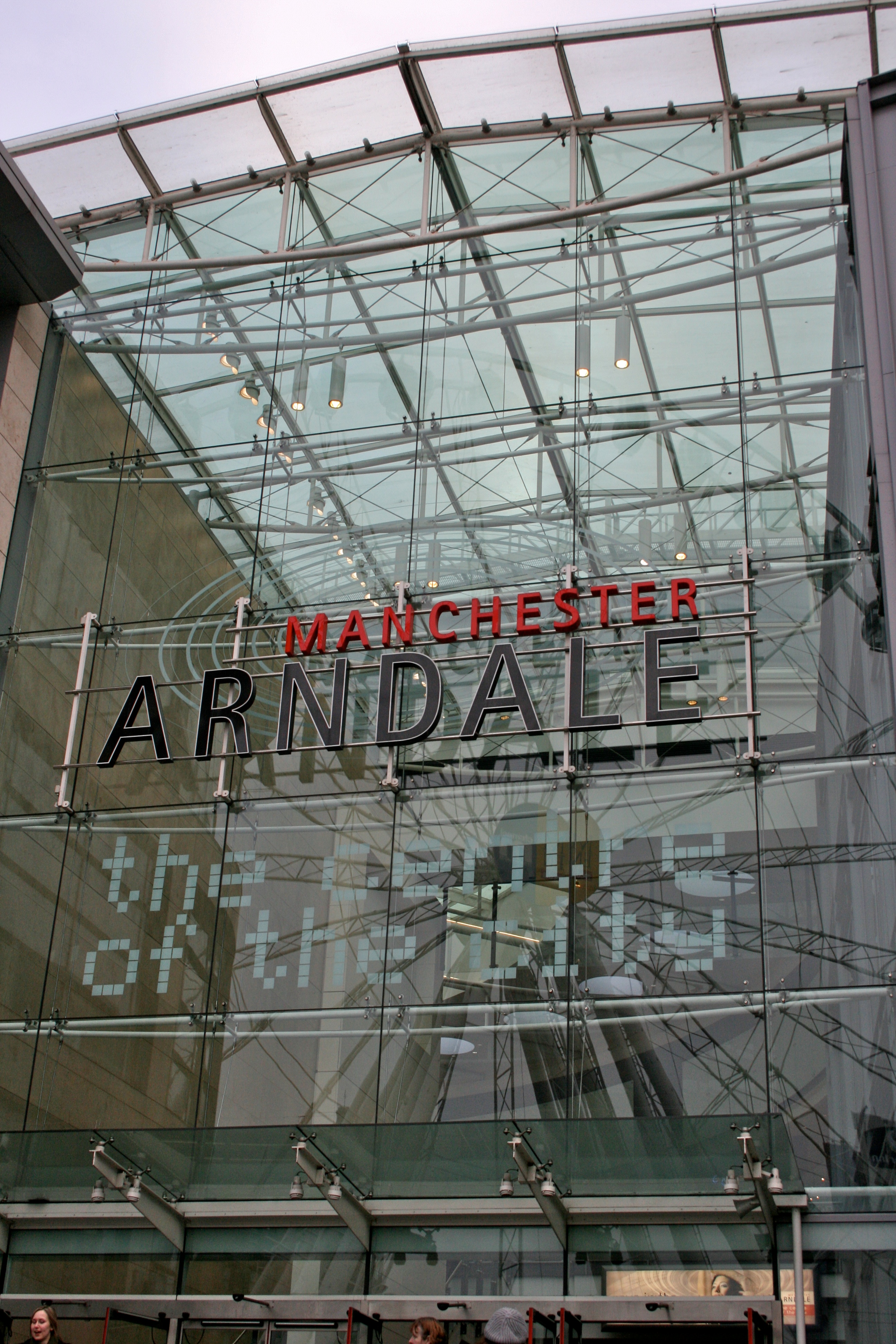
- Main entrance
- Location: Manchester, England
- Coordinates: 53°29′00″N 2°14′29″W
- Opened: 1975; 51 years ago
- Developer: Arndale Property Trust
- Owner: Hammerson (50%); M&G Real Estate (50%)
- Num. of stores: 210
- Num. of anchor tenants: 7
- Floor area: 1,300,000 ft^{2} (120,000 m^{2})
- Floors: 3 (21 in Office Tower)
- Parking: 1450 spaces, NCP (Manchester) Limited.
- Website: manchesterarndale.com

Manchester Arndale is a large shopping centre in Manchester, England. It was constructed in phases between 1972 and 1979, at a cost of £100 million. Manchester Arndale is the largest of the chain of Arndale Centres built across the UK in the 1960s and 1970s. It was redeveloped after the 1996 Manchester bombing.

The centre has a retail floorspace of just under 1,400,000 ft^{2} (130,000 m^{2}) (not including Selfridges and Marks and Spencer department stores to which it is connected via a link bridge), making it Europe's third largest city-centre shopping mall. It is one of the largest shopping centres in the UK, with 41 million visitors annually, ahead of the Trafford Centre, which attracts 35 million.

== History ==
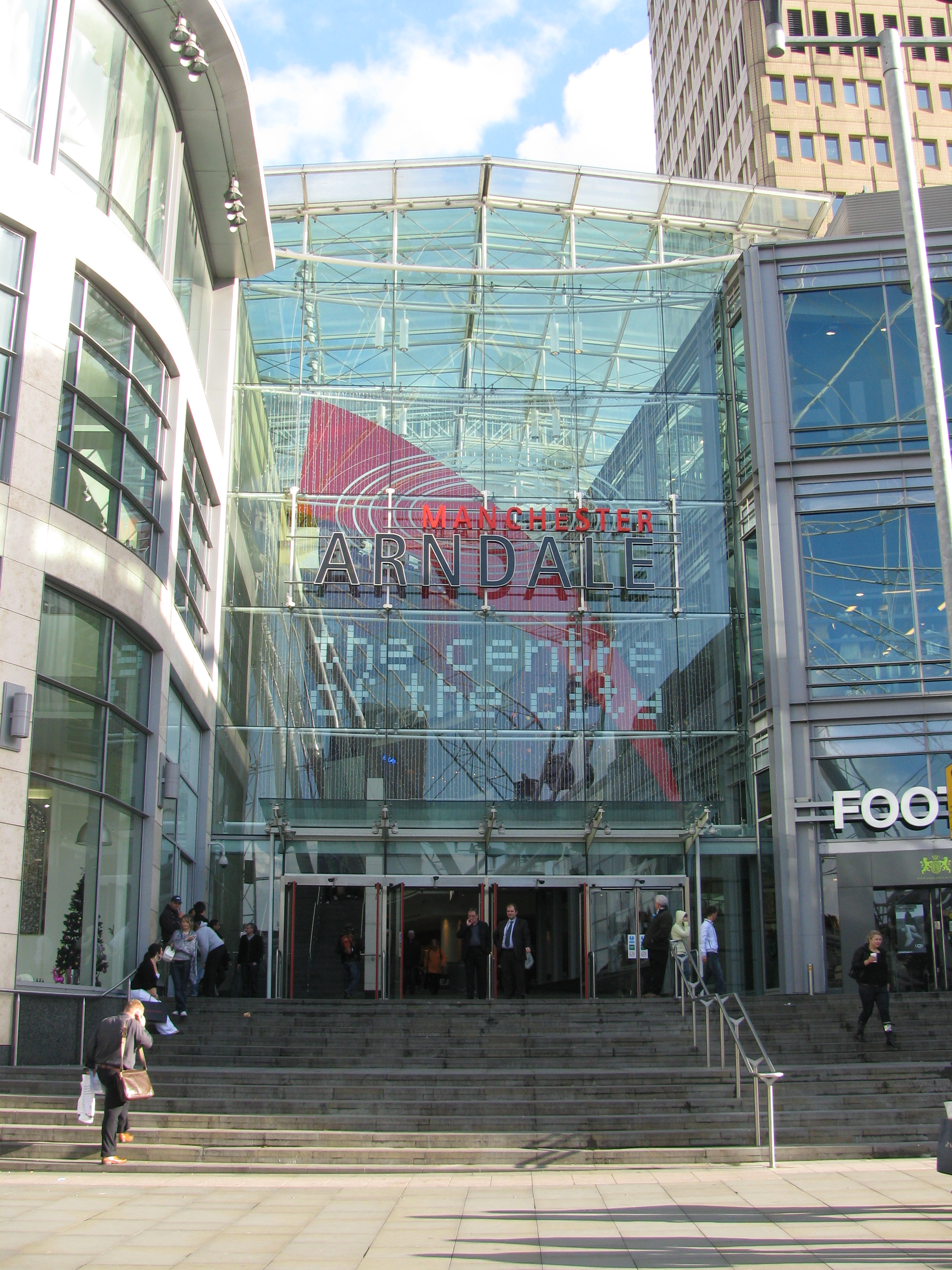
The Arndale from Exchange Square

The Manchester Arndale was built between 1971 and 1979 on Market Street in Manchester city centre by developers Town & City Properties, the successors to the Arndale Property Trust, with financial backing from the Prudential Assurance Company and Manchester Corporation. The first phase opened in 1975. It was the largest Arndale Centre in the United Kingdom.

=== Arndale Property Trust ===
The Arndale Property Trust, formed in the early 1950s, took its name from its founders, Arnold Hagenbach and Sam Chippindale. Hagenbach, a Yorkshireman of Swiss extraction, owned a chain of baker's shops and had invested in retail premises from 1939. Chippindale was an estate agent and former civil servant from Otley. Arndale was unusual, though not unique, amongst property companies in being based outside London and specialising in retail property. Hagenbach invested more and was the quieter partner. Chippindale was blunt and outspoken but was able to persuade sceptical northern councils to accept the company's proposals, where London-based developers could not. Arndale bought property north of Market Street in 1952.

=== Redevelopment plans ===
The city council recognised before the end of the Second World War that the area around Market Street was in need of redevelopment, and a plan was drawn up between 1942 and 1945 but no progress was made. The City Surveyor stated in 1962: "Manchester [is] crystallised in its Victorian setting ... A new look for the city has been long overdue. ... Its unsightly areas of mixed industrial, commercial and residential development need to be systematically unravelled and redeveloped on comprehensive lines. Only in this way can a city assume its proper place as a regional centre." The corporation used compulsory purchase orders to speed redevelopment at the bomb-damaged Market Place (between the Corn Exchange and the Royal Exchange—the development has since been demolished), at the CIS buildings, and at Piccadilly. In the view of the surveyor, "These schemes have greatly improved the appearance of the central area of the City". The corporation's preferred development was a tower above a two or three-storey podium, the form used in all three developments, and later that of the Arndale. Corporation planners added the land and buildings they owned to those acquired by Arndale to increase the size of the available plot.

=== Retail centre ===
Manchester was traditionally the dominant retail centre of the conurbation and region, and Market Street was the main shopping street from about 1850. Manchester's position weakened during the 1960s as the range of goods available elsewhere increased. Salford had concentrated its three main retail areas into one, with the aim of eliminating the need for residents to travel to Manchester to shop. Stockport town centre had been cleared of cotton mills to improve its appearance, and a major through route had been closed to build the Merseyway Shopping Centre, which doubled local retail spend. In quantitative terms, while in 1961 Manchester's retail spend was 3.7 times that of the next biggest shopping area in the conurbation, by 1971 this had fallen to 2.8 times.

In the 1960s and 1970s, the desire to provide modern shopping facilities was prevalent among most councils in major cities, where the Victorian buildings could not accommodate the needs of modern retailers. Other examples from the period include the Bull Ring, Birmingham and the Merrion Centre, Leeds.

=== Plan of 1965 ===
A 1965 version of the scheme, costed at £15 million and bounded by Market Street, Corporation Street, Withy Grove and High Street, was intended to be the UK's biggest single shopping centre. The only change to the boundaries (as of 2009) was in 1973 (i.e. before opening) onto the site of the former Manchester Guardian offices on the opposite side of Market Street. Boots took the 110,000 sq ft (10,000 m^{2}) (gross) extension in its entirety, their biggest store at the time.

=== Town & City Properties ===
Arndale Property Trust was acquired by Town & City Properties in April 1968. A public enquiry into the development started on 18 June 1968, with a submission that the existing street pattern, while historic, was "hopelessly inadequate for modern requirements". The city planning officer gave evidence that "the development would be comparable with the best carried out in North America and Scandinavia". The scheme was to include seven public houses and a 200-bed hotel. An economist gave evidence that spending in central Manchester would double by 1981. The enquiry finished on 8 July 1968 and reported in early November 1969. The inspector approved the scheme, noting that the region north of Market Street needed redeveloping, and it was sensible to redevelop the frontage. Manchester corporation compulsorily purchased a further 8 acres (3 ha) of property in 1970 using money raised by selling land outside the city bought for overspill housing.

=== Pre-1971 streets and buildings ===
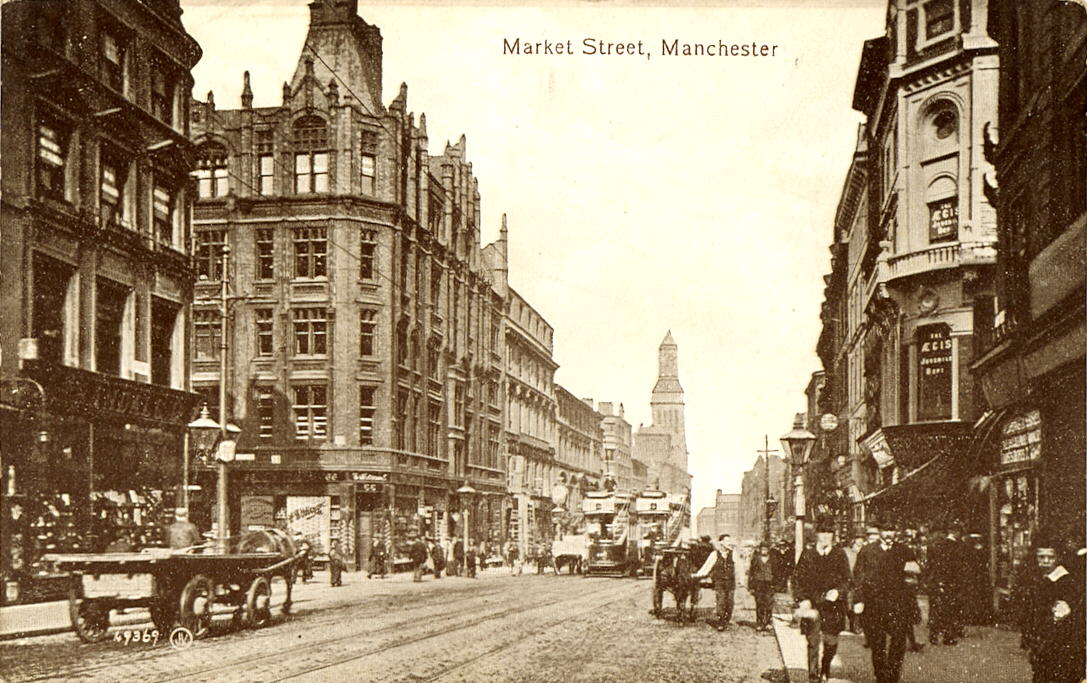
Market Street, looking west (date unknown)

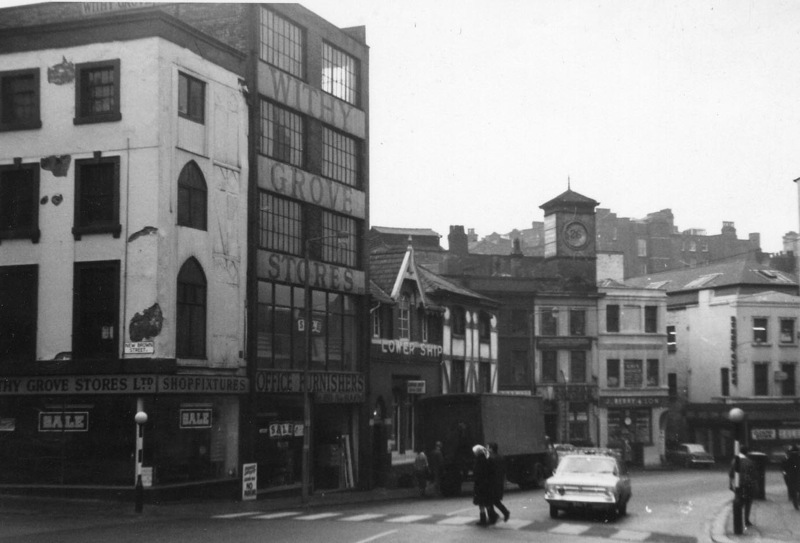
Withy Grove, looking west in 1967 before redevelopment

The area was a patchwork of mostly Victorian buildings on a 17th and 18th century layout of streets, alleys, and courts. A map used for the 1961 meeting of the British Association shows shops fronting Market Street and Cross Street, with warehousing or office buildings behind.

Neither Stewart's The Stones of Manchester (1956) nor Sharp et al.'s survey Manchester Buildings (1966) describe the area or any buildings in particular. Stewart is generally strong on Victorian architecture, and none of its 60 "principal buildings" were within the redevelopment area. Sharp et al. covered older and new buildings; of the many described over fifty are in the city centre but none were in the cleared area. Pevsner, writing in 1969 when clearance was imminent, found nothing of note. H. W. D. Sculthorpe, the town clerk, described the buildings as obsolescent in evidence to the public enquiry. Shop Property predicted in 1971 that as "new buildings replace the existing dilapidated ones" the city centre would lose its Coronation Street image, and become "very attractive" to retailers. The Guardian, which had offices in Cross Street, wrote in 1976 that Market Street had been "depressing and decaying" for 30 years.

Later descriptions are more complimentary. Spring (in 1979) wrote of "monstrosities that have ousted the city's grand heritage of nineteenth century commercial and industrial architecture—if the recently completed mammoth and distinctly lavatorial Arndale Centre is anything to go by". Hamilton (in 2001) wrote that the area reflected Manchester's wealth and leadership in the middle of the 19th century, with buildings designed by leading UK architects. Moran (in 2006) called it a "maze of characterful streets".

In the early 1960s, the area had several establishments that made Manchester, in Lee's description, a rival to Hamburg as the "fun city of Europe". Unlicensed coffee bars where people listened to live and recorded music and which did not serve alcohol were effectively outside police control. A 1965 police report by plain-clothes cadets known as the "mod squad" described them as unsanitary, dimly-lit drug dens, run by "men of colour", where young men were fleeced of their money and young women trapped into prostitution. The Manchester Corporation Act 1965 was passed after the report and closed most of them. The Cinephone Cinema was the first in Manchester to show 'continental' X-rated films, mostly erotica. Second-hand bookstalls and what Lee described as "Manchester's very own Carnaby Street" had opened by the early 1970s. The Seven Stars on Withy Grove was one of Manchester's oldest pubs, with a licence dating back to 1356; Redford claimed it to be "oldest licensed house in Great Britain", though this was probably not the case.

=== Design and construction ===
The area before development

The architects were Hugh Wilson and J. L. Womersley. Their work together included Hulme Crescents and the Manchester Education Precinct. Womersley, as Sheffield City Architect, was responsible for the post-war redevelopment of Sheffield in the 1950s and 1960s including the city centre as well as extensive residential estates, notably Park Hill.

The developers and the corporation did not allow the architects a free hand. The developers demanded a closed building with little natural light and rejected a more open, roof-lit design. The corporation insisted on a bus station, market, car parking, an underground railway station, and provision for deck access to subsequent developments. Cannon Street was to be kept open with no shop frontages. Corporation Street and High Street were allowed shop fronts on the returns to Market Street. Market Street, a busy thoroughfare, had shop fronts as pedestrianisation was proposed, though this did not happen until 1981. Display windows were forbidden on most of the external walls of the centre and were instead inside. The architects, developers, and city council did not communicate well. The architects realised that "the brief [as] given ... would produce a very introverted building. And we said this would not be attractive".

Construction started in 1972 and the centre opened in stages, with the Arndale Tower and 60 shops opening in September 1976, followed by Knightsbridge Mall (the bridge over Market Street) in May 1977, the northern mall in October 1977, the market hall, Boots, and the bridge to the Shambles (over Corporation Street) in 1978, and the bus station off Cannon Street and anchor stores Littlewoods and British Home Stores in 1979. On opening, the centre contained 210 shops and over 200 market stalls.

The cost, estimated at £11½ million in the public enquiry in 1968, rose to £26 million by 1972, and to £30 million by 1974, forcing the formation of Manchester Mortgage Corporation, a partnership of Town & City, the Prudential Assurance Company, and Manchester Corporation. The joint company, run by Manchester Corporation, raised £5 million on the stock market (a first for a company formed by a local authority), after the Prudential admitted it could not fully fund the project. Town & City came close to bankruptcy, forcing them into a reverse takeover of Jeffrey Sterling's Sterling Guarantee Trust in April 1974 and a £25 million rights issue in 1975–6. Costs reached £46 million by 1976, of which £13 million came from the council. The final cost, described as "enormous" by Parkinson-Bailey, was £100 million, made up of £11.5 million for land, £44.5 million for the building, and £44 million for fitting out.

=== Early days ===
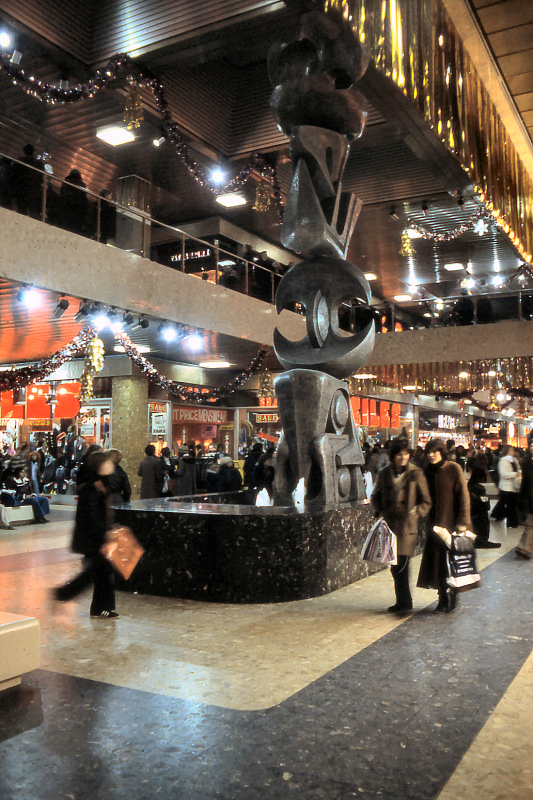
Totem sculpture by Franta Belsky in the Arndale Centre (1977)

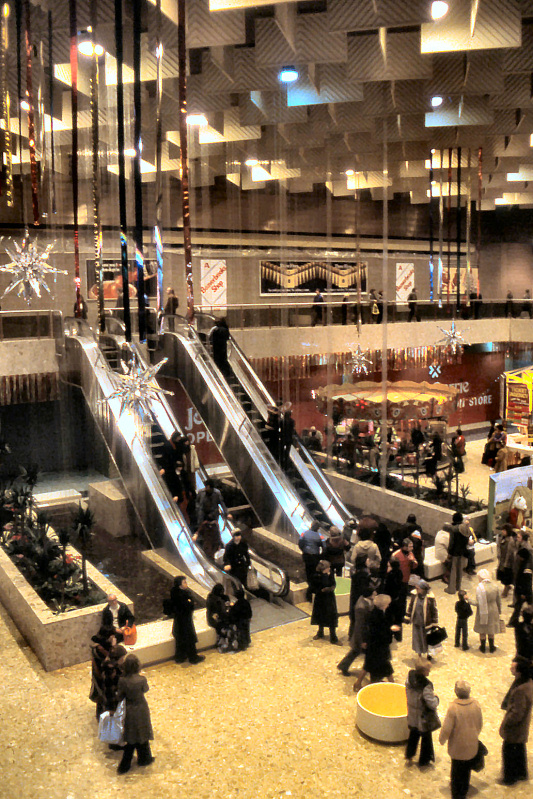
A 1977 photo of the interior of the Arndale

The centre was divided by Market Street and Cannon Street. South of Market Street, on the site of the old Guardian buildings, was a branch of Boots. Market Street was bridged by a mall, Knightsbridge and later Voyager Bridge. The part between Market Street and Cannon Street was mostly two-storey and contained most of the anchor stores and access to the office block. Ground-level entrances were at the upper level from High Street and at the lower level from Corporation Street, taking advantage of a slope of about 24 feet (7 m). A centrally-placed entrance from Market Street entered via a mezzanine into Hallé Square, a full-height open space. These areas remained fundamentally unchanged in 2009. North of Cannon Street, the lower floor was occupied by the bus station, with the upper floor shops, and 60 flats above them. At the High Street end was a two-floor market area. Cannon Street was bridged by a mall at the Corporation Street end and underpassed by a tunnel at the High Street end. There was a continuous pathway around the centre, but not at a single level. At the High Street end a multi-storey car park was sited above the market centre and Cannon Street. In all there were 1,360 yards (1,240 m) of mall. Underneath the centre was a full-circuit full-height service road, 1/2 mile (800 metres) in length, with access from Withy Grove. By taking advantage of the change in height, the architects hoped to solve the problem of persuading shoppers to use the upper shopping area. While the northern part had no anchor stores, the car park and bus station meant that foot traffic passed through the area, avoiding quiet spots.

The interior of the centre originally featured a 9.45-metre-high (31 ft 0 in) sculpture by the Czech artist Franta Belsky entitled Totem. Installed in 1977, it stood on a polished terrazzo plinth in the middle of a fountain. It symbolised the economic history of Manchester and included a representation of a capstan from the Manchester Ship Canal. Belsky originally intended it to function as a water sculpture but this idea was abandoned by the developers. Totem was awarded the Medal of the Royal British Society of Sculptors for 1976. The sculpture was later removed in 1987/88 during refurbishment works and discarded.

The final building was considered excessively large. The Guardian described it in 1978 as "an awful warning against thinking too big in Britain's cities" and "so castle-like in its outer strength that any passing medieval army would automatically besiege it rather than shop in it". The underground railway scheme was abandoned by 1976 and the only deck access was across Corporation Street to another Town & City development in the Shambles. At the official opening, one of its champions, Dame Kathleen Ollerenshaw, Mayor of Manchester, commented, "I didn't think it would look like that when I saw the balsa wood models". The "unrepentant" architects responded that they had provided what they had been asked to provide. Kenneth Stone said in 1978, "We're not responsible for everything in there, but we're not sorry about the decisions we took as opposed to those which were forced upon us." The critics' opinion did not mellow with time, and the centre was described in 1991 as "aggressive externally". The Economist noted in 1996 that it had "long been regarded as one of Europe's ugliest shopping centres. ... the epitome of lousy modern architecture ... [the outside] was hated". The Financial Times in 1997 called it "outstandingly ugly" and in 2000 "one of Britain's least-loved buildings".

The main cause of its poor reception was its external appearance. Most of the centre was covered by pre-cast concrete panels faced with ceramic tiles. The tiles, made by Shaw Hathernware, were a deep buff, variously described as "bile yellow", "putty and chocolate" (some parts were brown) and "vomit-coloured". They inspired the epithet "the longest lavatory wall in Europe" and variations. According to The Guardian, the description was coined by Norman Shrapnel, the paper's political columnist.

=== Consequences ===
"If there is some street or old shop in the market square, dock factory or warehouse, barn or garden wall which you have passed often and take for granted, do not expect to see it there next week. Because it is not listed, because it is of 'no historical interest' the bulldozers will be in and part of your background will be gone forever"

— John Betjeman in The Rape of Britain

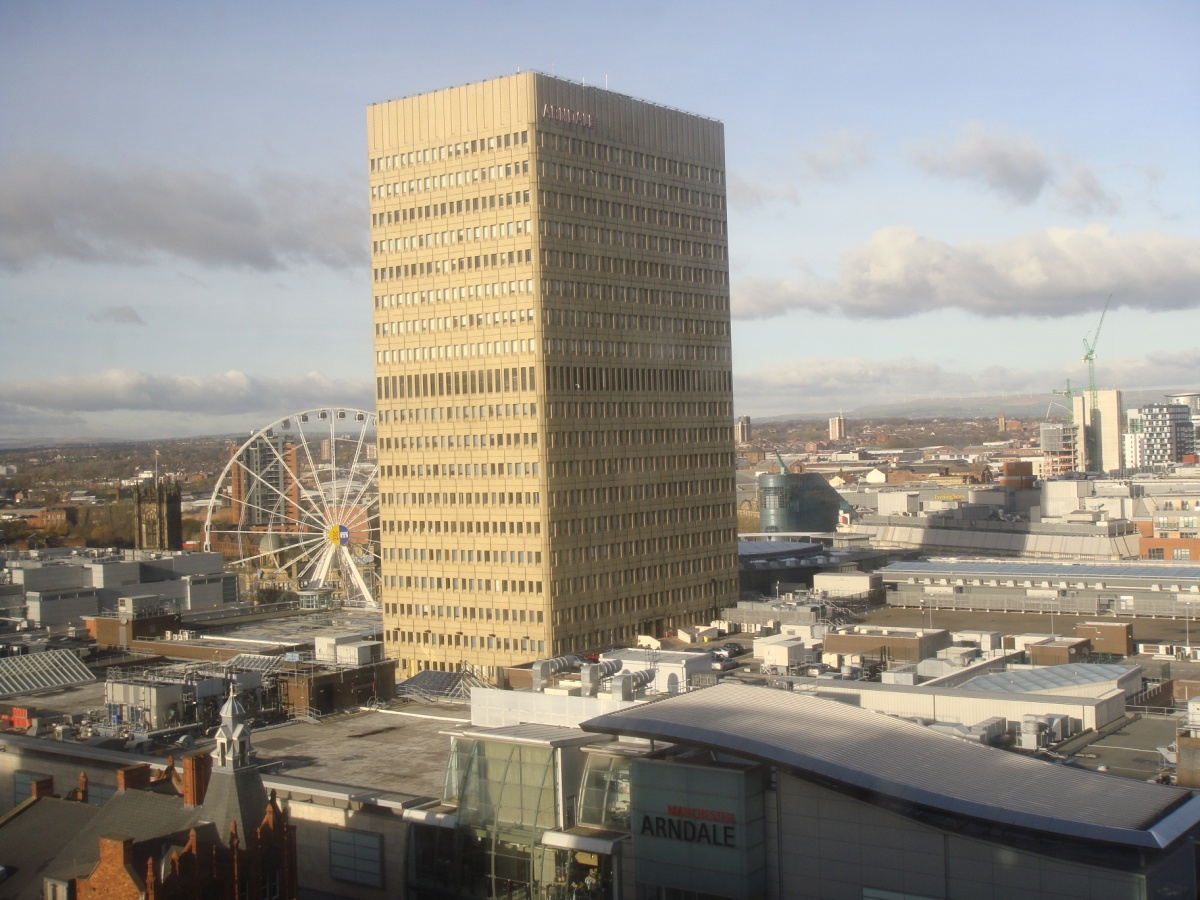
The original yellow Arndale Tower, which remains part of the new Arndale complex

A backlash against comprehensive development was underway before the centre opened. Amery and Dan Cruickshank's The Rape of Britain, with a foreword by John Betjeman, was published to mark European Architectural Heritage Year in 1975. The book describes the redevelopment of about 20 towns under the heading "scenes of rape" and uses the Arndale as an example of "brutal obliteration" undertaken by "the mind that seriously believes that the centre of Manchester should look like a futuristic vision or a barbaric new city borrowed from Le Corbusier". In the same year the pressure group Save Britain's Heritage was formed, in part to discourage the wholesale demolition of unremarkable industrial buildings in the north of England. Several factors, including the property slump of 1974–6, changes to local government in 1974, and changes in the law after the Poulson affair, in which developers corrupted politicians to expedite schemes against the wider public interest, acted against further developments of the size and type of the Arndale. Built Environment commented that while Arndales are "an asset to any town", this scheme "smacks of opportunism beyond the general interest of the city as a whole".

The presence of over one million square feet (90,000 square metres) of retail space distorted shopping patterns in Manchester city centre and many established retailers and retail districts struggled to adapt. Oldham Street lost large stores from their long-term sites and it was clear the area would suffer. Closures of shops and former textile warehouses comparable to those cleared for the Arndale meant the area quickly became run-down and in Bennison et al.'s eyes "almost fossilised". The area remained run down until it was revitalised as the Northern Quarter in the late 1990s. Piccadilly Plaza, completed in 1966, lost trade when the Arndale opened and was put up for sale for £10 m in the middle of 1979; as a shopping centre, it never recovered.

Stocks argues that these factors lay behind the Greater Manchester County Council's strategic view that the county had too much retail capacity. From 1977 onwards the GMC consistently opposed further development, and would not support any before 1986. Trade increased in the early 1980s, though GMC policy against development and for retaining the relative importance of the retail centres remained. By the mid-1980s, the trend in retailing had moved from city centres to out-of-town.

The GMC was abolished in 1986 and, in Stocks' terms, "applications for major shopping schemes began to slop over the unmanned dam". A consequence of pent-up applications was that the adjacent newly created authorities of Salford and Trafford found themselves in a "prisoner's dilemma" over competing out-of-town schemes, at Barton Locks and Dumplington, broadly similar in size to the Arndale. By 1989, planning applications for almost five million square feet (460,000 square metres) of retail space in Greater Manchester were unresolved. A public enquiry (followed by action in the appeal court, and a case in the House of Lords) approved the Dumplington proposal (the Trafford Centre). Construction began in 1996.

=== Refurbishment ===
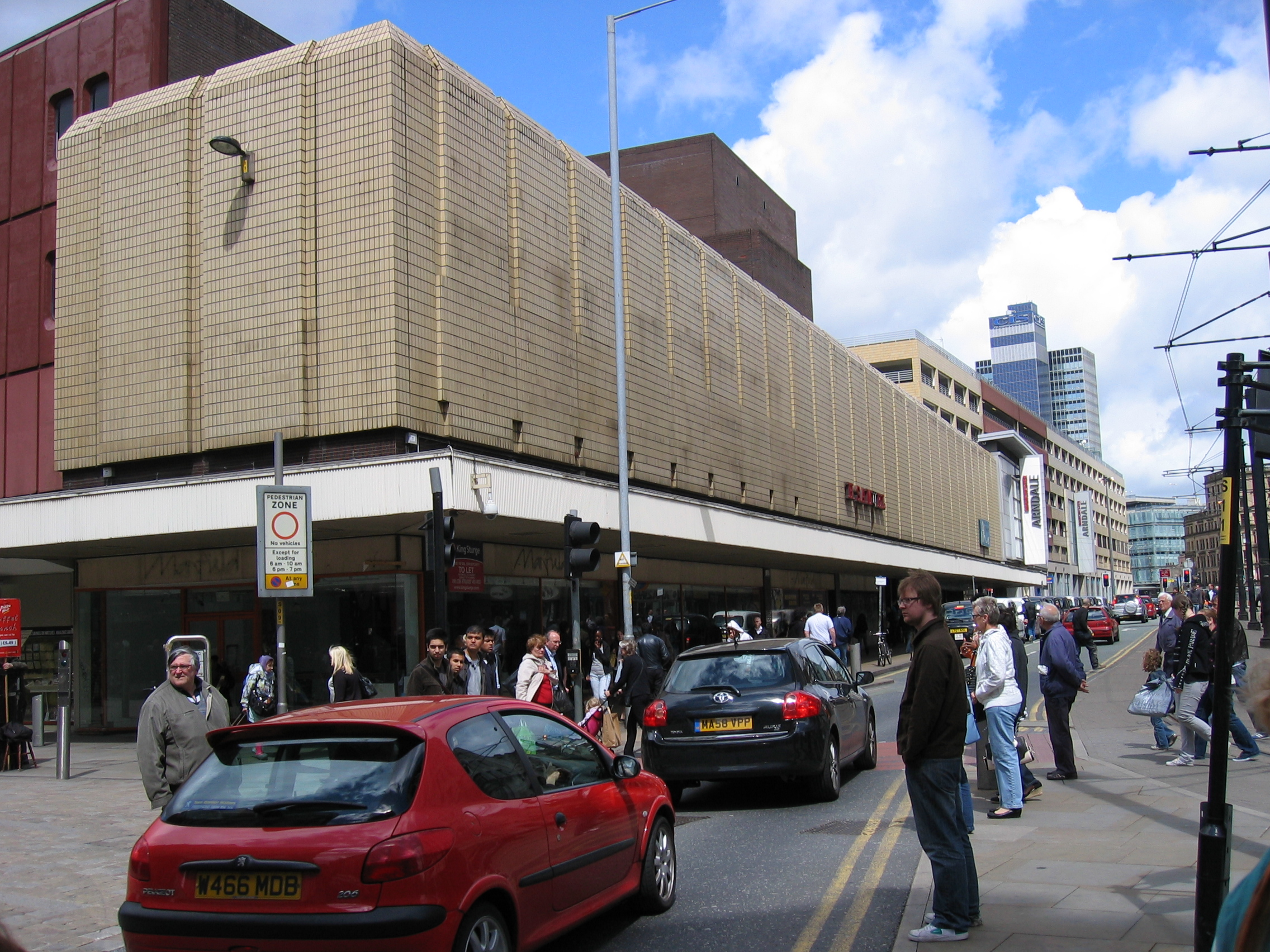
The High Street in 2009. The original yellow tiles remain.

The typical life span of a shopping centre is about 10–20 years, at which point the owners may do nothing, refurbish or demolish. In the Arndale, refurbishment began about six years after opening. Artificial lighting and undistinguishable malls, with multiple dead ends and no obvious circular route, meant that shoppers were, in Morris's words, "bewildered by its maze-like intensity". Parkinson-Bailey described the centre as "never the pleasantest place to shop in ... hot and stuffy". Criticisms were addressed in a half-million pound upgrade in which roof lights were inserted to allow in daylight and pot-plants introduced. To improve navigation and to tone down the appearance, the flooring of each area was given a distinct colour scheme, decorative ironwork was installed, and a fountain was placed at one corner and a double-floor height aviary placed at another. The Arndale's own radio station, Centre Sound, was installed. Hallé Square housed a food court by day and could be used as a concert area by night if required. Beddington describes the results as "workmanlike but unromantic".

Town & City changed its name to Sterling Guarantee Trust in 1983, and in February 1985 merged with the Peninsular and Oriental Steam Navigation Company (known as P & O), also run by Jeffrey Sterling. P & O decided to refurbish Knightsbridge (the bridge over Market Street) and double the rents. Work took place in 1990–1, and the most visible change was a £9 m food court (Voyagers) in an area not previously open to the public. The refurbishment was a success and increased the centre's popularity. Other refurbishments took place in 1991–3, despite opposition from traders who objected to changes that might take the centre 'up-market'. The northern part of the centre saw little investment for years, and the market hall was seen as ripe for improvement.

The bus station became Manchester's busiest, handling 30,000 passengers and 1,500 bus movements per day by 1991. It was unpopular with travellers, especially women. Described as "dirty and horrible", its poorly lit interior was identified by Taylor as inherently threatening and a "landscape of fear".

Behold the ingenuities of civic pride: ugly we may be, but our ugly's bigger than yours.

— Howard Jacobson

As a shopping centre Manchester Arndale was outstandingly successful, and the critics' opinions were not universally held – especially by its owners. By 1996 the Arndale was fully let, raised £20 m a year in rents, was the seventh busiest shopping area in the UK in terms of sales, and was visited by 750,000 people a week. The poet Lemn Sissay wrote

The Arndale Centre was always just the Arndale Centre. A palace of Perspex and people. A light extravaganza. ... a shopper's heaven on earth. In all its gargantuan glory I love it. Whether it is ugly or not is a purely subjective opinion. It is wonderful inside."

=== 1996 IRA bombing ===
The Corporation Street frontage of the Arndale after the 1996 bomb. The van was parked just beyond the footbridge, on the left side of the road.

The centre became a target for terrorists. Arson attacks in April 1991 were followed by firebombs in December 1991 which caused extensive damage to four stores. The Provisional Irish Republican Army (IRA) was blamed for the incidents, in which the devices were placed in soft furnishings during shopping hours. After the second attack, Christmas shopping continued much as normal the following day in the unaffected stores. An unnamed fireman noted, "What bugs me is if there's a big one planted there's a lot of glass around here, and a lot of people will be killed".

At about 09:20 on Saturday morning, 15 June 1996, two men parked a 7 1/2-long-ton (7.6-tonne) lorry containing a 1,500 kg (3,300 lb) bomb on Corporation Street between Marks & Spencer and the Arndale. At about 09:45, a coded warning was received by Granada TV. The usual weekend population of shoppers was supplemented by football fans in town for the Russia v Germany match of UEFA Euro 1996, due to be staged on Sunday at Old Trafford. About 80,000 people were cleared from the area by police and store staff using procedures developed after an IRA bombing incident in 1992, assisted by outside staff experienced in crowd control drafted in to help with the football fans. The bomb exploded at 11:17, shortly after the army bomb squad arrived from Liverpool and began making it safe. Nobody was killed, but over 200 people were injured, some seriously, mostly by flying glass, though one pregnant shopper was thrown in the air by the blast.

In all 1200 properties on 43 streets were affected. Marks and Spencer's and the adjacent Longridge House were condemned as unsafe within days, and were demolished. The Arndale's frontage on Corporation Street and the footbridge were structurally damaged. The reinsurance company Swiss Re estimated that the final insurance payout was over £400 m, making it at the time the most expensive man-made disaster ever.

=== Redevelopment ===
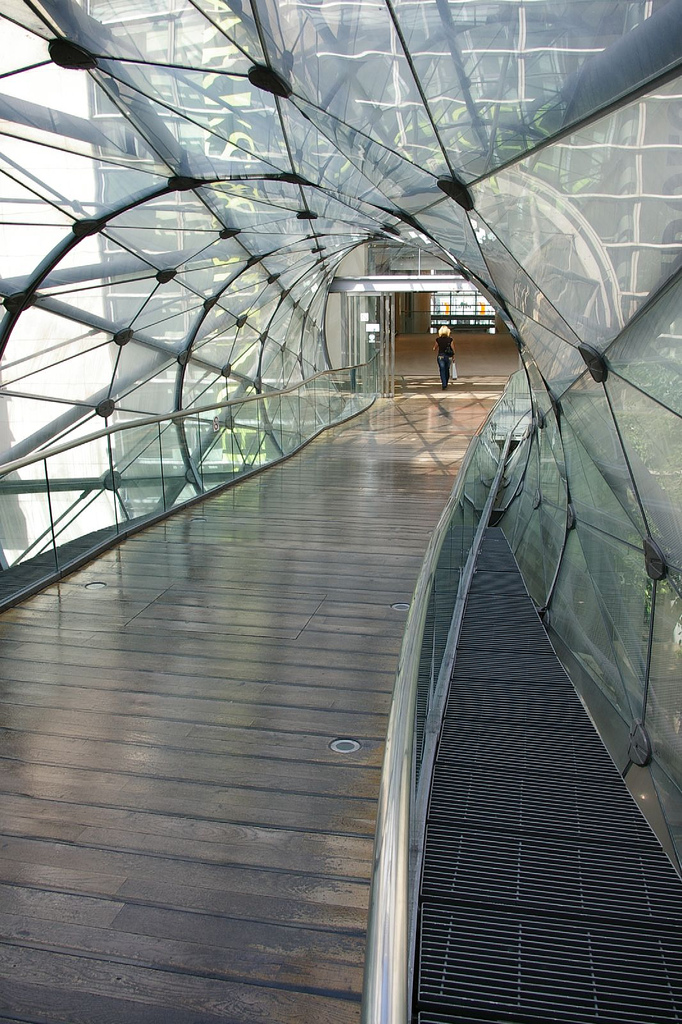
Interior of the footbridge linking the Arndale to Marks & Spencer across Corporation Street

In the immediate aftermath of the bombing, the southern half of the centre was repaired and refurbished. The northern half was patched up, with buses originally stopping on Cannon Street itself before the bus station was eventually replaced by Shudehill Interchange in January 2006. Marks and Spencer, which was particularly badly damaged in the explosion, reopened in a separate building, linked to the main mall on the first floor by a glass footbridge which was designed by Stephen Hodder. Shortly after opening the large branch, the building was split into two independent shops. Half remained a branch of Marks and Spencer while the side facing The Triangle became a branch of Selfridges.

In autumn 2003, as the final stage of rebuilding the city centre after the bombing, the whole of the half of the centre north of Cannon Street was closed and demolished. Over the next two to three years, the northern half of the centre was completely rebuilt and extended. The first phase of the "northern extension", known as 'Exchange Court', opened on 20 October 2005. Exchange Court features Britain's flagship and the world's largest Next store. This was followed by the second phase, known as 'New Cannon Street', which opened on 6 April 2006. Stores in this phase include a new flagship branch of TopShop and Topman.

On 7 September 2006, the third and final phase of the northern extension opened. The new Winter Garden features stores such as a new Superdry (formerly HMV, Zavvi & Virgin Megastores), a Waterstone's bookshop, and a new single-level unit for the Arndale Market. The completed mall provides a link from Exchange Square and The Triangle to the Northern Quarter, and from Market Street to The Printworks.

The southern half of the centre was also refurbished. Halle Square was modernised, including new skylights, but there is still a major difference in levels of natural light between the original malls and the northern extension, where the designers sought to maximise it.

=== Recent developments ===
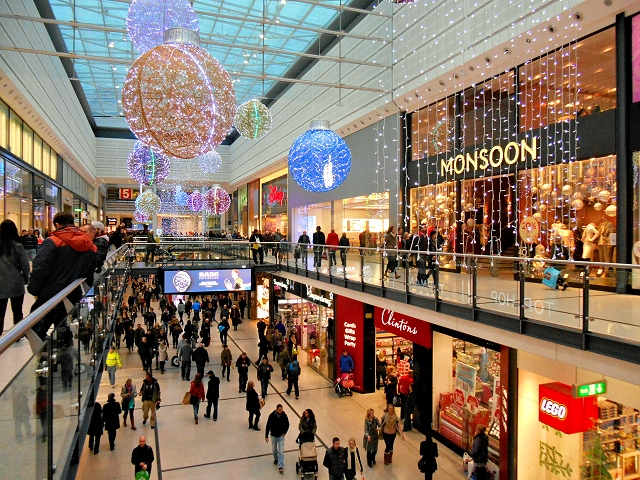
The most recent extension to the Arndale, which opened in 2006

By the late 1990s, the centre was no longer owned by the Arndale Property Trust. In the early 21st century the centre was jointly owned by M&G Real Estate and Intu Group until June 2020, when the bankrupt Intu went into administration.

With the large-scale redevelopment of the centre since the 1996 bombing, it has a retail floorspace of 1,300,000 ft^{2} (120,000 m^{2}), making it Europe's largest city-centre shopping mall, a record it has held continuously since construction apart from a brief spell during the northern redevelopment when the title was held by the Birmingham Bullring.

As part of the renovation, most of the tiles have been removed and replaced by sandstone and glass cladding. Manchester Arndale houses the largest Next store, with the largest glass store frontage in the UK, and also the largest Office Shoe store outside London as of April 2010.

In August 2015 the Arndale announced the launch of its first-ever Charity Star initiative, with the centre fundraising for a chosen charity for one whole year.

In around 2021, the last part of the original Arndale and the adjacent Aleef News, was refurbished, to make way for two tenants, Sports Direct and Tim Hortons. The yellow tiles remain untouched.

In July 2026, Hammerson acquired a 50% stake in the centre.

== Food court ==
Like many large shopping malls, Manchester Arndale has a food court. The Food-Chain, opened as Voyagers in 1991, is an 800-seat food court situated on the second floor above the far south-west tip of the centre. It can be reached by an escalator encased in glass from Market Street, by a lift accessed from the outside of Boots, and from the first floor at the south-western tip of the centre close to Argos and the first-floor entrance to Boots.

== Transport ==
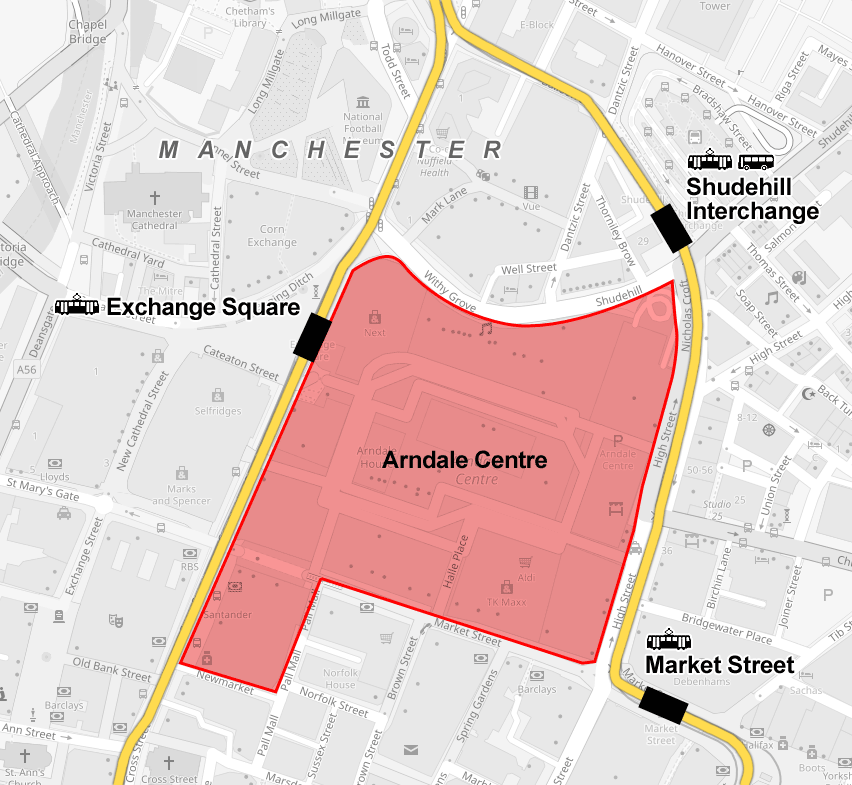
Map of Metrolink tram stops near the Manchester Arndale

In the 1970s, plans to construct an underground railway station appeared in the Picc-Vic tunnel scheme. Royal Exchange station was planned to be built underneath Cross Street to serve both the Arndale and the Royal Exchange. The scheme was cancelled but a subterranean void was constructed beneath the centre to enable the future addition of an underground station.

Today the Manchester Arndale is served by three stations on the Manchester Metrolink tram system, Market Street, Exchange Square and Shudehill Interchange, which is also a bus station.

== See also ==
- Lists of shopping malls
- Trafford Centre — Manchester's out of town shopping centre in nearby Urmston, Trafford
