= Harry Crosbie =

Irish property developer and music venue operator

OBE Harry Crosbie
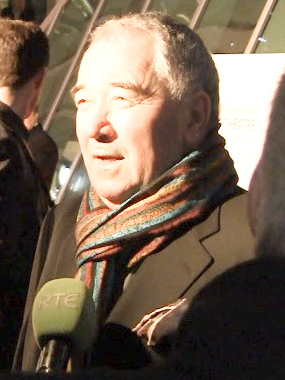
- Crosbie at the opening night of his Grand Canal Theatre on 18 March 2010
- Born: 1945 or 1946 (age 80–81); Dublin, Ireland
- Occupation: Property developer

Harry Crosbie (born 1945 or 1946) is an Irish property developer and entrepreneur from the Dublin suburb of Drumcondra. He is known for his work in redeveloping the Dublin Docklands, and his association with arts and events venues in Dublin city, including the Convention Centre, Vicar Street, The Point Depot/3Arena and the Grand Canal Theatre, as well as the Point Village, and the Wheel of Dublin ferris wheel.

== Early life ==
Crosbie grew up on Clonliffe Road in Drumcondra. His father came from East Wall in the Dublin Docklands, where he later ran a haulage business and acquired a large landbank beside Dublin Port. He was educated at the private boarding school Rockwell College.

== Developments ==
=== The Point Theatre and O2 ===
Crosbie bought the closed CIE Points Works in Dublin's Docklands depot for 750,000 Irish pounds in 1988, and redeveloped it into the Point Theatre, later expanded as the Point Depot, and then the O2, now known as the 3Arena, Ireland's biggest music and event venue. NAMA made Crosbie sell his 50% share of the O2 (to the co-owner of the O2 Live Nation) for €35 million in 2012.

=== Kittiwake ===
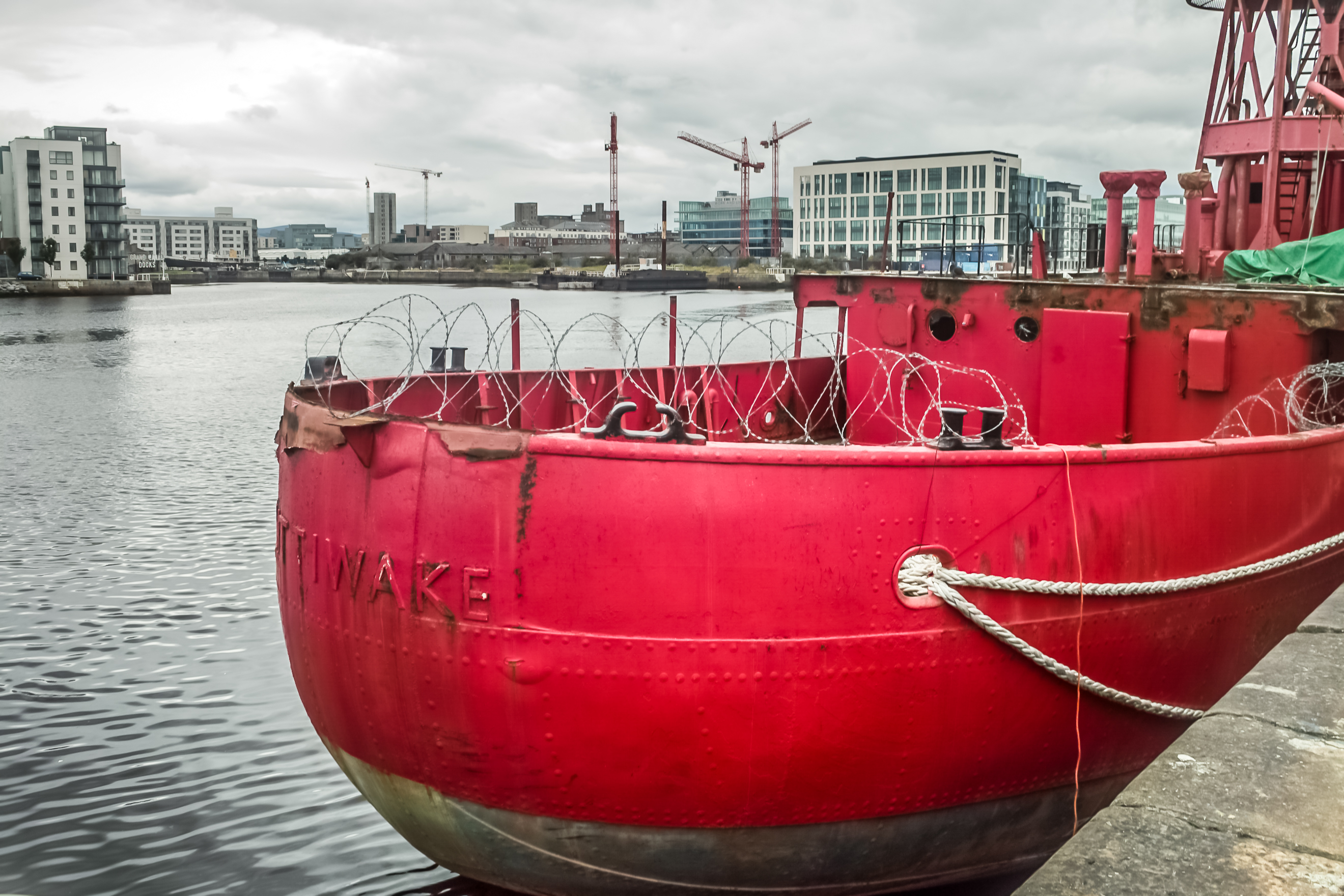
The Kittiwake in February 2009

In 2007, Crosbie purchased from the Commissioners of Irish Lights the Kittiwake, a 1950s 40-metre light ship, built by Philip and Son in Dartmouth, Devon. It was the second-last lightship to serve in Irish waters, ending service in 2005. He had plans to lift it from the Liffey onto the quayside but was unable to reach agreement on a dry land location with the local authority. He had work done on the ship anyway, removing engines and asbestos, with a view to opening a cafe inside it, and stated that over half a million euro had been spent on the project. The port authority, the Dublin Port Company, said that they had purchased the boat from the National Asset Management Agency (NAMA) in 2012, and lifted it from the Alexandra Basin West, in December 2022, for future display in a heritage area on the Alexandra Road. Crosbie disputed both the purported sale and the move, and threatened legal action.

=== Bord Gáis Energy Theatre ===
The Dublin Docklands Development Authority & Joe O'Reilly built a large theatre on the Grand Canal Docks south of the Point, commissioning Daniel Libeskind to design it. Later known as the Bord Gáis Energy Theatre. On completion Crosbie bought the theatre for €10 million. It opened in March 2010. In 2013 NAMA appointed a receiver to the theatre and sold it for €30 million to Crownway Investments in 2014.

=== The Point Village and later developments ===
Crosbie planned a multi-element development north of the Point Theatre, to include a hotel (now the Gibson), a shopping centre, apartments, office space, the 39-storey "Watchtower" which was to be the tallest building in Ireland, a "U2 Experience", a ferris wheel and a sculpture. At one point, he had budgetary plans for investment of about 850 million euro in this. As Crosbie was unable to repay his €430 million debt to NAMA, NAMA appointed receivers to all of Crosbie's assets.

In 2017, NAMA sold the Gibson Hotel in the Point Village to Deka Immobilien for €87 million and in 2022 The Point Village was sold by NAMA for €85 million.

== Recognition ==
In 2012, Crosbie was awarded an honorary OBE, being invested by the British Ambassador to Ireland in Glencairn House, in recognition of services to Anglo-Irish cultural relations and for organising an event during the state visit by Elizabeth II to Ireland in 2011.

== Personal life ==
Crosbie is married for the second time, his first wife, with whom he had three children (Claire, Alison and Simon) having died. He has eight grandchildren/> He moved from a large house on Shrewsbury Road to a converted warehouse on Hanover Quay in the Docklands. He published a book of short stories in 2021.

== Publications ==
- Crosbie, Harry (October 2022). Undernose Farm Revisited. Dublin: Lilliput Press. ISBN 978-1843518150.
