= New Cathedral Street =

Retail street in Manchester, England

Coordinates: 53°29′02″N 2°14′40.50″W

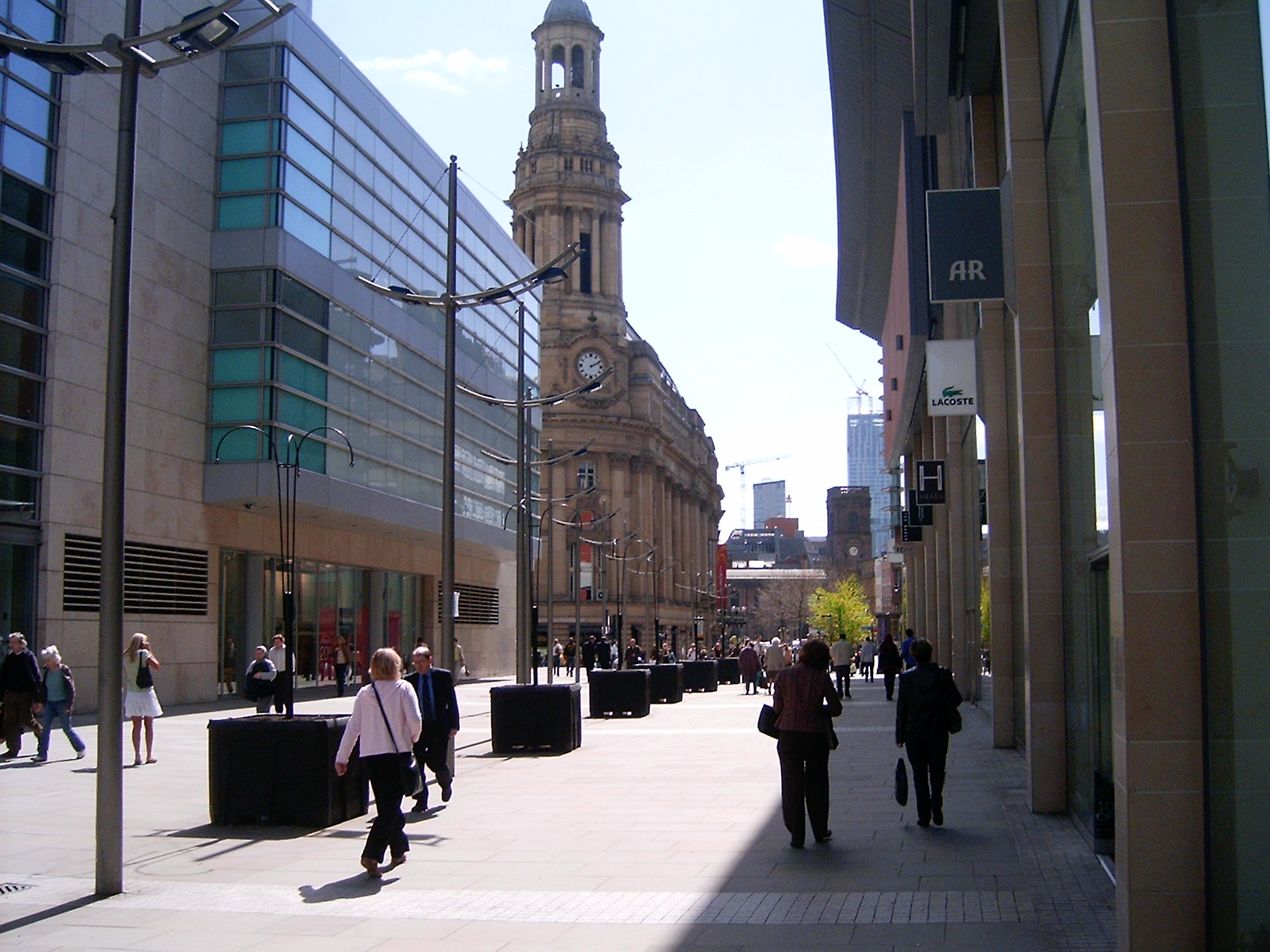
New Cathedral Street, with the Royal Exchange (centre), looking south towards St Ann's Church (behind tree)

New Cathedral Street is a pedestrianised retail street in Manchester city centre, England. It runs between Exchange Square and Exchange Street (off St Mary's Gate). The street is home to the Manchester branch of Marks and Spencer and Selfridges (east side), and Harvey Nichols, the largest Ted Baker and Hugo Boss stores outside London, Lacoste, Louis Vuitton, Reiss, Henri Lloyd, Massimo, Zara and Burberry (west side).

The street and buildings that stand today were all built as part of the rebuilding since the 1996 IRA bombing of the city centre. The block of buildings to the west are on the site of the former Victoria Street and Victoria Buildings which were aligned differently.

Cathedral Street is an older street to the east of Manchester Cathedral and further to the north.

== Sources ==
- Hartwell, Clare (2001) Manchester. (Pevsner Architectural Guides.) New Haven: Yale U. P. ISBN 0-300-09666-6
