= Exchange Square, Manchester =

Civic square in Manchester, England

Exchange Square
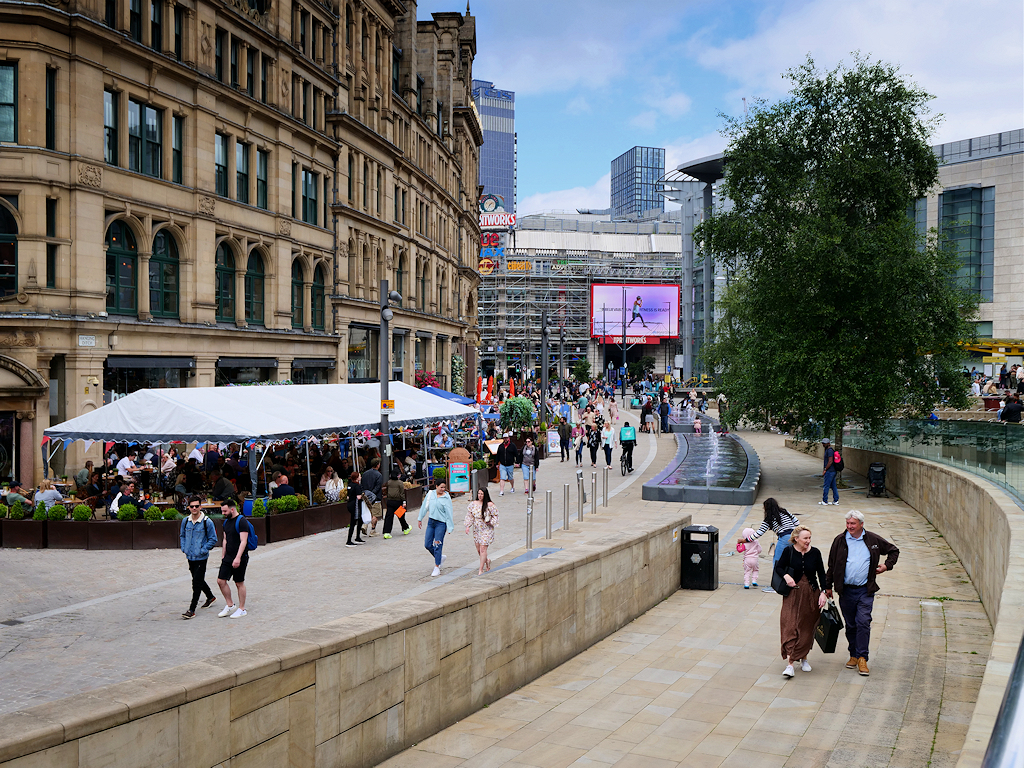
- Interactive map of Exchange Square
- Maintained by: City of Manchester
- Location: Manchester, England, United Kingdom
- Coordinates: 53°29′04″N 2°14′35″W

Construction
- Completion: 1996; 30 years ago

Exchange Square is a civic square in Manchester, England. The square was created after the 1996 Manchester bombing by the IRA. This reconstruction included the structural relocation of two pubs to make room for the new Marks & Spencer store.

Today the square is a major shopping area including branches of high-end department stores Selfridges and Harvey Nichols, New Cathedral Street, the Corn Exchange and an entrance to the Manchester Arndale, one of the most-visited shopping centres in the United Kingdom.

To the north lies the Printworks and Urbis, now home to the National Football Museum. To the west lies Shambles Square (with The Old Wellington Inn) and Manchester Cathedral. To the south is New Cathedral Street and the Royal Exchange.

== Transport ==
The square is served by Exchange Square tram stop on the Manchester Metrolink network which opened in December 2015. The station provides a direct link to Oldham, Shaw & Crompton and Rochdale. Construction on the extension started in 2014 and the entire Second City Crossing scheme was opened on 26 February 2017.

== Wheel of Manchester ==
A transportable Ferris wheel was first installed at Exchange Square in 2004, known as the Wheel of Manchester. This was dismantled and a second wheel was erected in May 2007. The most recently installed wheel, operated by Great City Attractions, had 42 passenger cars and was 60 metres (200 ft) tall. A 91.4-metre (300 ft) wheel was planned for 2008 but never constructed. In 2010, Manchester City Council proposed a 120 m (394 ft) wheel, to be operated by Great City Attractions, as a replacement for the existing transportable installation, which was installed at Piccadilly Gardens until 2015.
