= Exchange Square (Johannesburg) =

- Interactive map of the Exchange Square area
- Alternative names: old mutual

General information
- Type: skyscraper
- Architectural style: modernism
- Location: 69 President Street, Johannesburg, South Africa
- Coordinates: 26.2037°S 28.03988°E
- Completed: 1975

Height
- Height: 406 ft (124 m)

Technical details
- Floor count: 29

Exchange Square (also known as Old Mutual) is a skyscraper at 69 President Street in the Central Business District of Johannesburg, South Africa. It was built in 1975 and is 29 storeys (406.80 ft.) tall. Its structure is made of concrete while its facade is constructed from ceramic tiles. The building is colored brown and is made in a modernistic style. It is mainly used as a commercial office building.
