= Wheels Entertainments =

Wheels Entertainments, sometimes referred to by the press as Wheels Entertainment, is a company engaged in the operation of large transportable Ferris wheels. Based at Shenstone, in Lichfield, Staffordshire, it is the UK operations arm of Dubai-based Freij Entertainment International.

== History ==
In January 2013 The Press and others reported that the British-based Ferris wheels previously operated by Great City Attractions Global, which included wheels installed in Glasgow, Liverpool, Manchester, Plymouth, and York, had been purchased for an undisclosed sum by Freij Entertainment International, the world's biggest fun fair company, and would be operated by Staffordshire-based Wheels Entertainments.

== Ferris wheel installations ==
In May 2013 the Blackpool Gazette reported that agents submitting a planning application on behalf of Wheels Entertainments to Blackpool Council had stated that "the applicants currently have wheels in York, Liverpool and Plymouth but they have also operated successfully elsewhere including in Brighton, Weston-Super-Mare and in the city centres of Manchester, Birmingham, Glasgow, Sheffield and Derby", however this list includes wheels previously operated by Great City Attractions and which had ceased operating at the time of the purchase of Great City Attractions' assets by Freij Entertainment International.

=== Blackpool ===
In May 2013 Wheels Entertainments applied to Blackpool Council for a five-year planning permission for a 60-metre (197 ft) wheel with 42 passenger capsules to be installed on the headland just north of Blackpool's South Pier.

=== Plymouth ===
The Wheel of Plymouth first opened in 2011 and is 53 metres (174 ft) tall. It is open daily from 10am until 7pm.

In March 2013 the Western Morning News reported that Wheels Entertainments had applied for an extension to its planning permission, first granted in October 2011 and then renewed until the end of 2012, to enable the wheel to remain in place until 28 February 2014. The application was approved, with the proviso that the wheel not operate during remembrance events such as Armistice Day and Remembrance Sunday.

=== York ===
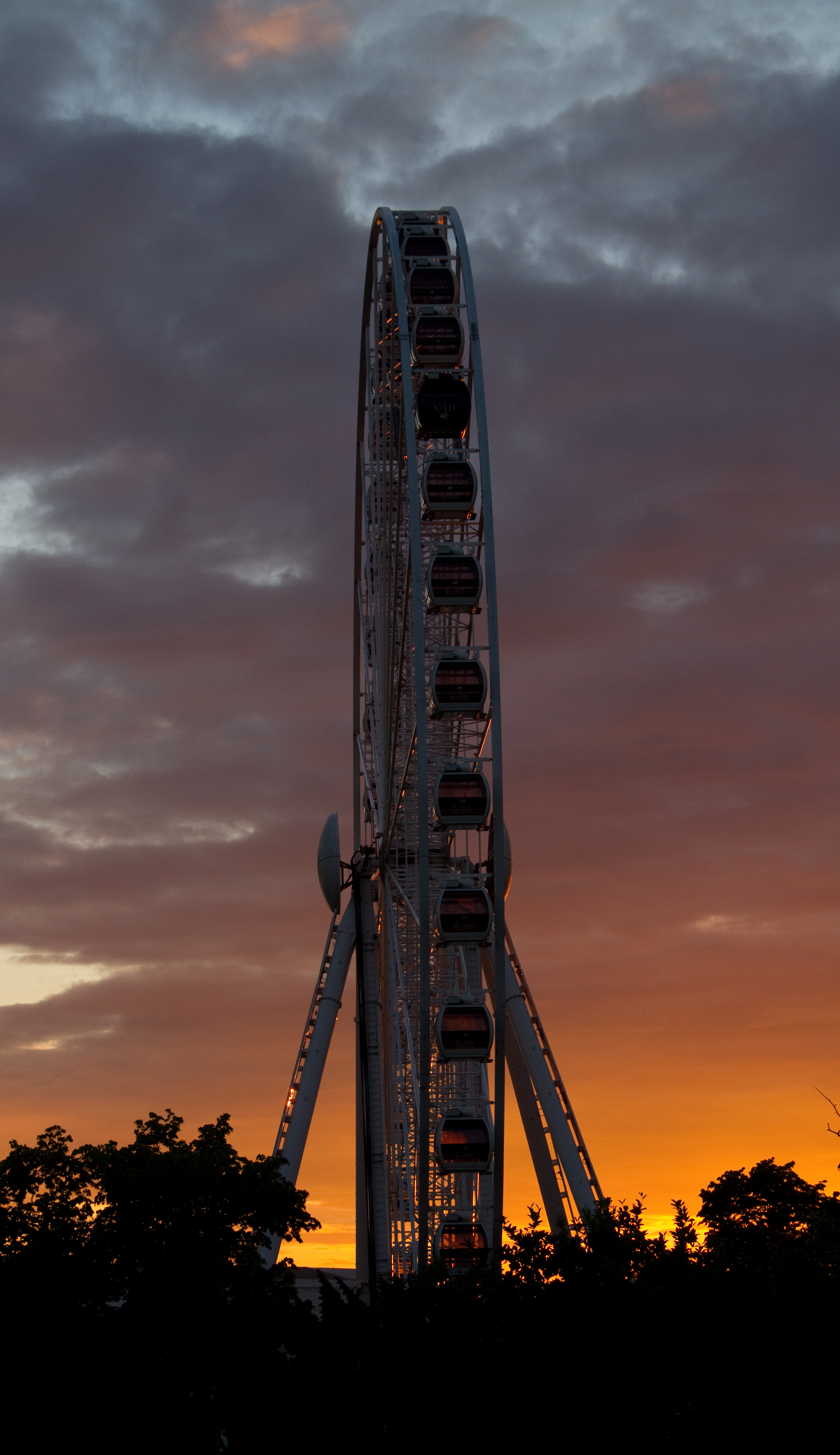
Yorkshire Wheel, 2012

Coordinates: 53.9591°N 1.0914°W

The second Yorkshire Wheel, also known as the Wheel of York or York Wheel, had 42 passenger capsules, including one luxury VIP capsule with glass floor, leather interior and DVD player. It was open from 10 am until 9 pm on weekdays, 9 am to 9 pm on Saturdays, and 10 am to 8 pm on Sundays. The 53.3-metre (175 ft) tall wheel was located in the gardens of The Royal York Hotel and operated from 13 December 2011 until 30 September 2013

Its predecessor was a 54-metre (177 ft) wheel that operated at the National Railway Museum from 12 April 2006 until 2 November 2008.
