= Yorkshire Wheel =

Ferris wheels in York, England

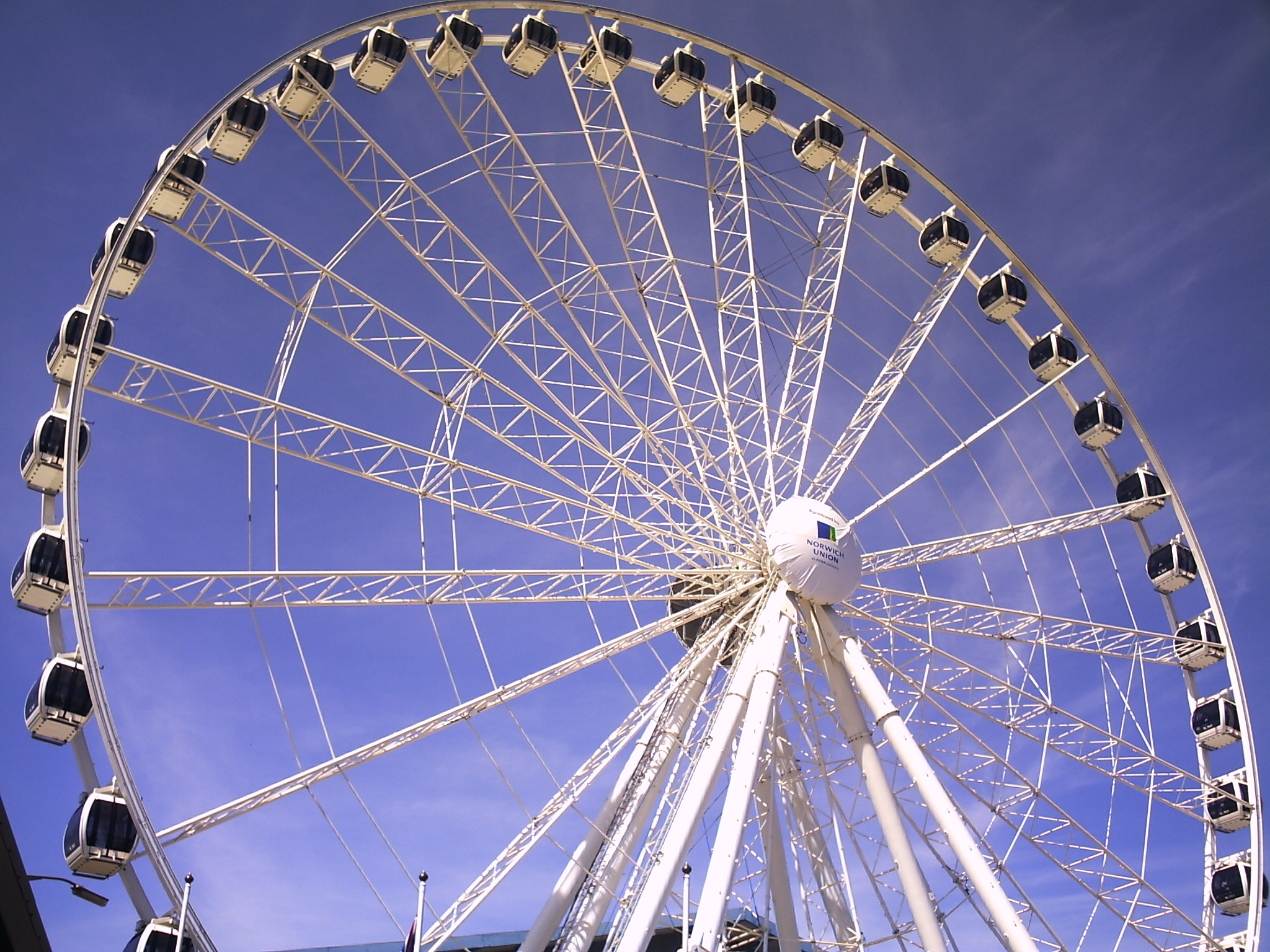
Yorkshire Wheel, 2006

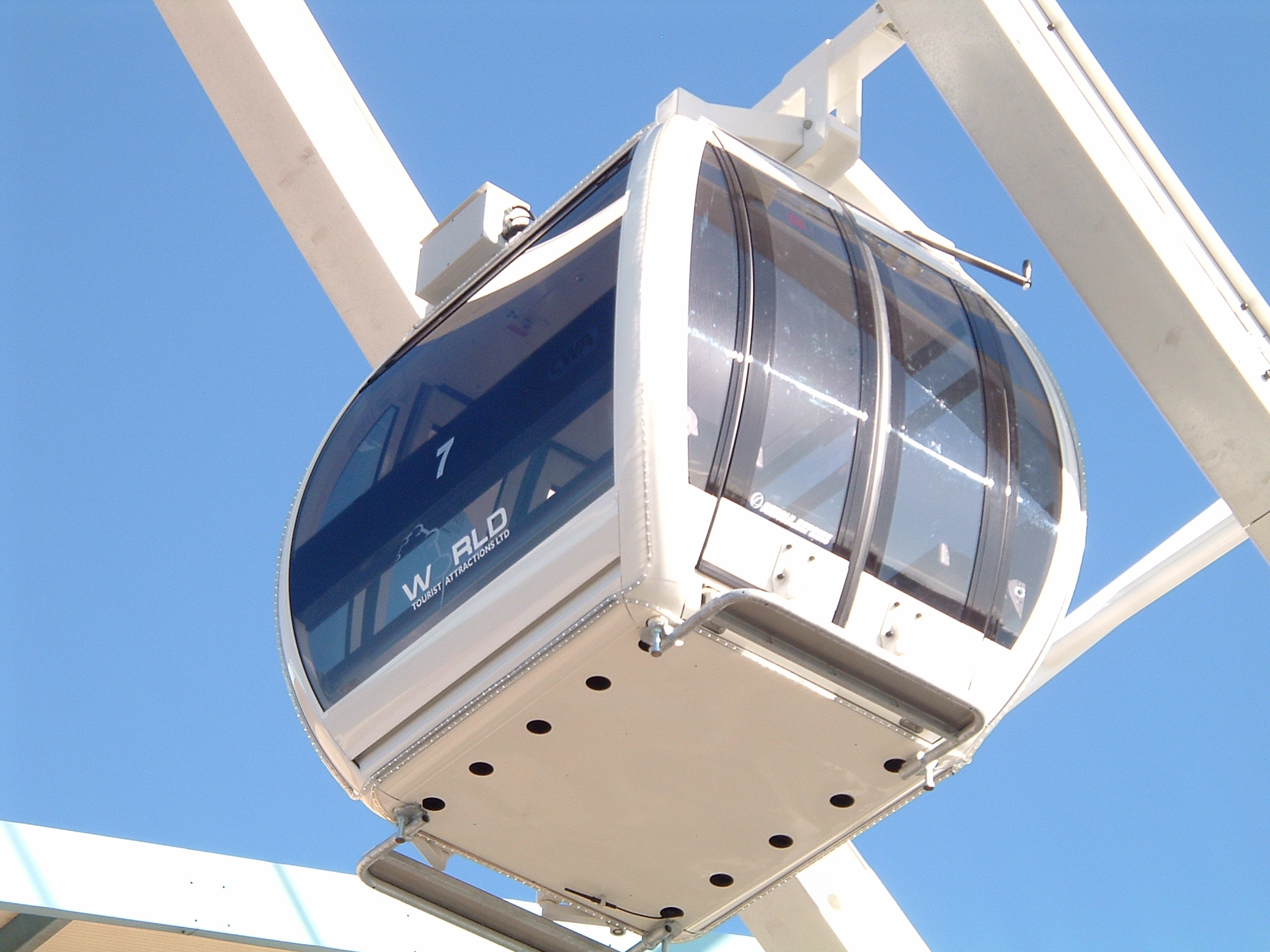
One of the Yorkshire Wheel's passenger gondolas

Yorkshire Wheel was the name used by two transportable Ferris wheel installations at different locations in York, England.

The first installation, at the National Railway Museum, operated from 12 April 2006 until 2 November 2008.

The second installation, at The Principal York, operated from 13 December 2011 until 30 September 2013. It was also known as the Wheel of York or York Wheel.

During 2014, the official website carried the message "Now Closed - Reopening 2014".

== 2006 installation ==
Coordinates: 53°57′36″N 1°05′44″W

The Yorkshire Wheel was originally intended to be placed in the Tower Gardens on the other side of the River Ouse, opposite Cliffords Tower; however, because of residents' protests, the National Railway Museum site was preferred by the City of York Council. Planning permission was for three years.

In its first six months, the wheel carried 200,000 passengers.

It was the first wheel of its kind in North Yorkshire, and was inspired by the London Eye which opened a few years earlier. At 54 metres (177 ft), it was somewhat smaller than the 135 metres (443 ft) of the London Eye, but could be no higher than York Minster, York's skyline height limit.

The operation of the wheel differed from that of the London Eye: visitors were allowed several rotations, and the wheel stopped to load and unload passengers. It had 42 passenger gondolas, including a VIP gondola with glass floor, screen, radio, and leather interior. Like the rest of the National Railway Museum, it was licensed as a venue for weddings, and weddings did indeed take place there. Speed dating on St. Valentine's Day in 2007 also took place.

Norwich Union, which has its headquarters in York, were the sponsors of the wheel, but that ended in late July 2007, after which the White Rose of York was added to the wheel's centre.

On the wheel's first anniversary, it was reported to have completed 32,500 revolutions.

In March 2008, tourist chiefs for the city called for the wheel to become a permanent fixture beyond its three years.

On 27 August 2008, the local newspaper The Press reported that the wheel might be moved to another site in the city, although a day later the opposition of conservation groups was noted.

The wheel turned for its final time in its original location on Sunday 2 November 2008. It was subsequently dismantled and was expected to be shipped abroad.

== 2009 proposal ==
In December 2008 local media announced that plans would be put forward "within weeks" for the relocation of the wheel to the riverside.

A news article in The Press on 10 January 2009 stated that 42 per cent of local people backed the wheel being relocated to the North Street site in the centre of the city.

The Press reported on 20 January 2009 that local councillors had rejected the relocation of the wheel, though talks were still ongoing on 20 February 2009, and on 10 March 2009 the paper reported a possible move to another site, St. George's Field car park, though councillors had still not agreed to the move, though the talks passed their first stage by 18 March.

The Press reported on 10 July 2009 that there had been many objections to the relocation of the wheel, and that it may never return to the city.

Plans for the return of the wheel were withdrawn on 14 July 2009.

== 2011 installation ==
Coordinates: 53.9591°N 1.0914°W

On 2 December 2010 it was announced that the wheel was set to return to York, ready to be up and running by 2011.

The wheel finally looked set for a return in news announced in October 2011.

After construction in The Principal York gardens was delayed for a few days by high winds, the operator, Great City Attractions, opened the 53.3-metre (175 ft) tall wheel to the public at 4:45 pm on Tuesday 13 December 2011.

In July 2012 Great City Attractions went into administration. All its British wheels were bought by Dubai-based Freij Entertainment International, for operation by its UK subsidiary Wheels Entertainments.

In February 2013 an application by Freij Entertainment International for the Yorkshire Wheel to remain in place until 30 November 2013 was considered by the City of York Council's planning committee. It was given permission to remain on the site only until 31 October. It last operated on 30 September 2013 and was then dismantled.
