= Corn Exchange, Manchester =

Building in Manchester, England

Coordinates: 53°29′06″N 2°14′35″W

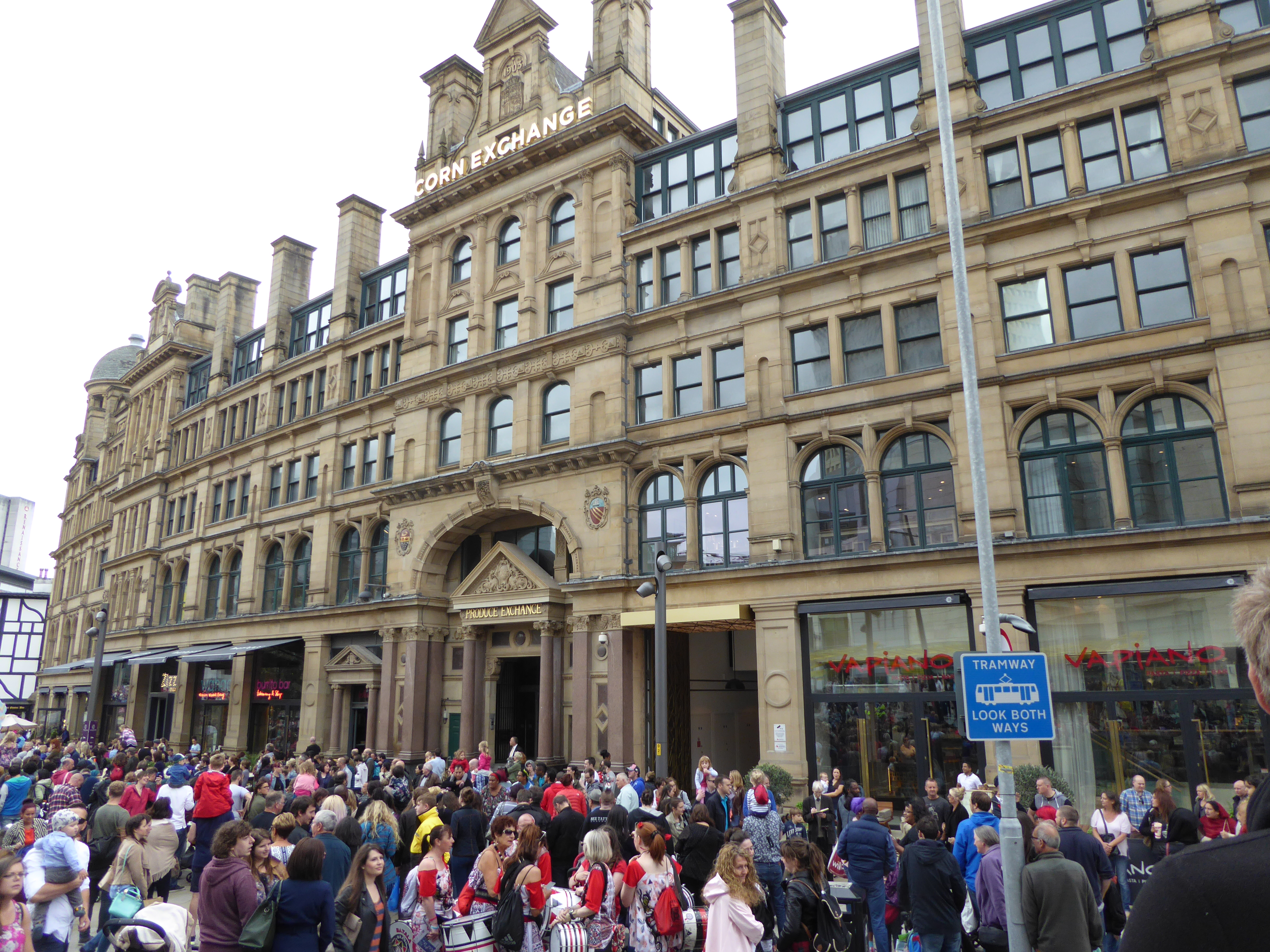
- The Corn Exchange
- Location: Manchester, England
- Address: Exchange Square
- Opened: 1903 (redeveloped 2000 and 2015)
- Closed: 2014 (as a shopping centre)
- Architect: Ball & Elce; Potts, Son, & Hennings
- Num. of stores: 17
- Floor area: 141,722 sq ft (13,166.4 m^{2})
- Floors: 3
- Website: cornexchangemanchester.co.uk

Listed Building – Grade II
- Official name: Former Corn and Produce Exchange
- Designated: 30 March 1973
- Reference no.: 1282970

The Corn Exchange, Manchester is a food court and former shopping centre in Exchange Square, Manchester, England. The building was originally used as a corn exchange and was previously named the Corn & Produce Exchange, and subsequently The Triangle. Following an IRA bomb attack on central Manchester in 1996, it was renovated and was a modern shopping centre until 2014. The building was sold to investors and has been re-developed into a number of food outlets. It is a grade II listed building.

== History ==
The first Corn Exchange built on this site was designed by Richard Lane and completed in 1837. By the late 19th century, it was considered too small, and civic officials decided to commission a larger building.

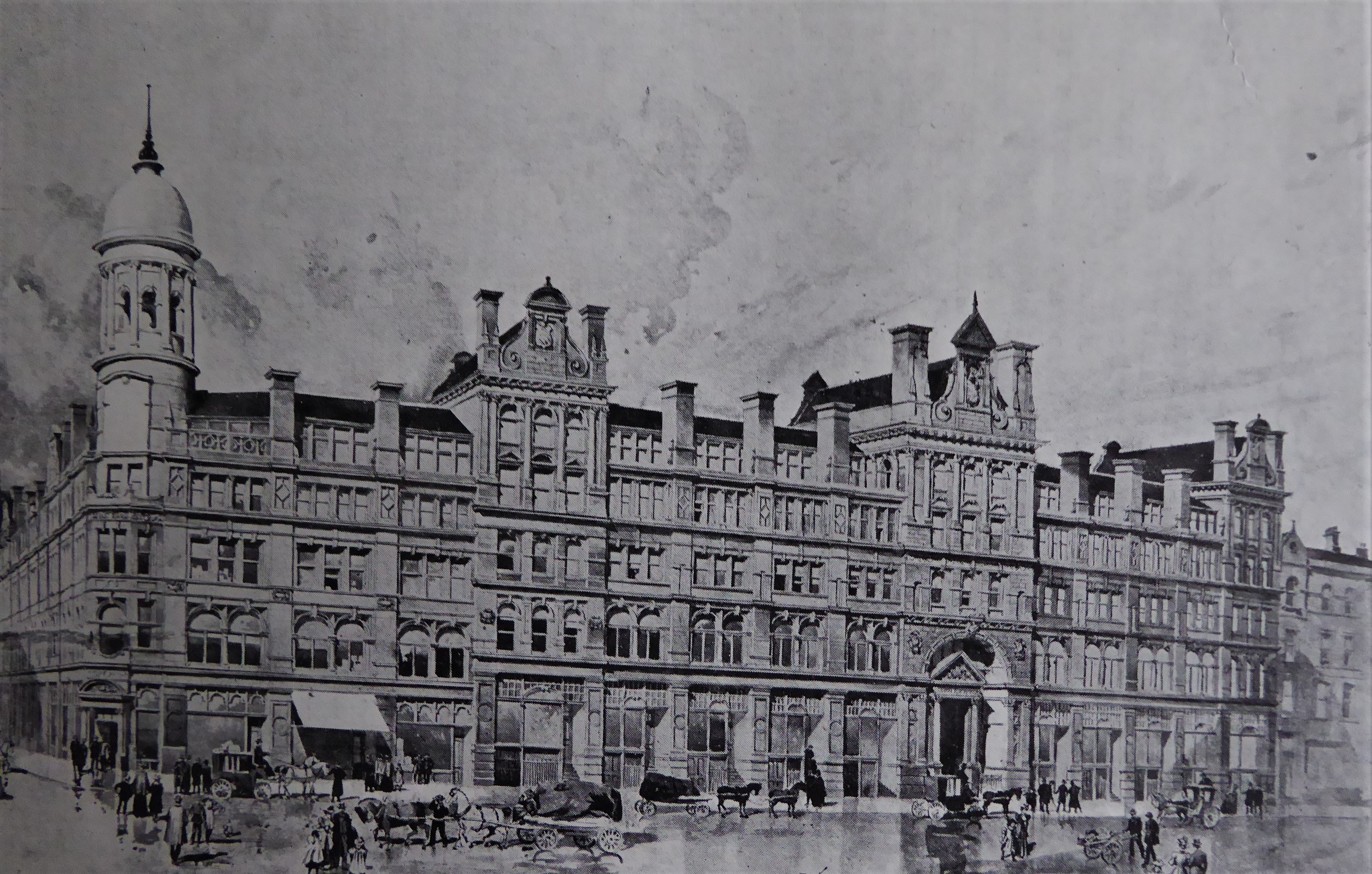
Corn, Grocery & Produce Exchange, Manchester, c.1902

The current building was designed in the Baroque style, and built in two sections. Each section was designed by a different architect, the first by Ball & Elce and built between 1896 and 1899, and the second by Potts, Son, & Hennings and built between 1899 and 1903.

The volume of trading in corn declined significantly in the wake of the Great Depression of British Agriculture and the building was largely disused in the wake of the Second World War. In the 1960s to early 1980s, while the interior fell into disuse, the rear side of the Corn Exchange on Fennel Street became home to various nightclubs, including Pips, an important part of Manchester's music scene, where in 1978 Joy Division played their first gig under this name. A number of shops with street access on the building's basement level also continued to operate throughout this period. The Corn Exchange was briefly used by the Royal Exchange Theatre Company from 1976 and it served as a filming location for Granada Television's Brideshead Revisited in 1981.

Over time, the interior developed into a large market emporium, and was a gathering place for alternative subcultures. Small stallholders sold items such as clothes, jewellery, historical paraphernalia and second-hand records. Most of the shops were temporary structures built on the central trading floor, while a few operated from the rooms arranged around the perimeter. A café was located in part of the basement, to the northeast of the ground floor.

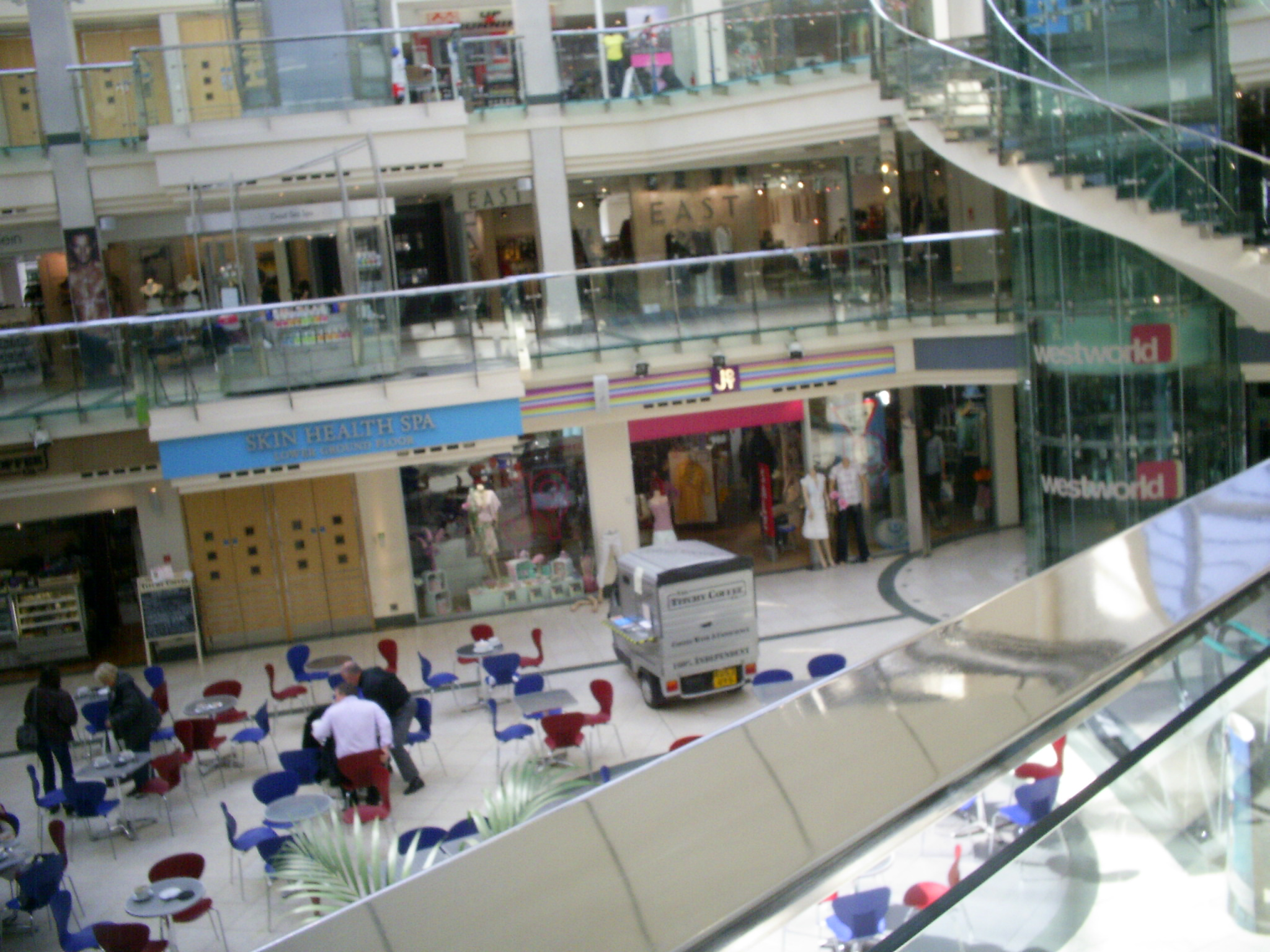
The Corn Exchange as the Triangle shopping centre in 2006

In 1996, the IRA carried out a bomb attack on central Manchester. All of the Corn Exchange's windows were blown in by the blast; the glass dome shattering and falling onto the market area below. Structural and masonry damage were also reported. The landlord invoked a force majeure condition in the lease to evict all tenants. Some businesses moved to new premises, mostly in the north of the city, where many foundered. The Corn Exchange was subsequently renovated and reopened as the Triangle Shopping Centre, named in reference to the building's shape. In 2005, the then-owners, the Blackstone Group and its UK-based partner, Milligan Retail Resorts International, sold the complex to the Norwich Property Trust, for £67 million.

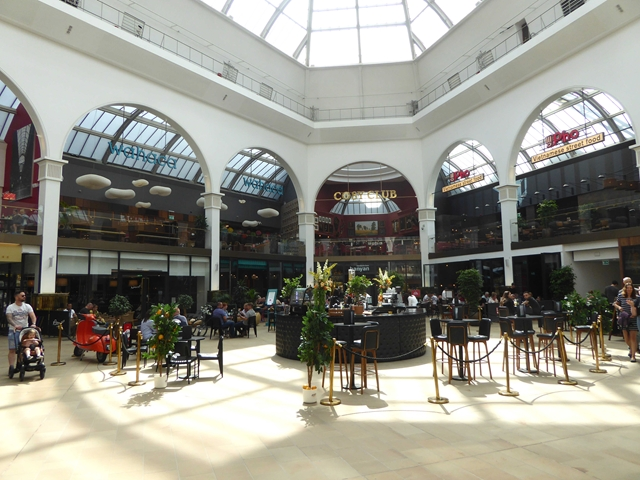
The Corn Exchange as a food court in 2018; shopping centre additions were removed in the refit

In 2012, The Triangle was relaunched as Corn Exchange, Manchester and plans were revealed to convert the building into a food outlet and hotel. A demolition company commenced work to strip out modern interior materials and fixtures in 2014, and a food outlet opened in the complex in 2015. An apartment hotel, developed by Roomzzz Aparthotels, opened in 2018. It accommodates a reception area on the ground floor and 114 rooms on the upper floors.

== See also ==
- Listed buildings in Manchester-M4
- Corn exchanges in England
