= Great City Attractions =

Great City Attractions Limited, also known as Great City Attractions Global, was a company engaged in the operation of large transportable Ferris wheels. Based in Sutton Coldfield, UK, it was incorporated in 2008. It went into administration in July 2012 and ceased trading the following month.

== Formation ==
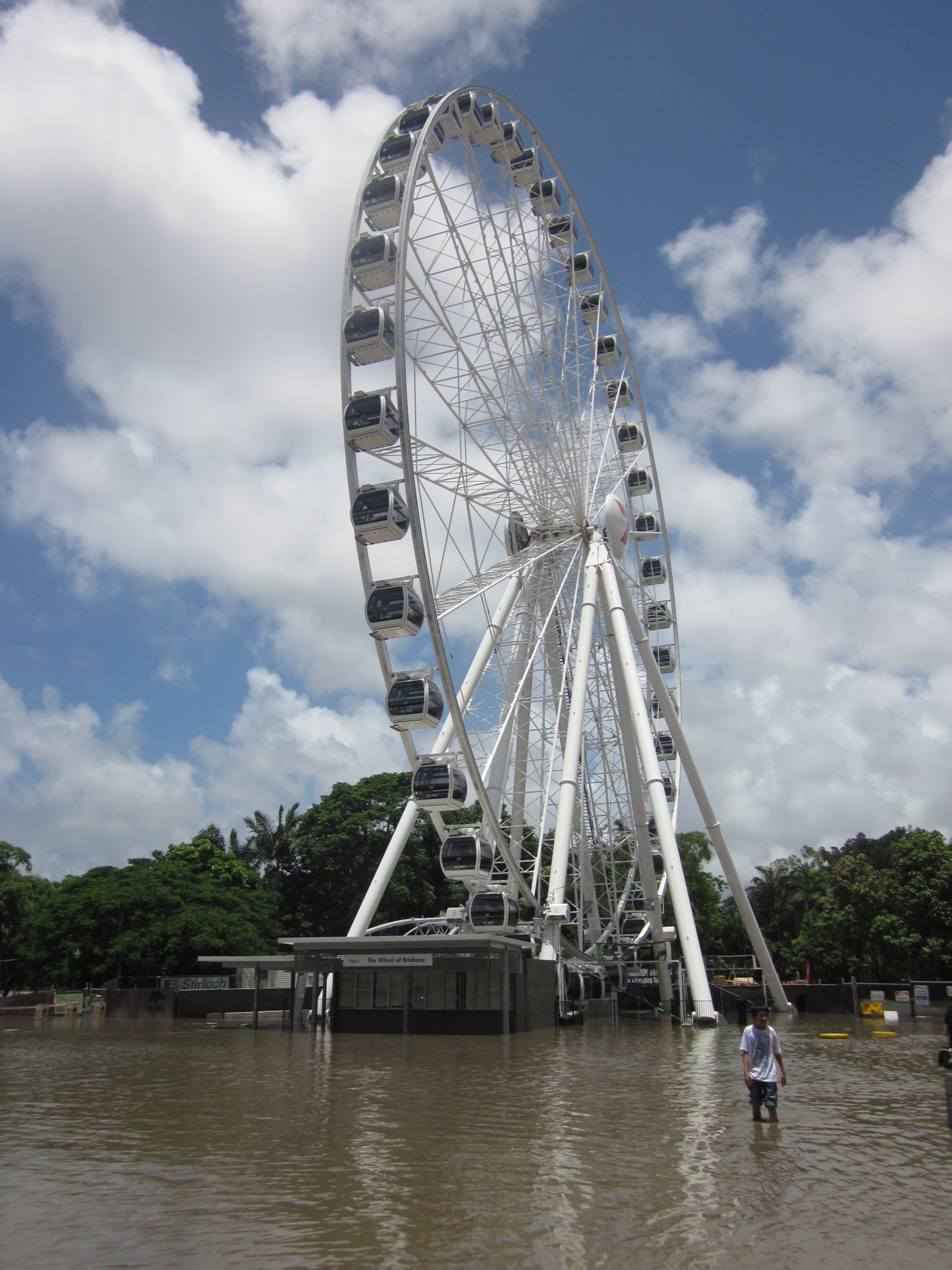
Wheel of Brisbane, a Bussink R60, during flooding in January 2011

In 2009, Great Wheel Corporation merged with World Tourist Attractions, to operate as Great City Attractions, claiming at that time to be "the world's largest operator of Observation Wheels." [sic]

On 23 December 2010, the holding company WTA Global Holdings, which traded as World Tourist Attractions, went into administration. The company collapsed owing £16.4 million, including £8.9 million to unsecured creditors, who were expected to get nothing.

Early in 2011 the assets of WTA Global Holdings were bought out of administration for £230,000 by Great City Attractions. At that time, Great City Attractions was operating as a subsidiary of Elliot Hall Ltd, a company set up by WTA Global Holdings director Elliot Hall. WTA Global Holdings was the holding company for World Tourist Attractions.

== Collapse ==
On 20 July 2012, Great City Attractions Global Limited also went into administration. It ceased trading the following month, owing £6 million.

Shortly before its collapse, Great City Attractions was operating several large transportable wheels in the UK, including installations at Glasgow, Liverpool, Plymouth, and York, as well as the Wheel of Brisbane in Australia. A further wheel in Manchester had been dismantled in April 2012 and transported to Edinburgh, only to prove too large to gain access to its new site.

The Liverpool wheel stopped operating, but a new operator, The Hall Organisation Ltd., with the same director (Elliot Hall) as Great City Attractions, took over the running of the Plymouth and York installations. Both wheels were owned by Shipley Investments Ltd. of Dudley, who had rented them to Great City Attractions, and who had then repossessed them prior to the administrators being called in.

In January 2013 it was reported that the British-based Ferris wheels previously operated by Great City Attractions Global, which included the Glasgow, Liverpool, Manchester, Plymouth, and York wheels, had been purchased for an undisclosed sum by Dubai-based Freij Entertainment International, and would be operated by its Staffordshire-based UK operations arm Wheels Entertainments Ltd.
