= Exchange Square tram stop =

Manchester Metrolink tram stop

Exchange Square
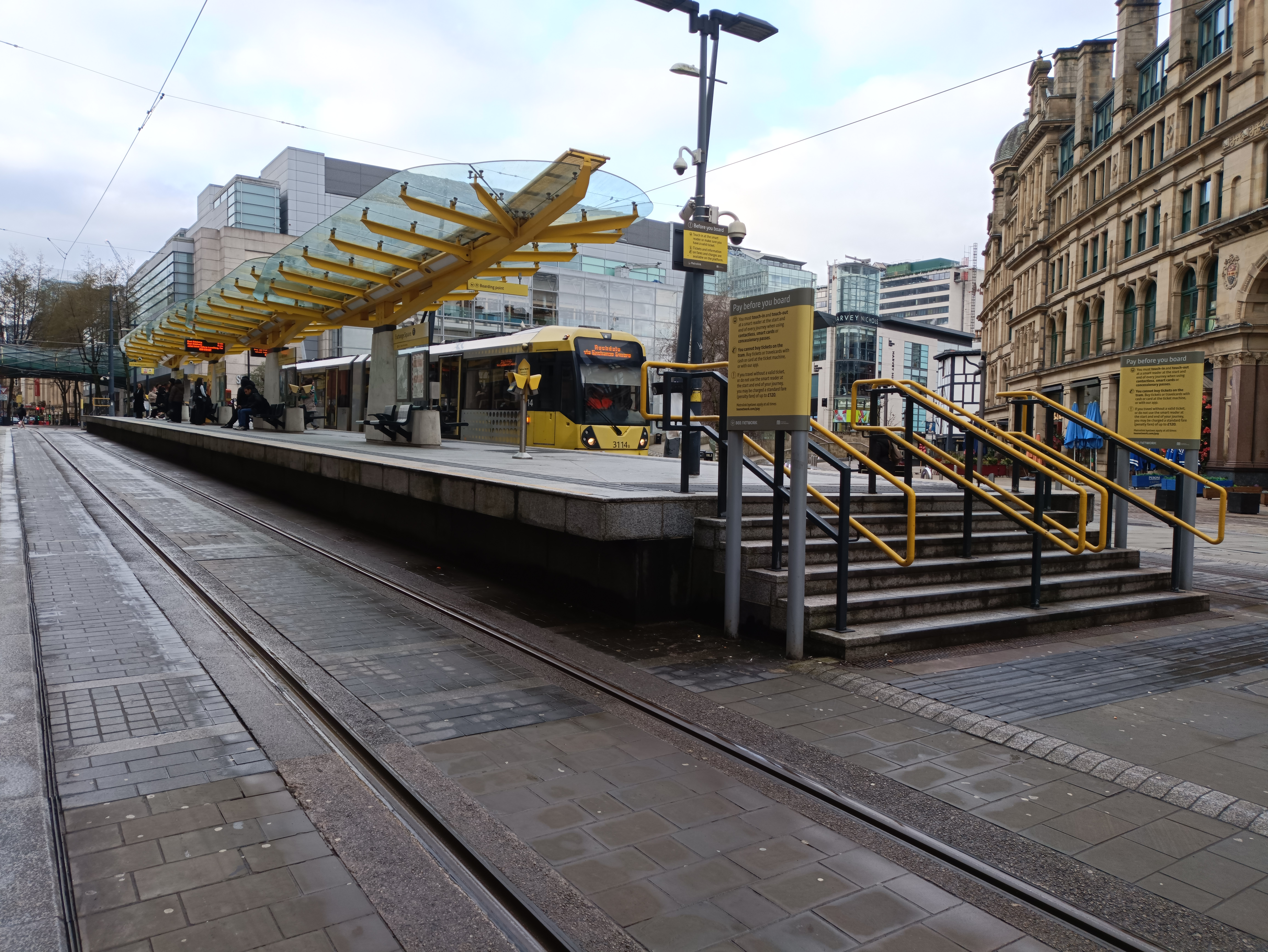
- Exchange Square tram stop in February 2026.

General information
- Location: Exchange Square, Manchester; England
- Coordinates: 53.4844°N 2.2426°W
- Grid reference: SJ839986
- System: Manchester Metrolink
- Operator: KeolisAmey
- Transit authority: Transport for Greater Manchester
- Line: Second City Crossing
- Platforms: 2 (island)
- Tram routes

Other information
- Status: In operation
- Station code: EXS
- Fare zone: 1
- Website: https://tfgm.com/travel-updates/live-departures/tram/exchange-square-tram/

History
- Opened: 6 December 2015; 10 years ago
Route map
Location

Exchange Square is a tram stop on the Manchester Metrolink's Second City Crossing line, and opened on 6 December 2015 as part of Phase 2CC of the network's expansion. It is located by the main entrance to the Manchester Arndale shopping centre, and is also close to the Printworks.

== History ==
The 2CC (Second City Crossing) route was first proposed in 2011 as a means to improve capacity and relieve congestion as the rest of the system expanded. Funded by the Greater Manchester Transport Fund, its route begins at a rebuilt St Peter's Square tram stop, and runs along Princess Street, Cross Street and Corporation Street to re-join the original Metrolink line at Victoria. Exchange Square is the line's only tram stop.

The Second City Crossing was granted approval on 8 October 2013 by the Secretary of State for Transport, and signed off on 28 October 2013 by the GMCA.

Construction began in 2014 and the line from Victoria to Exchange Square was tested in November 2015. The stop opened as a north-facing terminus on 6 December 2015 with trams running to Shaw and Crompton at first. The full Second City Crossing was completed in early 2017 from Exchange Square to St Peter's Square. Services to East Didsbury and Rochdale then joined the 2CC.

== Layout ==
Exchange Square tram stop consists of two platforms (island platform). There are four large canopies over the stop which covers most of the platforms. At the stop, there are eight seats and four perch seats on each platform. There are two ticket machines back-to-back near the centre of the stop. One passenger help point is also located near the ticket machines.

Two dot matrix passenger information displays hang from the canopies serving one platform each, and show estimated arrival times for trams in minutes up to 30 minutes prior (up to three at a time) and number of carriages.

There are two ramps at each end of the platforms, providing step-free access for passengers, and several signs on the platforms indicating the name of the stop, its fare zone, tram destinations, and some indicate any closure notices or announcements for passengers.

== Services ==
Services run every 12 minutes on all routes. Some routes (not shown here) only run during peak times.

From this stop, services run to East Didsbury in one direction and to Victoria, Oldham and Rochdale in the other. Tram stops at Shudehill and Market Street are both a 3-5 minute walk away from here, forming out-of-station interchanges.

Preceding station	Manchester Metrolink	Following station
St Peter's Square towards East Didsbury	East Didsbury–Shaw (peak only)	Victoria towards Shaw and Crompton
St Peter's Square towards East Didsbury	East Didsbury–Rochdale	Victoria towards Rochdale Town Centre

== Transport connections ==
=== Other trams ===
Exchange Square tram stop is a three-minute walk away from Shudehill Interchange: a tram stop and bus station. Tram services operate from Shudehill to Manchester Airport and Bury, and Altrincham during peak times.

The same services operate through Market Street, a five-minute walk away.

Manchester Victoria rail station is around the same distance away, and also has a tram stop.

=== Buses ===
Bus services operate close by near the National Football Museum, on routes 41, 59, 113, and 135. To the south, also nearby, is the 2 Free Bus route, and 8, X41, and X43.

=== Trains ===
This tram stop is not connected to any railway stations, but the nearest one is Manchester Victoria, a 3-5 minute walk away. Manchester Victoria can also be reached directly via tram.

== Gallery ==
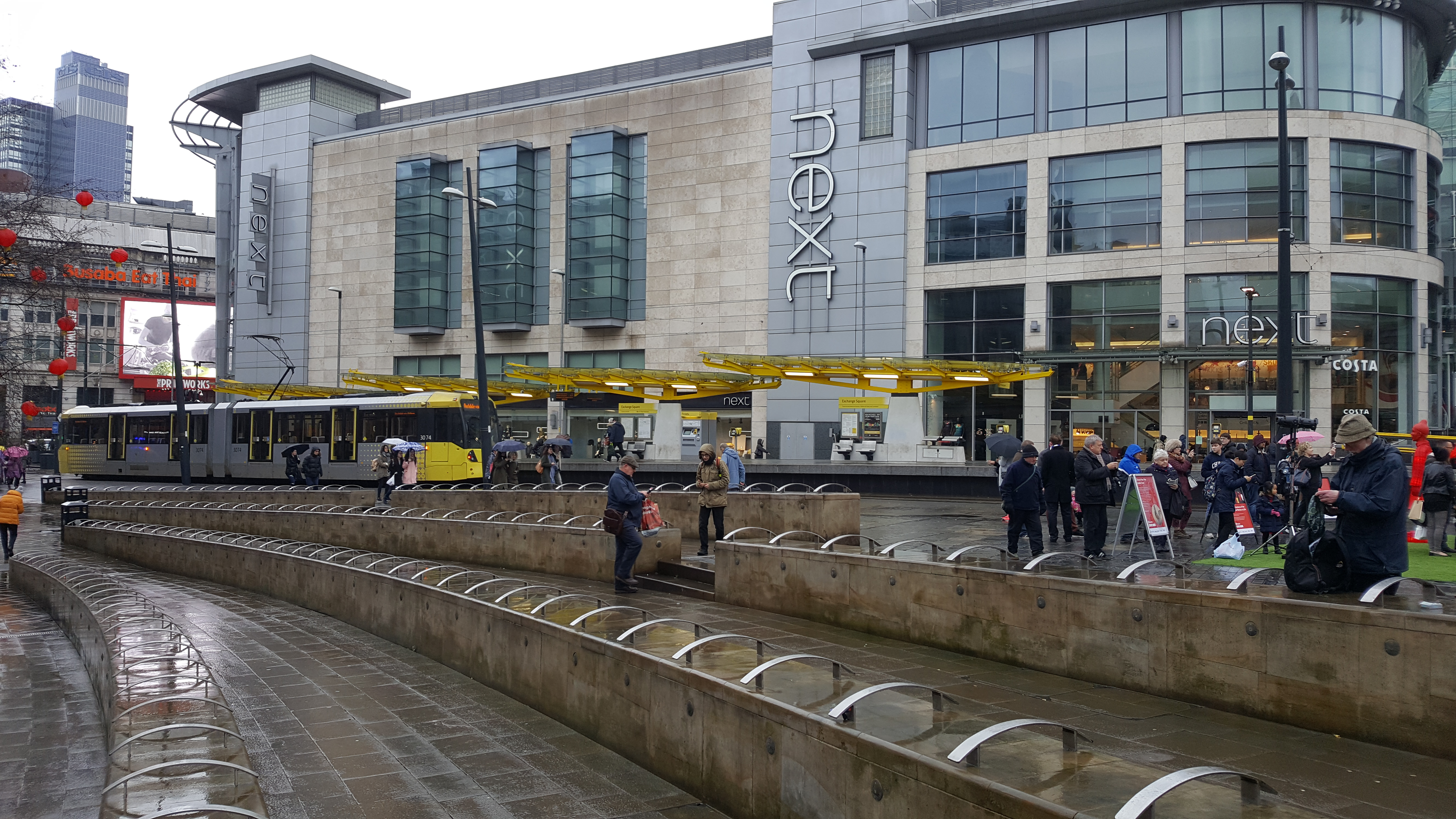
Street view of Exchange Square tram stop.

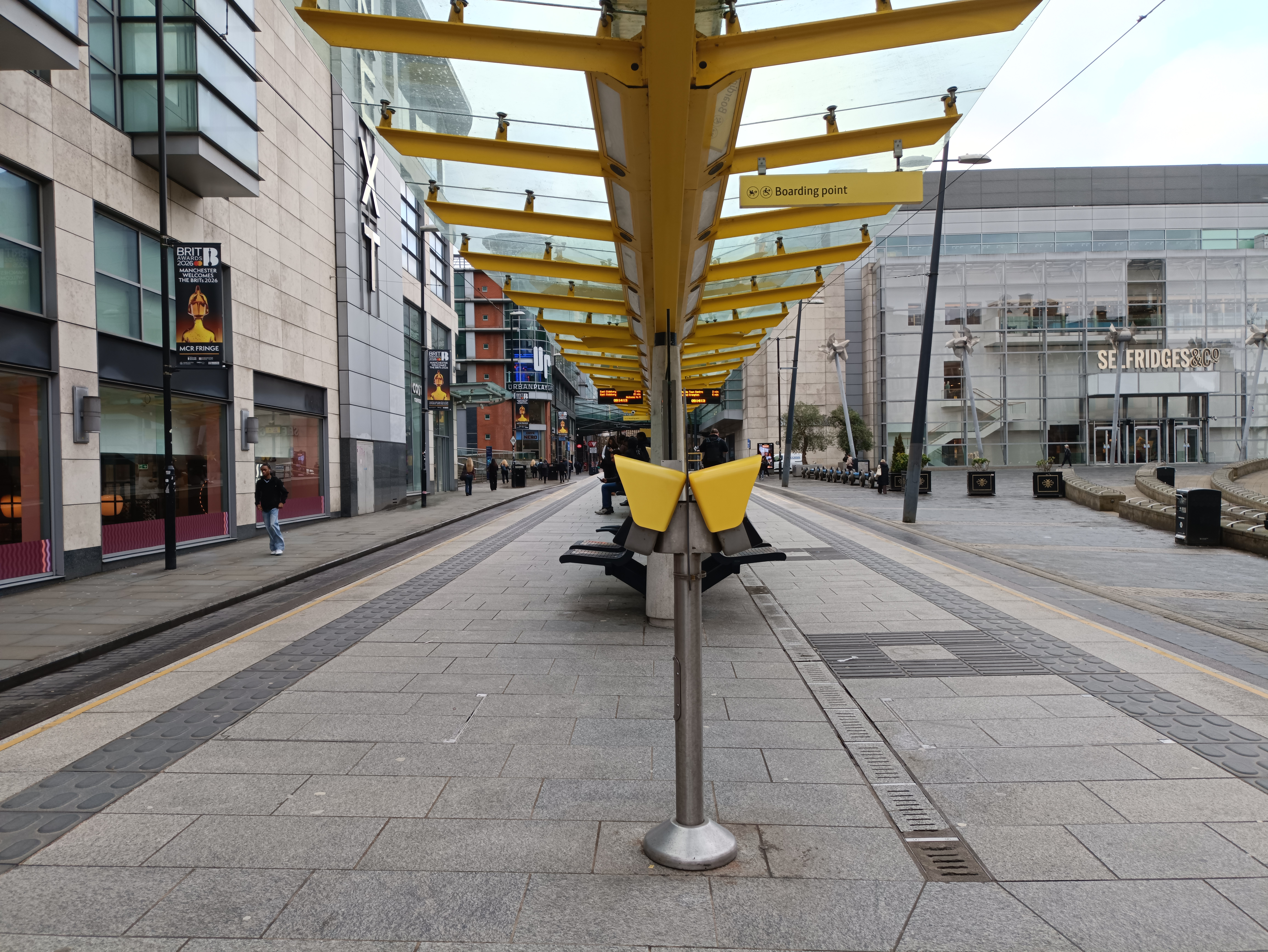
Platform view of Exchange Square tram stop.
