= Bayside Blue =

Articulated bus service in Yokohama, Japan

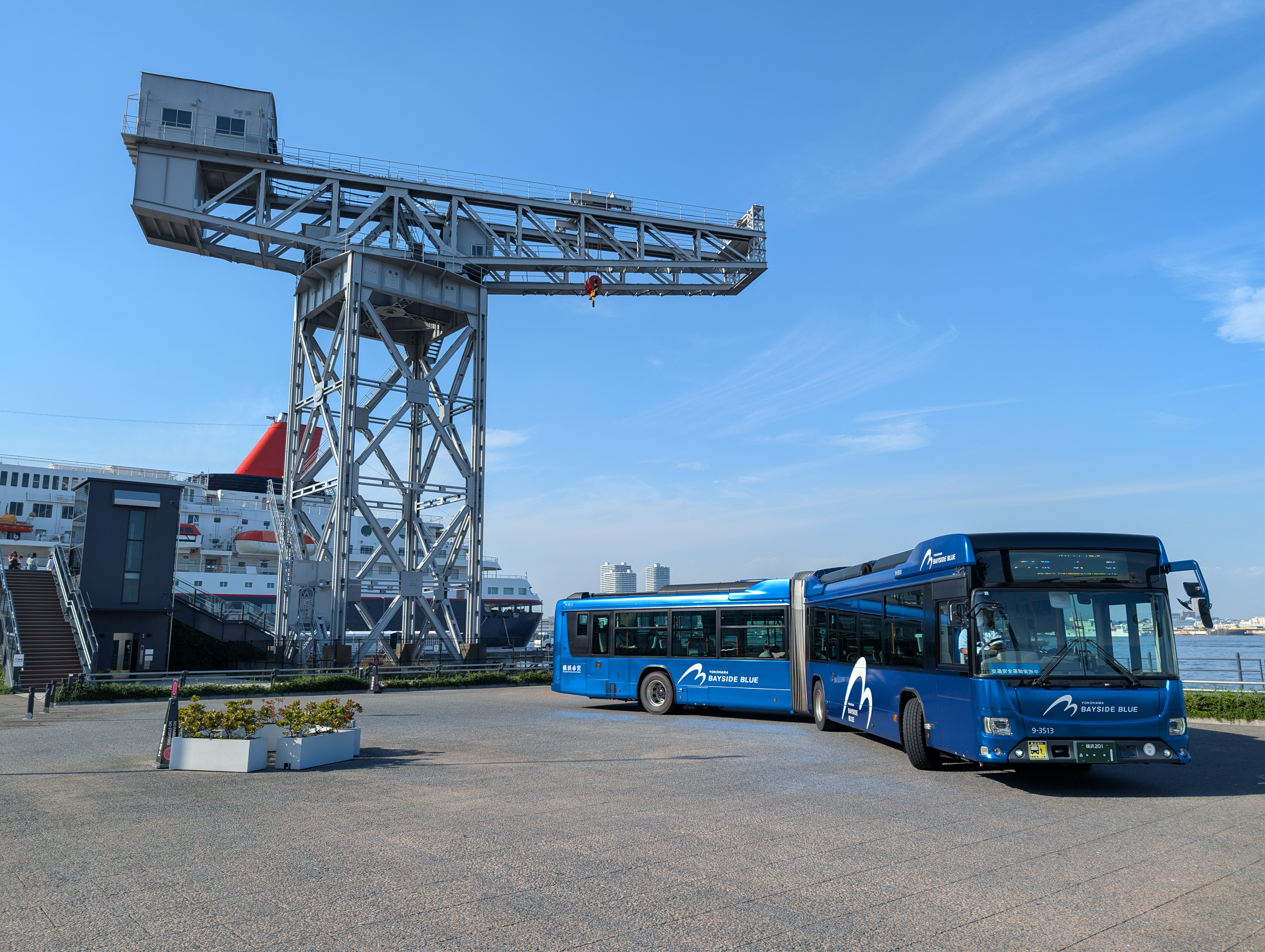
- Bayside Blue U-turning at Yokohama Hammerhead Int'l Cruise Terminal

Overview
- System: Yokohama Municipal Bus
- Operator: Yokohama City Transportation Bureau
- Depot: Takigashira Depot
- Vehicle: Hino Blue Ribbon Hybrid articulated bus
- Status: Operational
- Began service: July 2020

Route
- Route type: City sightseeing bus route
- Locale: Yokohama, Kanagawa, Japan
- Communities served: Minato Mirai, Shinko, Yamashita
- Landmarks served: Yokohama Red Brick Warehouse; Pacifico Yokohama; Hikawa Maru
- Start: Yokohama Station (East Exit Bus Terminal)
- Via: Yokohama Chinatown
- End: Yokohama Station (in front of ticket gates)
- Length: 12.40 km
- Stops: 15

Service
- Frequency: Approximately 2 services per hour
- Journey time: Approximately 75–85 minutes
- Operates: From the 9:00 a.m. hour to the 7:00 p.m. hour
- Timetable: Bayside Blue timetable
- Front-door boarding with a flat fare paid upon entry.

Bayside Blue (ベイサイドブルー, Beisaido Burū) is a tourism-oriented articulated bus service operated by the Yokohama City Transportation Bureau in Yokohama, Japan. Introduced in July 2020 as part of the city's waterfront regeneration policy, with the aim of improving visitor circulation and public transport connectivity across Yokohama's central waterfront districts, including Minato Mirai 21 and Yamashita Park area.

The route operates on a loop alignment originating at Yokohama Station and runs approximately 12 km (7.5 miles) along the waterfront, linking major cultural, commercial, and port-related facilities. A full circuit takes about 75 to 85 minutes, and the service functions as a regular public bus while primarily serving tourism and leisure travel in the city centre.

Bayside Blue is operated using a dedicated fleet of four articulated buses, which were the first domestically developed, mass-produced articulated buses in Japan. The vehicles are painted in a distinctive monochromatic matte metallic blue livery that was designed to visually distinguish the service from standard municipal bus routes. Under the Ministry of Land, Infrastructure, Transport and Tourism's classification, the service is categorized as a BRT (bus rapid transit) system for specific purposes, such as tourism.

== History ==
=== Planning and policy background (2015-2018) ===
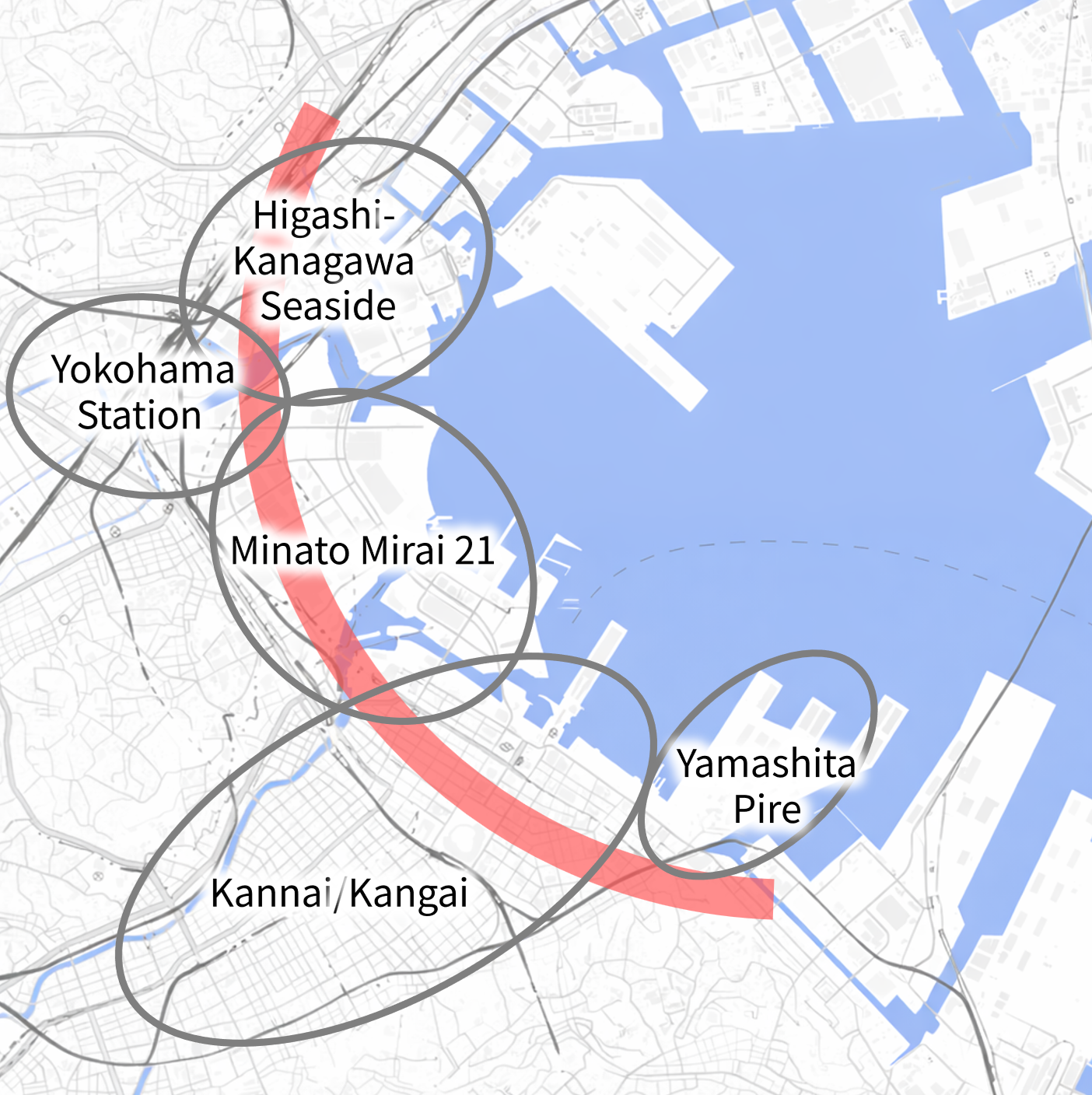
Conceptual diagram of the "Port Area Axis"

In February 2016, the Yokohama City Urban Development Bureau presented plans to introduce an articulated bus system. The report noted limited waterfront transit and proposed a network centered on the "Port Area Axis". LRT was also evaluated. However, due to difficulties in securing dedicated lanes, the city chose to introduce a bus-based system by fiscal 2020 while continuing to study LRT as a long-term option.

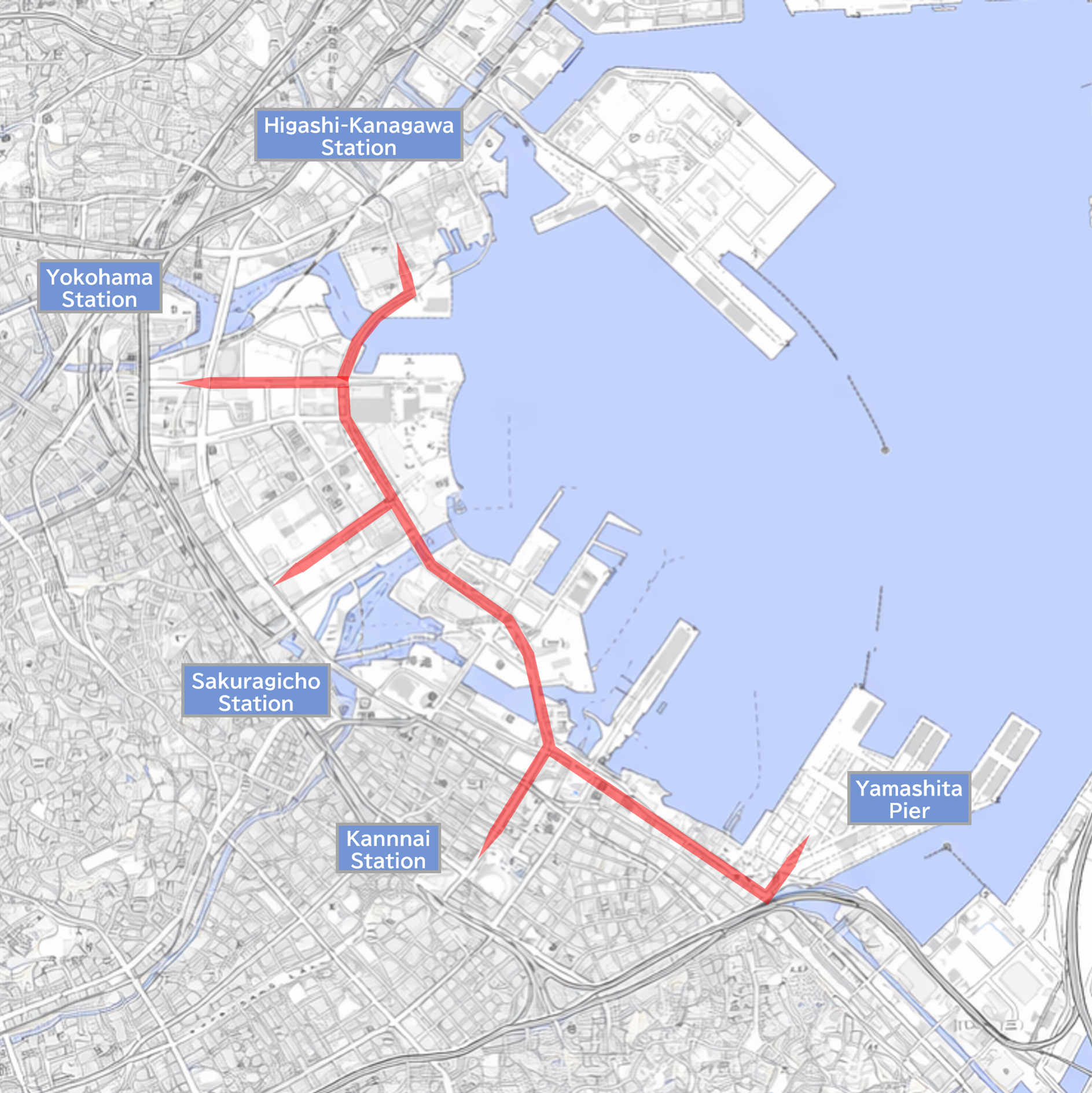
Conceptual route, circa 2016

In May 2017, the Yokohama City Urban Development Bureau presented the core concept of the articlated bus system to the City Council, describing it as a service intended to improve circulation in the central waterfront area for residents and visitors. The Yokohama City Transportation Bureau was designated as the operator, while infrastructure improvements were to be undertaken by other city agencies.

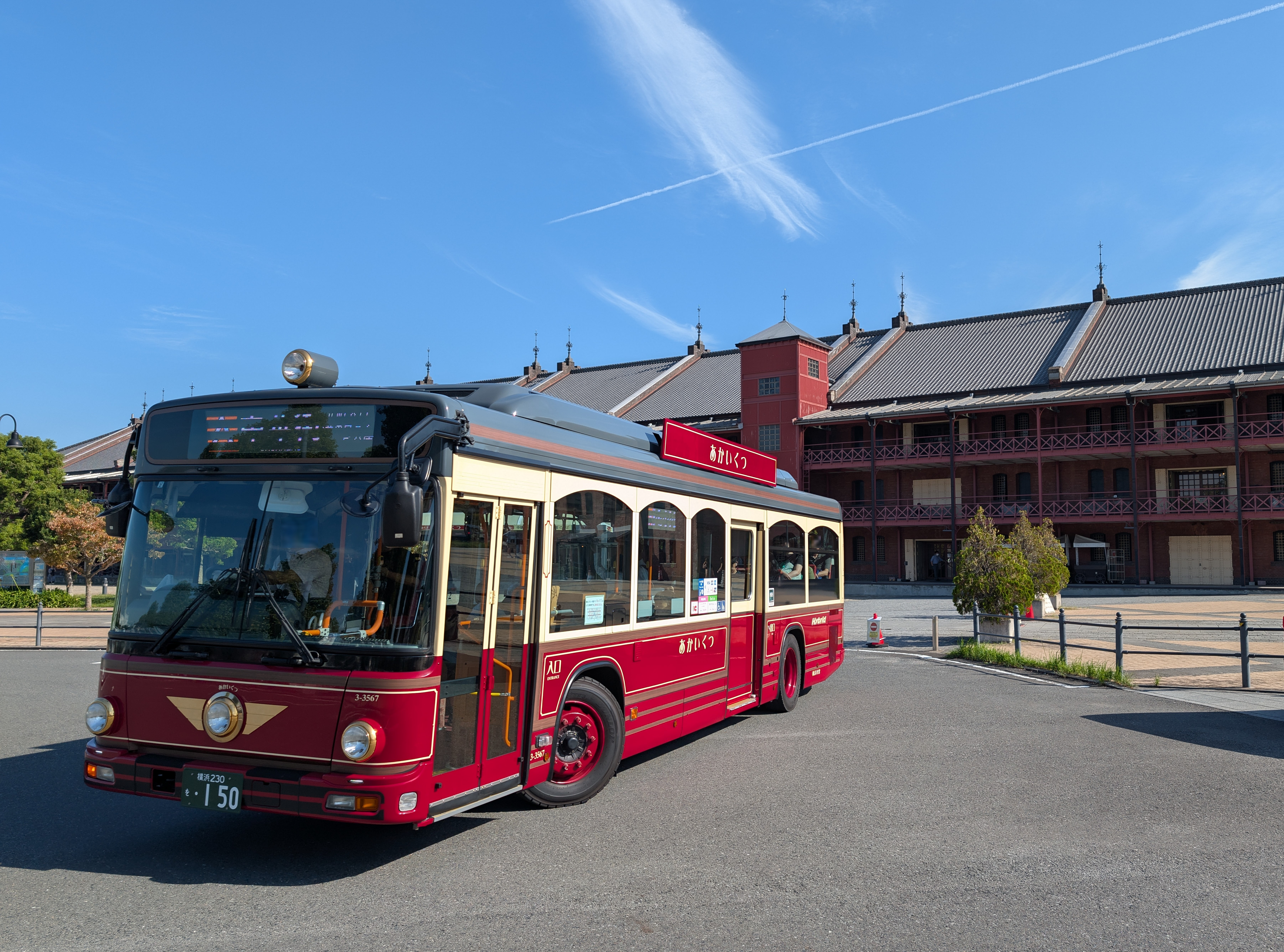
"Akai kutsu", the Bureau-run sightseeing bus

The project cost was estimated at ¥2 billion, excluding operating expenses, covering vehicles and related facilities. Articulated buses were selected for their high capacity and envisioned as a new city icon.The initial route was planned to run from Yokohama Station along the Port Area Axis, connecting major waterfront destinations. The bureau also anticipated integration with existing sightseeing services, including the Akai Kutsu line.

In October 2018, the Yokohama City Urban Development Bureau presented a detailed action plan to the City Council. The plan confirmed an initial route between Yokohama Station East Exit and Yamashita Pier and included a restructuring of existing bus services.

It specified the operation of four articulated buses running two to three times per hour between 10:00 and 19:00. The service branding was also unveiled, including the name Bayside Blue, a dedicated symbol mark, and a matte metallic blue livery. The city estimated annual ridership at 580,000 and projected operating profitability by the sixth year, including depreciation.

=== Procurement and launch (2019–2020) ===
In spring 2019, the city issued a tender for four articulated buses, awarding the contract to Yokohama Hino Motors.

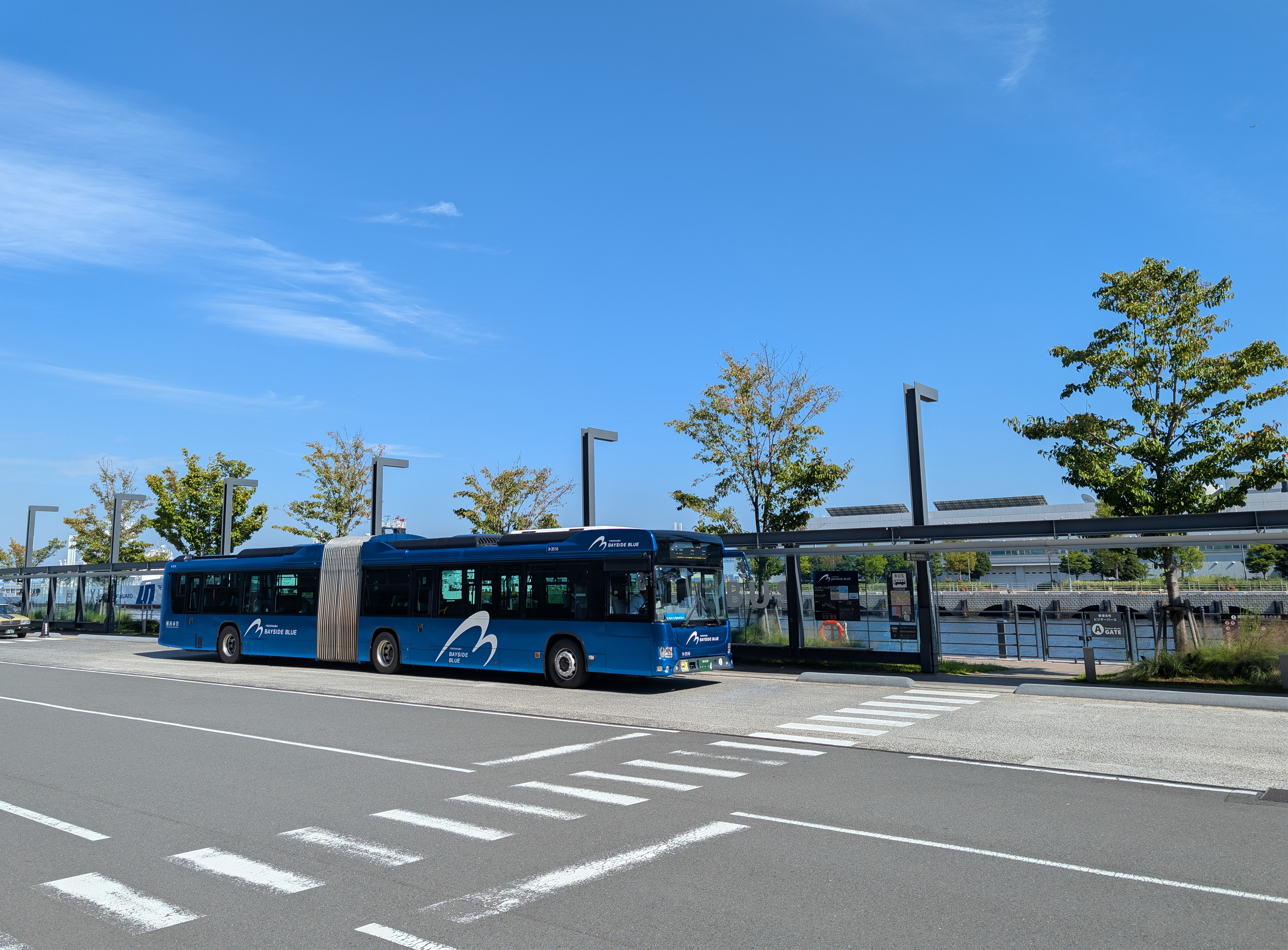
Yokohama Hammerhead Bus Stop

On February 5, 2020, Hino Motors delivered the Blue Ribbon Hybrid articulated, which was Japan's first domestically produced articulated bus, to the City of Yokohama. The vehicle was unveiled at Yokohama Hammerhead on February 10, and service was initially scheduled to begin in June 2020. However, the launch was postponed due to the COVID-19 state of emergency, and a revised start date of July 23 was later announced.

After a ceremony attended by Mayor Fumiko Hayashi on July 22, service began the following day. The launch coincided with a restructuring of the municipal bus network, including the discontinuation of certain overlapping routes within the Akai Kutsu service and adjustments to other lines, such as the Burari Sankeien Bus and Burari Nogeyama Zoo Bus.

=== Network adjustments (2023–present) ===
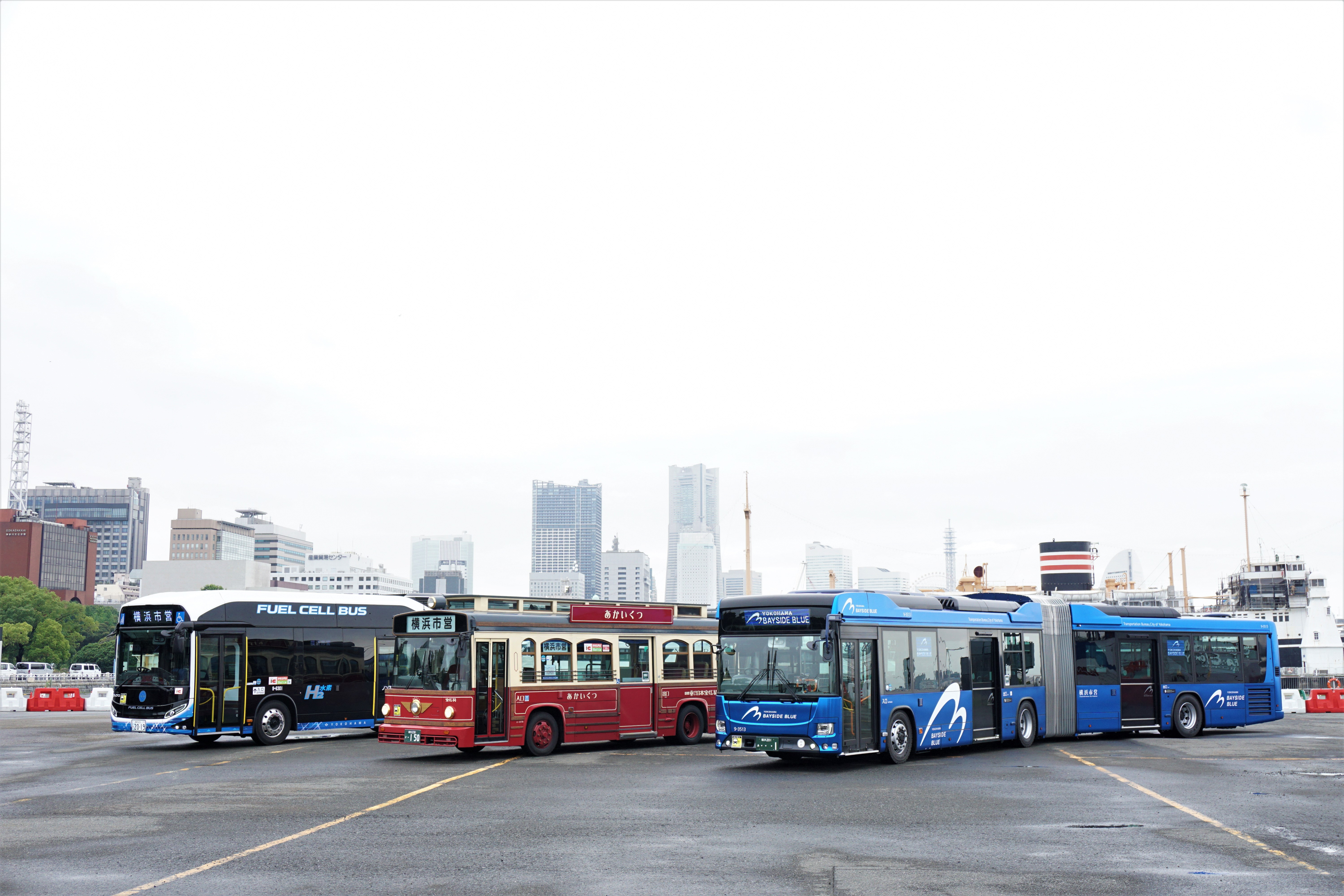
Municipal sightseeing buses including Bayside Blue.

Since its launch, the service has undergone several operational adjustments. In October 2023, an additional stop was introduced at Yokohama Hammerhead. In 2024, the service was included in a Ministry of Land, Infrastructure, Transport and Tourism pilot program for fully cashless bus operations, leading to the discontinuation of onboard cash fare payments. In March 2025, the Yamashita Pier terminus was abolished, and the route was reconfigured into a loop service originating and terminating at Yokohama Station.

== Route ==
Bayside Blue operates as a circular route serving cultural, commercial, and port-related destinations in Yokohama's central waterfront area.

=== Route alignment ===
Bayside Blue operates on a looped alignment through the Minato Mirai 21 and Yokohama waterfront areas. The route follows wide arterial roads and waterfront boulevards, with multiple directional changes to serve curbside stops and surrounding facilities. Due to road geometry and operational constraints of articulated buses, the route differs slightly between the outbound and inbound directions.

The service departs from the Yokohama Station East Exit terminal and proceeds south along National Route 1 before turning east onto Tochinoki-dori Avenue. In the Minato Mirai district, it continues southeast along Kokusai-odori Boulevard, passing the Pacifico Yokohama convention complex. To serve stops adjacent to these facilities, the alignment includes several directional reversals necessitated by the local road configuration.

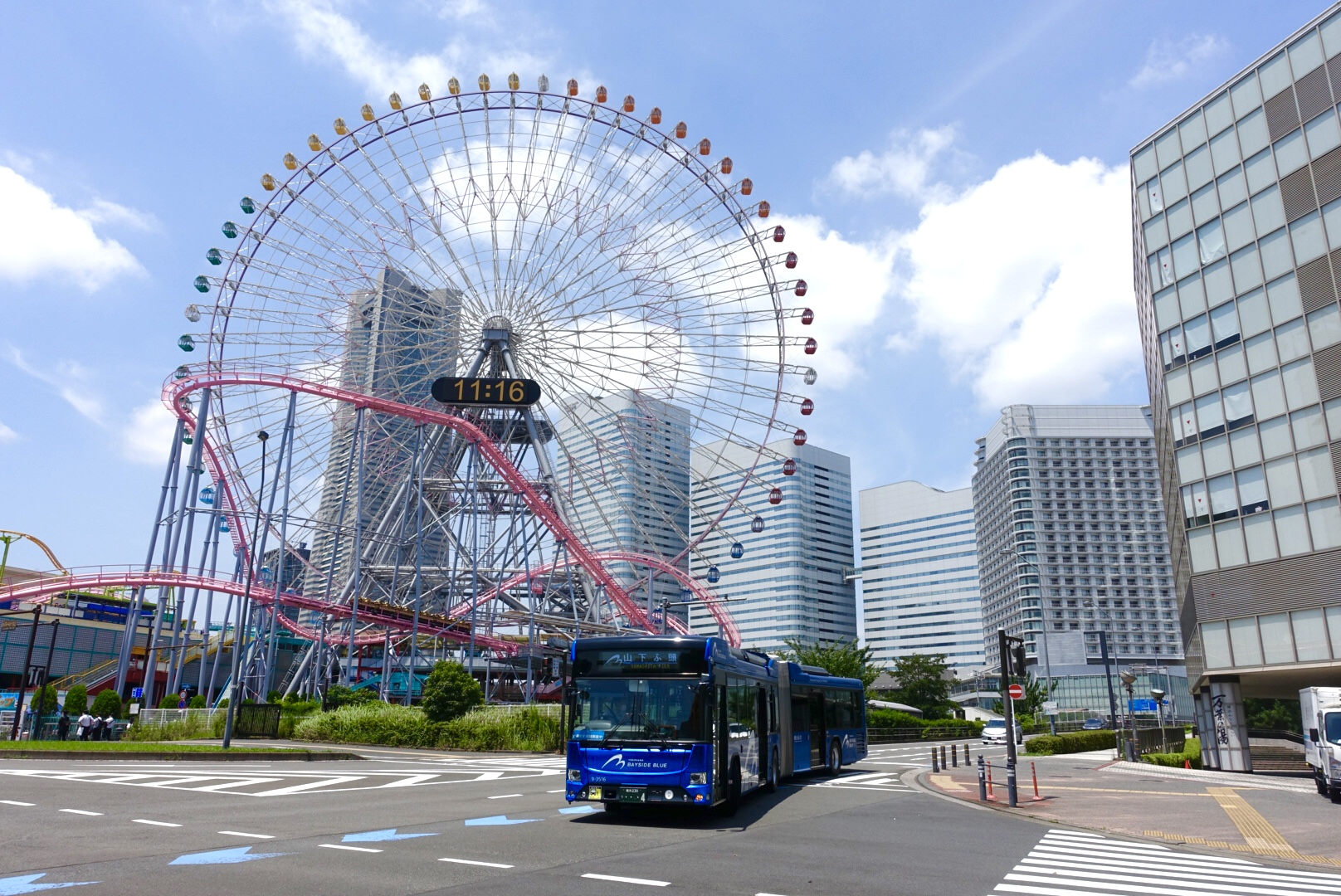
Passing Cosmo Clock 21

After crossing the Kokusai-bashi Bridge and passing major waterfront landmarks, including the Cosmo Clock 21 Ferris wheel, the route turns toward the waterfront via the CupNoodles Museum entrance. It makes a right turn under the Circle Walk Pedestrian Deck, crosses the Bankoku-bashi Bridge, and proceeds southeast along Kaigan-dori Avenue.

Along the Yamashita Park Avenue, the bus passes Yokohama Marine Tower before turning southwest. The return leg of the loop runs along Honcho-dori, passing alongside Yokohama Chinatown, and then continues to Minato-odori, passing the Kanagawa Prefectural Government Building (The King's Tower).

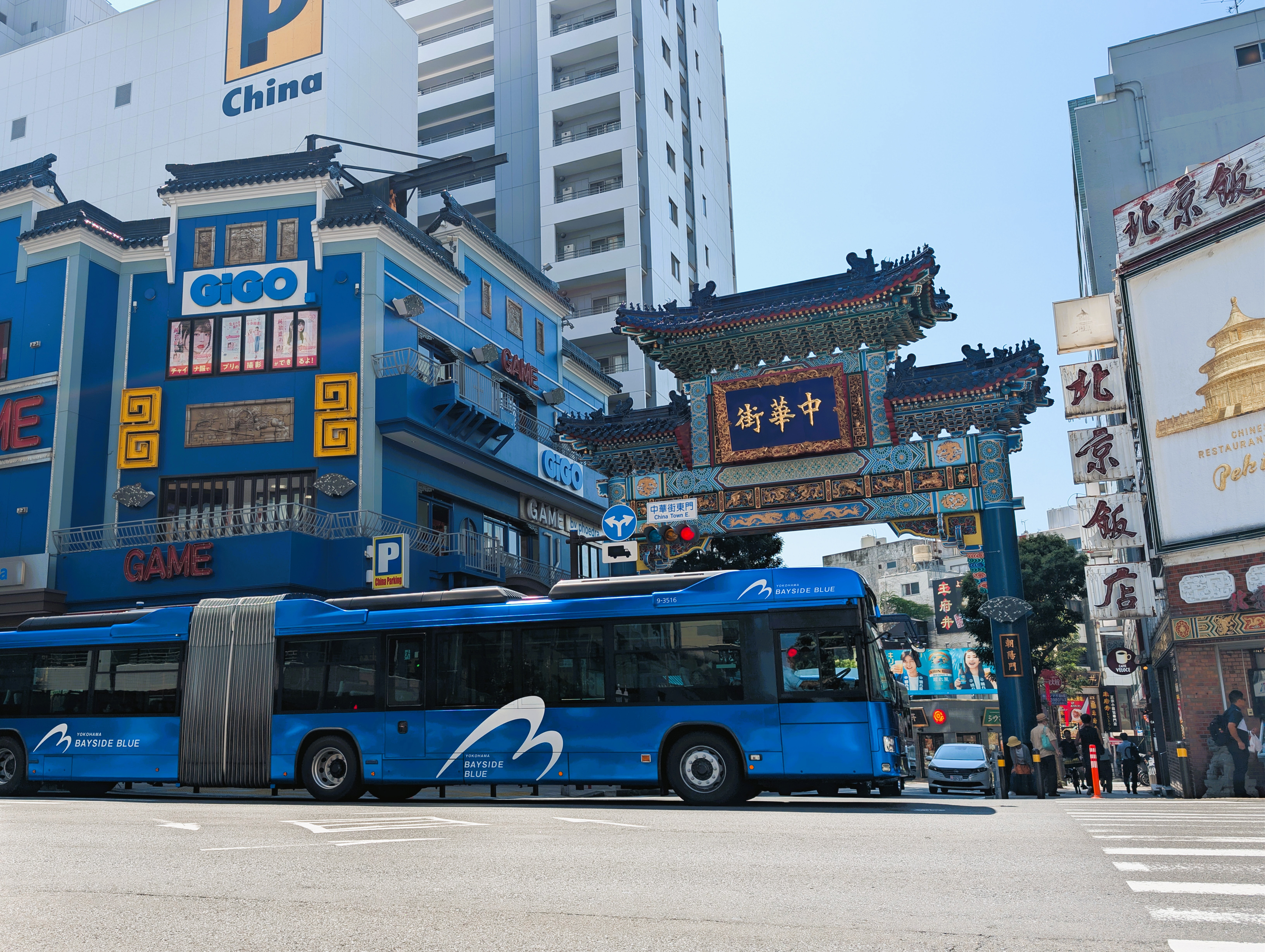
Passing by the Chinatown East Gate (Choyo-mon)

On its return journey, the route serves the Yokohama Red Brick Warehouse and the Yokohama Hammerhead International cruise Terminal. Following additional service stops at Pacifico Yokohama, the bus rejoins Kokusai-odori Boulevard and Tochinoki-dori Avenue. Finally, it merges back onto National Route 1, terminating in front of the Yokohama Station ticket gates.

=== Route characteristics ===
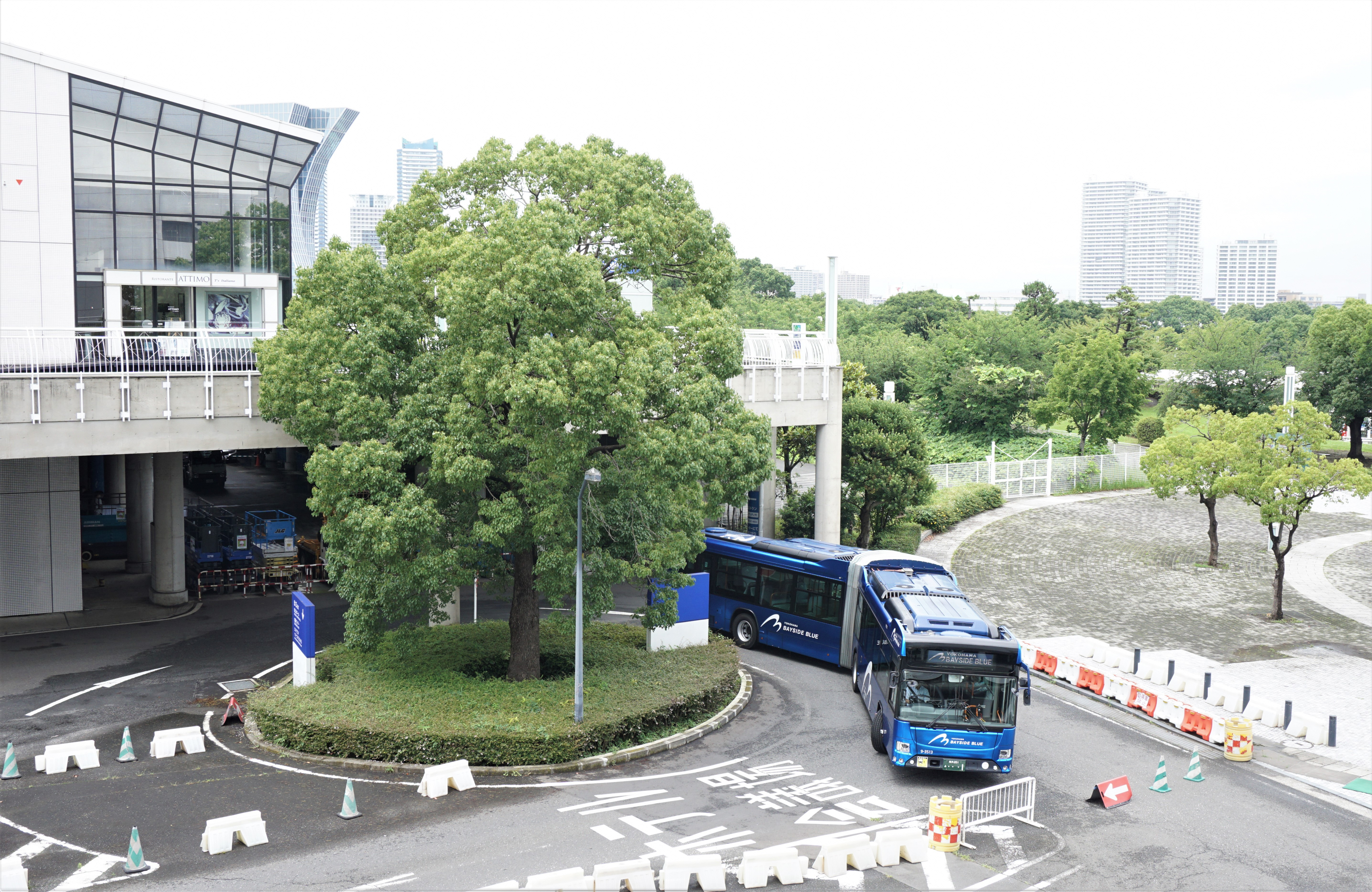
U-turn at Pacifico Yokohama. Also loops at Hammerhead and Pacifico Yokohama North.

As the route was designed to serve all major facilities in Yokohama's central waterfront area, it incorporates a large number of tight-radius U-turns and frequent left and right turns. According to officials of the Yokohama City Transportation Bureau, routes with such a high concentration of directional changes are uncommon among articulated bus services in other cities.

== Vehicles ==
Bayside Blue uses the Hino Blue Ribbon Hybrid articulated bus, a model jointly developed by Hino Motors and Isuzu Motors, and the first domestically developed articulated bus in Japan to be mass-produced. The Yokohama City Transportation Bureau stated that, based on its historical operation of a fleet mainly consisting of Hino and Isuzu vehicles, it regarded the new model as reliable.

To ensure compatibility with Japanese road conditions, the vehicle was designed to achieve maneuverability close to that of a conventional large transit bus. It requires a road width of 7.0 metres (23.0 ft) for turning movements and has a minimum turning radius of 9.7 metres (32 ft).

The front door is 1.0 metre (3 ft 3 in) wide, while the middle and rear doors are 1.2 metres (3 ft 11 in) wide. When the kneeling system is activated, the floor height at the entrance is reduced to 265 millimetres (10.4 in). Folding four seats in the front section allows the interior to accommodate and secure up to two wheelchairs simultaneously, and the centre door is equipped with a reversible manual ramp to speed up wheelchair boarding and securing.

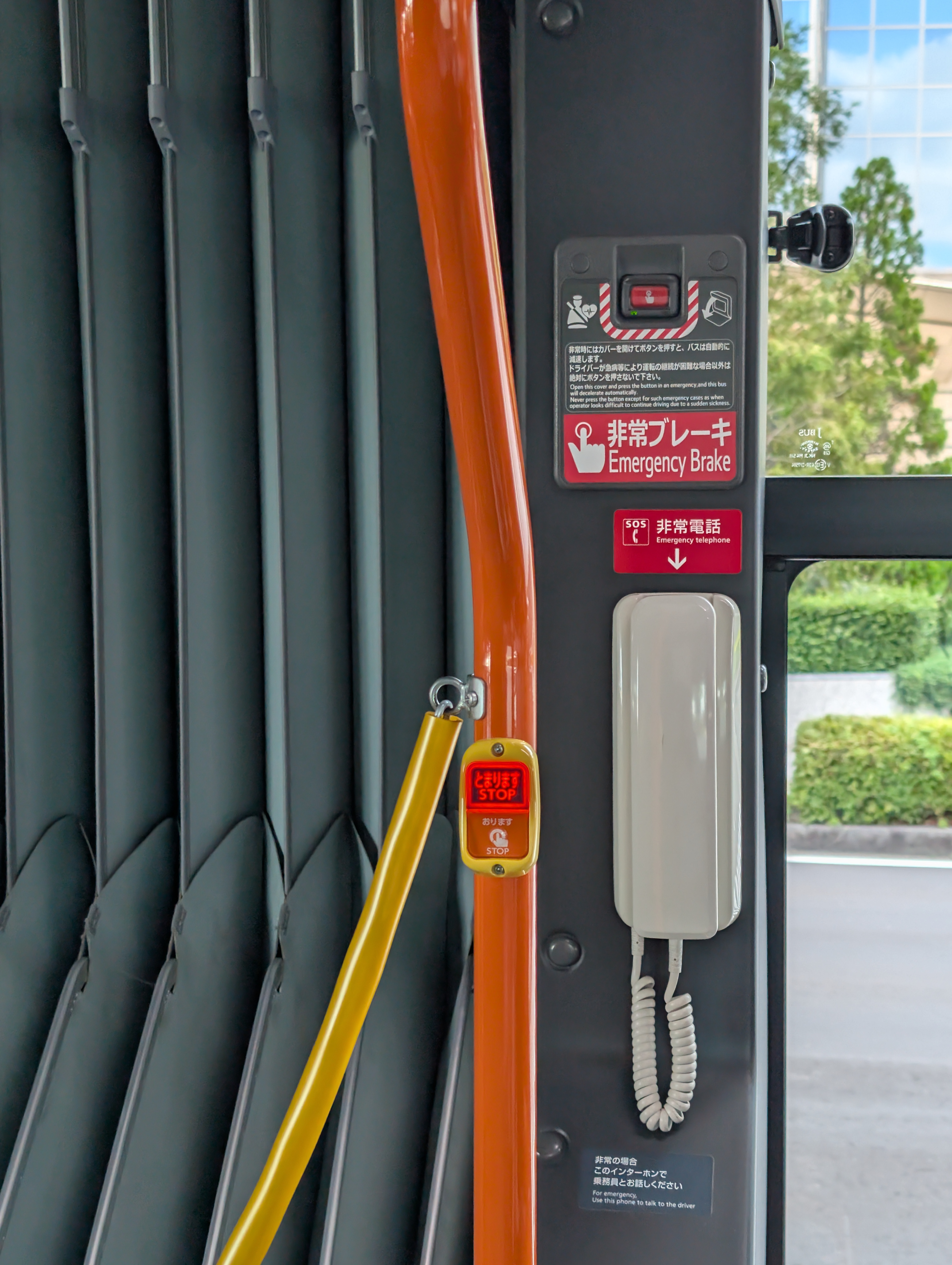
Emergency brake button and intercom in the trailing unit

For safety, the vehicles are equipped with an Emergency Driving Stop System (EDSS) as standard. When the emergency brake button is pressed, the system gradually decelerates over approximately 3.2 seconds to account for standing passengers, before applying full braking to bring the vehicle to a complete stop.

The vehicle exterior uses a specialized metal-vapor-deposited wrapping film instead of conventional paint. The rear interior features face-to-face box seating for four passengers, a layout partially differing from the manufacturer's standard catalog and representing a custom specification developed by the Yokohama City Transportation Bureau.

The base procurement cost of each vehicle was ¥88 million. With additional expenses for custom design, exterior wrapping, and advanced onboard passenger information systems, the total cost per unit was approximately ¥100 million. Of the total procurement cost of ¥400 million for the four vehicles, one half was subsidized by the national government, while one quarter was covered by the City of Yokohama.

== Design ==
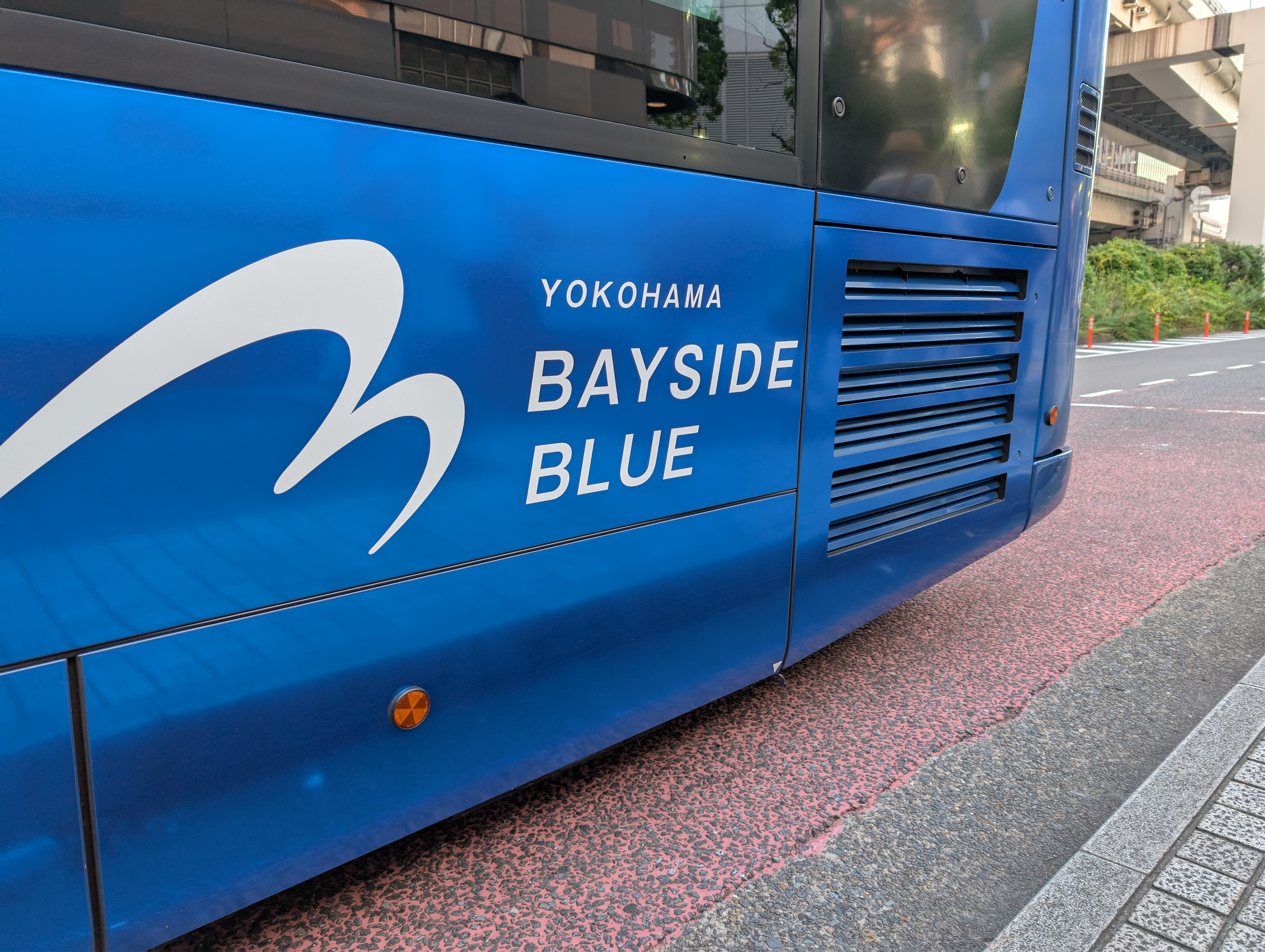
Bayside Blue logo on a matte metallic blue wrap

The visual identity of Bayside Blue was developed based on a "total design" concept, in which vehicles, bus stops, signage, and related facilities were designed under a unified aesthetic framework. The design was commissioned by the City of Yokohama and executed by GK Design Group, which was responsible for the exterior coloring of the vehicles, the service symbol mark, and the architectural design of the bus stops. The exterior livery adopts a distinctive matte metallic blue finish. The color was selected to reflect Yokohama's symbolic association with blue. A subtle metallic sheen was incorporated to evoke the reflective surface of the sea. A monochromatic color scheme was chosen to ensure visual clarity and to distinguish the service from standard municipal bus routes operating in the city.

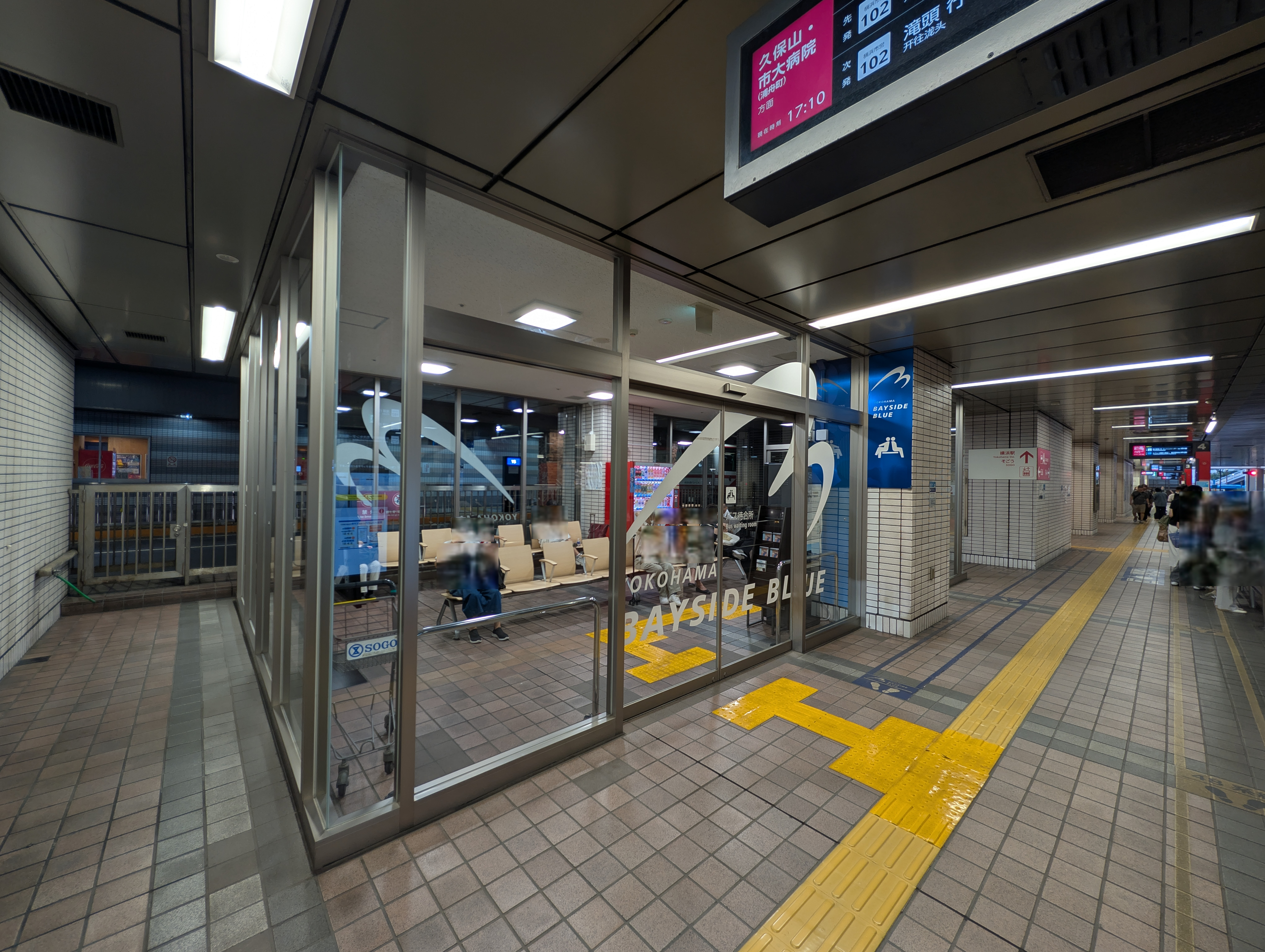
A dedicated bus shelter featuring a total design concept at the terminus

Rather than conventional paint, the vehicle exterior is finished using a specialized wrapping film with a metal vapor–deposited layer. This material produces variations in appearance depending on lighting conditions and viewing angles.

The service symbol mark, rendered in white against the blue background, represents the two articulated sections of the bus as flowing, wave-like forms. The symbol is applied consistently across vehicles, bus stops, and wayfinding signage.

Interior design elements were also customized for the service. The interior features a light gray color scheme with wood-grain flooring.

== Operations ==
=== Fare and ticketing ===
Bayside Blue operates a fleet of four dedicated articulated buses, with approximately two departures per hour between 9:00 and 19:00. The circular route consists of 15 stops over a distance of about 12.4 km, with a full loop taking 75 to 85 minutes.

Consistent with other Yokohama Municipal Bus services, the route operates under a flat-fare system. Since 6 November 2024, the service has participated in a full cashless bus pilot program and no longer accepts cash payments. Passengers can pay using contactless credit cards, certain QR code payment services, or major Japanese transportation IC cards.

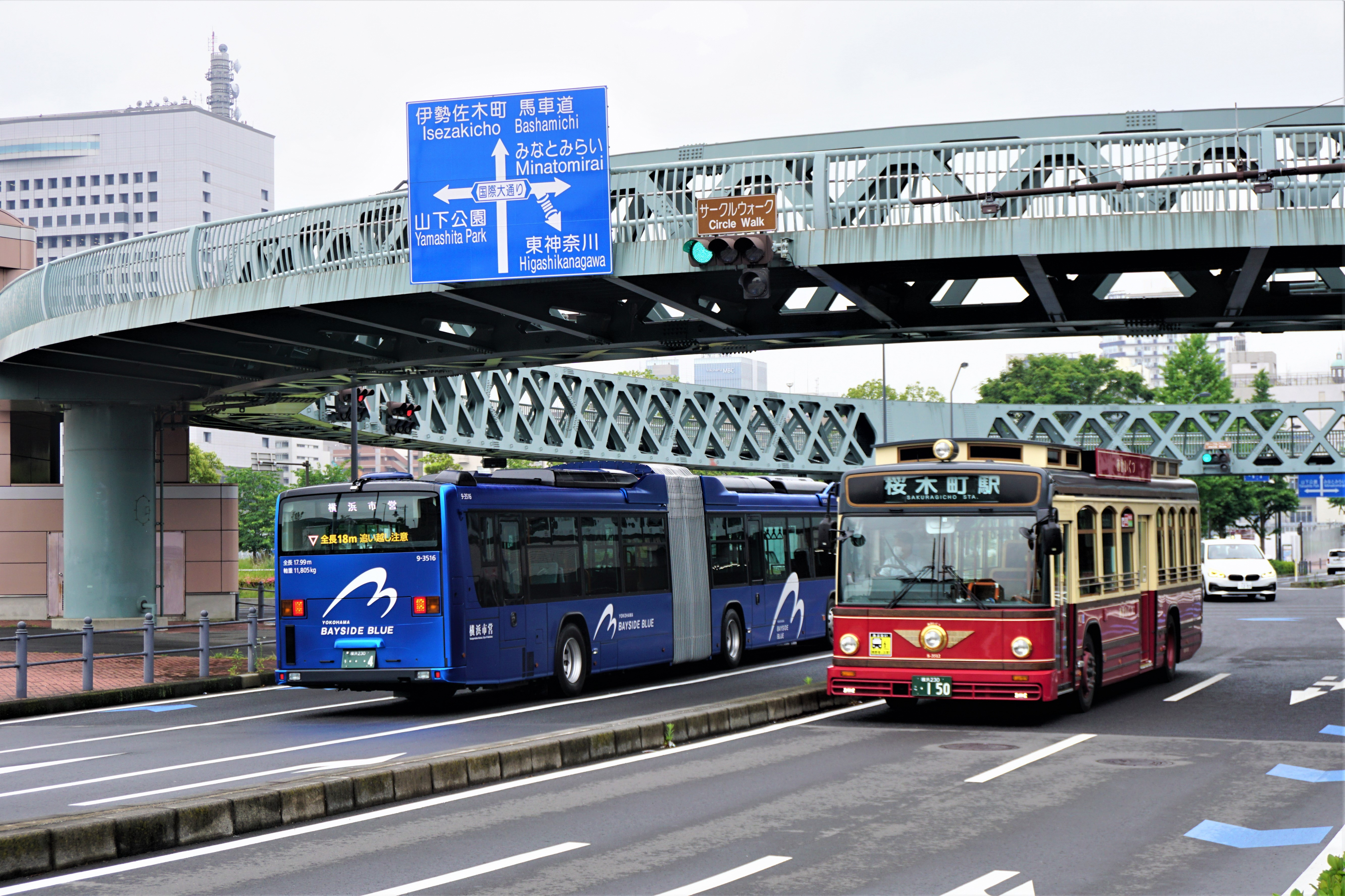
Bayside Blue and Akai Kutsu passing beneath the Circle Walk

In addition to single-ride fares, the Yokohama City Transportation Bureau issues the "Minato Burari Ticket", a one-day pass aimed at improving visitor circulation. The pass allows unlimited rides on Bayside Blue, Yokohama Municipal Bus and Subway services, as well as certain buses operated by other companies, within the designated area on the day of use.

=== Passenger information and accessibility ===
To accommodate international visitors, onboard announcements are provided in both Japanese and English. Digital passenger information displays in the vehicles and at selected stops provide real-time, multilingual guidance.

=== Operational framework and staffing ===
Bayside Blue is operated under an integrated public-sector framework, with the Yokohama City Transportation Bureau responsible for vehicle ownership, maintenance, and daily operations. Unlike many BRT projects in Japan, which adopt an "Vertical separation" model combining publicly owned infrastructure with private operators, the service is managed entirely by a single municipal operator. The Ministry of Land, Infrastructure, Transport and Tourism has highlighted this framework as a feature that allows the public sector to provide service levels meeting its own objectives.

As Yokohama's first articulated bus service, the introduction of Bayside Blue required coordinated preparations across multiple technical and administrative fields. Road infrastructure modifications were implemented jointly by the Urban Development Bureau, the Road and Highway Bureau, and the Port and Harbor Bureau to accommodate the 18-metre articulated buses. These measures included widening roadways at tight curves, relocating stop lines at intersections to prevent conflicts during turns, and extending bus bays at designated stops. The service operates entirely on public roads shared with general traffic and does not use dedicated bus lanes.

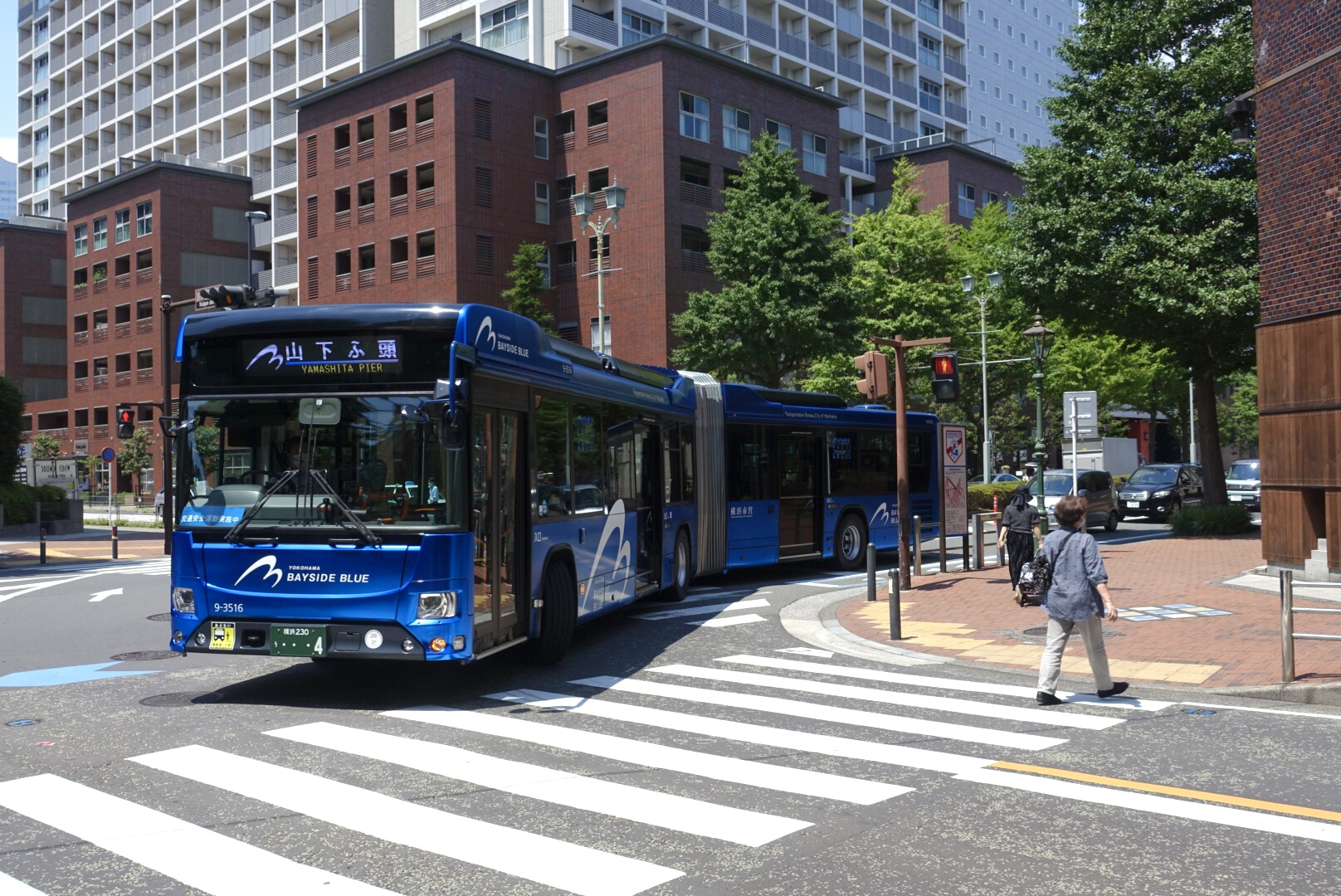
The sharpest intersection on the route

Under Japan's Road Traffic Act, the maximum vehicle length permitted on public roads is 12 metres (39 ft), requiring articulated buses to obtain a Special Vehicle Passage Permit from the relevant road administrators. For Bayside Blue, a special exemption was granted by the Ministry of Land, Infrastructure, Transport and Tourism, allowing the operation of over-length vehicles along the designated route.

=== Driver training ===
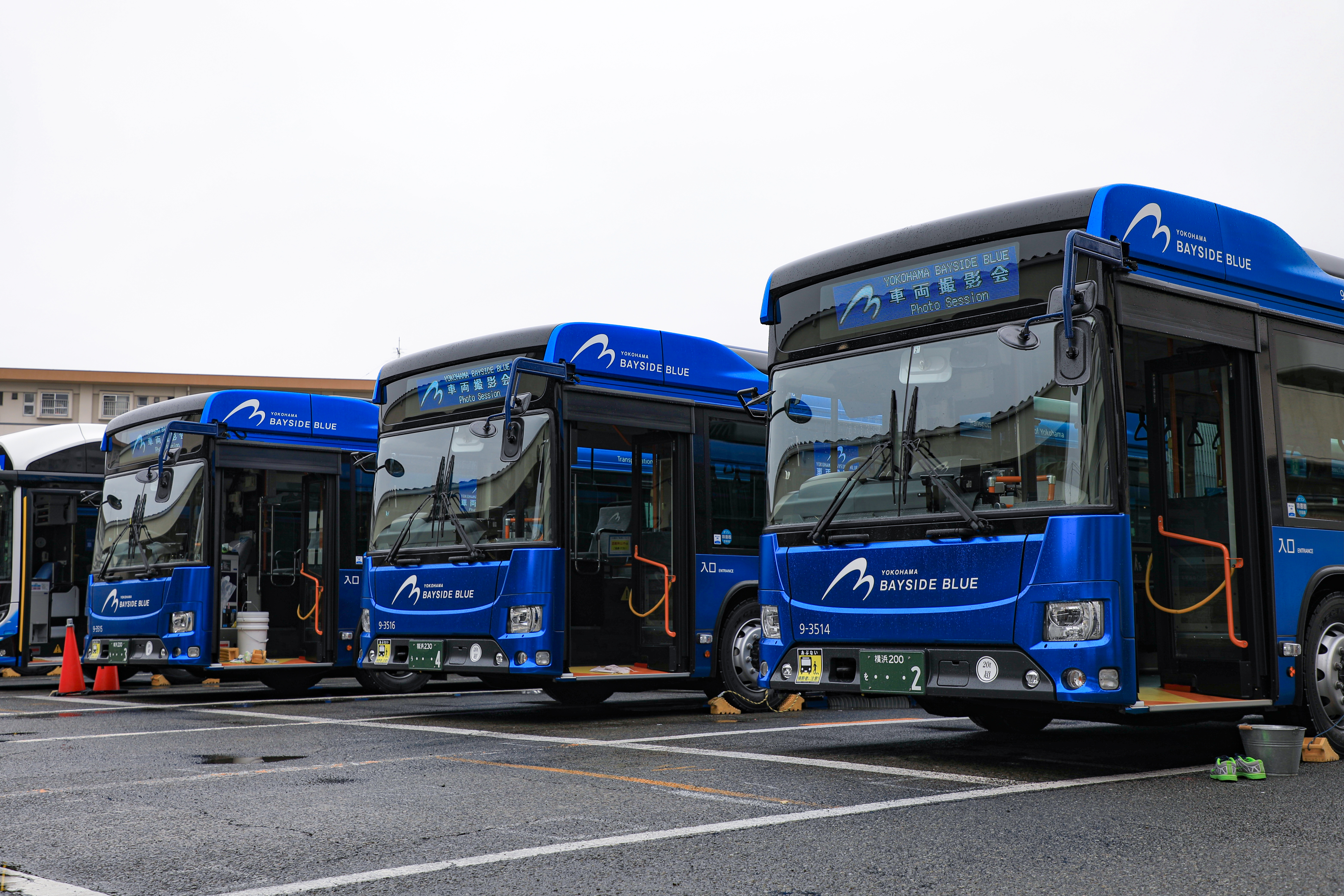
Lined up at Takigashira Depot. Taken at the Bureau-hosted photo event.

In Japan, articulated buses can be operated with the same large-vehicle driving licence required for conventional buses. However, because of their greater overall length and articulated structure, they are more difficult to control and require specialised driving skills.

For Bayside Blue, the Yokohama City Transportation Bureau conducted an internal recruitment process open to all 1,100 of its bus drivers. From the applicants, 22 drivers were selected based on various criteria, including customer service skills. The recruitment distinguished between regular drivers and experienced instructors, with the instructors receiving training in advance and subsequently passing on their driving techniques to other drivers.

Five instructors were selected and received training at Hino Motors’ driver training centre using test vehicles, and also observed training programmes of the Nishitetsu Group in Fukuoka Prefecture, which has extensive experience in articulated bus operations. After the buses were delivered in February, further training was conducted at depots, at Yamashita Pier, and on the actual service route prior to the start of commercial operations.

=== Maintenance and mechanic training ===
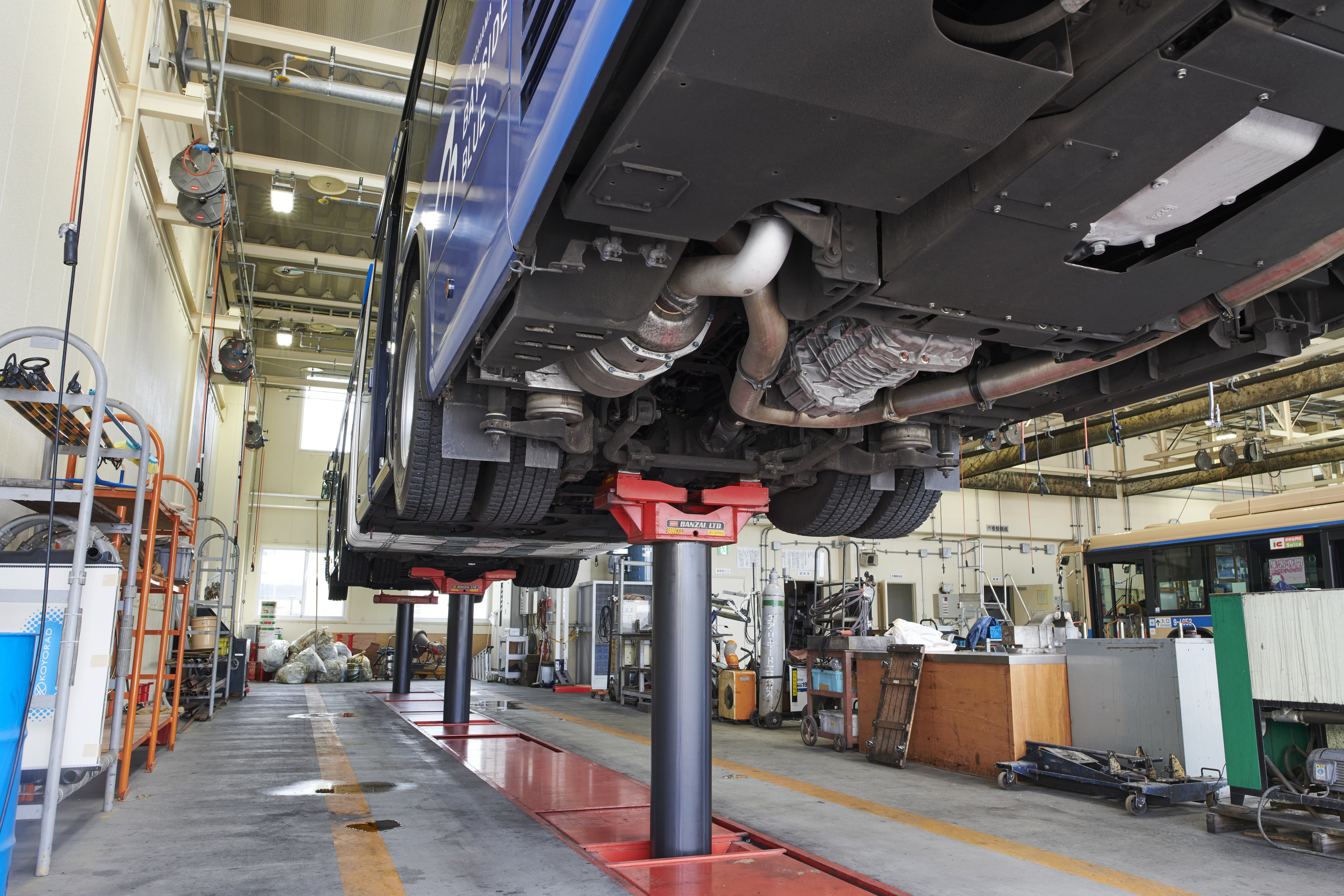
Three-post lift at Takigashira Depot

As articulated buses were newly introduced to Yokohama, specialized maintenance systems and training programs were established. Vehicle maintenance for Bayside Blue is carried out at the Takigashira Depot, where the workshop was rebuilt in 2019 and equipped with a triple-post lift capable of supporting long-body vehicles. In addition, Yokohama Hino Motors opened its Sachiura Factory in 2020, located approximately five kilometres from the depot. The facility features Japan's first lift specifically designed for articulated buses, allowing the vehicle to be lowered for safer roof access.

Mechanics also received driving training to familiarize themselves with articulated bus handling. Maintenance training sessions were held at Hino Motors' Training Centre, with participants including staff from the Yokohama City Transportation Bureau, Yokohama Hino Motors, and Hino Motors. The curriculum combined classroom instruction on differences from conventional buses with hands-on practical training using test vehicles.

== Operating results ==
Fiscal year	Revenue (k¥)	Expenditure (k¥)	Balance (k¥)	Operating ratio	Passengers per day	Ref.
2020	28508	62034	−33526	217.6	469	
2021	41890	80449	−38559	192.0	644	
2022	60965	80314	−19349	131.7	894	
2023	79683	89077	−9349	111.8	1123	
2024	66425	102523	−36098	154.3	1028	

== See also ==
- Yokohama Air Cabin
