= Sun wheel =

Sun wheel or solar wheel may refer to:

- Various solar symbols, including:
  - Black Sun (symbol), a type of sun wheel symbol originating in Nazi Germany and later employed by neo-Nazis and other far-right individuals and groups
  - Sun cross, a solar symbol consisting of an equilateral cross inside a circle
  - Swastika, a symbol used in various Eurasian religions and cultures, as well as a few African and American cultures
- Sun Wheel (Da Nang), a Ferris wheel in Da Nang, Vietnam
- Component of an epicyclic gearing system
- Former name of Pixar Pal-A-Round, a Ferris wheel in Anaheim, California, United States
