= Senyo Kogyo =

Japanese entertainment company

Senyo Kogyo Co., Ltd

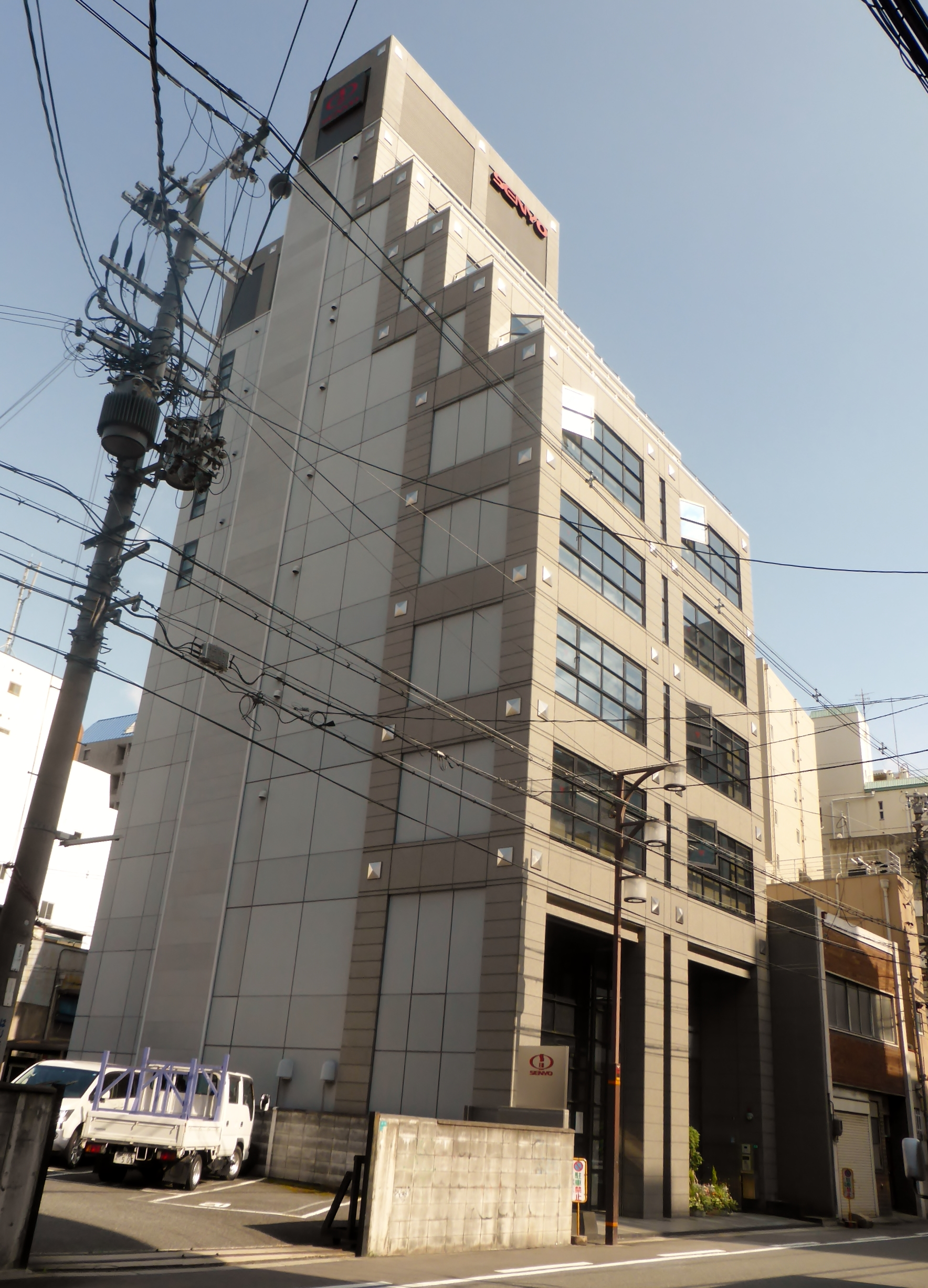
- The Senyo Kogyo headquarters in Osaka, Japan
- Industry: Amusement Ride Manufacturing, Amusement Park Operator
- Headquarters: Osaka, Japan
- Area served: Japan (mostly)
- Website: www.senyo.co.jp

Senyo Kogyo is a Japanese entertainment company headquartered in Osaka, Japan, specializing in the production and operation of amusement park equipment. The company is known for manufacturing Ferris wheels.

The company also owns and operates the theme park Yokohama Cosmo World in Yokohama, Kanagawa. The park features two rides built by themselves: Cosmo Clock 21 and Diving Coaster: Vanish! (see below for more info on these rides).

== Ferris wheels ==
- Cosmo Clock 21: 107.5 m (353 ft) tall, completed 1989; world's tallest from 1989 to 1997; 112.5 m (369 ft) tall when re-erected in 1999
- Diamond and Flower Ferris Wheel: 117 m (384 ft) tall, the world's second tallest when completed in 2001
- Tempozan Ferris Wheel: 112.5 m (369 ft) tall, completed 1997; world's tallest from 1997 to 1999

== Other attractions ==
- Diving Coaster: Vanish!: a 35 m (115 ft) tall rollercoaster operating since 1999. Not be confused with B&M's dive coaster model
