= Cosmo Clock 21 =

Ferris wheel in Yokohama, Japan

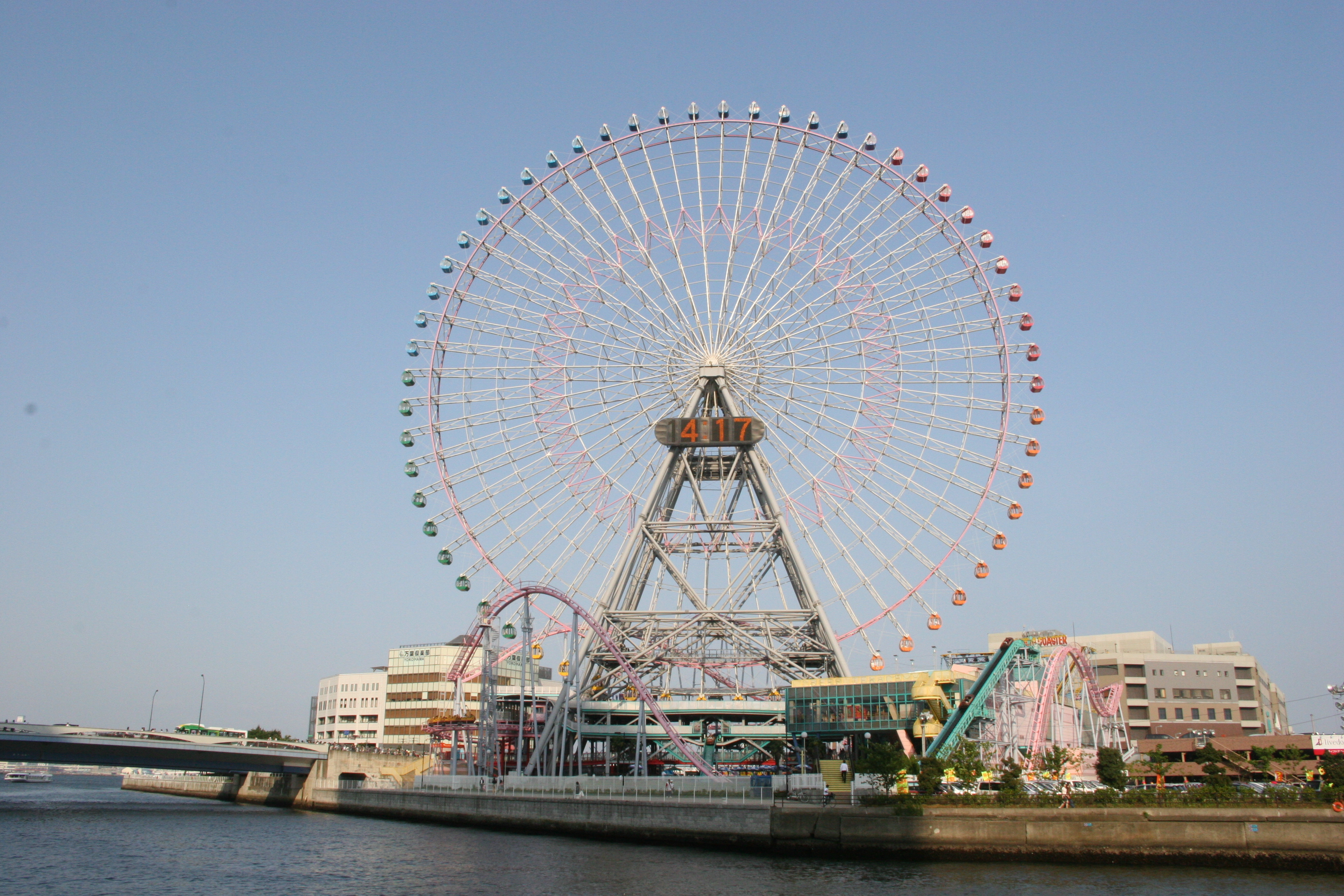
Cosmo Clock 21

Cosmo Clock 21 (コスモクロック21) is a 112.5-metre-tall (369 ft) Ferris wheel at the Cosmo World amusement park in the Minato Mirai 21 district of Yokohama, Japan. When it first opened, it was the world's tallest Ferris wheel at 107.5 metres (353 ft), until the completion of the 108-metre (354 ft) Igosu 108 in Shiga, Japan, in 1992.

== History and specifications ==
Built for the YES '89 Yokohama Exposition at Minato Mirai 21 in 1989, Cosmo Clock 21 was originally constructed with a height of 107.5 metres (353 ft).

In 1997 the structure was dismantled, then in 1999 relocated onto a taller base which increased its overall height to 112.5 metres (369 ft).

Cosmo Clock 21 has 60 passenger cars, each capable of carrying up to eight people. One rotation of the 100-metre (330 ft) diameter wheel takes 15 minutes.

== In popular culture ==
Cosmo Clock 21 makes a prominent film appearances in Godzilla films:

- In the 1992 film Godzilla vs. Mothra, where Godzilla attempts to kill Mothra by toppling it on top of her, only for Battra to catch the wheel and use it as a weapon against Godzilla.
- Cosmo Clock 21 is seen in the 2001 film Godzilla, Mothra and King Ghidorah: Giant Monsters All-Out Attack during the final battle between Godzilla, Mothra and King Ghidorah.

== Coordinates ==
- 1st (107.5 m tall) installation, completed 1989, dismantled 1997: ?
- 2nd (112.5 m tall) installation, completed 1999: 35.4553872°N 139.6367347°E

== Gallery ==
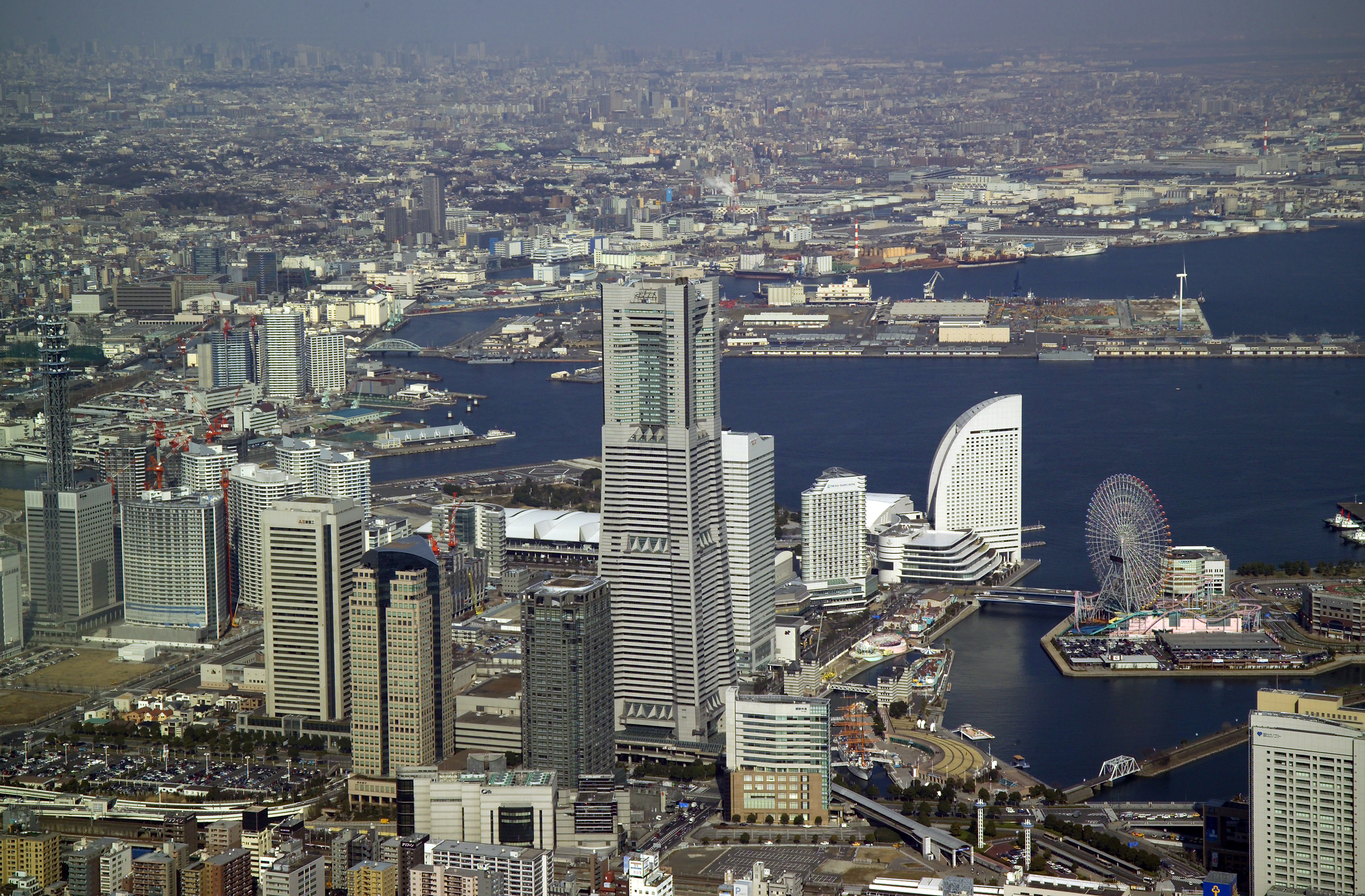

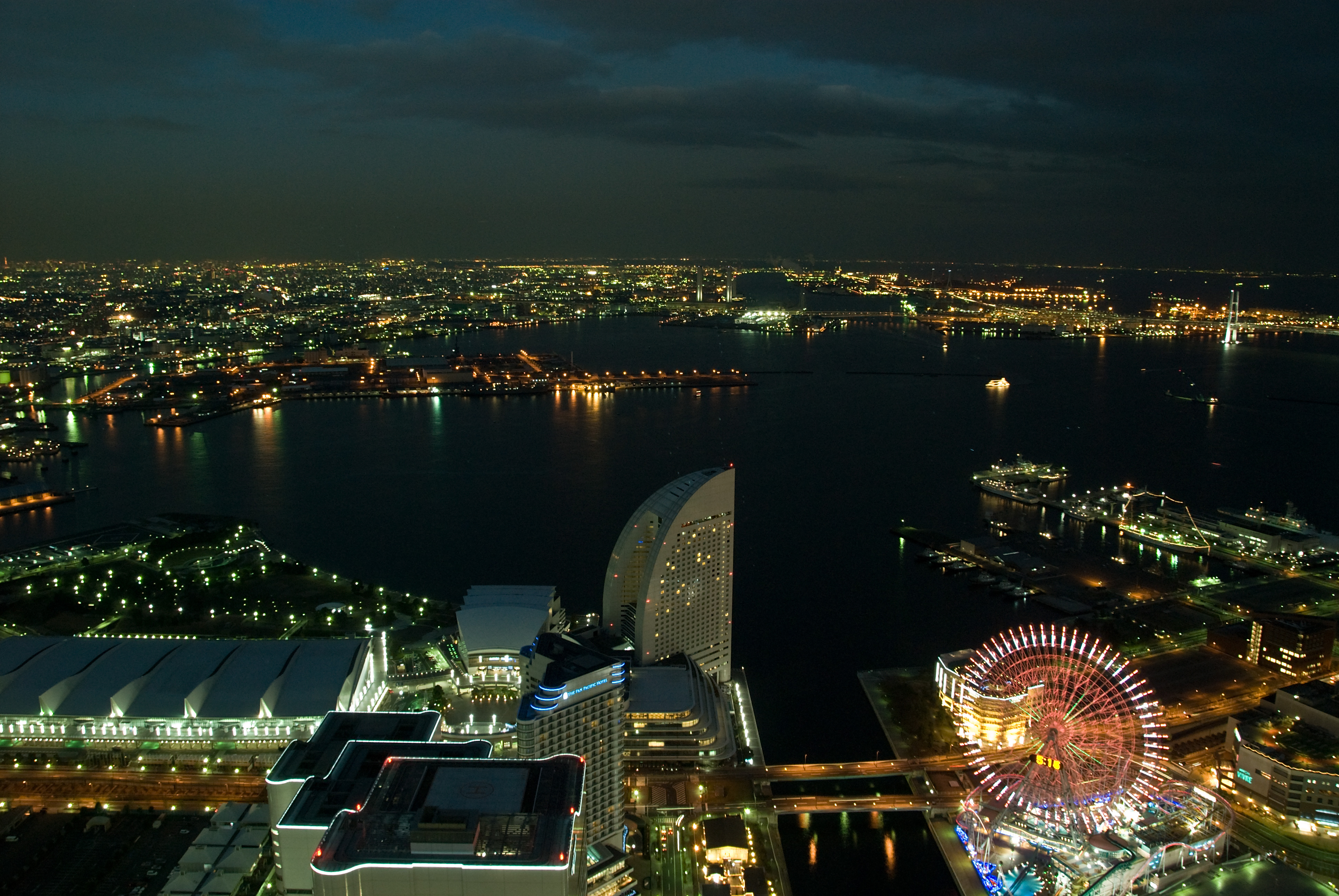

In 2009

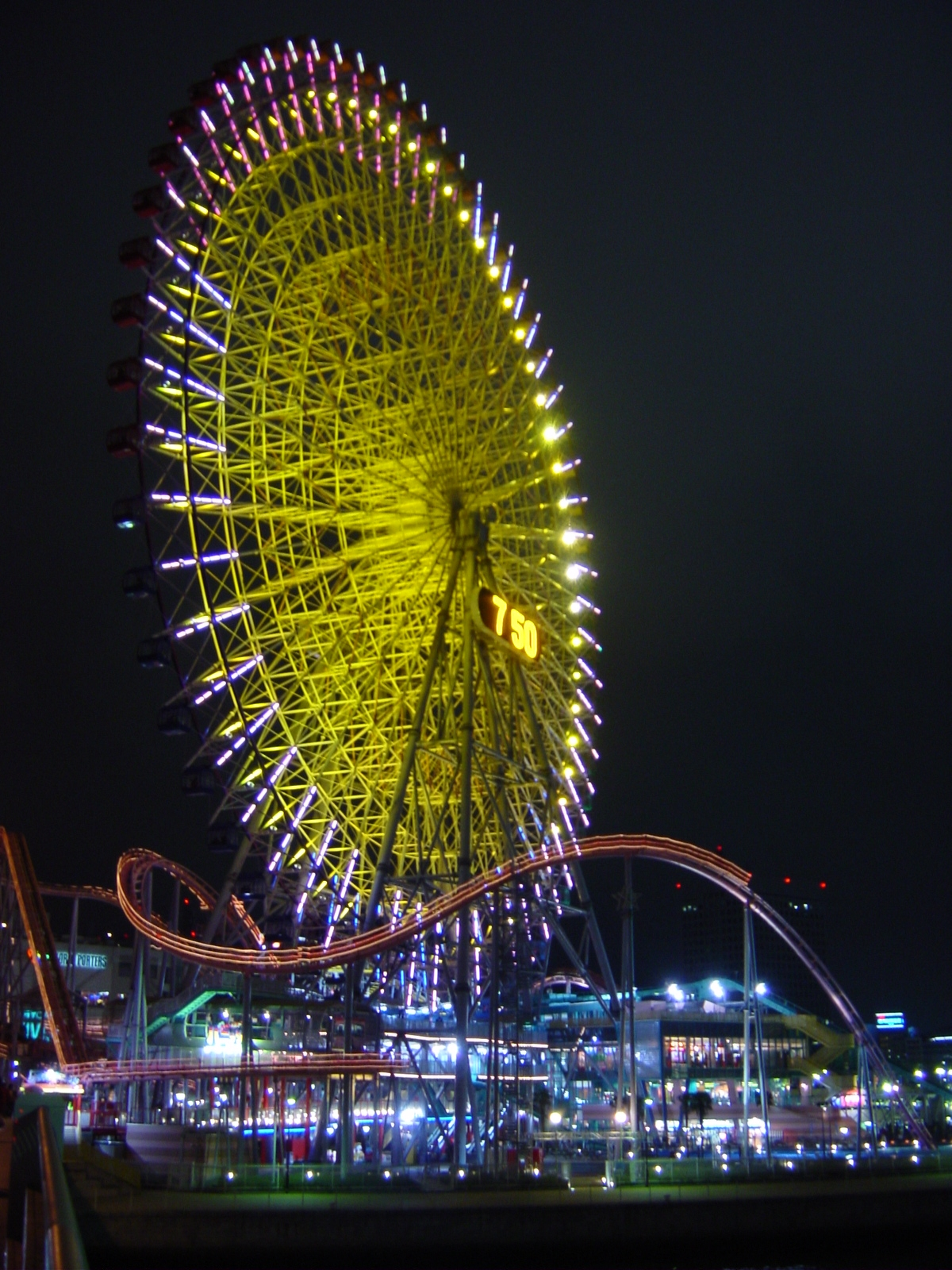

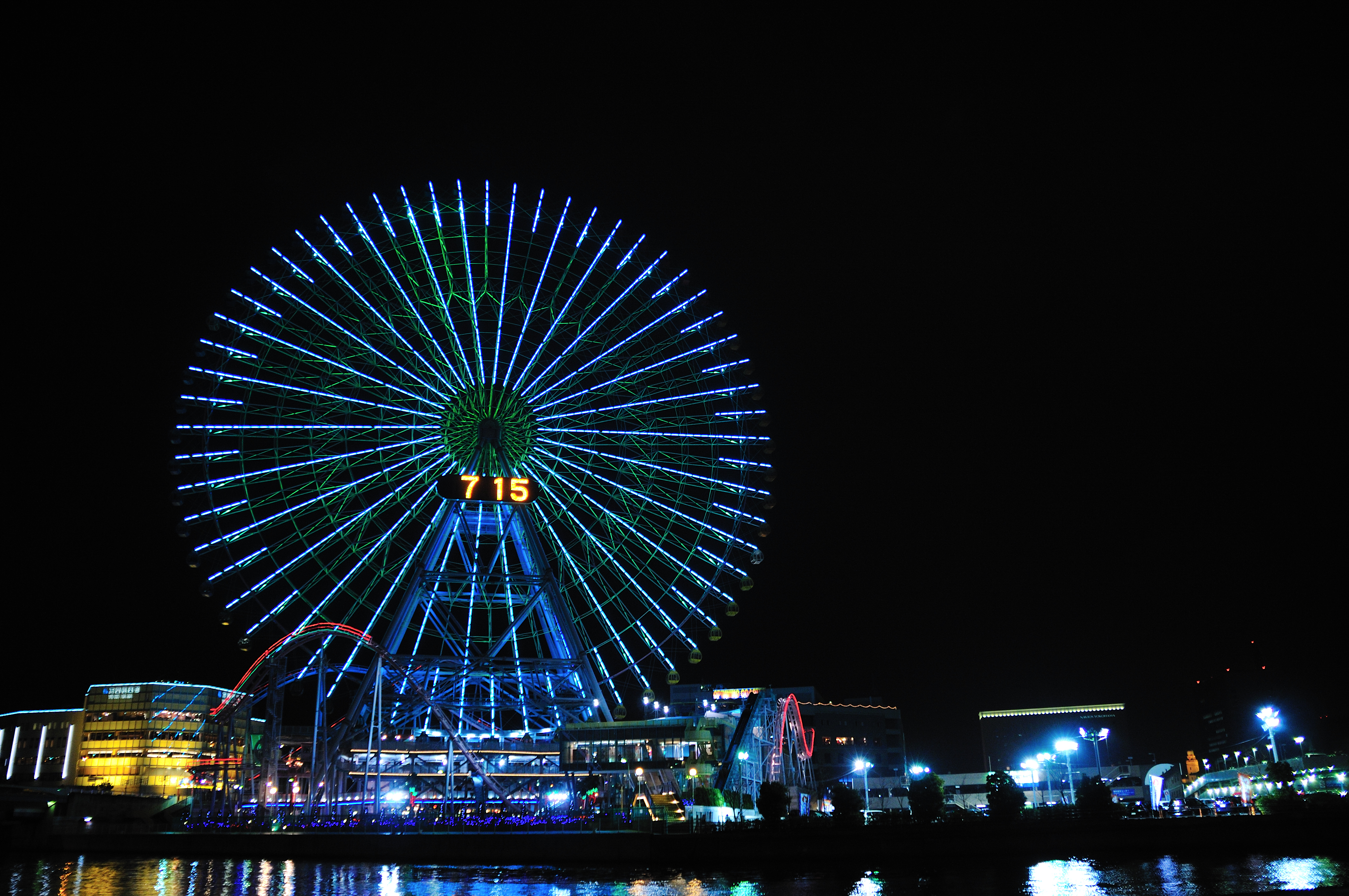

Preceded by Grande Roue de Paris	World's all-time tallest Ferris wheel 1989–1992	Succeeded by Igosu 108
Preceded by Technocosmos	World's tallest extant Ferris wheel 1989–1992	Succeeded by Igosu 108
