= Pacifico Yokohama =

Convention center in Japan

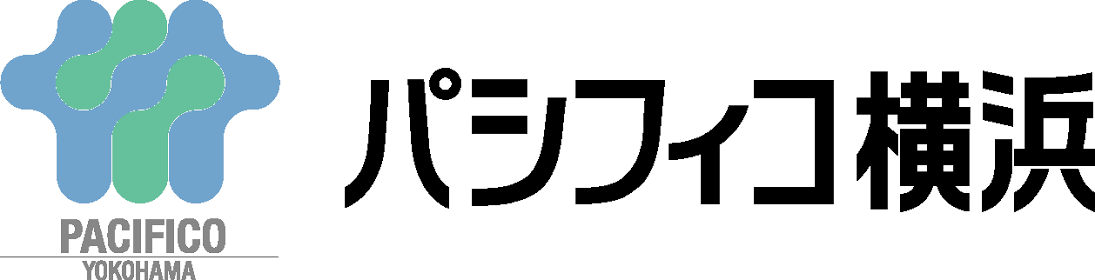

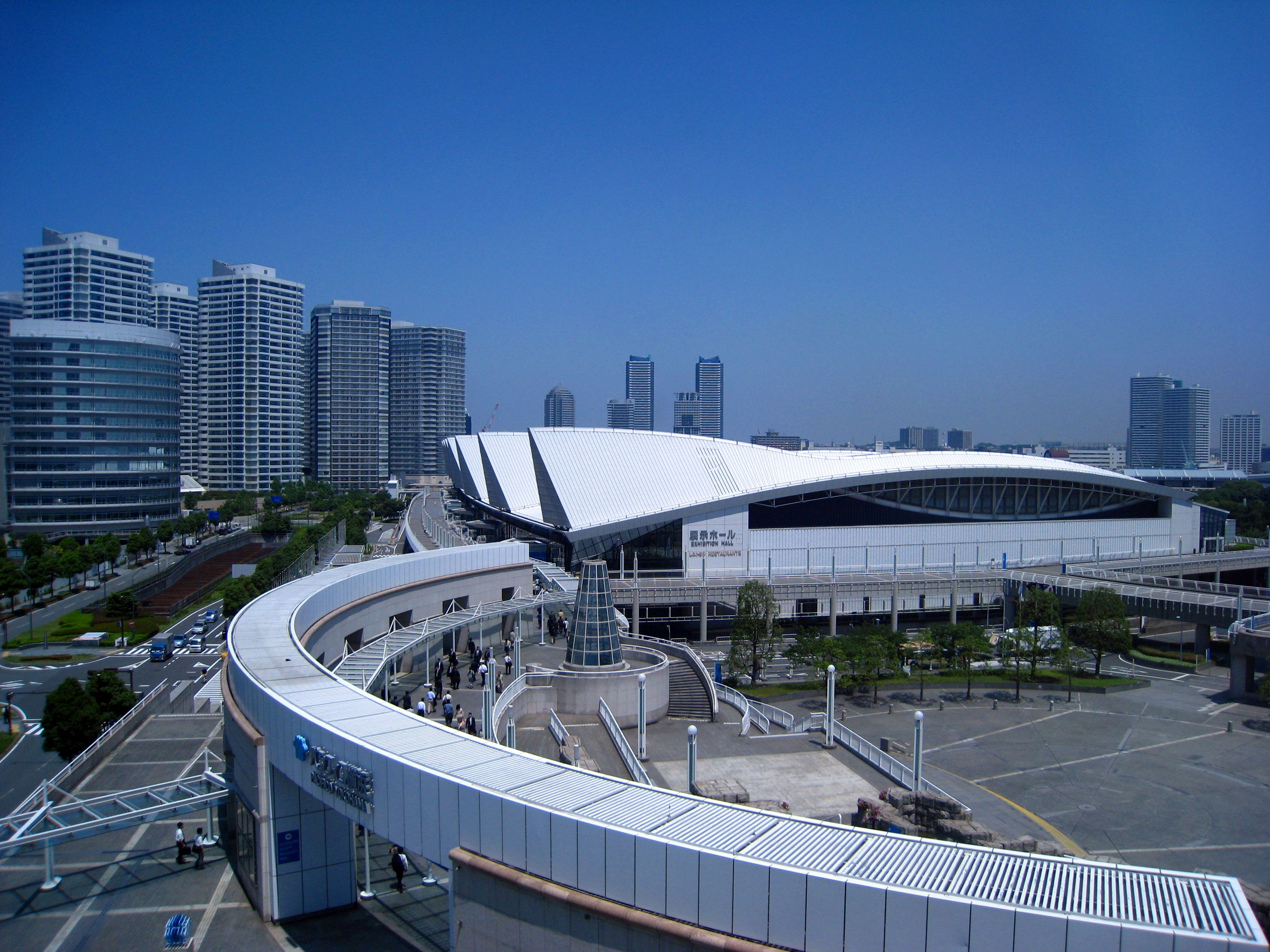
- Pacifico Yokohama exhibition hall
- Interactive map of Pacifico Yokohama
- Address: 1-1-1, Minato Mirai,
- Location: Nishi-ku, Yokohama, Kanagawa, Japan
- Coordinates: 35°27′30″N 139°38′11″E
- Owner: City of Yokohama, Pacific Convention Plaza Yokohama Inc., Government of Japan (Ministry of Finance), Yokohama City Construction Finance Corporation
- Operator: Pacific Convention Plaza Yokohama Inc.
- Capacity: 1,000 (Annex); 3,024 (North); 5,002 (National Convention Hall)
- Public transit: Minatomirai Station

Construction
- Built: December 1988 - 30 July 2001
- Opened: 22 August 1991
- Renovated: 23 March 2010 (the Conference Center)
- Expanded: 24 April 2020 (Pacifico Yokohama North)

Website
- www.pacifico.co.jp/english/

Pacifico Yokohama (パシフィコ横浜, Pashifiko Yokohama), officially known as Pacific Convention Plaza Yokohama (横浜国際平和会議場, Yokohama kokusai heiwa kaigijō), is a convention and exhibition center in Nishi-ku, Yokohama, Kanagawa, Japan. The center located in the western tip of waterfront Minato Mirai 21 district is one of the largest MICE venues in the nation.

The Conference Center and Yokohama Grand InterContinental Hotel were completed first on July 29, 1991 with the Exhibition Hall subsequently completed on October 12. On April 25, 1994, National Convention Hall of Yokohama was completed. In 2001 it was designated the main press centre for the 2002 FIFA World Cup and the Exhibition Hall was expanded.

A major expansion, called Pacifico Yokohama North (officially known as the Yokohama Minato Mirai International Convention Center), opened on April 24, 2020. The first floor includes a multipurpose hall that is approximately 6,300 square metres (68,000 ft^{2}) in area, which can be divided into eight sections and has a maximum capacity of approximately 6,000 people. The three floors above contain 42 conference rooms of varying sizes totaling 6,185 square metres (66,570 ft^{2}).

The word "Pacifico" which stands for "Pacific" is derived from the Latin "pacificus" ("peace" in English), primarily meaning "peaceful" or "quiet". Pacifico Yokohama is also used as a music venue.

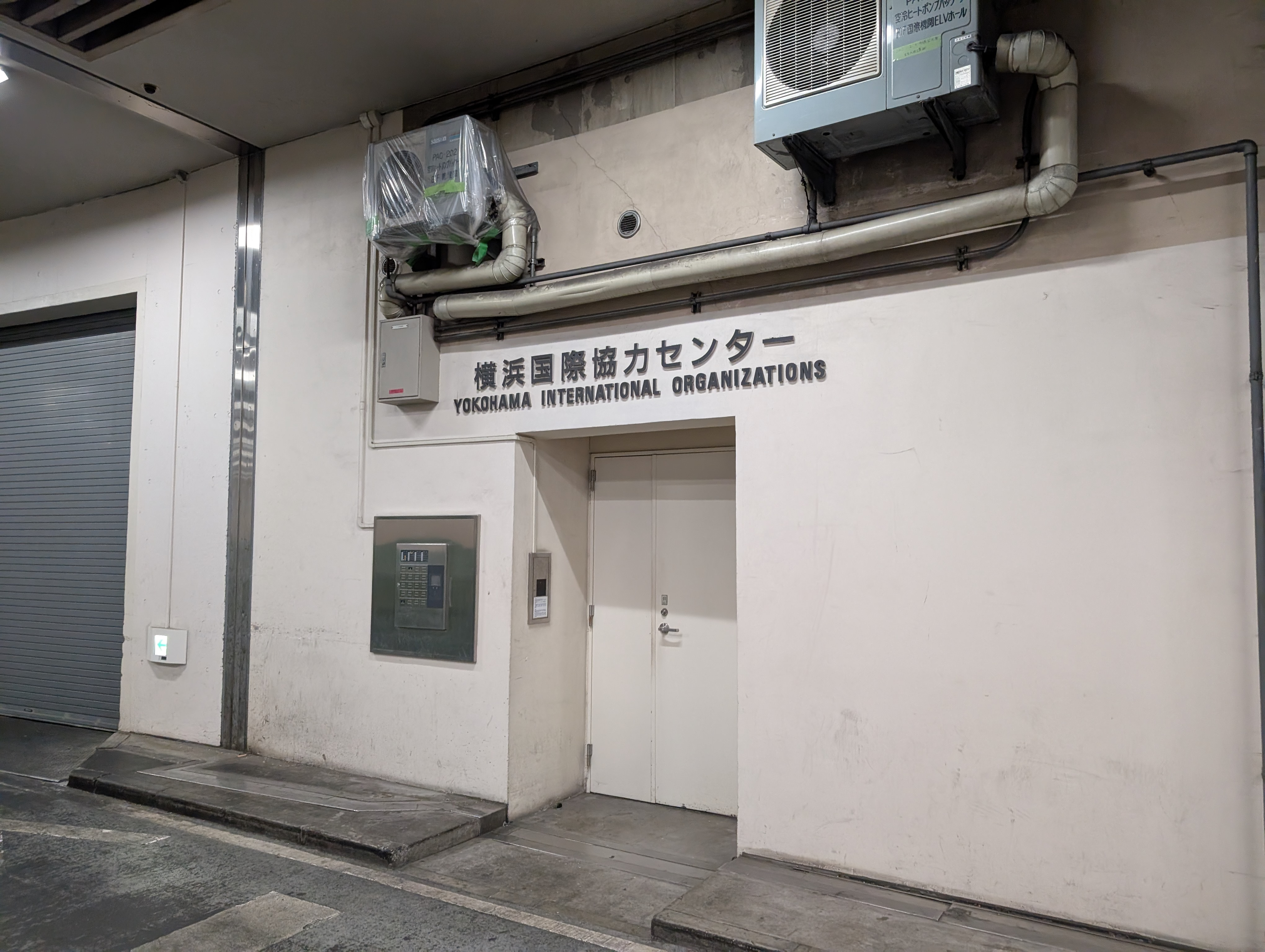
Yokohama international organizations

Pacifico Yokohama hosts the Japan branches of several international cooperation organizations such as ITTO, WFP, FAO, IFAD.

A renovation for the National Convention Hall will begin in May 2027.

== Past events ==
- 2007 Worldcon (65th World Science Fiction Convention)
- 2008 World Robot Olympiad
- 2008 Tokyo International Conference on African Development
- 2009 SIGGRAPH
- 2010 Asia-Pacific Economic Cooperation (APEC Japan 2010)
- 2012 Type-Moon Fes.
- 2012 Pikachu the Live 2012
- 2017 Kishidan 20th anniversary performance "Coming of Age Ceremony - YOKOHAMA Twenty Years Old -" (氣志團結成二十周年記念公演 「成人式～YOKOHAMA二十才ごえ～」)
- 2019 Fanmeeting: SONE Japan presents - Taeyeon's Atelier-
- 2023 Kara 15th Anniversary Fan Meeting 2023 ～Move Again～
- 2023 Pokémon World Championships
- 2024 Pokémon Japan National Championships
