= Yokohama Cosmo World =

Theme park in Yokohama, Japan

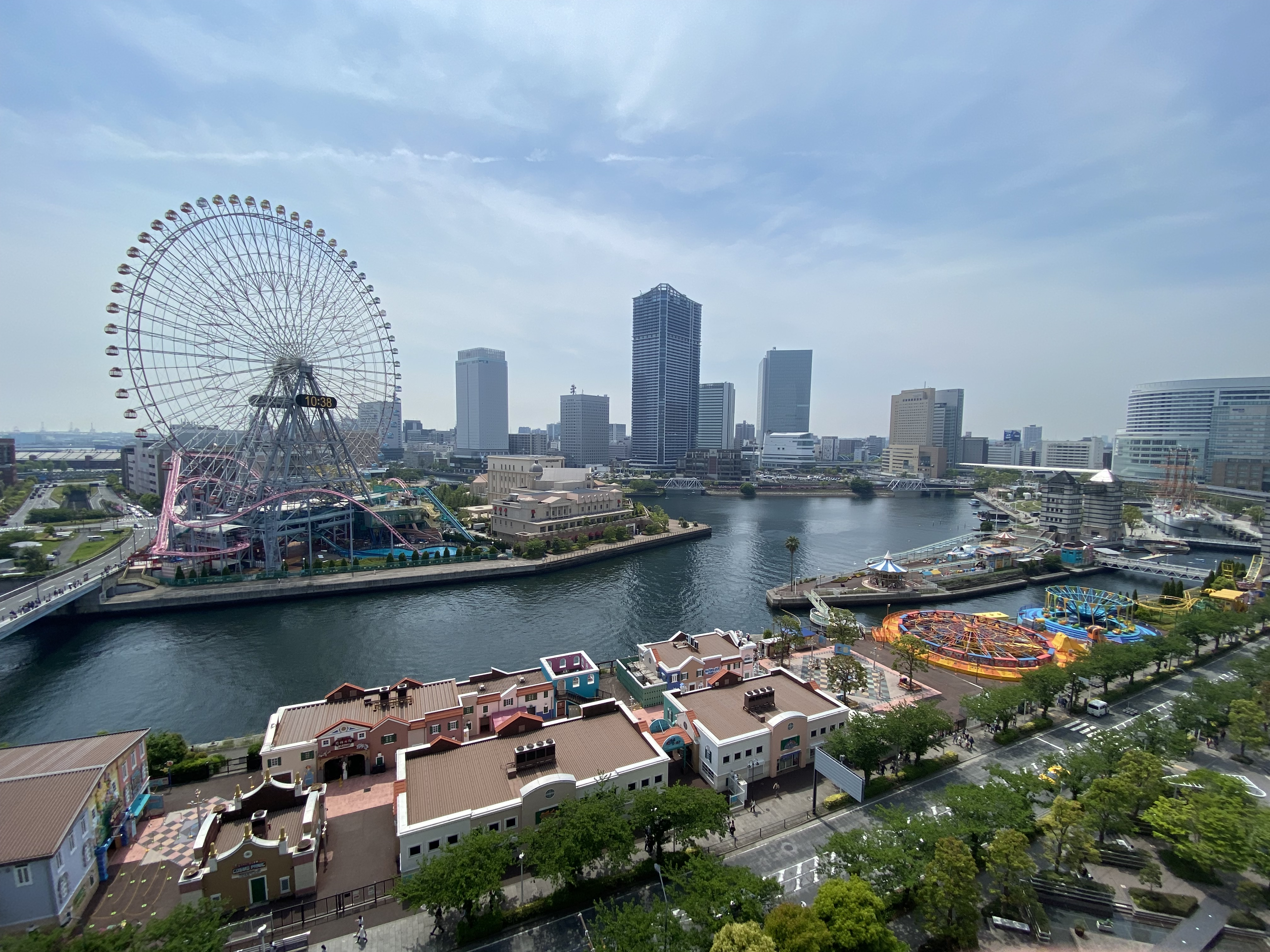
- Cosmo World in 2022
- Interactive map of Yokohama Cosmo World
- Location: Yokohama, Kanagawa Prefecture, Japan
- Coordinates: 35°27′19″N 139°38′12″E
- Status: Operating
- Opened: August 11, 1990
- Owner: Senyo Kogyo

Attractions
- Total: 31 (2023)
- Roller coasters: 3 (2023)
- Website: http://cosmoworld.jp/

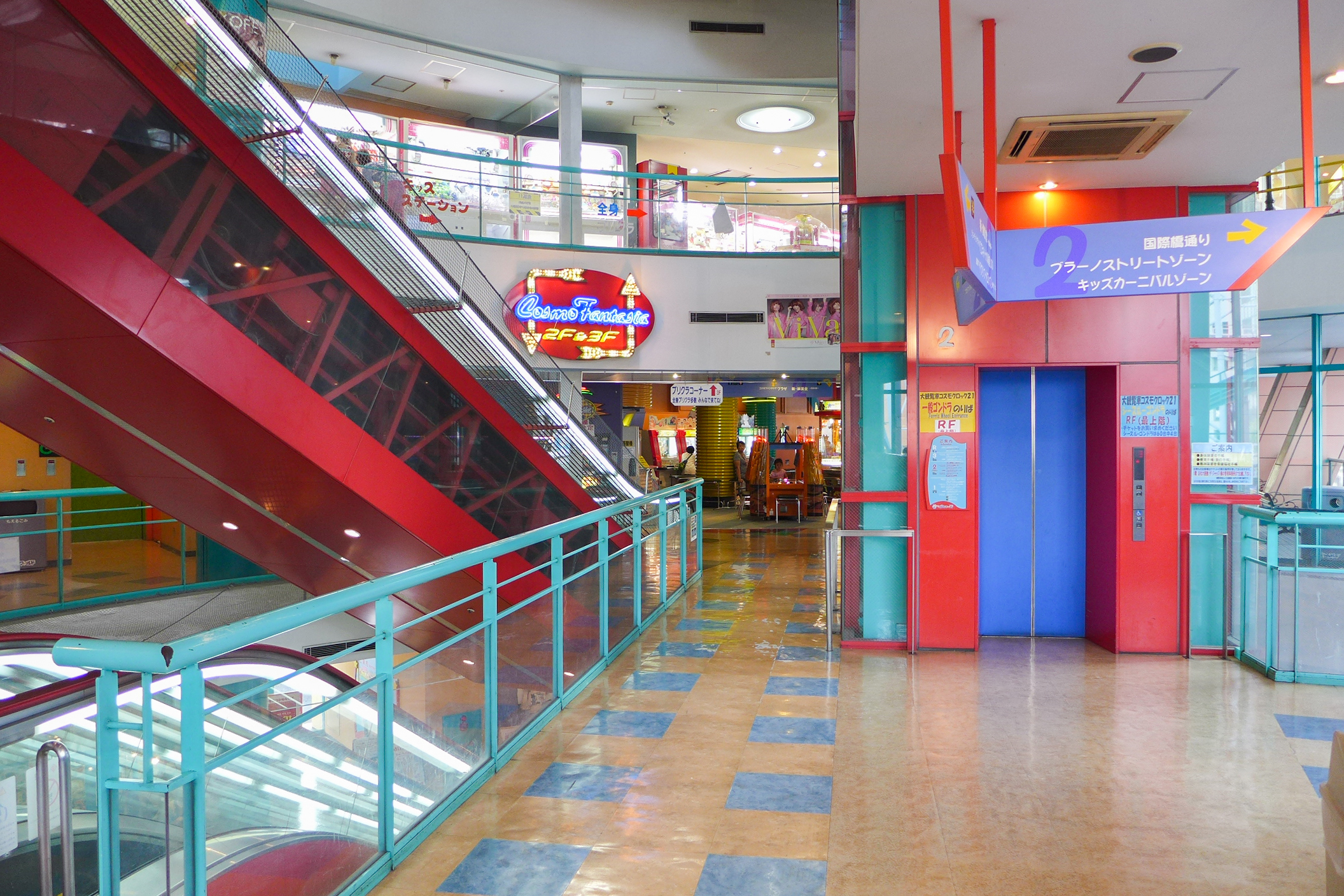
Cosmo Fantasia

Yokohama Cosmo World (よこはまコスモワールド, Yokohama Kosumo Wārudo) is a theme park in Yokohama, Kanagawa Prefecture, Japan. It contains the Cosmo Clock 21, formerly the tallest Ferris wheel in the world. It is since 1999 home to a unique coaster from Senyo Kogyo, named Diving Coaster: Vanish.

The park is open year-round, and admission is free, but visitors must purchase individual ride tickets or a day pass to enjoy the attractions.

== Background ==
Yokohama Cosmo World is managed by the Senyo Kogyo company. It is located in the Minato Mirai 21 District of Yokohama. It spans between the towns of Shinko in Naka district, and Minato Mirai in Nishi district.

Originally used for the Yokohama Exotic Showcase exhibition in 1989, the Cosmo Clock 21 ferris wheel was part of the "Cosmo World Children’s Republic." After the exhibition ended, it was decided that the Cosmo Clock 21 would continue operation, along with the rest of Cosmo World. At that time, Cosmo World was adjacent to Nippon Maru Memorial park and took up only 23 blocks of Minato Mirai district.

After this, it was decided that Cosmo World would be expanded and the Cosmo Clock 21 ferris wheel would be moved toward the opposite shore in Shinko, as a result of Minato Mirai noticeably expanding. Work including the relocation of the ferris wheel began in 1997 and the park was temporarily closed. The park was partially opened in 1998 and officially reopened on March 18, 1999.

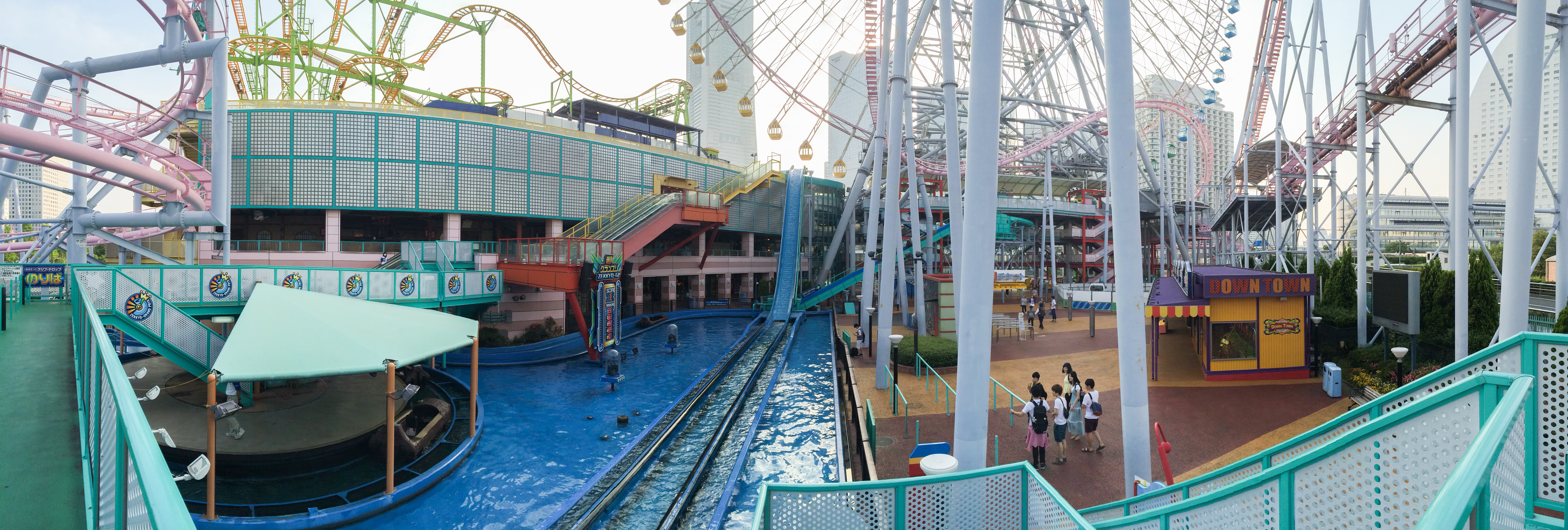
Yokohama Cosmo World panoramio

== Public transportation access ==
=== By subway ===
- 10 minute walk from JR Yokohama Municipal Subway (Sakuragicho Station)
- 2 minute walk from Minato Mirai Line (Minato Mirai Station)
