= Sun Wheel (Da Nang) =

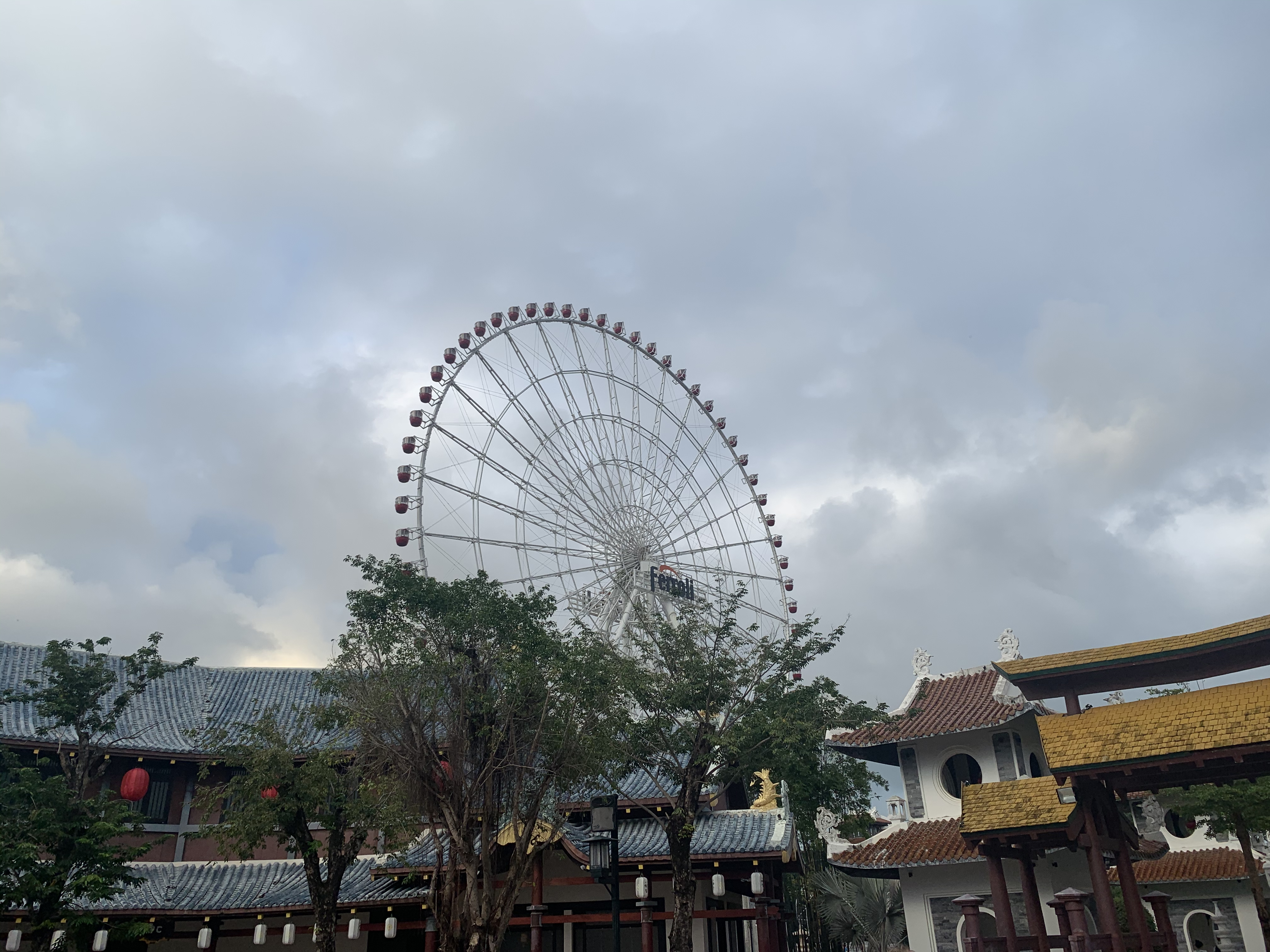
- Interactive map of the Sun Wheel area
- Former names: Igosu 108

General information
- Status: Closed
- Type: Observation wheel
- Location: Da Nang, Vietnam
- Coordinates: 16.040070°N 108.226492°E
- Opened: 2014

The Sun Wheel is a giant Ferris wheel located in the Asia Park theme park in the city of Da Nang in central Vietnam. It is 115 metres (377 ft) tall and opened on 18 July 2014, with 64 cabins. It takes 15 minutes to revolve, and has a capacity of 384 people. Asia Park was designed by the studio of architect Bill Bensley.

== History ==
It was formerly known as "Igosu 108", at Biwako Tower, Shiga, Japan, opened April 26, 1992 at 108 metres (354 ft) tall, hence its name. It was the tallest Ferris Wheel in the world from 1992 to 1997. It was closed in 2001. It was dismantled, relocated from Japan to Vietnam, and rebuilt on a taller base.
