= List of Ferris wheels =

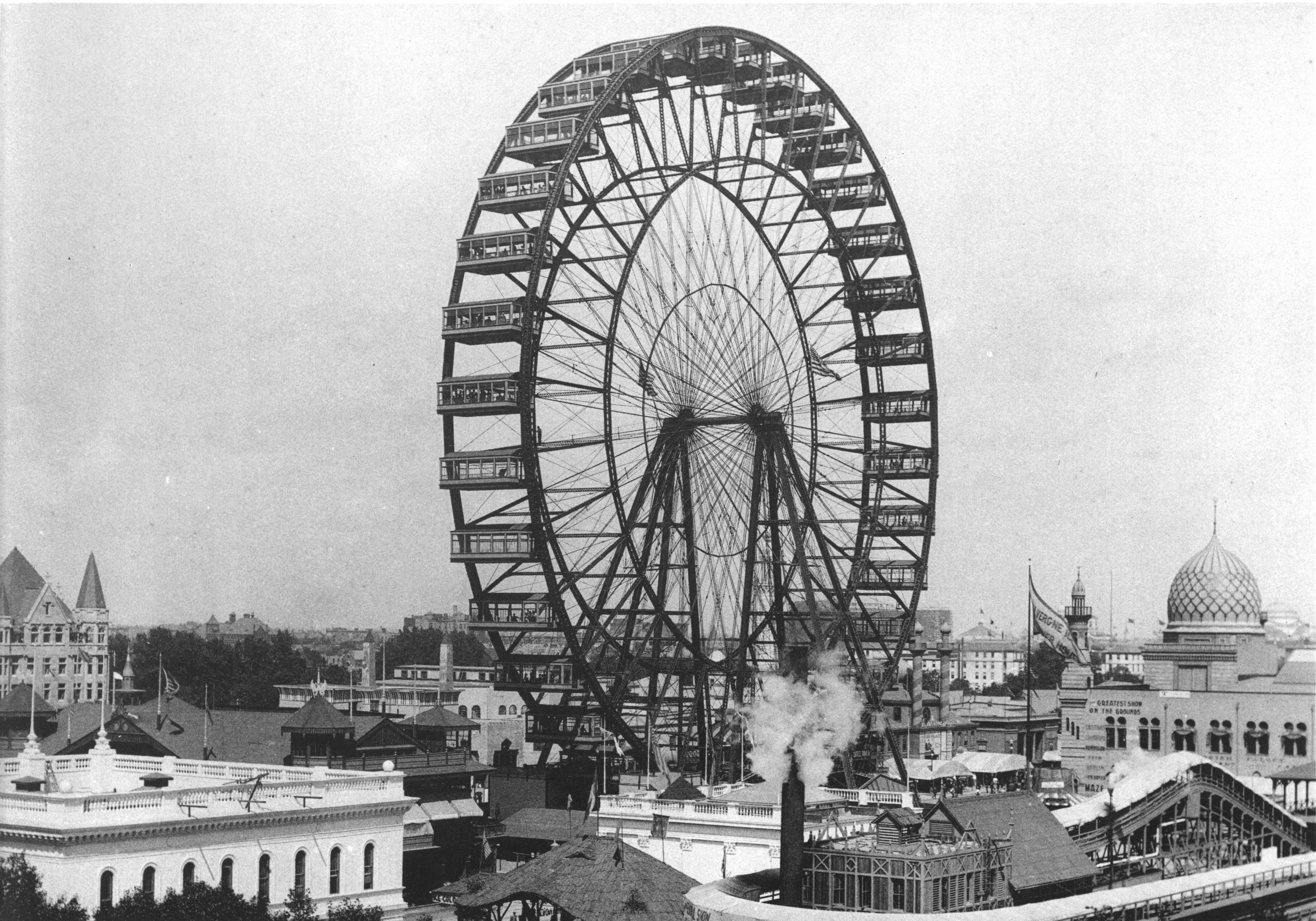
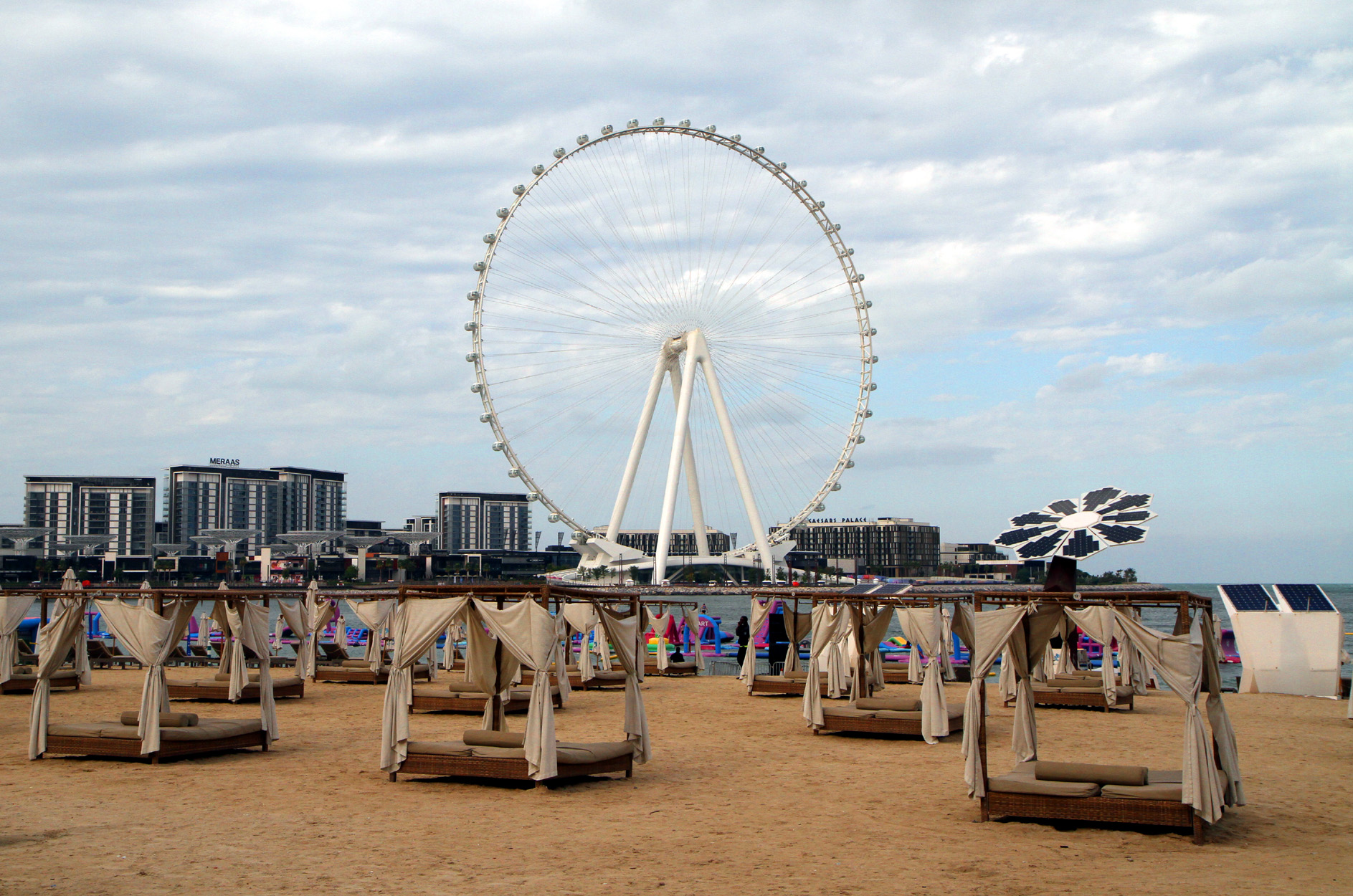
The original Ferris Wheel with a height of 80.4 metres (264 ft) next to the Ain Dubai, the current tallest Ferris wheel, with a height of 250 metres (820 ft). The Ain Dubai can carry 1750 people. The gondolas are each about twice the size of a city bus, and can be reserved for private parties.

This is a list of Ferris wheels whose construction has been completed and which have opened to the public. The Ferris wheel is a large, rotating structure with passenger cabins attached along its circumference, designed primarily for amusement and scenic observation. Since its inception in the late 19th century, Ferris wheels have undergone significant transformations in size, materials, and engineering, becoming both iconic attractions and architectural landmarks.

The first Ferris wheel was introduced in 1893 at the World’s Columbian Exposition in Chicago. Designed by George Washington Gale Ferris Jr., it stood 80.4 meters (264 feet) tall and was built as a centerpiece for the fair, intended to rival the grandeur of the Eiffel Tower. This original Ferris wheel set the standard for future designs and demonstrated the potential for large-scale observation wheels.

In the early 20th century, Ferris wheels continued to evolve. The Wiener Riesenrad, constructed in 1897 in Vienna, Austria, was notable for its iron construction and a height of 64.75 meters (212 feet), making it one of the tallest Ferris wheels of its time. Unlike its predecessor, which was dismantled in 1906, the Wiener Riesenrad remains in operation today, serving as a historical landmark. The late 20th century saw a resurgence of interest in Ferris wheels, with advancements in engineering allowing for even taller and more structurally complex designs. In 1989, the Cosmo Clock 21 in Yokohama, Japan, became the world’s tallest Ferris wheel at 107.5 meters (353 feet). It was one of the first large-scale wheels to incorporate an integrated clock, combining functionality with entertainment.

At the turn of the 21st century, Ferris wheels reached new heights. The London Eye, opened in 2000, represented a significant innovation in design. At 135 meters (443 feet) tall, it introduced the concept of a cantilevered observation wheel, supported only on one side rather than by a traditional A-frame structure. This allowed for a more open and panoramic viewing experience, setting a new standard for urban observation wheels. The title of the world's tallest Ferris wheel continued to change hands in the following years. The Star of Nanchang, completed in China in 2006, reached 160 meters (525 feet), surpassing the London Eye. It was soon overtaken by the Singapore Flyer, which stood at 165 meters (541 feet) when it opened in 2008. The High Roller in Las Vegas, launched in 2014, further pushed the boundaries with a height of 167.6 meters (550 feet), holding the record for several years. In 2021, the Ain Dubai was unveiled in the United Arab Emirates, becoming the tallest Ferris wheel in the world at 250 meters (820 feet). This structure marked a new era of observation wheels, integrating advanced engineering techniques and high-capacity cabins capable of hosting events and dining experiences. Throughout their history, Ferris wheels have evolved from simple fairground attractions into feats of engineering and urban landmarks. Each milestone in their development reflects advancements in technology, materials, and design, cementing their role as both entertainment structures and symbols of modernity.

== Fixed Ferris wheels ==
Fixed Ferris wheels are usually intended for permanent installation, as opposed to transportable wheels which are designed to be operated at multiple locations. Occasionally however, fixed wheels are also sometimes dismantled and relocated. Larger examples include the original Ferris Wheel, which operated at two sites in Chicago, Illinois, and a third in St. Louis, Missouri; Technocosmos/Technostar, which moved to Expoland, Osaka, after Expo '85, Tsukuba, Ibaraki, for which it was built, ended; and Cosmo Clock 21, which added 5 metres (16 ft) onto its original 107.5-metre (353 ft) height when erected for the second time at Minato Mirai 21, Yokohama, in 1999.

Key

Color	Name
	World's tallest ever at time of completion
	World's tallest extant at time of completion

Name	Height m (ft)	Completed	Country	Location	Coordinates	Remarks
Ain Dubai	250 (820)	2021	UAE	Dubai, United Arab Emirates	25.080111°N 55.124056°E	World's tallest since 2021
High Roller	167.6 (550)	2014	US	Las Vegas, Nevada	36.117698°N 115.16815°W	World's tallest 2014-2021
Singapore Flyer	165 (541)	2008	Singapore	Marina Centre, Downtown Core	1.289397°N 103.863231°E	World's tallest 2008-2014
Star of Nanchang	160 (525)	2006	China	Nanchang, Jiangxi	28.659332°N 115.845568°E	World's tallest 2006-2008
Bailang River Bridge Ferris Wheel	145 (476)	2017	China	Weifang, Shandong	37.108717°N 119.179345°E	Centreless non-rotating wheel
Sun of Moscow	140 (459)	2022	Russia	VDNKh, Moscow	55.8267°N 37.6270°E	Europe's tallest since 2022
London Eye	135 (443)	2000	UK	South Bank, Lambeth, London	51.50334°N 0.1197821°W	World's tallest 2000-2006
Squirrel Windmill	133 (436)	2020	China	Wuhu, Anhui	31.278467°N 118.341222°E	
Bay Glory	128 (420)	2021	China	Qianhai Bay, Shenzhen	22.541373°N 113.887673°E	
Sky Dream	126 (413)	2017	Taiwan	Lihpao Land, Taichung	24.325145°N 120.700690°E	
Redhorse Osaka Wheel	123 (404)	2016	Japan	Expocity, Suita, Osaka	34.805278°N 135.535°E	
Orlando Eye	122 (400)	2015	US	Orlando, Florida	28.443198°N 81.468296°W	
Vinpearl Sky Wheel	120 (394)	2017	Vietnam	Nha Trang	12.2220492°N 109.2425425°E	Picture Vietnam's tallest since 2017
Suzhou Ferris Wheel	120 (394)	2009	China	Suzhou, Jiangsu	31.3162939°N 120.7084501°E	
Melbourne Star	120 (394)	2008	Australia	Docklands, Melbourne	37.8110723°S 144.9368763°E	
Tianjin Eye	120 (394)	2008	China	Yongle Bridge, Tianjin	39.1533636°N 117.1802616°E	
Changsha Ferris Wheel	120 (394)	2004	China	Changsha, Hunan	28.1821772°N 112.9800886°E	
Zhengzhou Ferris Wheel	120 (394)	2003	China	Century Amusement Park, Henan	34.732871°N 113.718739°E	
Sky Dream Fukuoka	120 (394)	2002	Japan	Evergreen Marinoa, Fukuoka, Kyūshū	33.5956845°N 130.3225279°E	Closed September 2009
Diamond and Flower Ferris Wheel	117 (384)	2001	Japan	Kasai Rinkai Park, Tokyo, Honshū	35.6439052°N 139.8572257°E	
Sun Wheel (Da Nang)	115 (377)	2014	Vietnam	Da Nang	16.040070°N 108.226492°E	
Star of Lake Tai	115 (377)	2008	China	Lake Tai, Wuxi, Jiangsu	31.5208296°N 120.260945°E	Picture
Daikanransha	115 (377)	1999	Japan	Palette Town, Odaiba, Honshū	35.6263915°N 139.7822902°E	World's tallest 1999-2000
Cosmo Clock 21 (2nd installation)	112.5 (369)	1999	Japan	Minato Mirai 21, Yokohama, Honshū	35.4553872°N 139.6367347°E	
Tempozan Ferris Wheel	112.5 (369)	1997	Japan	Osaka, Honshū	34.6561657°N 135.431031°E	World's tallest 1997-1999
Harbin Ferris Wheel	110 (361)	2003	China	Harbin, Heilongjiang	45.7776481°N 126.6634637°E	
Shanghai Ferris Wheel	108 (354)	2002	China	Jinjiang Action Park, Shanghai	31.1401286°N 121.4030752°E	
Dianchi Eye	108 (354)	2018	China	Colorful Yunnan Paradise, Kunming	24.773456°N 102.739149°E	
Cosmo Clock 21 (1st installation)	107.5 (353)	1989	Japan	Minato Mirai 21, Yokohama, Honshū	?	World's tallest 1989-1997
Greenland Ferris Wheel	105 (344)	2005	Japan	Greenland, Arao	32.988235876°N 130.4665935°E	
Space Eye	100 (328)	1990	Japan	Space World, Kitakyūshū, Kyūshū	33.8716939°N 130.8099014°E	Picture
Grande Roue de Paris	100 (328)	1900	France	Champ de Mars, Paris	48.852222°N 2.299167°E	World's tallest 1900-1920
Great Wheel	94 (308)	1895	UK	Earls Court, London	51.48835°N 0.19889°W	World's tallest 1895-1900
The Valley of Legends Ferris wheel	92 (302)	2024	Uzbekistan	The Valley of Legends Theme Park, Namangan	41.0031450°N 71.6169645°E	Tallest in Uzbekistan
Dream Wheel	91.4 (300)	2022	US	American Dream, East Rutherford, New Jersey	40.80906°N 74.06760°W	
Roda Rico	91 (299)	2022	Brazil	São Paulo, São Paulo	23°32′47.1″S 46°43′51.3″W	Tallest in Latin America
Eurowheel	90 (295)	1999	Italy	Mirabilandia, Ravenna	44.3392161°N 12.2622228°E	Tallest extant in Europe 1999
Aurora Wheel	90 (295)	?	Japan	Nagashima Spa Land, Mie, Honshū	35.0298207°N 136.7336351°E	Picture
Heart of Antalya	90 (295)	2019	Turkey	Konyaaltı, Antalya	36.88617°N 30.65933°E	Tallest in Turkey since 2019
Dhaka Eye	90 (295)	2026	Bangladesh	Bashundhara Central Park, Purbachal Expressway, Bashundhara Residential Area, Dhaka		Tallest in Bangladesh and South Asia.
Rio Star	88 (289)	2019	Brazil	Rio de Janeiro, Rio de Janeiro	22°53′34.7″S 43°11′39.7″W	Picture
Sky Wheel	88 (289)	1988	Taiwan	Janfusun Fancyworld, Gukeng	23.6202611°N 120.5763352°E	
Phnom Penh Eye	88 (289)	2020	Cambodia	Prince Manor Resort, Phnom Penh	13.86250°N 100.51444°E	Picture The tallest Ferris wheel in Cambodia since 2020.
Technostar; Technocosmos	85 (279)	? 1985	Japan	Expoland, Osaka, Honshū (?-2009); Expo '85, Tsukuba, Honshū (1985-?)	34.803772°N 135.535916°E; 36.061203°N 140.073055°E	Technocosmos renamed/relocated World's tallest extant 1985-1989
Angkor Eye	85 (279)	2020	Cambodia	Siem Reap Angkor	13.37685°N 103.83274°E	Picture
Sochi Ferris wheel	83.5 (274)	2012	Russia	Lazarevskoe Gorky Park, Sochi, Krasnodar Krai	43.905990°N 39.328335°E	Tallest in Russia since 2012
FG Big Wheel	82 (269)	2020	Brazil	Balneário Camboriú, Santa Catarina		
The original Ferris Wheel	80.4 (264)	1893	US	Chicago (1893-1903); St.Louis (1904-1906)	see article	World's tallest 1893-1894
Tbilisi Ferris Wheel	80 (262)	2010	Georgia	Mtatsminda Park, Tbilisi	41.6955592°N 44.7812337°E	Video
E-DA Ferris Wheel	80 (262)	2010	Taiwan	E-DA Outlet Mall, Dashu, Kaohsiung	22.730525°N 120.401612°E	Rooftop wheel - combined height 120 m
Fun Fair	80 (262)	2005	Iran	Mellat Amusement Park, Mashhad	36.3202774°N 59.5348263°E	Picture
HEP Five Wheel	75 (246)	1998	Japan	HEP Five building, Osaka, Honshū	34.7040469°N 135.5001676°E	Rooftop wheel - combined height 106 m
Moscow-850	73 (240)	1997	Russia	VVC, Moscow	55.82786°N 37.64020°E	Tallest in Europe 1997–99. Demolished in 2016.
Polaris Tower	72 (236)	1993	S.Korea	Kumdori Land, Yuseong-gu, Daejon	36.3803416°N 127.3841143°E	Picture Kumdori Land closed in 2012
Miramar Ferris Wheel	70 (230)	2002	Taiwan	Miramar Entertainment Park, Taipei	25.0828393°N 121.5576911°E	Rooftop wheel - combined height 100 m
Wheel at Steel Pier	69 (226)	2017	US	Steel Pier, Atlantic City, New Jersey	39.3575325°N 74.4188651°W	
J-Sky	69 (226)	2017	Indonesia	Jakarta Garden City, Jakarta	6.17273849°S 106.95314956°E	
Blackpool Great Wheel	67 (220)	1896	UK	Winter Gardens, Blackpool	53.81666°N 3.05152°W	Closed in 1928
Astana Ferris Wheel	65 (213)	2017	Kazakhstan	Duman Entertainment Centre, Nur-Sultan	51.147322°N 71.414537°E	
Budapest Eye	65 (213)	2013	Hungary	Erzsébet Square, Belváros-Lipótváros, Budapest	47.49813°N 19.05201°E	
Pampanga Eye	65 (213)	2014	Philippines	SM City Pampanga, San Fernando, Pampanga	15.05385°N 120.69676°E	
Rīgas panorāmas rats	65 (213)	2025	Latvia	Rīgas panorāmas rats, Riga	56.9409927°N 24.0880591°E	
Sokcho Eye	65 (213)	2023	S.Korea	Sokcho, Gangwon		
Wiener Riesenrad	64.75 (212)	1897	Austria	Prater, Leopoldstadt, Vienna	48.2166505°N 16.3959494°E	World's tallest extant 1920-1985
Texas Star	64.6 (212)	1985	US	Fair Park, Dallas, Texas	32.776738°N 96.759269°W	
Sky Eye	63 (207)	2013	Philippines	Sky Fun, Tagaytay, Cavite	14.095125°N 120.937807°E	
Yomiuriland Ferris wheel	61.4 (201)	?	Japan	Yomiuriland, Inagi, Tokyo	35.6254628°N 139.5161533°E	
Great Smoky Mountain Wheel	61 (200)	2013	US	Pigeon Forge, Tennessee	35.8037785°N 83.5715937°W	
St. Louis Wheel	61 (200)	2019	US	St. Louis Union Station, St. Louis, MO	38.626991°N 90.207108°W	
Wheel of Brisbane	60 (197)	2008	Australia	Brisbane	27.4753178°S 153.0208572°E	Second tallest Ferris wheel in Australia
La Grande Roue de Montréal	60 (197)	2017	Canada	Montreal, Quebec	45.508476°N 73.548655°W	Tallest Ferris wheel in Canada
Iremel	60 (197)	2015	Russia	Ufa, Bashkortostan	54.713639°N 55.995694°E	Picture
Hong Kong Observation Wheel	60 (197)	2014	Hong Kong	Central, Hong Kong	22.2852466°N 114.1617635°E	
Baku Ferris Wheel	60 (197)	2014	Azerbaijan	Baku Boulevard, Baku	40.354717°N 49.837584°E	
Big O	60 (197)	?	Japan	Tokyo Dome City, Tokyo	35.7060722°N 139.7539139°E	Centerless non-rotating wheel
Eye of the Emirates	60 (197)	2005	UAE	Al Qasba, Sharjah	25.3220621°N 55.3748703°E	
Amuran	60 (197)	2004	Japan	Kagoshima, Kyushu	31.5844443°N 130.5428821°E	Rooftop wheel - combined height 91 m
Đầm Sen Park Ferris wheel	60 (197)	?	Vietnam	Đầm Sen Park, Ho Chi Minh City	10.7646666°N 106.6376889°E	
Luna Park	60 (197)	2016	Israel	Tel Aviv, Israel	32.106279°N 34.812026°W	
Eye of Kenya	60 (197)	2019	Kenya	Nairobi, Kenya	1°12′38″S 36°47′40″E	
Centennial Wheel	60 (197)	2016	US	Navy Pier, Chicago, Illinois	41.89178333°N 87.60745°W	Replaced Original Navy Pier Wheel (1995–2015).Original Wheel was Dismantled and Moved to Branson, Missouri (2016)
Myrtle Beach SkyWheel	57 (187)	2011	US	Myrtle Beach, South Carolina	33.692035°N 78.87954°W	
WonderWheel	56 (184)	2022	Poland	Energylandia, Zator	50.001219°N 19.403830°E	
Grande Roue de Marseille	55 (180)	2009	France	Marseille, Provence-Alpes-Côte d'Azur	43.2957003°N 5.3720613°E	
Mall of Asia Eye	55 (180)	2011	Philippines	SM Mall of Asia, Pasay, Metro Manila	14.532923°N 120.979147°E	
Al Zawra’a Dream Park Ferris wheel	55 (180)	2011	Iraq	Al Zawra’a Dream Park, Baghdad	33.312670°N 44.370809°E	Picture
Kyrlay Amusement Park Ferris wheel	55 (180)	2004	Russia	Kyrlay Amusement Park, Kazan, Tatarstan	55.809867°N 49.099126°E	Picture
Kharkiv Ferris wheel	55 (180)	?	Ukraine	Park of Maxim Gorky, Kharkiv	50.020314°N 36.246171°E	
Batumi Ferris Wheel	55 (180)		Georgia	Batumi	41.655332°N 41.642603°E	
Colossus	54.9 (180)	1984	US	Six Flags St. Louis, Eureka, Missouri	38.5146403°N 90.6763834°W	
Gorky Park Ferris wheel	54 (177)	2003	Belarus	Gorky Park, Minsk	53.9033268°N 27.5745142°E	
Skyviews Miami	53.6 (176)	2020	US	Bayside Marketplace, Miami, Florida	25.778395°N 80.186867°W	
Capital Wheel	53.3 (175)	2014	US	National Harbor, Maryland	38°47′8.2″N 77°1′8.9″W	
Seattle Great Wheel	53.3 (175)	2012	US	Pier 57, Seattle, Washington	47.606139°N 122.342528°W	
Niagara SkyWheel	53.3 (175)	2006	Canada	Clifton Hill, Niagara Falls, Ontario	43.090916°N 79.075921°W	
Skyview Vrnjačka Banja	50 (164)	2023	Serbia	Vrnjačka Banja, Serbia	43.6273°N 20.8963°W	Tallest wheel in Southeastern Europe
Amber Sky	50 (164)	2016	Poland	Gdańsk, Poland	54.3527694°N 18.6592275°E	
Kaohsiung Eye	50 (164)	2002	Taiwan	Dream Mall, Kaohsiung	22.595°N 120.306944°E	Rooftop wheel - combined height 102.5 m
Shining Flower	50 (164)	?	Japan	Fuji-Q Highland, Fujiyoshida, Honshū	35.486681°N 138.780434°E	
Giant Wheel	50 (164)	1982; 1983	US	1982 World's Fair, Knoxville, Tennessee; Darien Lake, Darien Center, New York	35.962064°N 83.924389°W; 42.92851°N 78.38488°W	Largest wheel in US when constructed.
Pixar Pal-A-Round	48.8 (160)	2001	US	Disney California Adventure Park	33.8051785°N 117.9221848°W	Eccentric Ferris wheel
Cakra Manggilingan Ferris Wheel	48 (157)	?	Indonesia	Sindu Kusuma Edupark, Sleman	7.767283°S 110.355570°E	
Seventh Heaven	48 (157)	2014	Russia	Gafuri Park, Ufa, Bashkortostan	54.770248°N 56.021667°E	Picture
Alem	47.6 (156)	2012	Turkmenistan	Alem Cultural and Entertainment Center, Ashgabat	37.898908°N 58.299183°E	World's tallest in an enclosed space
Giant Wheel	47.5 (156)	1985	US	Morey's Piers, Wildwood, New Jersey	38.98525°N 74.80925°W	
KC Wheel	46 (151)	2023	US	Kansas City, Missouri	39.082380°N 94.592544°W	
SkyStar Wheel	45.7 (150)	2020	US	Fisherman's Wharf, San Francisco, California	37.80860°N 122.41348°W	Previously located in Golden Gate Park (2020–2023); Louisville, Kentucky; Norfolk, Virginia; and Cincinnati, Ohio
Branson Ferris Wheel	45.7 (150)	2016	US	The Track Family Fun Parks, Hwy 76, Branson, Missouri	36.6395442°N 93.2877514°W	Originally Navy Pier Ferris Wheel (1995–2015). Renamed, relocated to Branson, Missouri (2016)
Sky Scraper	45.7 (150)	1991	US	Lagoon Amusement Park, Utah	40.9874323°N 111.8945745°W	
Wonder Wheel	45.7 (150)	1920	US	Deno's Wonder Wheel Amusement Park, New York City	40.574°N 73.97891667°W	Eccentric Ferris wheel
Brighton Wheel	45 (148)	2011	UK	Brighton	50.8191°N 0.1344°W	Closed in 2016
Riesenrad Spreepark	45 (148)	1989	Germany	Spreepark, Berlin	52.48524°N 13.49083°E	
Blumenrad	45 (148)	?	Austria	Prater, Vienna	48.217196°N 16.398801°E	
Dream Land Ferris wheel	45 (148)	?	Cambodia	Dream Land, Phnom Penh	11.557720°N 104.936720°E	
SkyView de Pier	45 (148)	2016	Netherlands	Scheveningen, The Hague	52.1173537°N 4.2788422°E	
SkyView Rotterdam	45 (148)	2018	Netherlands	Stadsdriehoek, Rotterdam	51.9208115°N 4.4847428°E	
La Grande Roue	45 (148)	2000	Netherlands	Walibi Holland	52.441151°N 5.764234°E	
Skywheel of Tallinn	45 (148)	2019	Estonia	T1 Mall of Tallinn, Tallinn	59.4244154°N 24.7938402°E	Rooftop wheel - combined height 80 m
Big Wheel	44 (144)	1992	Germany	Fort Fun Abenteuerland, Bestwig	51.310181°N 8.43998268°E	
Giant Wheel	41.5 (136)	1972	US	Cedar Point, Sandusky, Ohio	41.481551°N 82.679849°W	
Palanga Sky Wheel	40 (131)	2022	Lithuania	Palanga, Lithuania	55.919159°N 21.053586°E	Tallest Ferris wheel in Lithuania
Ferris wheel in Legendia	40 (131)	1985	Poland	Katowice/Chorzów	50.275723°N 18.988229°E	Tallest Ferris wheel in Poland
Wheel of Fate	40 (131)	1995	Philippines	Enchanted Kingdom, Santa Rosa, Laguna	14.282423°N 121.0950369°E	
Ferris wheel of Santorini Park	40 (131)	2012	Thailand	Cha-Am, Phetchaburi	12.799722°N 99.966944°E	
Riesenrad Skyline-Park	40 (131)	2002	Germany	Skyline-Park, Bad Wörishofen	48.042995166°N 10.594470275°E	
SkyWheel Helsinki	40 (131)	2014	Finland	Helsinki, Finland	60°10′1.8″N 24°57′35.2″E	
I-X Center Ferris wheel	38 (125)	?	US	I-X Center, Cleveland, Ohio	41.39895°N 81.853516°W	
Lipetsk Ferris Wheel	37 (121)	2017	Russia	Lipetsk, Russia	52.6045°N 39.6055°E	
Riesenrad Traumland Bärenhöhle	35 (115)	1992	Germany	Traumland Bärenhöhle, Sonnenbühl	48.37173058°N 9.21701379°E	
Blackpool Central Pier Big Wheel	33 (108)	1990	UK	Central Pier, Blackpool	53.810942°N 3.057622°W	To be replaced in 2023 with a larger version.
Riesenrad Serengeti-Park Hodenhagen	33 (108)	1992	Germany	Serengeti-Park Hodenhagen, Hodenhagen	52.749535279°N 9.62436303°E	
Ferris Wheel	30.5 (100)	1994	US	Waldameer & Water World, Erie, Pennsylvania	42.108691°N 80.155458°W	
Revolver	30.5 (100)	?	US	Fun Spot America, Orlando, Florida	28.464242°N 81.455307°W	
Giant Gondola Wheel	27.4 (90)	1989	US	Michigan's Adventure, Muskegon, Michigan	43.342043°N 86.279044°W	
Ocean Park Ferris wheel	27 (89)	?	Hong Kong	Ocean Park, Aberdeen	22.233205°N 114.169879°E	
Eclipse / Peeking Heights	25 (82)	see articles	UK	see articles	see articles	
Riesenrad Böhmischer Prater	21.5 (71)	1988	Austria	Böhmischer Prater, Vienna	48.16631102°N 16.4001535°E	
Giant Star Wheel	see article	?	Philippines	Star City, Pasay, Metro Manila	14.555957°N 120.985914°E	
Pacific Wheel	see article	?	US	Pacific Park, Santa Monica, California	34.0082°N 118.4978°W	World's only solar-powered
Uniroyal Giant Tire	see article	1964	US	1964 New York World's Fair, New York City	see article	Now a static display in Allen Park, Michigan
Batumi Technical University Tower Ferris wheel	?	?	Georgia	Batumi, Adjara	41.653938°N 41.637087°E	World's first skyscraper-mounted Wheel is 170 m up the 200 m tower

== Transportable Ferris wheels ==
Transportable Ferris wheels are designed to be operated at multiple locations, as opposed to fixed wheels which are usually intended for permanent installation. Small transportable designs may be permanently mounted on trailers, and can be moved intact. Larger transportable wheels are designed to be repeatedly dismantled and rebuilt, some using water ballast instead of the permanent foundations of their fixed counterparts.

Name	Height m (ft)	Inaugurated	Operator	Manufacturer	Remarks
Giant Wheel	disputed	?	World Carnival	Ronald Bussink	
Roue de Paris	60 (197)	1999		Ronald Bussink	
Steiger Ferris Wheel	60 (197)	1980	Steiger / Bad Oeynhausen	Kocks	World's tallest transportable wheel at time of inauguration
Europa-Rad	53 (174)	1992	Kipp & Sohn	Nauta-Bussink	
Jupiter	42 (138)	1995	Kipp & Barth	Nauta-Bussink	
Royal Bavarian Wheel	42 (138)	1992	Jost / Worms	Nauta-Bussink	
