= Sky Dream =

Sky Dream may refer to:

- Sky Dream Fukuoka, a former Ferris wheel in Japan
- Sky Dream (Taiwan), a Ferris wheel in Taiwan
