= Zhengzhou Ferris Wheel =

Ferris wheel in Zhengzhou, China

Coordinates: 34.732871°N 113.718739°E

- 郑州摩天轮
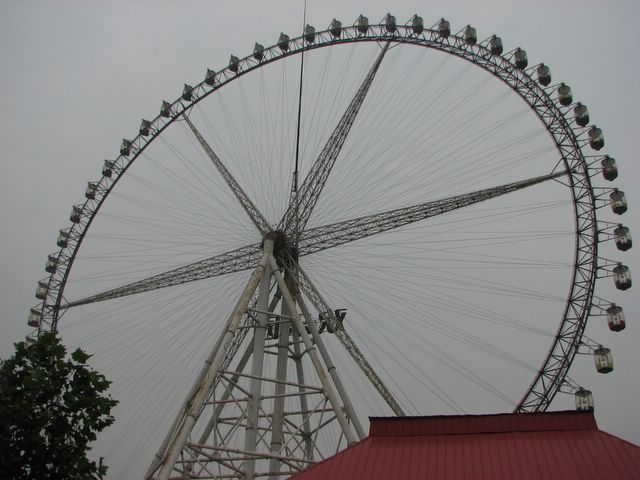
- Interactive map of the Zhengzhou Ferris Wheel area

General information
- Location: Century Amusement Park, Zhengzhou, Henan, China
- Completed: 2003
- Demolished: 2022-2023

Height
- Height: 120 metres (390 ft)

Zhengzhou Ferris Wheel was a 120-metre (390 ft) tall giant Ferris wheel at Century Amusement Park in Zhengzhou, Henan, China.

When it was completed in 2003, Zhengzhou Ferris Wheel was the tallest Ferris wheel in China, and the second tallest in the world, after the 135-metre (443 ft) London Eye. There are now four 120 m Ferris wheels in China, the other three being Changsha Ferris Wheel (completed 2004), Suzhou Ferris Wheel (completed 2009), and Tianjin Eye (completed 2008). The only Chinese Ferris wheel with a greater height is the 160-metre (520 ft) Star of Nanchang, which opened in 2006.

The Ferris wheel was demolished during late 2022 to early 2023.

There is at least one other giant Ferris wheel in Zhengzhou, at Renmin Park.
