= Suzhou Ferris Wheel =

Ferris wheel in Suzhou, Jiangsu, China

- 苏州摩天轮
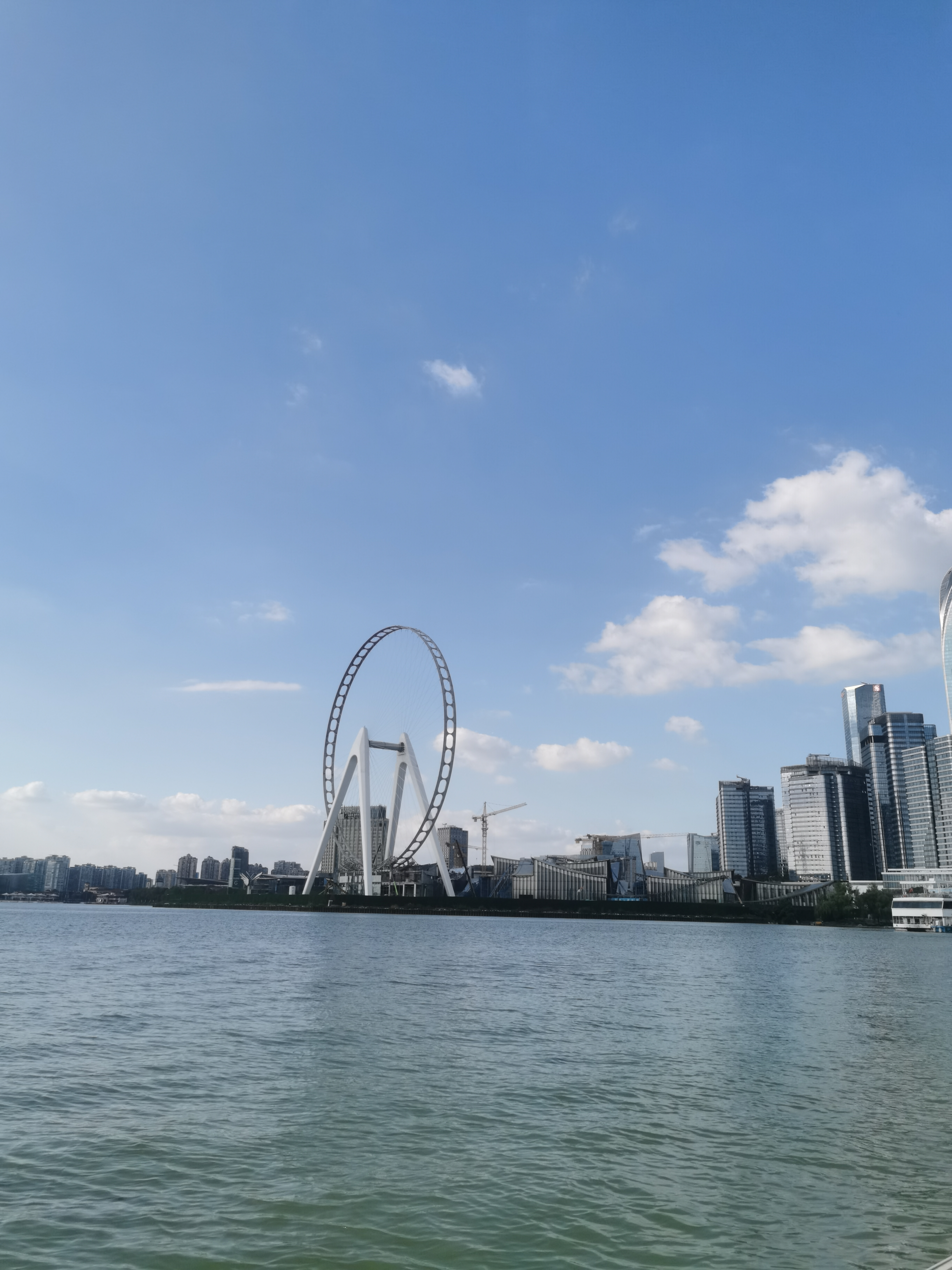
- Suzhou Ferris Wheel in 2024
- Interactive map of the Suzhou Ferris Wheel area

General information
- Location: Suzhou, Jiangsu, China
- Coordinates: 31.3162939°N 120.7084501°E

Height
- Height: 120 metres (394 ft)

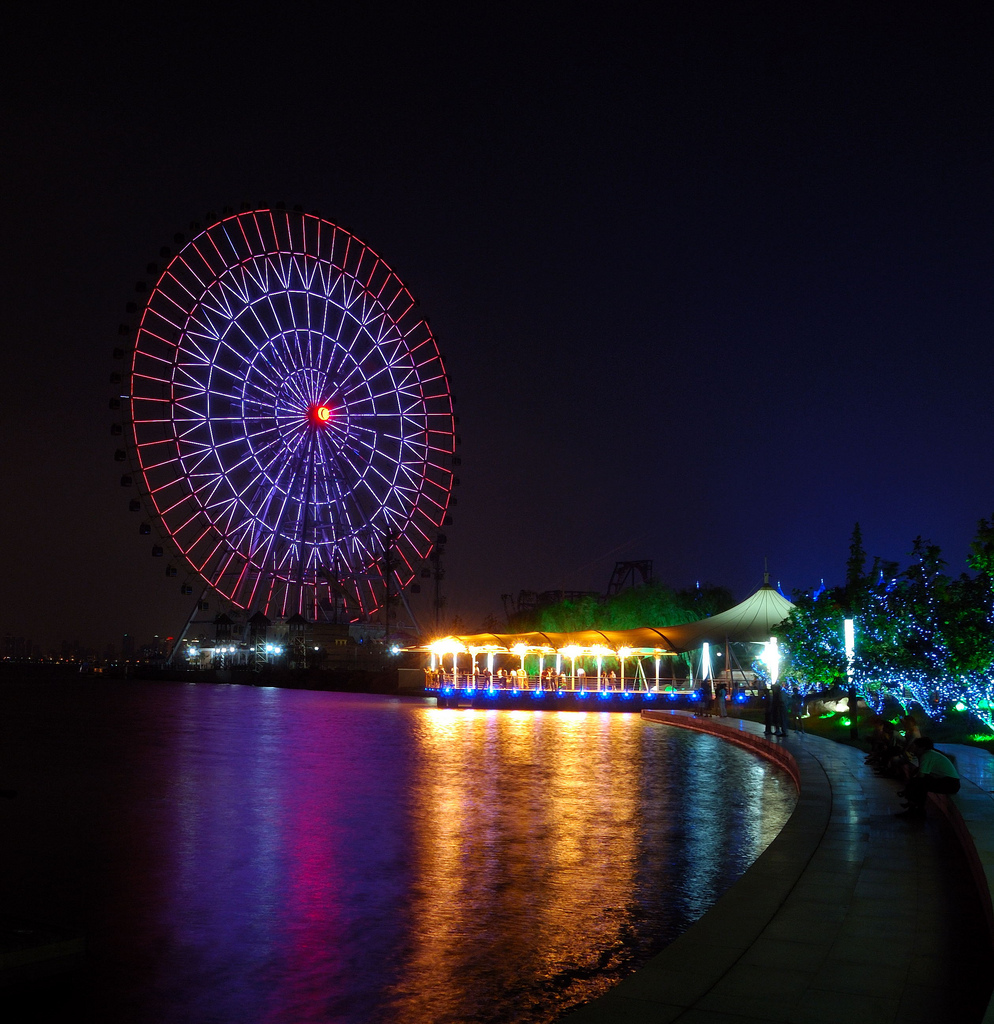
Suzhou Ferris Wheel in 2010

Suzhou Ferris Wheel is a 120-metre (394 ft) tall giant Ferris wheel on the east bank of Jinji Lake in Suzhou, Jiangsu, China. It has 60 passenger cabins, a maximum capacity of 300 passengers, and takes approximately 20 minutes to complete each revolution.

Suzhou Ferris Wheel was completed in 2009. It is one of four 120 m Ferris wheels in China, the other three being Changsha Ferris Wheel (completed 2004), Tianjin Eye (completed 2008), and Zhengzhou Ferris Wheel (completed 2003). The only Chinese Ferris wheel with a greater height is the 160-metre (525 ft) Star of Nanchang, which opened in 2006.
