= Changsha Ferris Wheel =

Ferris wheel in Changsha, China

Coordinates: 28.1821772°N 112.9800886°E

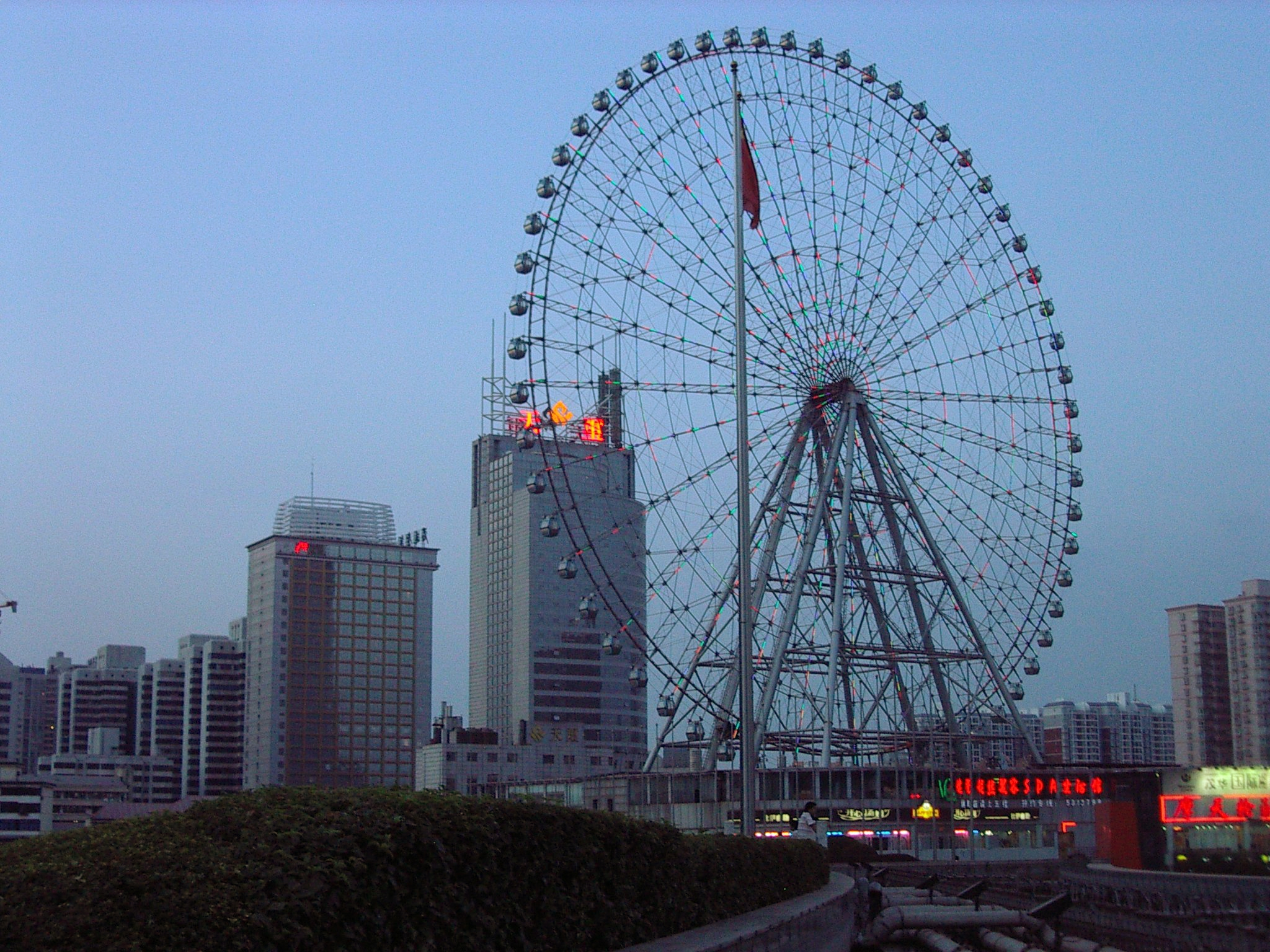
Changsha Ferris Wheel

Changsha Ferris Wheel is a 120-meter (390 ft)-tall giant Ferris wheel in Changsha, Hunan, China that has a diameter of 99 meters (325 ft). It is adjacent to Helong Stadium.

It was completed on September 30, 2004, and officially opened to the public on October 1, 2004.

Changsha Ferris Wheel is one of four 120 m Ferris wheels in China, the other three being Suzhou Ferris Wheel (completed 2009), Tianjin Eye (completed 2008), and Zhengzhou Ferris Wheel (completed 2003). The only Chinese Ferris wheel with a greater height is the 160-meter (520 ft)-tall Star of Nanchang, which opened in 2006.
