= Sky Dream (Taiwan) =

Ferris wheel in Houli, Taichung, Taiwan

Sky Dream 天空之夢摩天輪
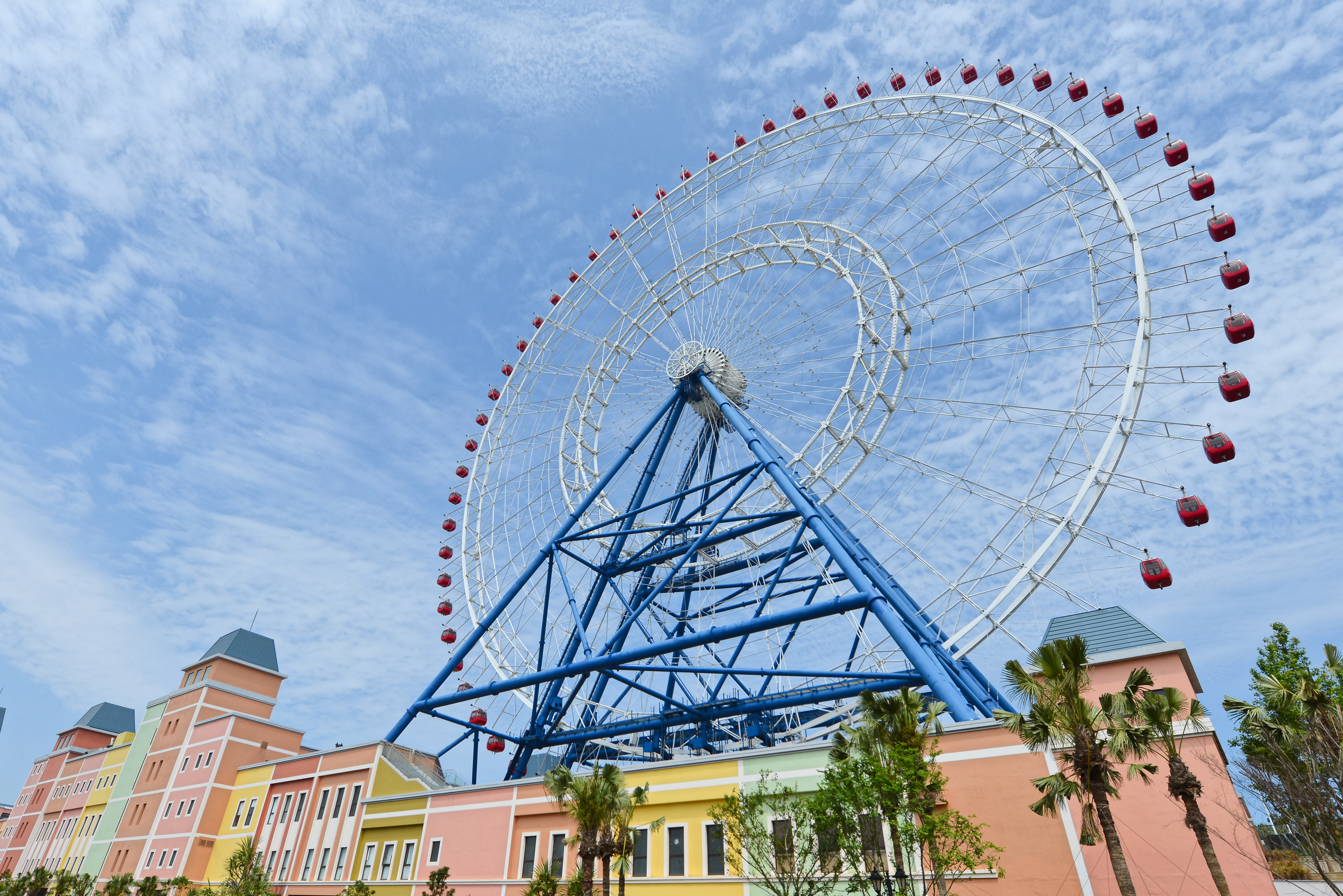

Lihpao Land
- Coordinates: 24°19′24.7″N 120°41′47.8″E
- Status: Operating
- Cost: NT$55 million
- Opening date: 13 May 2017

Ride statistics
- Attraction type: Ferris wheel
- Height: 126 m (413 ft)

The Sky Dream (traditional Chinese: 天空之夢摩天輪; simplified Chinese: 天空之梦摩天轮; pinyin: Tiānkōng Zhīmèng Mótiān Lún) is a 126-metre-tall giant Ferris wheel in LIHPAO Discovery Land, Houli District, Taichung, Taiwan. It is the largest Ferris wheel in Taiwan being 126 meters (413 feet) tall.

== History ==
The Ferris wheel was originally built as Sky Dream Fukuoka in Fukuoka, Japan. It opened in 2001 and closed on 26 September 2009. It was sold and dismantled in 2010 and shipped to Taiwan. Reconstruction at Lihpao Land started in 2014. It started its operation on May 13, 2017.

== Design ==
The Ferris wheel has a diameter of 126 meters and stands at an altitude of 384 meters above sea level. It has a total 60 passenger cars with each car can accommodate passengers up to 8 people. It runs at a speed of 25 minutes per revolution.

== See also ==
- List of Ferris wheels
