= Rio Star =

Ferris wheel in Rio de Janeiro, Brasil

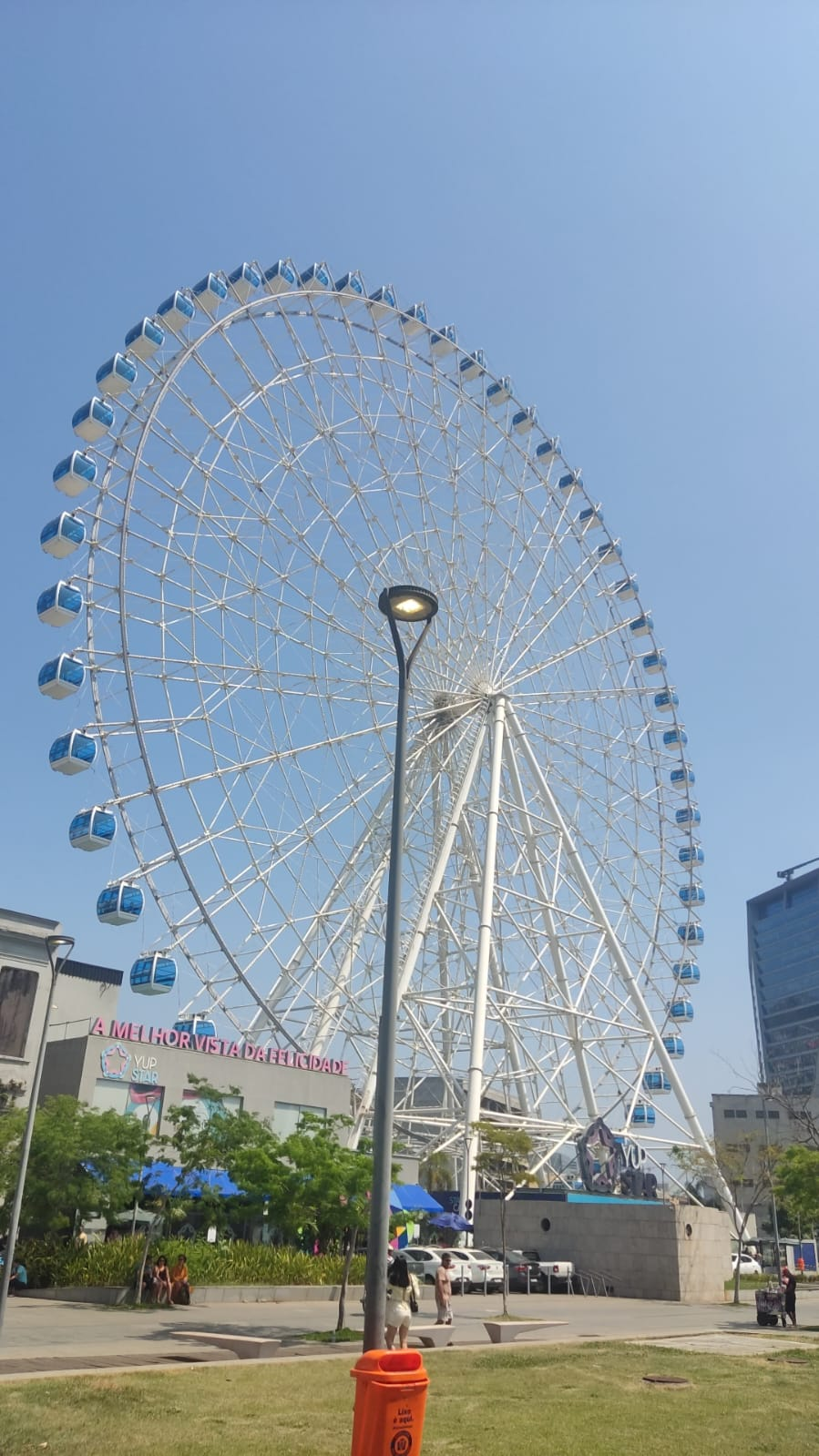
- Interactive map of the Rio Star area

General information
- Status: Operating
- Location: Santo Cristo, Rio de Janeiro, Rodrigues Alves Avenue, 455, Santo Cristo, Rio de Janeiro, Brazil
- Coordinates: 22°53′34.7″S 43°11′39.7″W
- Completed: 2019
- Opened: 6 December 2019
- Owner: Arc Big Eye

Dimensions
- Diameter: 88 metres (289 ft)

The Rio Star is a cantilevered observation wheel in the Santo Cristo neighborhood, located in the city of Rio de Janeiro, Brazil. With an overall height of 88 metres, from 2019 to November 2022, it was the tallest Ferris wheel in Latin America; however, it lost the title with the completion of the 91-meter Roda Rico, located in the city of São Paulo.
