= Roda Rico =

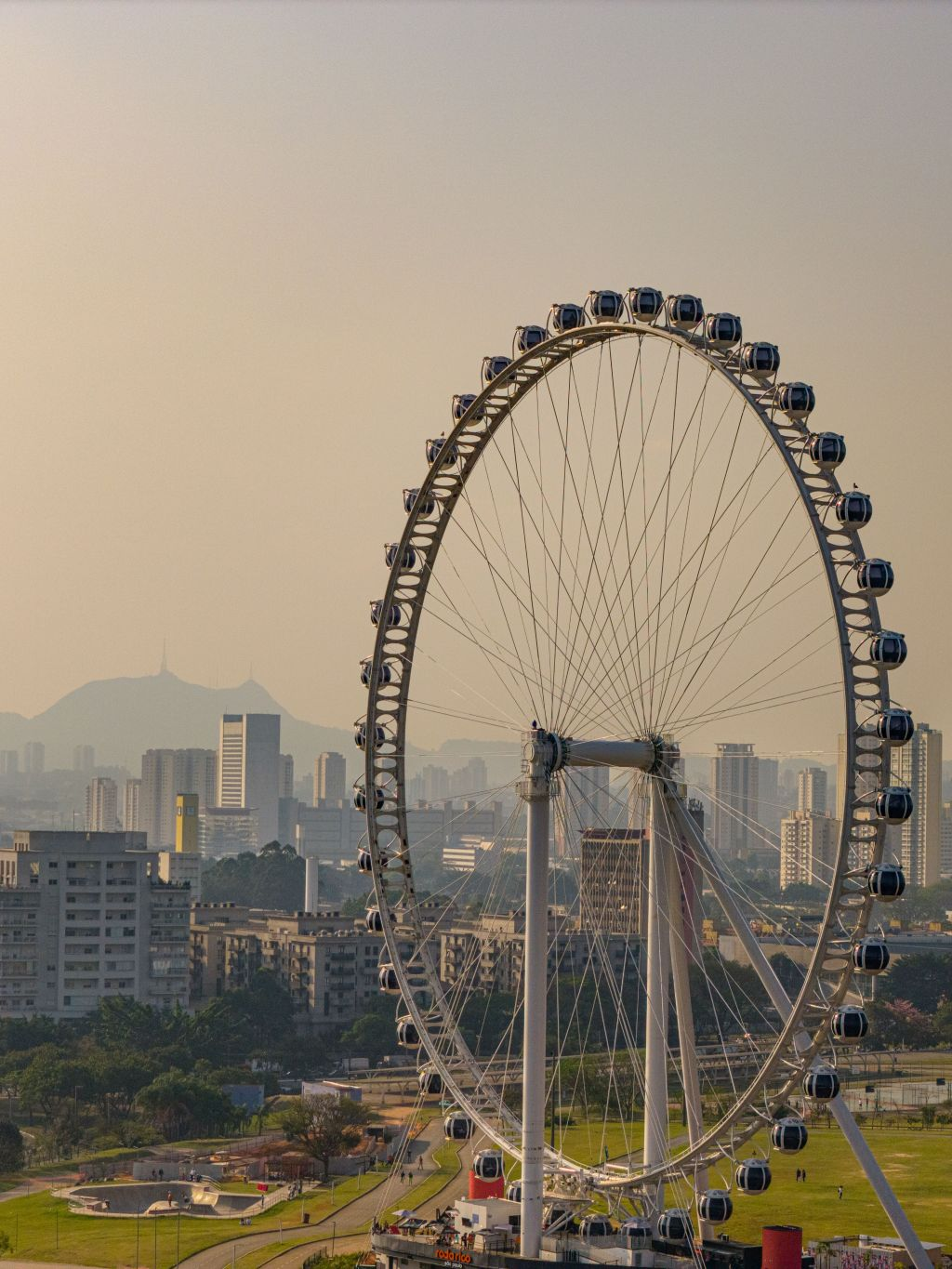

General information
- Type: Observation wheel
- Architectural style: Modern
- Location: Candido Portinari Park, São Paulo, Brazil
- Construction started: March 2022
- Completed: July 2022

Height
- Height: 91 metres (299 ft)

Technical details
- Material: Metal

Roda Rico (also formerly known as Roda São Paulo) is an observation wheel located in Candido Portinari Park, next to Villa-Lobos State Park, in the west zone of the city of São Paulo, Brazil. At 91 metres (299 ft) high and 80 metres (260 ft) in diameter, it is the tallest in Latin America, a title that belonged to Rio Star. It has 42 cabins, which can accommodate up to eight people and are equipped with air conditioning, cameras, intercoms, Wi-Fi and scenic lighting, designed to interact with the city. It is housed in an area of 4,500 square meters, about 3% of the total area of the park.

Announced in October 2020, its assembly began in March 2022, under the responsibility of the company São Paulo Big Wheel, which will also be in charge of its maintenance and management, and would be inaugurated in July of the same year; however, the deadline was postponed due to lack of inputs and manpower. It was inaugurated on December 9. It is expected to receive between 600,000 and 1 million visitors annually.

With the aim of improving the quality of life in the region on the banks of the Pinheiros River, which is in the process of being revitalized, with Roda Rico being part of the actions to revitalize its surroundings, the Ferris wheel will be planted with native trees in open areas around it and its design gives priority to the use of pavements that help soil drainage — with possibilities for water reservation and use — and materials and resources that ensure a dry and clean work.

== See also ==
- Rio Star
- London Eye
