= Alem Cultural and Entertainment Center =

Cultural center in Turkmenistan

Coordinates: 37°53′55″N 58°17′57″E

- Älem» medeni dynç alyş merkezi
- Interactive map of Alem Cultural and Entertainment Center
- Address: Ashgabat; Turkmenistan
- Type: Entertainment venue

Construction
- Opened: 2012

Alem Cultural and Entertainment Center (Turkmen: «Älem» medeni dynç alyş merkezi) is a cultural center in Ashgabat, Turkmenistan. It was officially opened to the public on May 18, 2012. The opening ceremony was attended by the President of Turkmenistan, Gurbanguly Berdimuhamedov.

The 95-metre (312 ft) tall structure has a 17-metre (56 ft) decorative spire on top and has six floors, each of which are 7 metres (23 ft) tall (four floors are above ground and two floors are below ground).

A 57-metre (187 ft) diameter glass and white-steel casing on top of the building contains a Ferris wheel known as 'Alem', meaning 'The Universe'. Alem was recognised by Guinness World Records as the world's tallest Ferris wheel in an enclosed space at the time of the opening ceremony.

The wheel itself is 47.6 metres (156 ft) in height and was built by Fabbri Group through its Giant Wheels brand.
