= Brighton Wheel =

Ferris wheel in Brighton, England

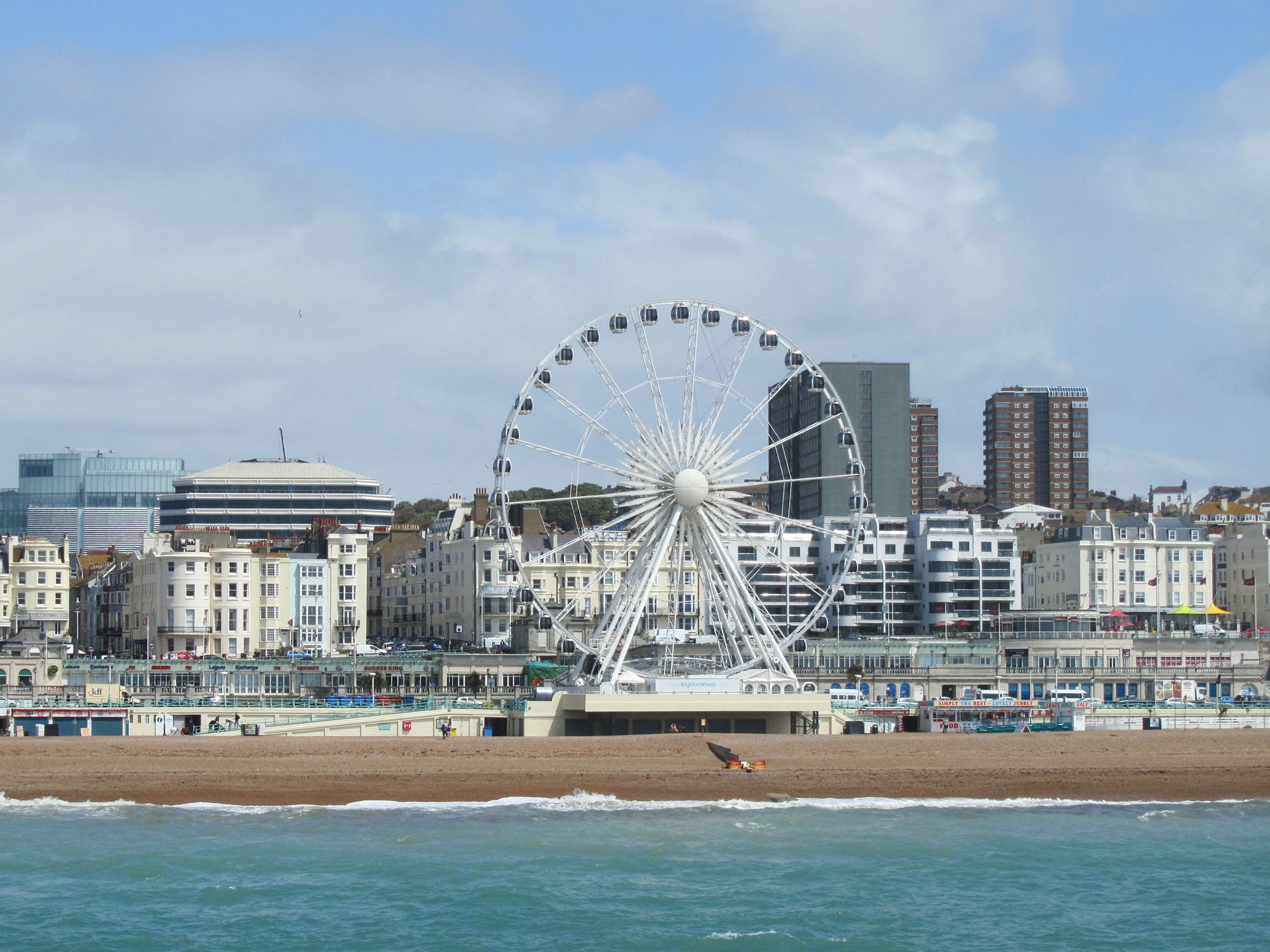
- The Brighton Wheel in June 2012

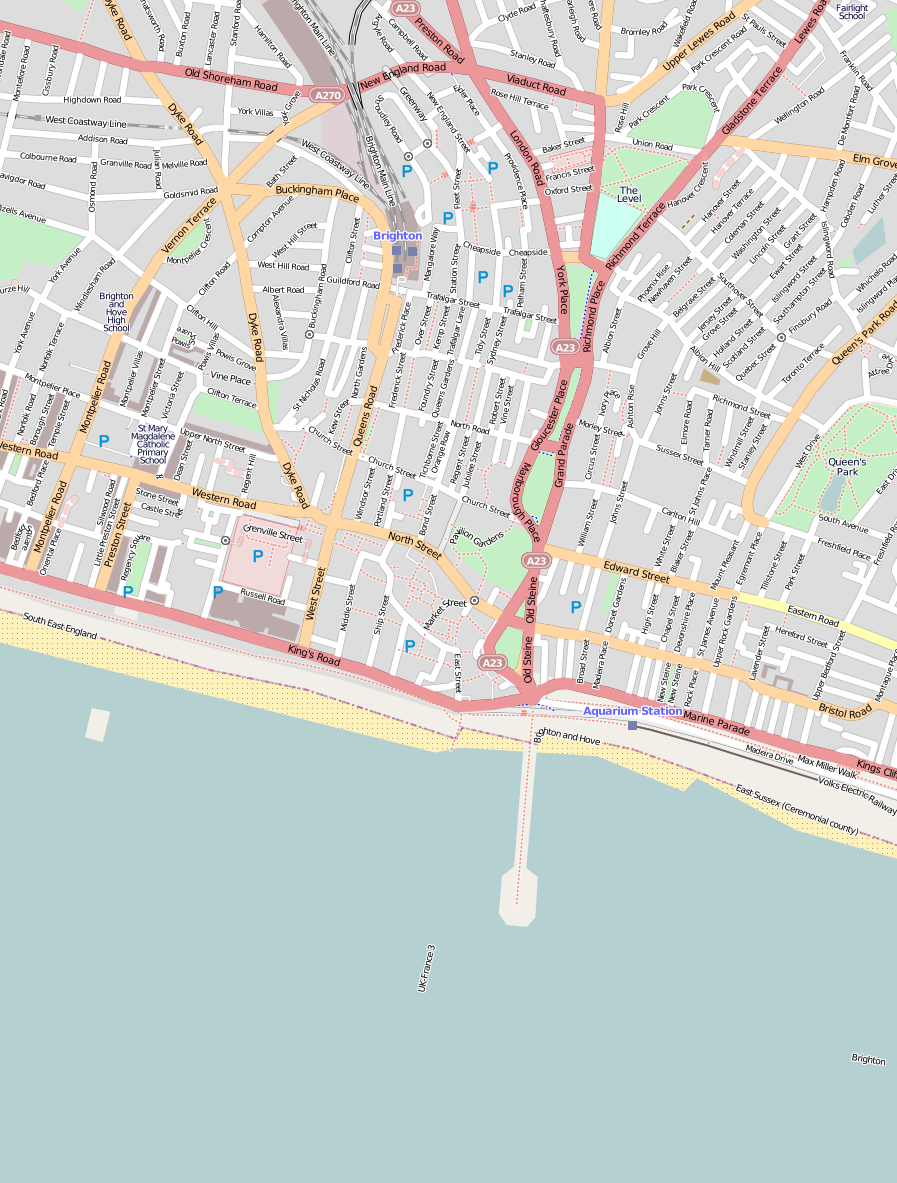
- Location within Brighton
- Alternative names: Brighton O; Wheel of Excellence; Brighton Eye

General information
- Status: Ceased operating 8 May 2016; wheel and support structure dismantled later that month
- Type: Ferris wheel
- Location: Dalton's Bastion, Madeira Drive, Brighton, United Kingdom
- Coordinates: 50.8191°N 0.1344°W
- Groundbreaking: August 2011
- Completed: 21 October 2011
- Opened: 24 October 2011
- Cost: £6 million

Dimensions
- Diameter: 45 metres (148 ft)

Design and construction
- Developer: Paramount Attractions

Website
- www.brightonwheel.com

The Brighton Wheel, also known during its planning and construction phase as the Brighton O and the Wheel of Excellence, was a transportable Ferris wheel installation which operated from October 2011 until May 2016 on the seafront in Brighton, part of the English city of Brighton and Hove. Situated below the East Cliff near Brighton Pier and built with private funding, its promoters anticipated that several hundred thousand visitors per year would experience the 12-minute ride. The wheel's location in a conservation area with many residential buildings proved controversial. In 2026 Brighton and Hove City Council stated that it was considering granting permission for the wheel to be re-erected next summer in 2027.

== History ==
The East Cliff, rising eastwards from Old Steine—the original fashionable centre of Brighton in the 18th century—was developed as a prestigious residential area from the early 19th century. Madeira Drive was built at the base of the cliff in 1823 and was extended to form a long, wide carriageway in 1872 and 1895. Early tourist attractions in the area included The Royal Suspension Chain Pier (1823), Brighton Aquarium (1872), Volk's Electric Railway (1883) and the Palace Pier (1899; now styled Brighton Palace Pier). About 150 acres (61 ha) of the East Cliff area was designated a conservation area in 1973—one of 34 conservation areas in Brighton and Hove.

Paramount Attractions, a local company, first proposed the construction of a Ferris wheel on Brighton seafront in 2009. They applied for a temporary planning order to erect a 60-metre (200 ft) wheel with 32 gondolas on the beach near the ruined West Pier. It would have stood opposite the Metropole Hotel very close to the proposed i360, a 600-foot (180 m) observation tower that had received planning permission in 2006 and on which some preliminary construction work had begun. The i360's developers objected to the planning application, as did the Metropole Hotel, conservationists and local residents—although there was also "vocal support" for Paramount's plan. The company withdrew the planning application in January 2010, just before Brighton and Hove City Council's expected rejection of it. At this stage, the name "Brighton O" was used for the scheme.

In March 2011, Paramount Attractions stated that they would submit a new application for a wheel of a similar size but with a different design—the proposed wheel near the West Pier would have had no spokes. The company chose a different site as well, on Madeira Drive, about 360 feet (110 m) east of Brighton Pier. The expected cost was £6 million, for which Paramount said they had secured funding. The application was submitted by the end of March, and an objection was soon received from The Regency Society. The conservation group, founded in 1945 by a group of architects, MPs and other prominent residents, stated that the wheel would affect the residential area of the East Cliff because houses would be overlooked, sea views would be blocked and a major tourist attraction was unsuitable for what was a "relatively quiet area" of the seafront. After taking this and other statements of support and objection into account, Brighton and Hove City Council granted temporary planning permission until May 2016 during a meeting on 27 April 2011. The council granted permission for the wheel to be open between 10:00 am and midnight each day, but Paramount subsequently changed the closing time to 11:00 pm. The structure also required a Highway Licence before it could be built, which was granted on 25 August 2011.

== Construction and opening ==
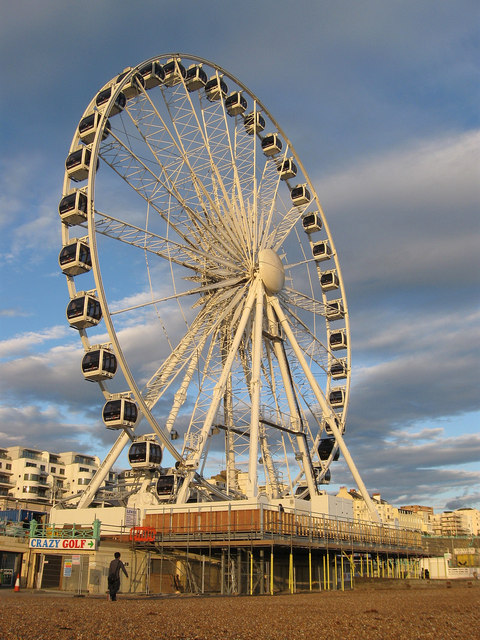
The Brighton Wheel nearing completion on 7 October 2011, with the Van Alen Building in the background

The wheel was manufactured in Germany and was transported to South Africa in 2010, where it served as a tourist attraction during the 2010 FIFA World Cup. It was shipped to England in September 2011, a month after work began on building its foundations on Madeira Drive, at a location known as Dalton's Bastion. Some railings of historic interest had to be taken out; the Regency Society stated in October 2011 that they had asked the council to keep them in good condition and re-erect them after the wheel was dismantled. The railings are part of a Grade II-listed length running along Marine Parade, built in 1880 of moulded cast iron and teak.

Installation began in September 2011, and after a period of testing, it opened to the public on 24 October 2011—the first day of the school half term. Paramount Attractions stated they hoped to attract 250,000 visitors to the wheel per year during its five-year existence.

== Closure and subsequent events ==
The council announced in June 2015 that the wheel's five-year lease would not be renewed when it ended in 2016 because of an agreement made with the operators of the Brighton i360, which was due to open that year, that there would not be two similar, competing tourist attractions in close proximity. After the wheel was dismantled, a zip line was installed close to the site. In August 2026, the council announced that a meeting scheduled for the following month would decide whether the operators of the zip line should be permitted to re-erect the wheel next summer in 2027 on its original site and be granted a 25-year lease.

== Specifications ==
Early proposals included installations of 45 metres (148 ft) and 60 metres (200 ft) in height. Subsequent conflicting reports credited the attraction as being 45 metres (148 ft), and 50 metres (160 ft) tall. The Brighton Wheel website stated that the wheel was 45 metres (148 ft) in diameter, and [had a maximum height of] 50 metres (160 ft) above sea level.

There were 35 standard gondolas, each able to carry up to six adults and two children, and one VIP gondola able to carry up to four people, giving a maximum capacity of 284 (although the typical ridership at any one time was expected to be 200). As demonstrated by its move from South Africa to England, the structure is fully transportable and its operator Paramount Attractions claimed it could be disassembled and removed in two weeks. Commentary was available on the views and buildings visible during the ride. Opening hours were 10:00 am to 11:00 pm all year, and the wheel was lit at night; the extent of the illumination was reduced from that proposed in the planning application, which included lights on the supporting struts and some flashing lights.

== Critical reception ==
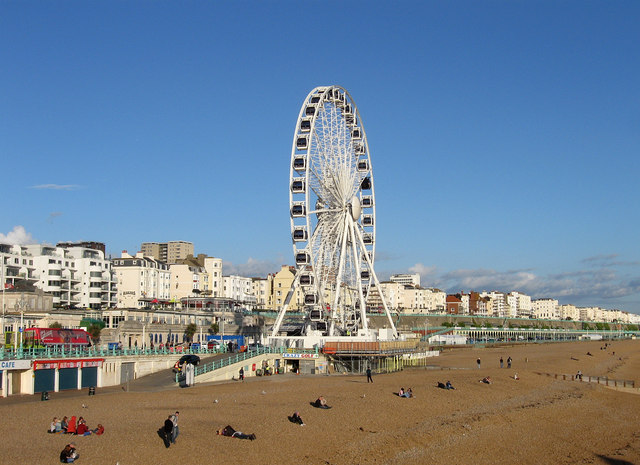
The Brighton Wheel overlooked Brighton's East Cliff

About 30 jobs were created by the opening of the Brighton Wheel, and more visitors were expected to be attracted to the city. This was praised by business and the tourist industry in the city, especially in the context of the recession. Criticism came from The Regency Society and other conservation groups, concerned at the effect it would have on nearby residential buildings and the East Cliff Conservation Area, within whose boundary it lies. They also stated that large-scale development might be encouraged in the area east of Brighton Pier, because of the precedent being set. After planning permission was granted, some opponents considered appealing at the European Court of Justice, the highest court in the European Union.

== Bibliography ==
- Antram, Nicholas; Morrice, Richard (2008). Brighton and Hove. Pevsner Architectural Guides. London: Yale University Press. ISBN 978-0-300-12661-7.
- Collis, Rose (2010). The New Encyclopaedia of Brighton. (based on the original by Tim Carder) (1st ed.). Brighton: Brighton & Hove Libraries. ISBN 978-0-9564664-0-2.
- Musgrave, Clifford (1981). Life in Brighton. Rochester: Rochester Press. ISBN 0-571-09285-3.
