= Grande Roue de Marseille =

Ferris wheel in Marseille

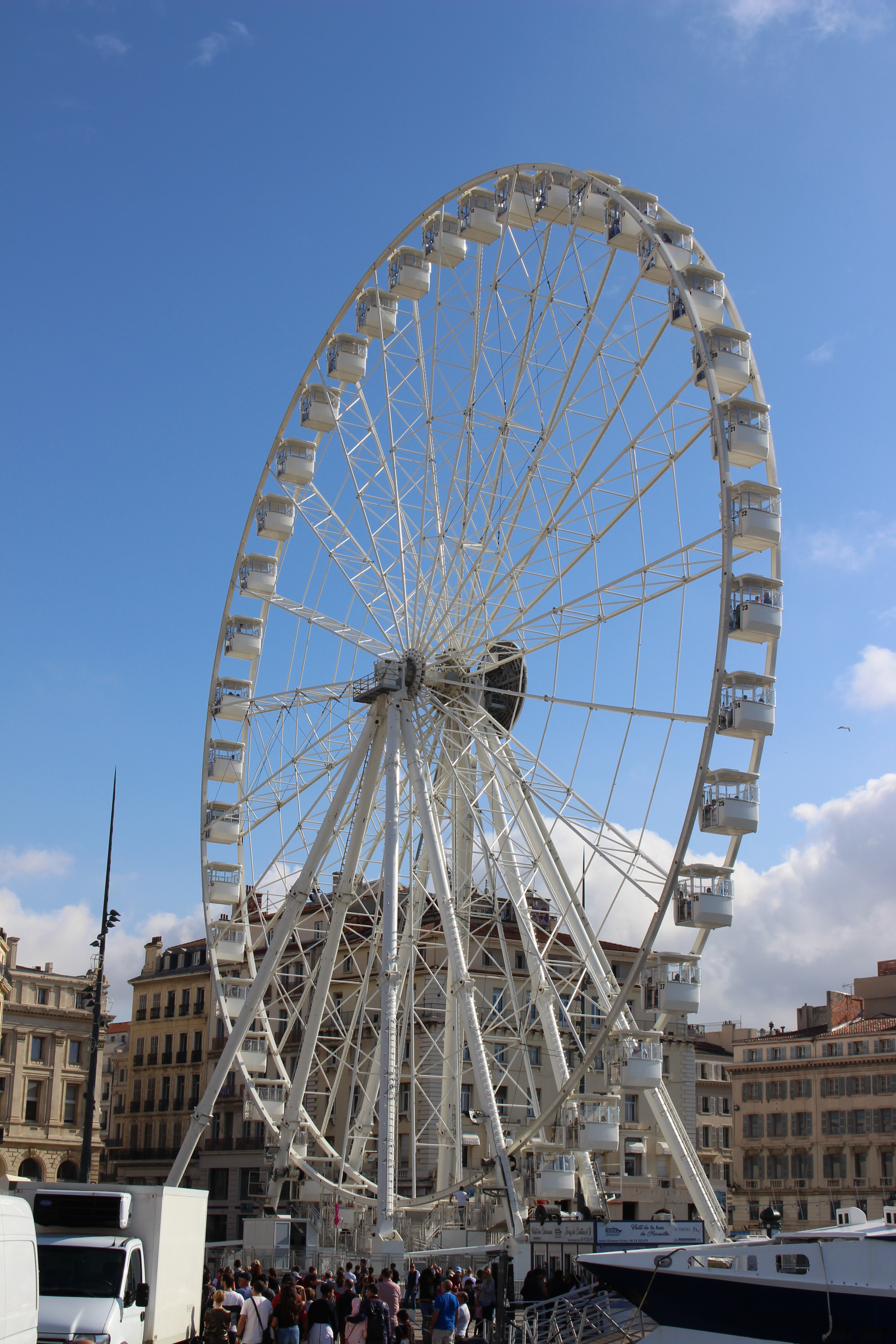

General information
- Status: Operating
- Type: Ferris wheel
- Location: Marseille, Provence-Alpes-Côte d'Azur, France
- Address: Quai de la Fraternité, 13001 Marseille
- Coordinates: 43.2957003°N 5.3720613°E
- Opened: 2009
- Owner: Tour de Lune
- Height: 55 m (180 ft)

Grande Roue de Marseille is a 55-meter tall Ferris wheel in Marseille, Provence-Alpes-Côte d'Azur. It is the second tallest Ferris wheel in France and has 42 gondola cabins. It opened to the public in 2009 and has moved multiple times between two locations of Vieux-Port (Old Port) and Escale Borély.

A 10 year-old girl was injured and suffered a broken jaw and bruises to her ear on August 19, 2019, when she allegedly stuck her head out of cabin. The operator claimed it was a disregard for safety by the occupant, not a mechanical malfunction.
