= SkyView de Pier =

Ferris wheel in Scheveningen, Netherlands

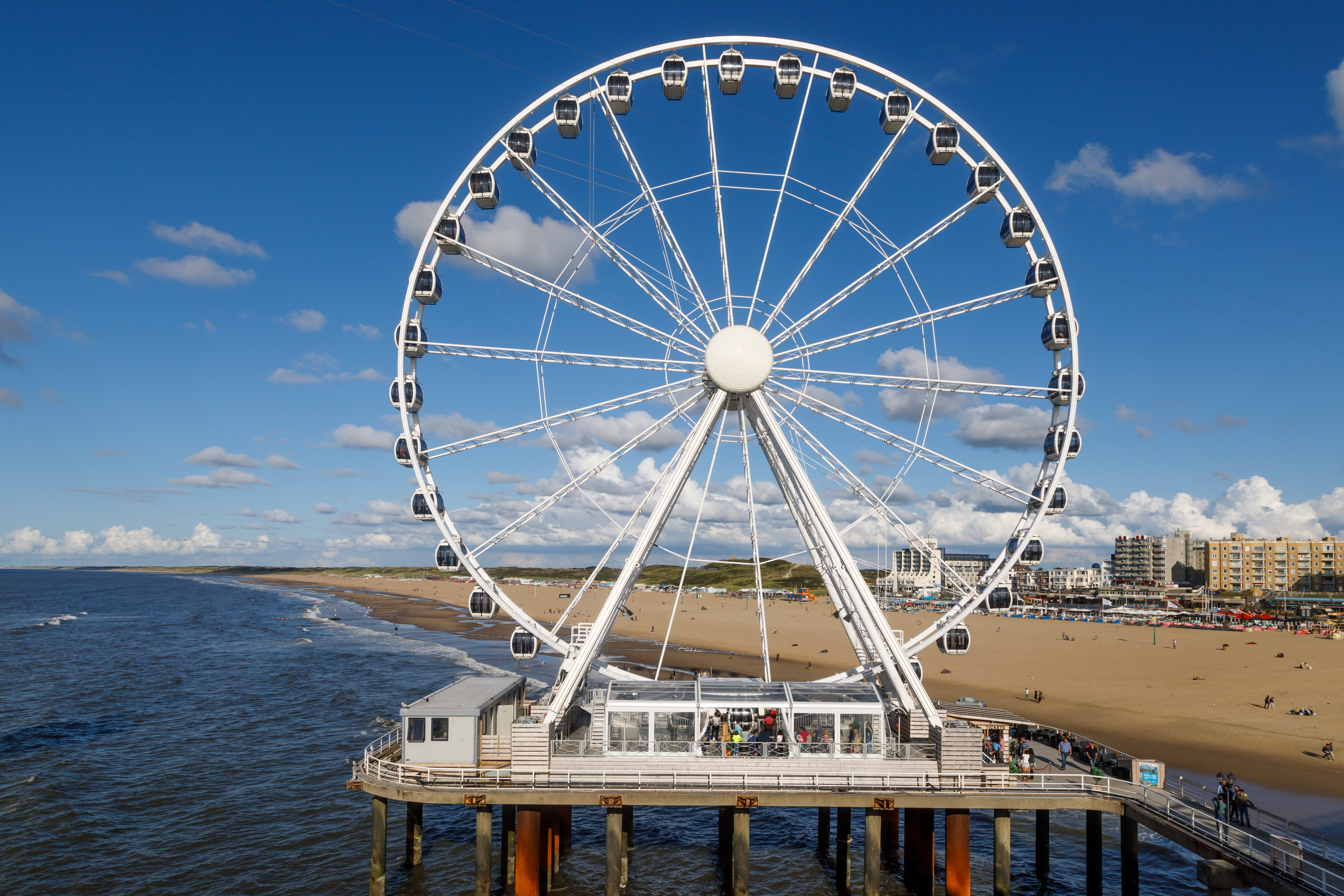

General information
- Status: Operating
- Type: Ferris wheel
- Location: Scheveningen, The Hague, Netherlands
- Address: Strandweg 156, 2586 JW Den Haag, Netherlands
- Coordinates: 52.1173537°N 4.2788422°E
- Opened: August 19, 2016; 8 years ago
- Owner: SkyView Attractions
- Height: 45 m (148 ft)

Website
- https://www.skyviewdepier.nl/

SkyView de Pier is a 45-meter tall Ferris wheel in Scheveningen, The Hague. It was the first Ferris wheel constructed over sea in Europe, as it is on the Scheveningen Pier eight meters above the North Sea. It opened to the public on August 19, 2016.

== Design ==
The Netherlands-based Dutch Wheels designed and constructed the wheel. It is a model R50SP-36. It has 36 climate controlled gondolas that can accommodate 6 people each. A dining car can be reserved for dinner or high tea. A VIP gondola features a glass floor.
