= SkyView Rotterdam =

Ferris wheel in Rotterdam

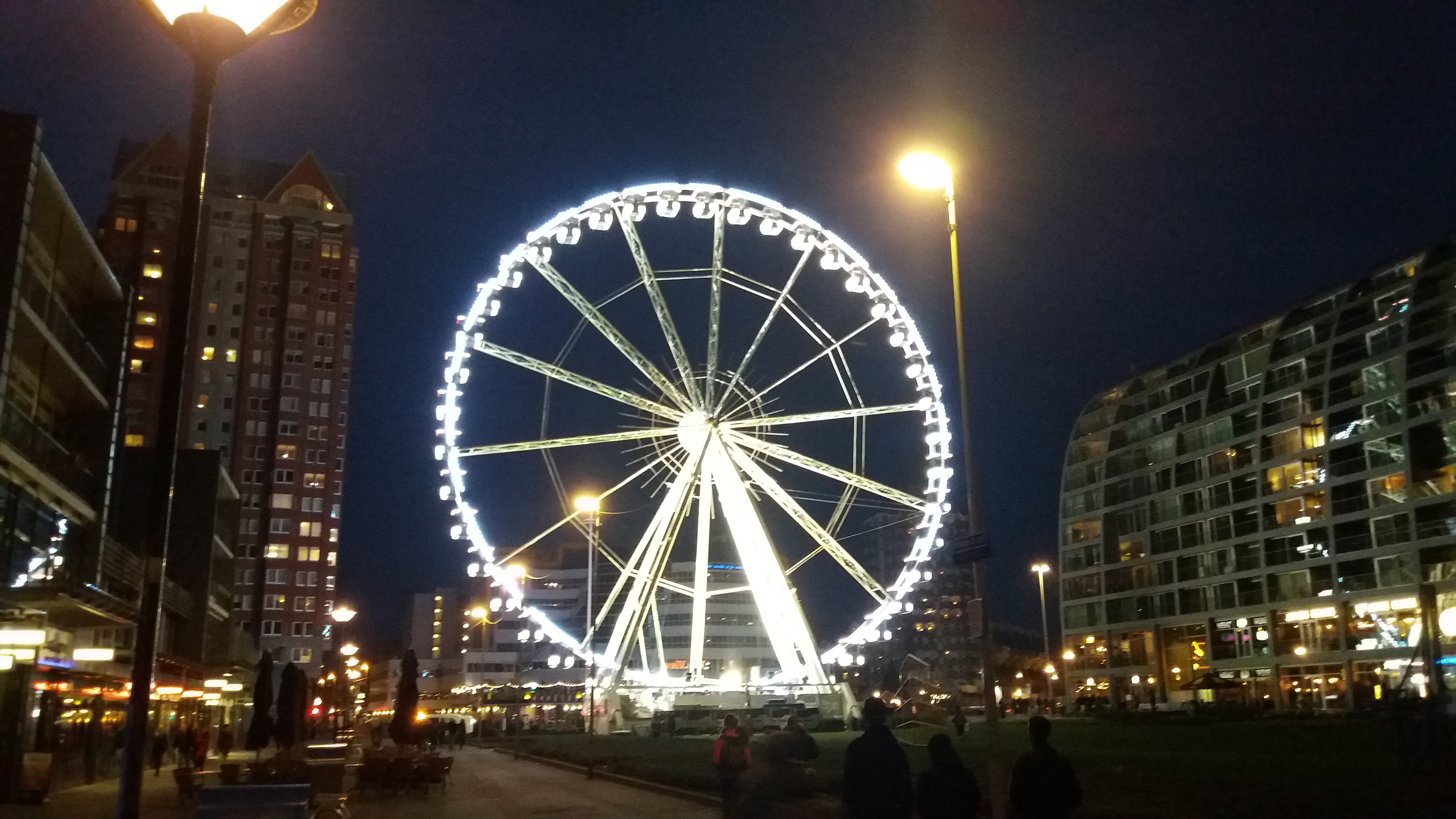

General information
- Status: Decommissioned
- Type: Ferris wheel
- Location: Rotterdam, Netherlands
- Address: Hoogstraat, 3011 HB Rotterdam, Netherlands
- Coordinates: 51.9208115°N 4.4847428°E
- Opened: 4 September 2018
- Destroyed: July 2019
- Owner: SkyView Attractions
- Height: 45 m (148 ft)

Website
- https://www.skyviewrotterdam.nl/

SkyView Rotterdam was a 45-meter-tall Ferris wheel in the center of Rotterdam. It opened to the public on September 4, 2018, and was decommissioned in July 2019. Some residents of Markthal protested its construction citing privacy concerns. It was expected to stay for five years, but operated for less than one year. It may relocate to Spain.

== Design ==
The Netherlands-based Dutch Wheels designed and constructed the wheel. It was a model R50SP-36. It had 36 climate controlled gondolas that could accommodate 6 people each. A VIP gondola featured a glass floor. A dining car was reservable for dinner or high tea, which is why it was also known as the Dinner Wheel.
