= Santo Cristo, Rio de Janeiro =

Santo Cristo
- Neighborhood
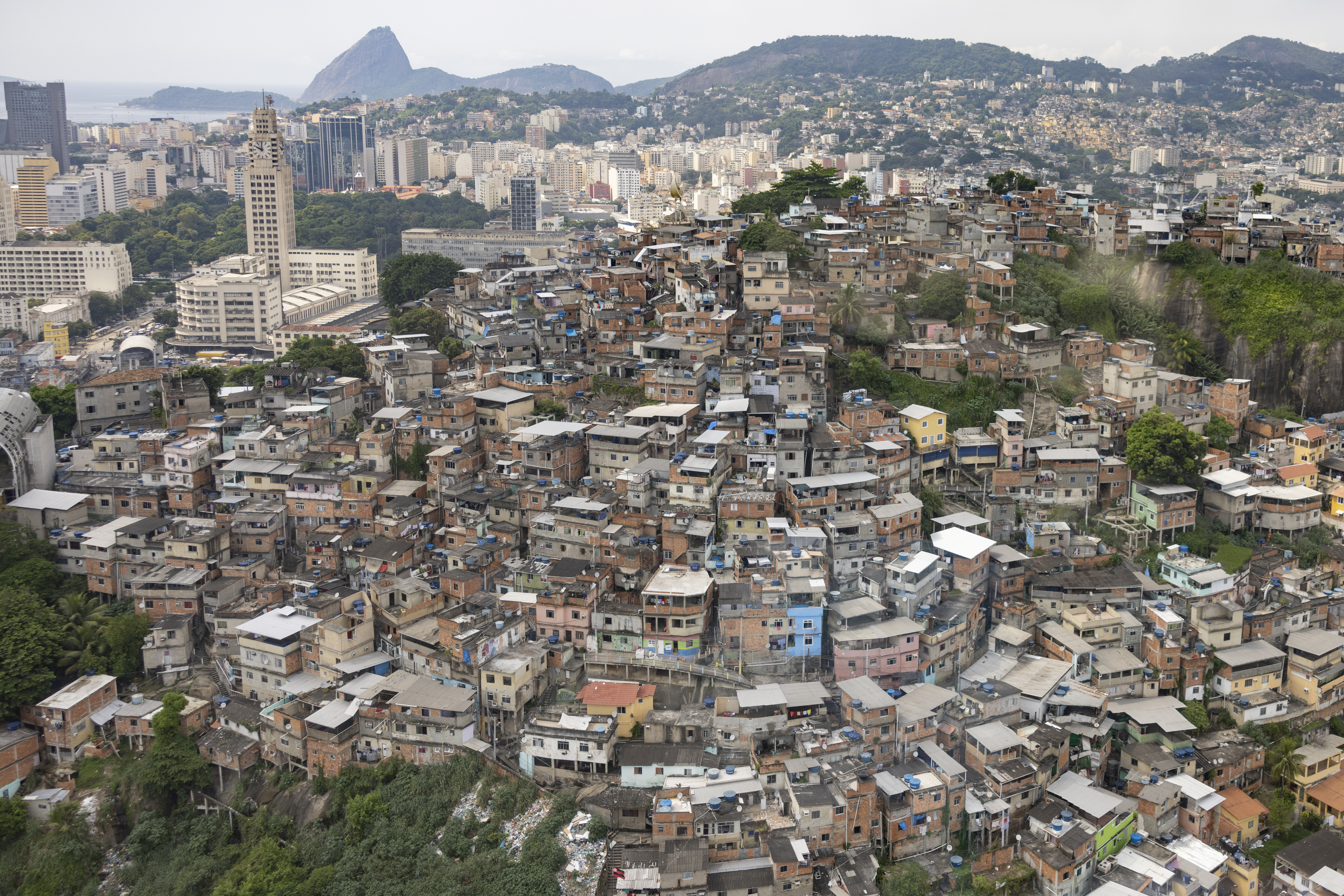

- Location in Rio de Janeiro Santo Cristo (Brazil)
- Coordinates: 22°54′33″S 43°12′18″W
- Country: Brazil
- State: Rio de Janeiro (RJ)
- Municipality/City: Rio de Janeiro
- Zone: Centro

Area
  - Total: 168.47 ha (416.3 acres)

Population (2010)
  - Total: 12,330
  - Density: 7,319/km^{2} (18,960/sq mi)

Santo Cristo is a neighborhood in Rio de Janeiro, Brazil. The neighbourhood is named after the Catholic church Santo Cristo dos Milagres ("Holy Christ of Miracles") situated in the port area.
