= Sky Dream Fukuoka =

Former ferris wheel in Japan

Coordinates: 33.5956845°N 130.3225279°E

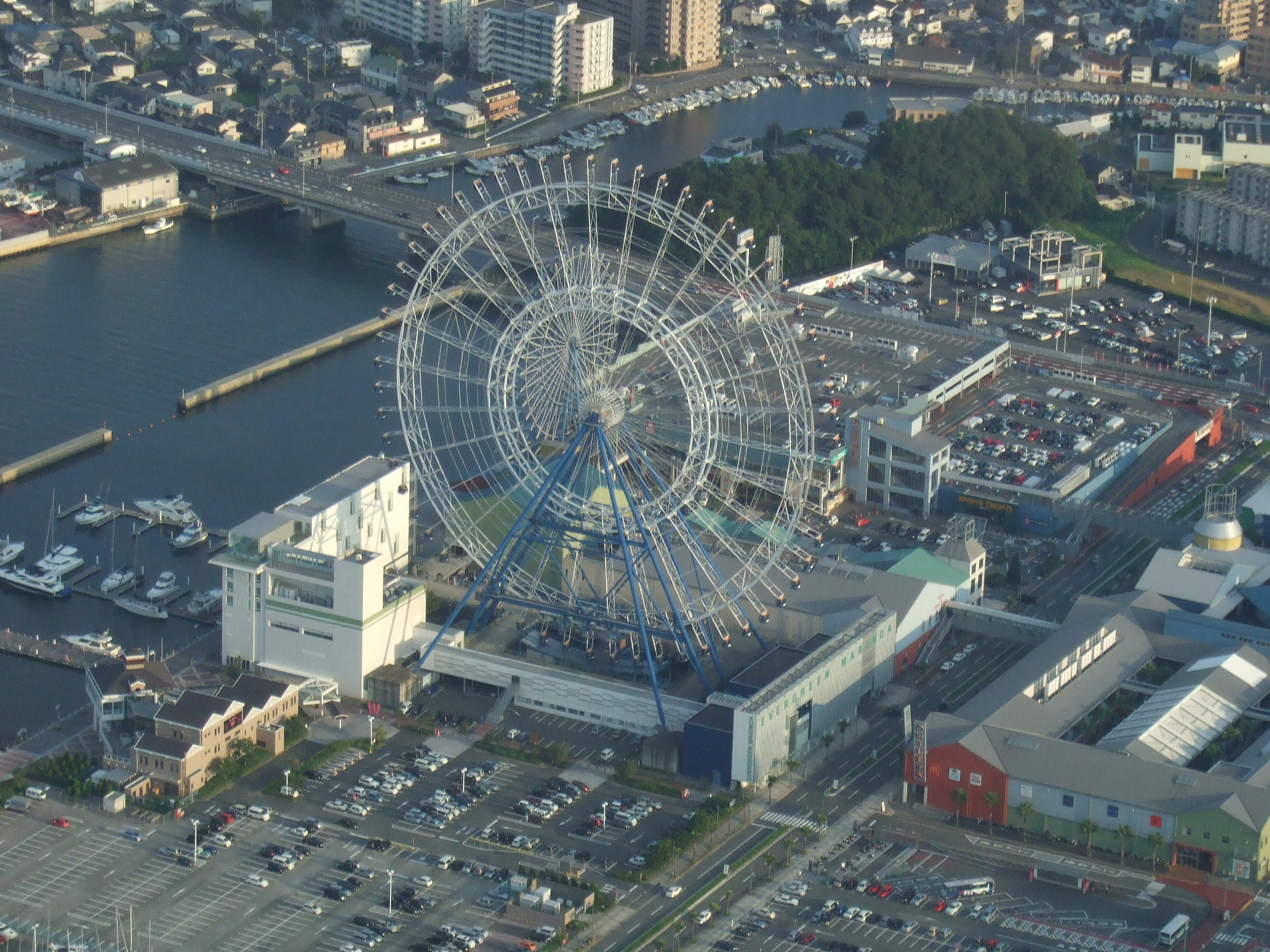
Sky Dream Fukuoka, September 2009

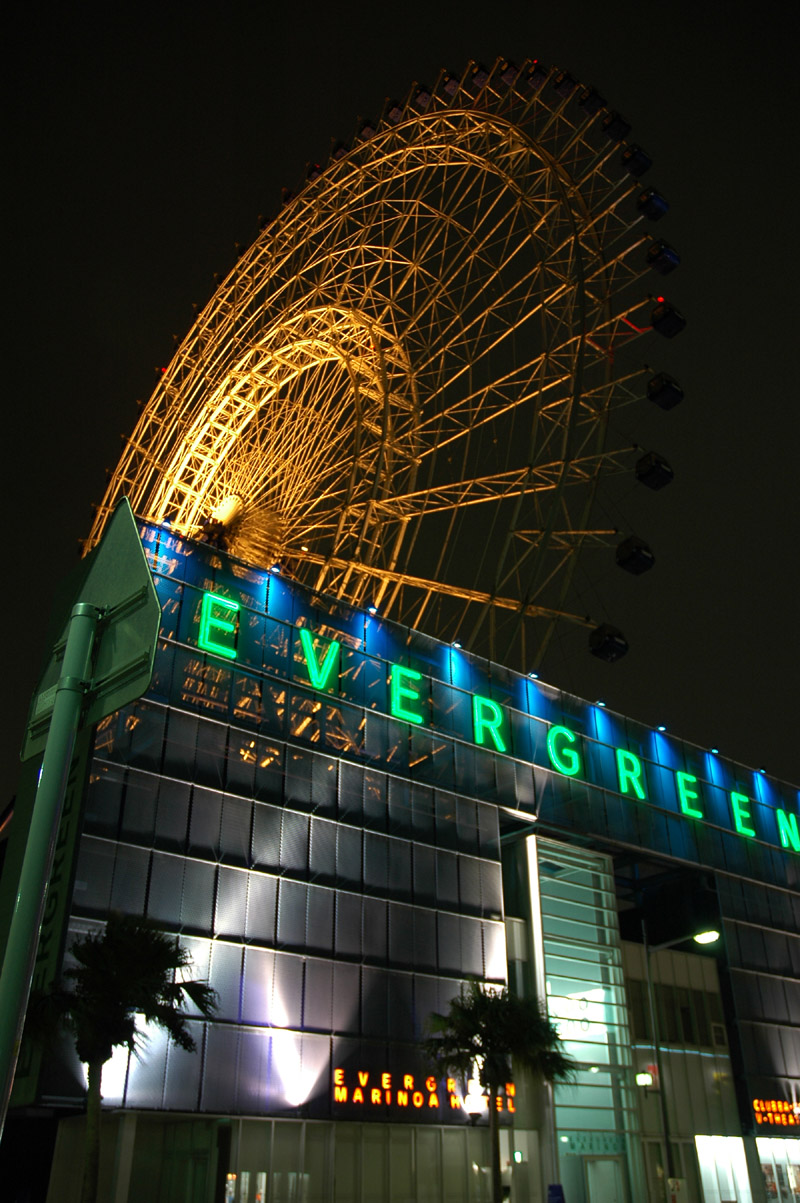
Sky Dream and the Evergreen Marinoa at Night, January 2006

Sky Dream Fukuoka (Japanese: スカイドリームフクオカ) was a 120-metre-tall giant Ferris wheel in the city of Fukuoka, Japan, operating from December 2001 until September 2009. It was 120 metres (390 ft) tall, making it the tallest Ferris wheel in Japan during its years of operation. It was located in the Evergreen Marinoa (Japanese: エバーグリーンマリノア) entertainment facility adjacent to the Marinoa City Fukuoka mall, which itself features a smaller, 58-metre-tall ferris wheel.

The gondolas were air-conditioned and wheelchair accessible, with one full rotation taking approximately 20 minutes.

Sky Dream Fukuoka was constructed to revitalize Fukuoka's infrastructure and boost the city's cultural tourism industry. Promoted as one of Japan's tallest Ferris wheels, it aimed to stimulate significant economic growth through tourism revenue. Upon its opening, Sky Dream Fukuoka quickly became a popular landmark and tourist attraction.

Sky Dream Fukuoka eventually faced financial challenges soon after, where visitors have declined over time. The Sky Dream Fukuoka initially gained popularity over their slow pacing of the wheel rotation, where Sky Dream Fukuoka advertised the slow pacing of the Ferris wheel as a selling point that provides a longer amount of time for visitors to observe the landscape and spend time with their loved ones inside the capsule. However, the following selling feature didn’t appeal to their customers as more Ferris wheels from Western countries adopted more thrilling & fast-paced Ferris wheels that have risen in popularity. Moreover, because the Ferris wheel was big, it required expensive maintenance work to keep the Sky Dream Fukuoka in operation. But as the passenger numbers of Sky Dream Fukuoka were declining over time, generating enough revenue to fulfill the maintenance cost & profit was predicted to be unviable. Therefore, the Evergreen Group (owner of the Sky Dream Fukuoka) has decided to close the Sky Dream Fukuoka permanently.

Sky Dream Fukuoka closed on 26 September 2009. It was subsequently sold to a Taiwanese company for rebuilding at Lihpao Land in Taiwan. Dismantling work commenced in 2010, although work was disrupted in July 2011 when supports failed, causing two cranes involved in dismantling to topple over, injuring one workman and damaging four cars.
