= Lihpao Land =

Theme park in Houli, Taichung, Taiwan

Lihpao Resort 麗寶樂園度假區
- Previously known as Yamay Recreation World, Yamay Discovery World
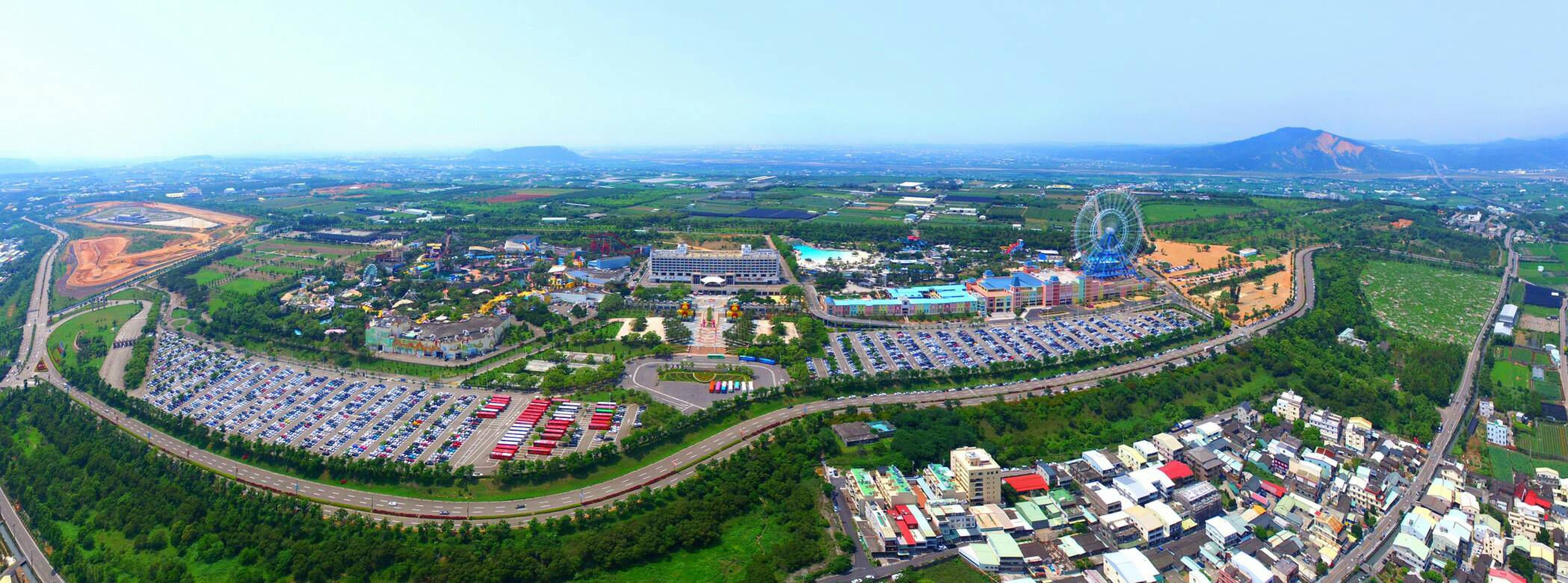
- Interactive map of Lihpao Resort 麗寶樂園度假區
- Location: 8, Fullon Road, Houli, Taichung, Taiwan
- Coordinates: 24°19′21″N 120°41′44″E
- Status: Operating
- Opened: July 1998
- Owner: Yamay International Development Corp.
- Operated by: Lihpao Construction Company
- Area: 200 ha (490 acres)
- Website: lihpaoresort.com/..

Lihpao Resort (Chinese: 麗寶樂園度假區; pinyin: Lì bǎo lèyuán dùjià qū) is a theme park located in Houli District, Taichung, Taiwan.

It currently has two roller coasters, including Gravity Max, the world's first coaster to feature a true 90-degree drop and the world's first tilt coaster. Besides Gravity Max, Lihpao Land has several themed areas with varied attractions, such as the Mine Express roller coaster, the Hook (a pirate ship ride), and the Wild Flume Adventure, a reversing log flume attraction.

== History ==
The site where the theme park sits today used to be a ranch owned by Taiwan Sugar Corporation. The theme park was originally established in July 1998 as Yamay Recreation World or Yamay Discovery World. It was renamed to Lihpao Land in 2012.

== Architecture ==
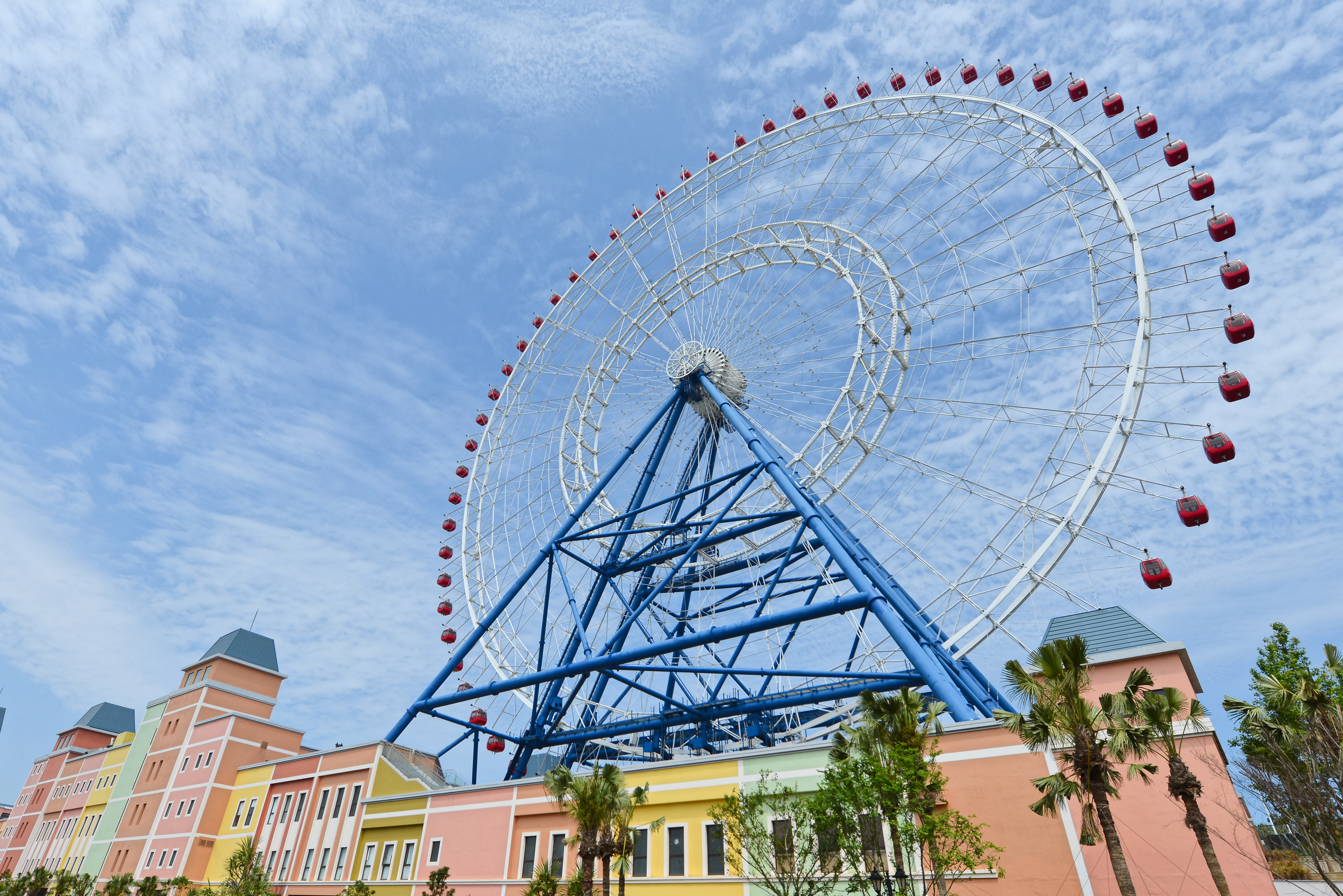
Sky Dream

- Discovery Walk
- D Street
- Enchanted Forest
- Fairy Tale Village
- Palace of Dreams
- Yamay Island
- Sky Dream - Taiwan's tallest ferris wheel, at 394 feet (120 m)

== Transportation ==
The theme park is accessible by bus from Fengyuan Station of Taiwan Railway.

== See also ==
- List of tourist attractions in Taiwan
