= Tianjin Eye =

Ferris wheel in Tianjin, China

The Tientsin Eye
- 天津之眼
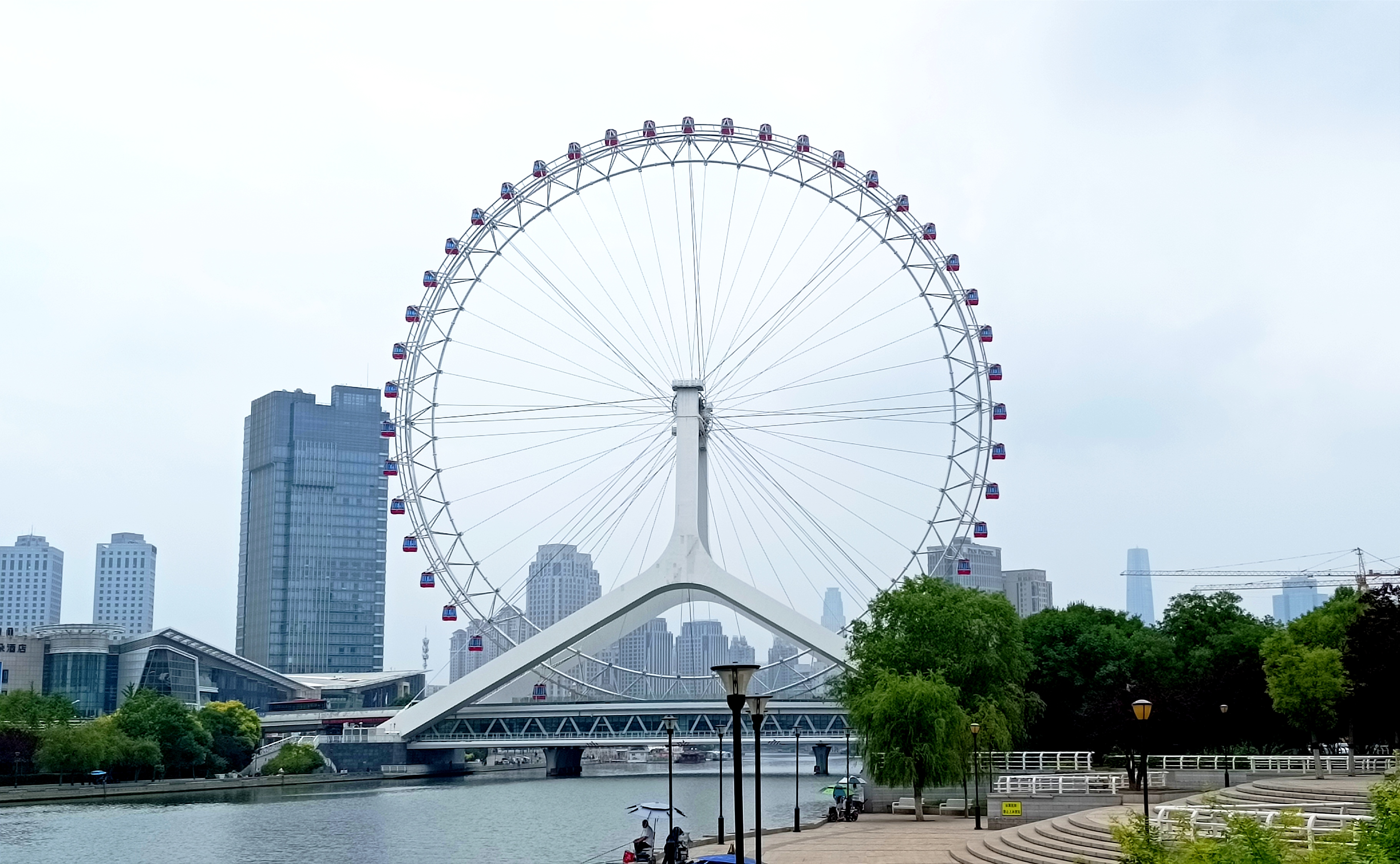
- Interactive map of the The Tientsin Eye area
- Alternative names: "The Tientsin Eye" Ferris Wheel 天津之眼摩天轮

General information
- Type: Ferris wheel
- Location: Yongle Bridge, Tianjin, China
- Coordinates: 39.1533636°N 117.1802616°E
- Completed: 2007

Height
- Height: 120 m (394 ft)

Dimensions
- Diameter: 110 m (361 ft)

Design and construction
- Main contractor: Shanghai Amusement Machine Engineering Co. Ltd.

Other information
- Number of units: 48 passenger capsules

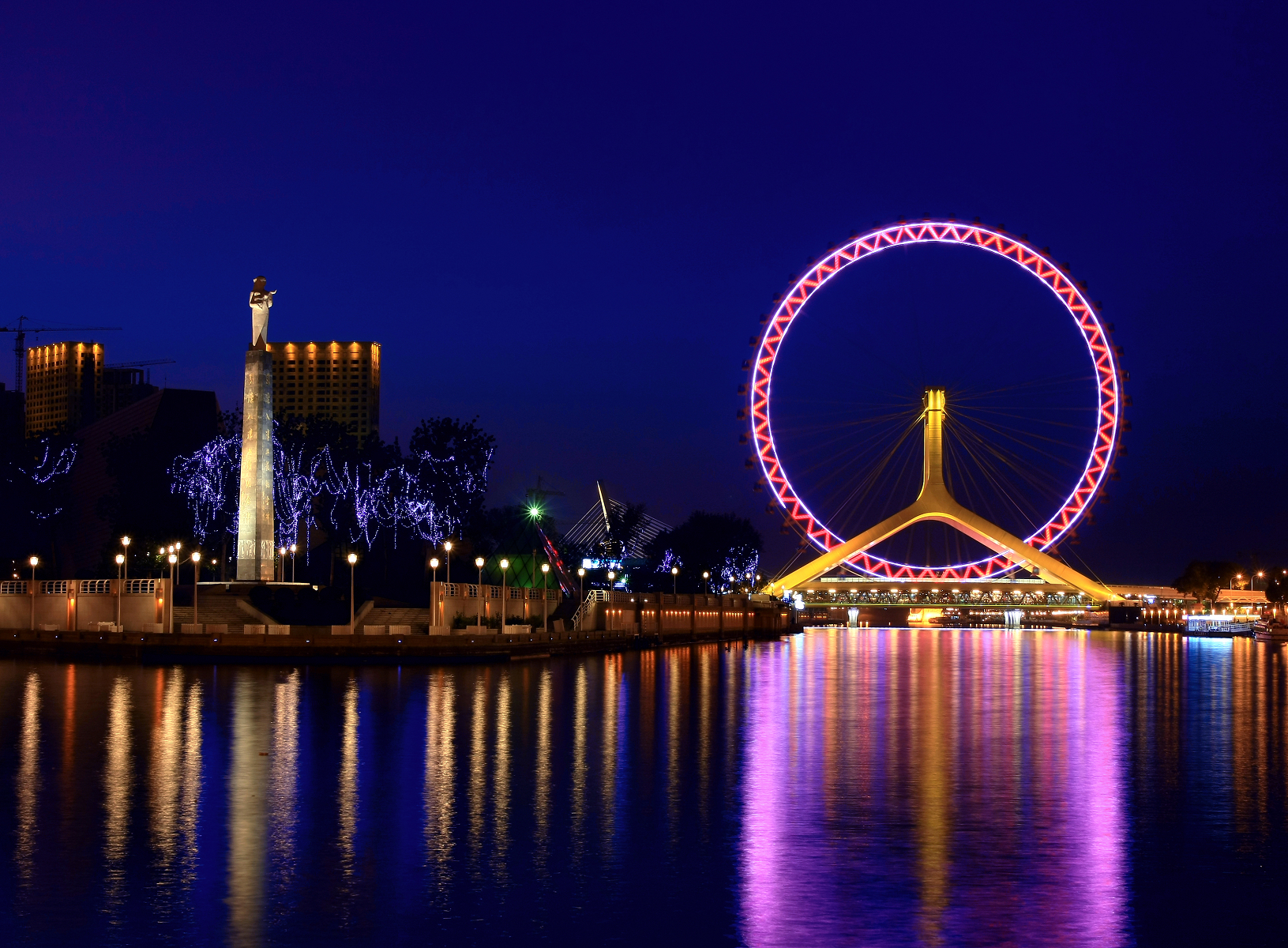
Tianjin Eye

Tianjin Eye, officially The Tientsin Eye, is a 120-meter (394 ft)-tall giant Ferris wheel built above the Yongle Bridge (formerly Chihai Bridge), over the Hai River in Tianjin, China.

Construction started in 2007, with completion of the main body on 18 December 2007, and the wheel opened to the public on 7 April 2008.

At the time of its completion, only the 135 m (443 ft) London Eye, 160 m (525 ft) Star of Nanchang, and 165 m (541 ft) Singapore Flyer were taller.

Tianjin Eye is electrically powered and has 48 passenger capsules, each able to carry 8 passengers, and takes 30 minutes to complete a rotation, giving a maximum capacity of 768 passengers per hour.
