= Star of Nanchang =

Coordinates: 28.659332°N 115.845568°E

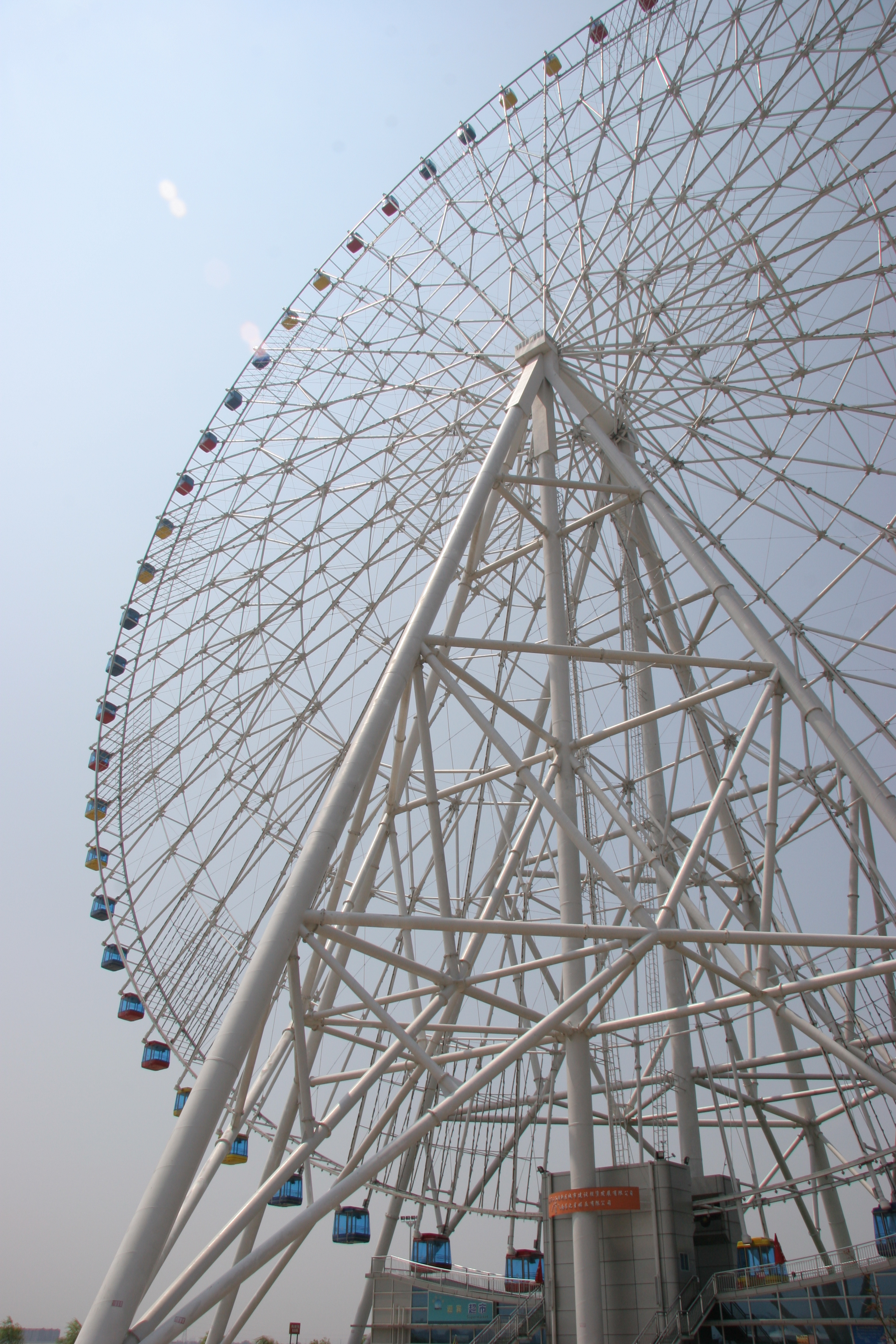
- Interactive map of the Star of Nanchang area

General information
- Type: Ferris wheel
- Location: Nanchang, Jiangxi, China

Height
- Height: 160 m (525 ft)

Dimensions
- Diameter: 153 m (502 ft)

The Star of Nanchang (Chinese: 南昌之星 or simplified Chinese: 南昌之星摩天轮; traditional Chinese: 南昌之星摩天輪) is a 160-meter (525 ft)-tall Ferris wheel located in the eastern Chinese city of Nanchang, the capital of Jiangxi Province.

The Star of Nanchang opened for business in May 2006, having cost 57 million yuan (roughly $7.3 million) to build. Formerly the world's tallest Ferris wheel, it was succeeded by the 165-meter (541 ft)-tall Singapore Flyer which officially opened to the public on March 1, 2008.

The Star of Nanchang has 60 enclosed air-conditioned gondolas, each carrying up to 8 passengers, for a maximum capacity of 960 passengers per hour. A single rotation takes approximately 30 minutes; the slow rotation speed allows passengers to embark and disembark without the wheel having to stop turning.

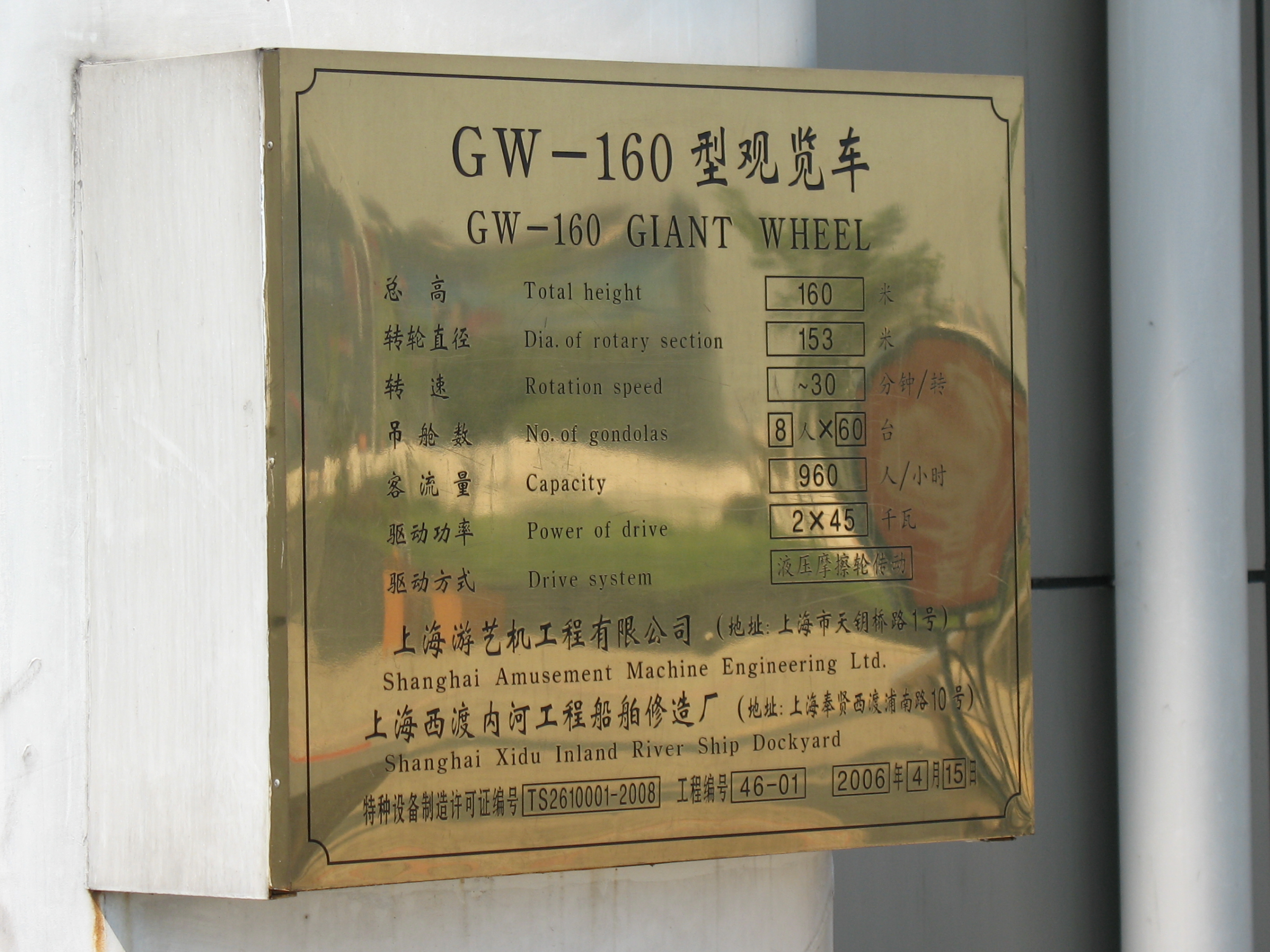
Manufacturer's specifications plaque

Preceded by London Eye	World's tallest Ferris wheel 2006–2008	Succeeded by Singapore Flyer
