= The Peel Centre, Stockport =

Shopping centre in Stockport, England

The Peel Centre
- Location: Stockport, England
- Coordinates: 53°24′50″N 2°09′05″W
- Address: Great Portwood Street, Stockport, Greater Manchester, SK1 2HH
- Opened: 1980s
- Manager: Peel Land and Property; Savills (Agents)
- Owner: The Peel Group
- Num. of stores: 20
- Num. of anchor tenants: 3
- Floor area: 230,000 sq ft (21,000 m^{2})
- Floors: Varies
- Parking: 1,057
- Website: Official website

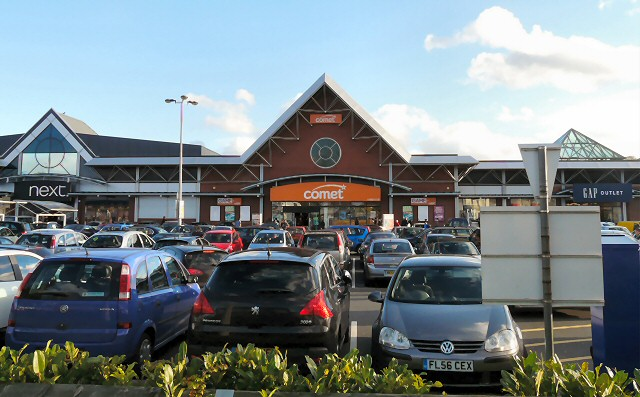
Comet shop at The Peel Centre, Stockport in 2012

The Peel Centre, also known as Stockport Retail Park, is a retail park located in Stockport, Greater Manchester, England. It is owned by The Peel Group and in 2010 extended to 230,000 sq ft (21,000 m^{2}) across 20 units. Nearby town centre shopping areas include the Merseyway Shopping Centre.

== History ==
The site on which the park stands has had a variety of different usages over time, it previously had industry and housing. It then contained a power station and gasworks, and then had a variety of industrial usages, it was only developed in its current form from the late 1980s onwards. It was constructed in phases with the latter phases being those at the eastern side.

== Controversy ==
There is extensive car parking at the centre where there has been controversy over wrongly issued parking fines, it is mainly pay and display, and is close to the town's major supermarkets.

== Nearby developments ==
Immediately adjacent to The Peel Centre, across the road is a smaller development, Portwood Court.

In 2003, IKEA announced plans to open a store on the other side of the Portwood roundabout and M60 motorway, but were denied planning permission, and after numerous appeals they were finally turned down in 2005 by the then Deputy Prime Minister John Prescott.
