= The Peel Group =

UK property investment business

- Type: Private company
- Industry: Infrastructure; Property; Ports
- Founder: John Whittaker
- Headquarters: Venus Building, Trafford Park
- Key people: John Whittaker (Chairman) (2022)
- Total assets: £2.3 billion (2022)
- Owner: Whittaker family 68%; Olayan Group 25%
- Website: peel.co.uk

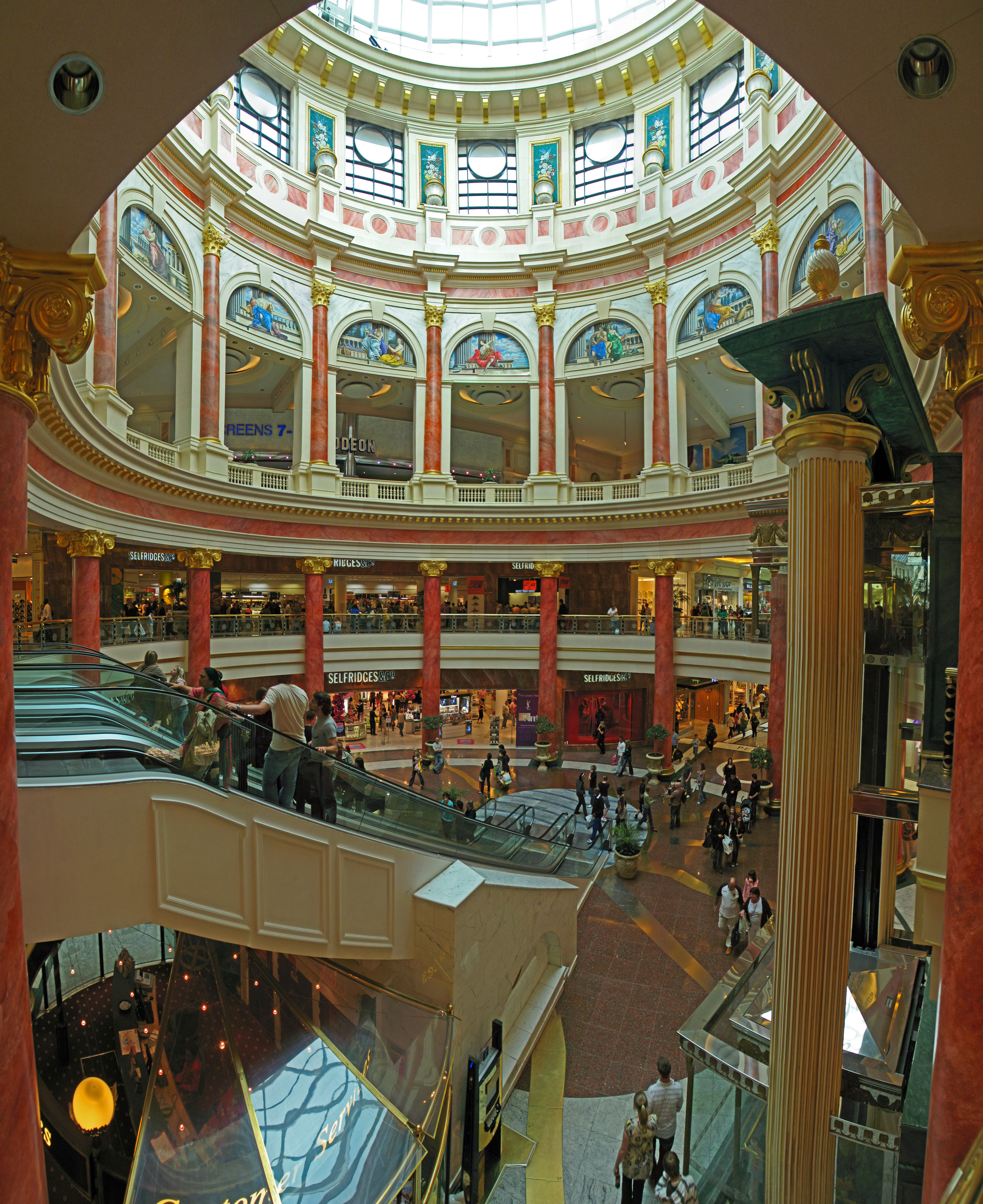
Trafford Centre Atrium, 2007

The Peel Group is a British infrastructure and property investment business, based in Manchester. In 2022, its Peel Land and Property estate extends to 13 million square feet (1.2 km^{2}) of buildings, and over 33,000 acres (13,000 ha) of land and water. Peel retains minority stakes in its former ports business and MediaCityUK.

The Trafford Centre, which opened in 1998, is widely regarded as Peel's landmark development. It was sold in 2011 to Capital Shopping Centres for £1.6 billion, making it then the most expensive acquisition in British property history. £700 million of the consideration was in shares and Peel continued to buy shares in the purchaser that went into administration, eliminating share value, in 2020.

The Peel Group held a series of other substantial investments in listed businesses including Land Securities Group plc and Pinewood Shepperton plc, and in 2022 owns 14.1% of Harworth Group plc.

== History ==
=== Name and listings ===
The Peel Group was known from 1973 to 1981 as Peel Mills (Holdings) Ltd; from 1981 to 2004 as Peel Holdings plc, and then the wider organisation took its present form.

Inspired by the Peel Tower near his native Bury, Whittaker retained the name Peel Mills Ltd for his property and cotton business.

After a period on the Manchester Stock Exchange, Peel Holdings listed on the London Stock Exchange Official List in 1983. It transferred to the Alternative Investment Market in January 2000 before the Whittaker family and The Olayan Group majority shareholders bought out Peel Holdings' 6.63% minority shareholders in 2004, taking the business private.

=== Early acquisitions ===
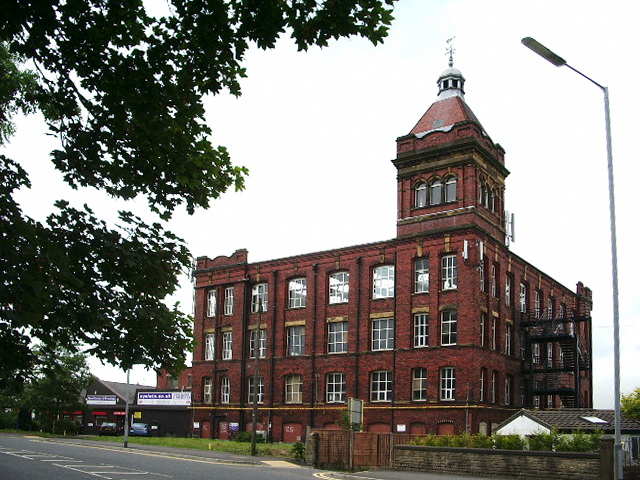
John Bright's Fieldhouse Mill, Rochdale - 2007

John Whittaker began assembling the business in the 1960s, supplying aggregate from his family's quarries to projects such as the M63 motorway.

Once quarries were exhausted he turned them into landfill waste sites, the profits invested in cotton businesses with property assets. He consolidated the cotton processing in new buildings, often built on top of the now full landfill sites, and redeveloped the former cotton mills as light industrial units to let. By 1977 a majority of the firm's activity was property development, and by the early 1980s that was predominantly new-build, industrial units and out-of-town retail stores.

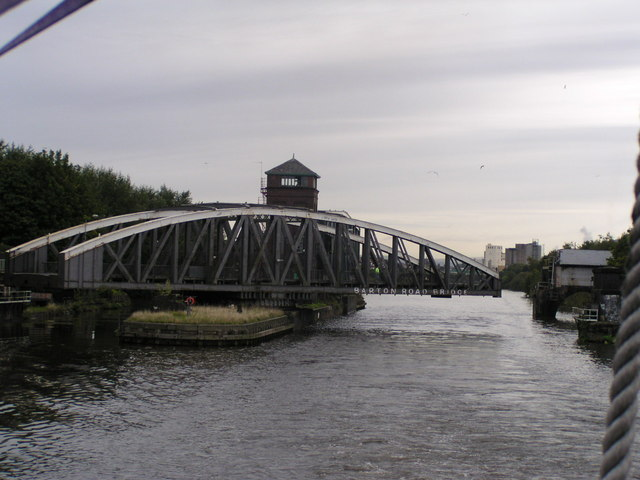
Barton Road Bridge on Manchester Ship Canal, 2005

1973	Purchase of Peel Mills in Bury.
1984	Planning permission granted for Blackburn Peel Centre retail park on the site of Whitebirk power station.
1984	Purchase of Bridgewater Estates
1987	Purchase of John Bright's former Fieldhouse Mill in Rochdale.
1988	The Peel Centre, Stockport first developed on the site of the former Stockport power station.
1988	Boundary Post Ltd acquired in return for The Olayan Group being issued 1/4 of the shares in Peel Holdings plc.
1989	Purchase of London Shop Ltd, the former London Shop Property Trust plc.

=== Manchester Ship Canal ===
From 1971, Whittaker acquired shares in the Manchester Ship Canal Company that unlike most other British canals had not been nationalised post-World War II.

Peel sold its cotton business for £22 million to finance the purchase of more canal shares and in 1986 proposed developing an out-of-town shopping centre, that would become the Trafford Centre, on the company's land.

Manchester City Council still had a stake in the canal but now faced a conflict of interest as both a local planning authority and shareholder. Its minority shareholding also no longer gave it any real control over the company. Accordingly, in 1986 it surrendered the right to appoint all but one of the Manchester Ship Canal's directors, and sold its shares to Whittaker for £10 million.

By 1987 he had acquired control of the business and bought out the remaining minority shareholders in 1993.

=== Trafford Centre ===
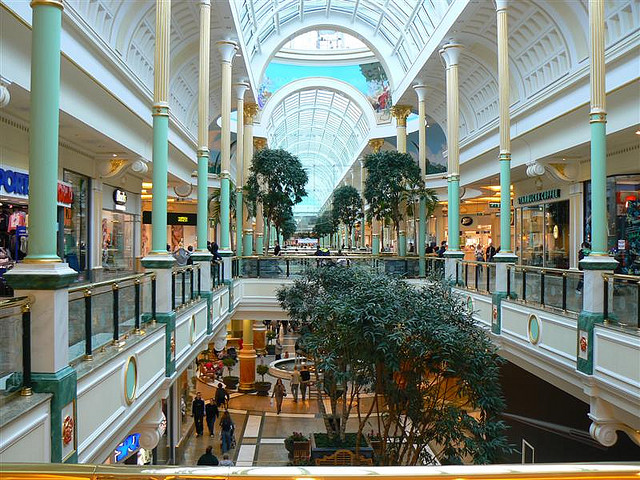
Trafford Centre, 2007

In 1987, Peel submitted a planning application for a shopping centre development on land attached to the Manchester Ship Canal, adjacent to the M63, now the M60, in Trafford. It opened in 1998 after one of the most prolonged and expensive planning processes in British history.

It sold the Trafford Centre in January 2011 to Capital Shopping Centres for £1.6bn of which £700 million was in shares, being 20% of the purchaser's share capital. Peel continued to purchase shares after the transaction and was the largest shareholder in 2012, with a stake of 24.63%. In 2020, Capital Shopping Centres, now renamed Intu Properties plc, went into administration eliminating shareholder value.

=== Airports ===
1997	Peel purchases a 76% share in Liverpool Airport, and goes on to buy out the remaining, minority shareholders in 2001. Peel renamed it Liverpool John Lennon Airport.
1999	RAF Finningley purchased and redeveloped as Robin Hood Airport, later known as Doncaster Sheffield Airport.
2002	Sheffield City Airport purchased, shut down and subsequently developed as a business park.
2003	75% stake in Teesside International Airport purchased for £500,000. Ownership of the remaining 25% retained by local councils. Peel rename it Durham Tees Valley Airport.
2010	Vantage Airport Group buys a 65% share of Peel's airport businesses. Peel repurchased Vantage's share of Teesside International Airport in February 2012; Doncaster Sheffield Airport in December 2012, and Liverpool John Lennon Airport in April 2014.
2002	Barton Aerodrome purchased by a joint venture including Peel and subsequently renamed City Airport Manchester.
2018	Peel sells its investment in Teesside Airport back to local councils for £40 million. The price included sites identified by Peel for housing on land adjacent to the airport.
2019	Peel sells down its stake in Liverpool John Lennon Airport from 80% to 45%. The purchaser was Ancala Partners. Liverpool City Council also reduced its holding from 20% to 10%
2022	Doncaster Sheffield Airport closed to traffic in November.

=== Ports ===
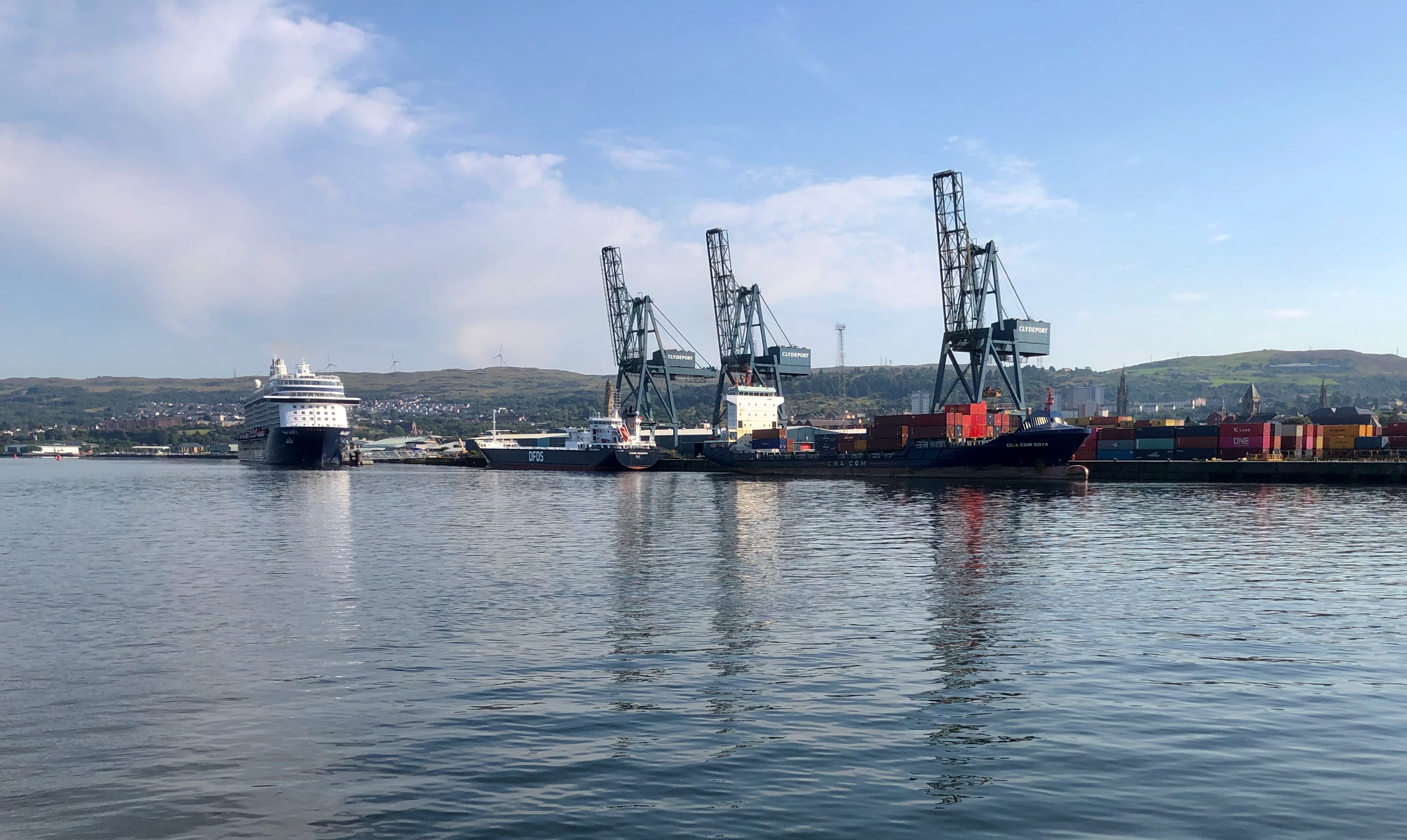
Greenock Ocean Terminal; cruise ship at pontoon berth, and Clydeport container cranes at main quay, 2022

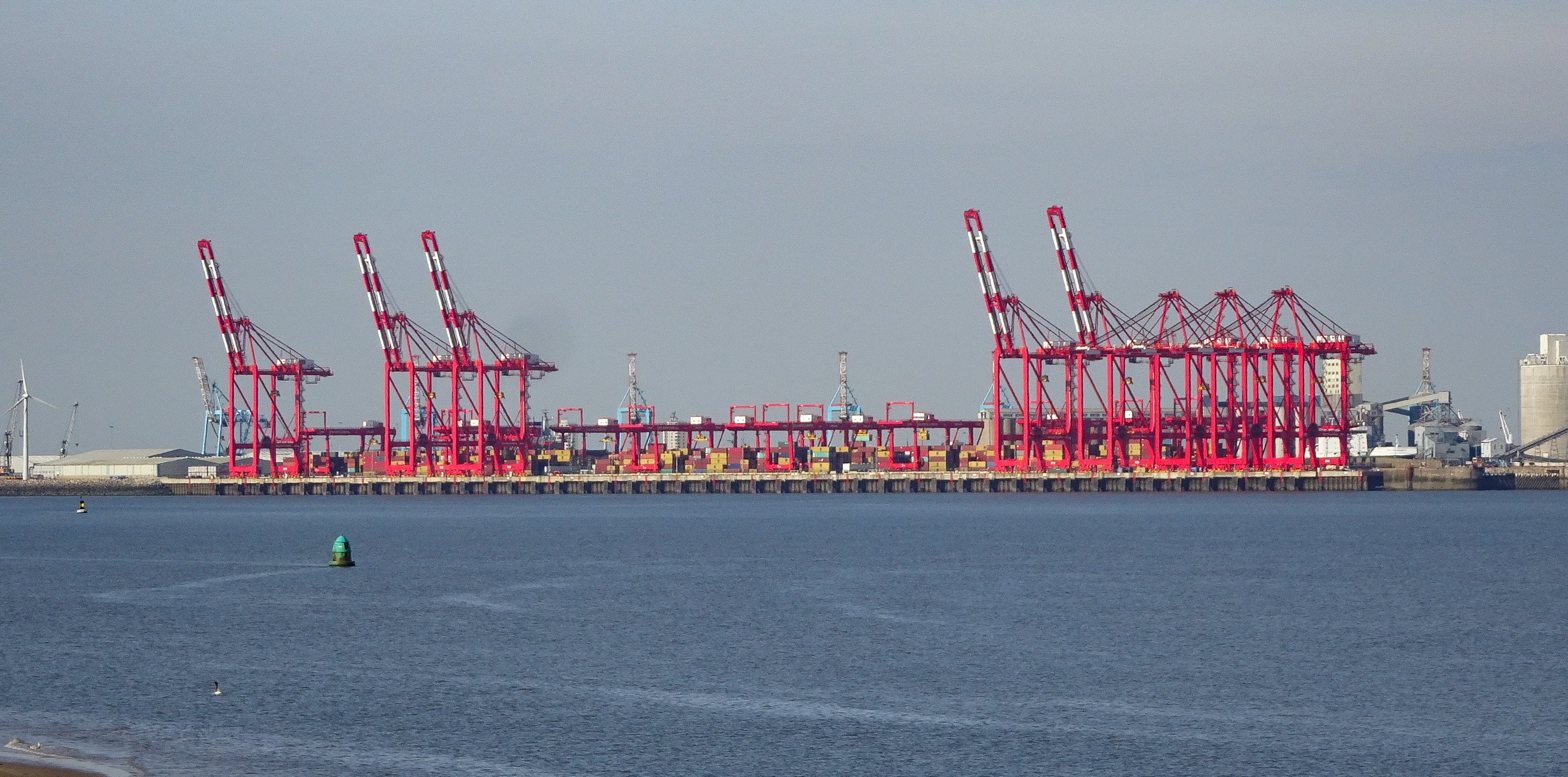
Liverpool2 deep water container port, 2020

1987	Peel acquires control of the Manchester Ship Canal, and buys out remaining minority shareholders in 1993.
2003	Purchase of Clydeport; statutory authority for the River and Firth of Clyde, and owner of ports including King George V Dock, Glasgow, Greenock Ocean Terminal, Ardrossan harbour and Hunterston Terminal.
2005	Mersey Docks and Harbour Company purchased including ownership of Heysham Port, Medway Ports and Dublin container port, and management of Belfast Victoria Terminal 3.
2006	Deutsche Bank's RREEF purchased a 49.9% holding in Peel's ports division for £775 million. The stake was sold to Pension fund APG; Global Infrastructure Partners, and AustralianSuper in 2021.
2007	Peel purchase the Birkenhead shipyard occupied by Cammell Laird.
2015	Peel acquire Great Yarmouth Outer Harbour.
2015	Peel lose management contract at Belfast Victoria Terminal 3.
2016	Liverpool2 deep water container port opened.
2016	Port Salford opened.
2011	Peel buy 50% of A&P Group which owns ship repair and conversion docks on the Tyne, Tees and at Falmouth. The remaining 50% was bought by investors in Cammell Laird.
2021	62.4% of Peel's port business owned by Pension fund APG; Global Infrastructure Partners, and AustralianSuper.
2022	Peel Land and Property promote closure of Chatham Docks to make way for 3,625 new homes, and commercial uses. It argued the cost of refurbishing the dock gates was not economic.

=== MediaCityUK ===
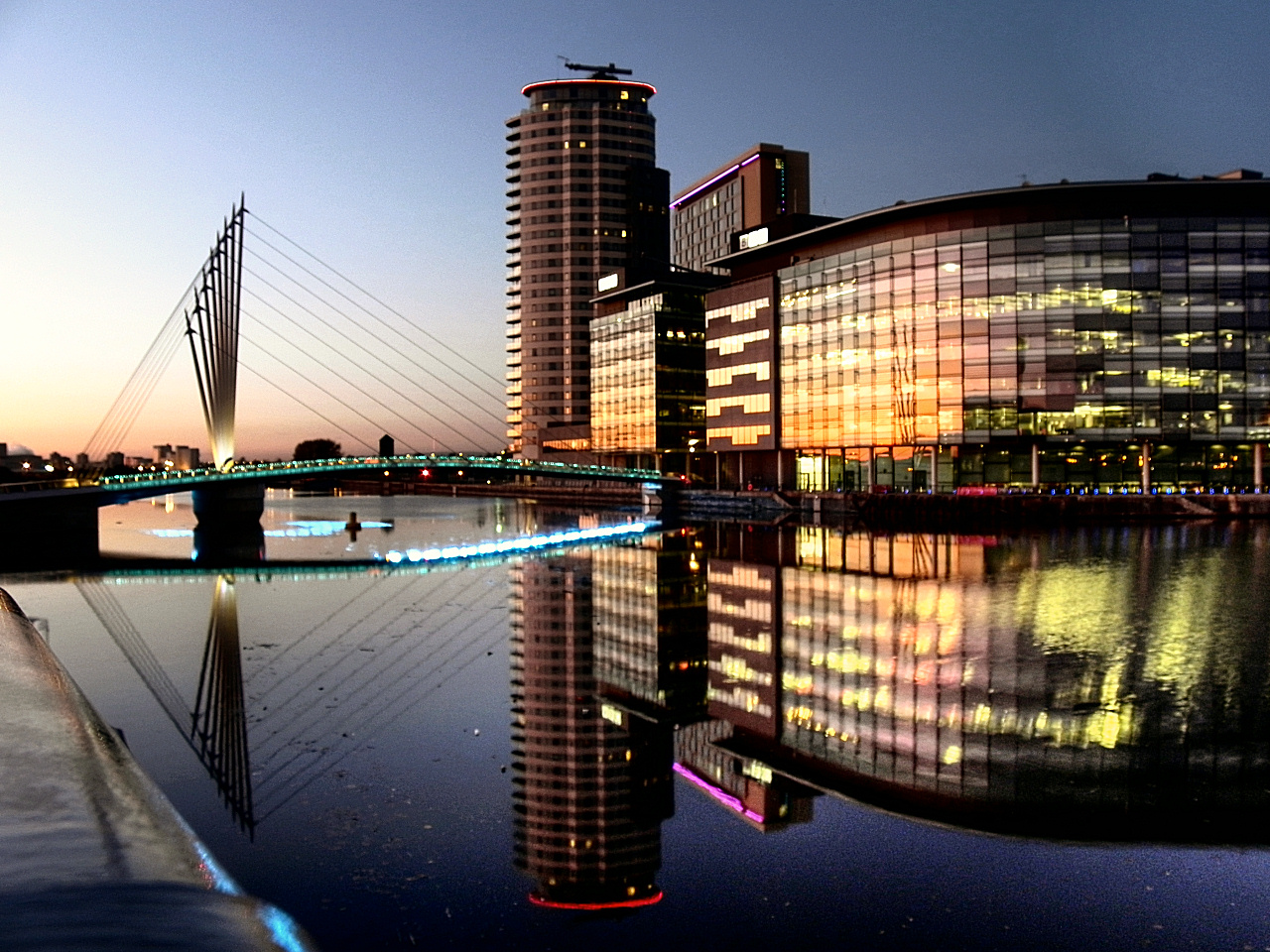
Media City Footbridge and BBC building, 2011

In 2007, Peel obtained planning permission to develop a 37 acres (15 ha) site on the banks of the Manchester Ship Canal in Salford. It became the new home of the BBC in the north of England. Other studios in the complex include Peel Group operated dock10; ITV's northern facilities including those for Coronation Street, and the University of Salford.

Plans for a £1bn expansion to MediaCityUK were approved in 2016. The development would double the size and include more TV studio and production space as well as shops, offices, a 330-bed hotel and 1,400 homes (Manchester Waters).

In 2021, Landsec acquired a 3/4 stake in MediaCityUK, buying out a 1/2 share Legal & General purchased in 2015, reducing Peel's share to 1/4. Landsec purchased the remaining share of the site in November 2024.

=== Pinewood Studios ===
In 2011, Peel acquired a controlling 71% interest in Pinewood Shepperton Plc for £96 million. In 2016, it cut its stake in the film studio operator from 58% to 39%, and then sold the remainder to Leon Bressler's PW Real Estate Fund.

=== Energy ===
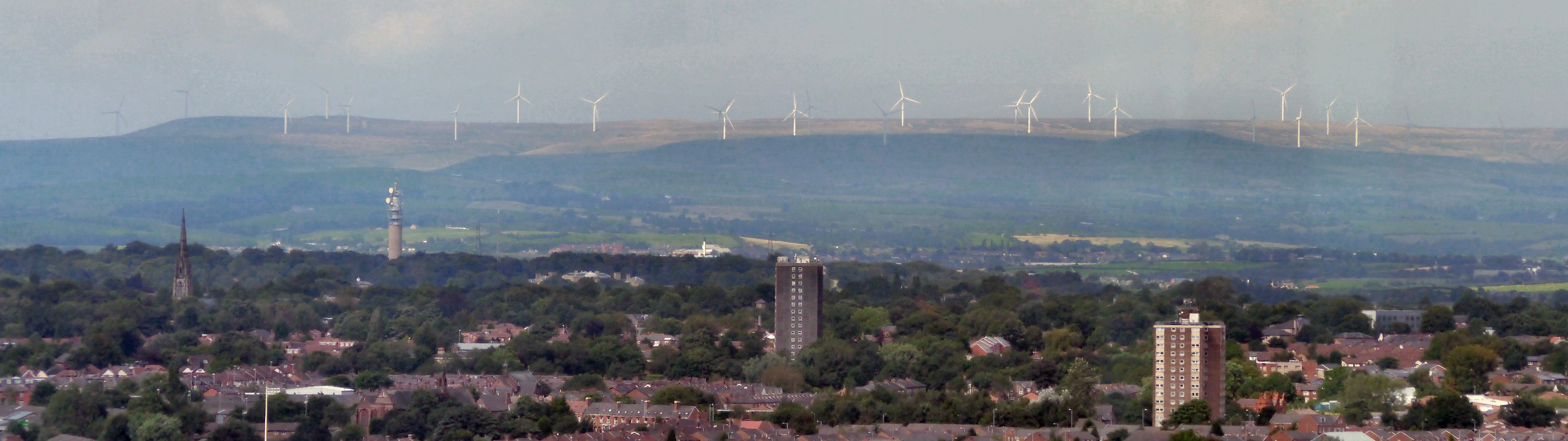
Scout Moor Wind Farm viewed from Manchester, 2012

Peel opened a 65 MW Scout Moor Wind Farm between Edenfield and Rochdale in 2008. Their remaining interest in Scout Moor was sold to MEAG in October 2012.

10 MW Huskisson Dock Wind Farm in 2009 and took over management of the 3.6 MW Port of Seaforth Wind Farm.

50.35 MW Frodsham Wind Farm and 8.2 MW Port of Sheerness Wind Farm both of which became operational in late 2016.

Peel obtained planning consent for a 20 MW biomass combined heat and power power station at Barton, Greater Manchester.

In 2015 Peel announced £700 million Protos scheme on a 134 acres (54 ha) site near Ellesmere Port. Phase One included a 21.5 MW biomass facility and 19-turbine wind farm and was opened in January 2017 by Andrew Percy, Minister for the Northern Powerhouse.

=== Retail and leisure ===
1984	Planning permission granted for Blackburn Peel Centre retail park on the site of Whitebirk power station.
1988	The Peel Centre, Stockport first developed on the site of the former Stockport power station.
1988	Boundary Post Ltd acquired.
1989	Purchase of London Shop Ltd.
1998	The Trafford Centre opens comprising three-miles of shops and then Europe's biggest Food Court
1999	Trafford Retail Park opened. Sold to UK Commercial Property REIT Ltd for £33 million in 2021.
2009	Gloucester Quays opened.
2012	Acquisition of Lowry Centre at Salford Quays.
2020	Planning permission for Therme Manchester spa and water park granted by Trafford Council.

=== Housing ===
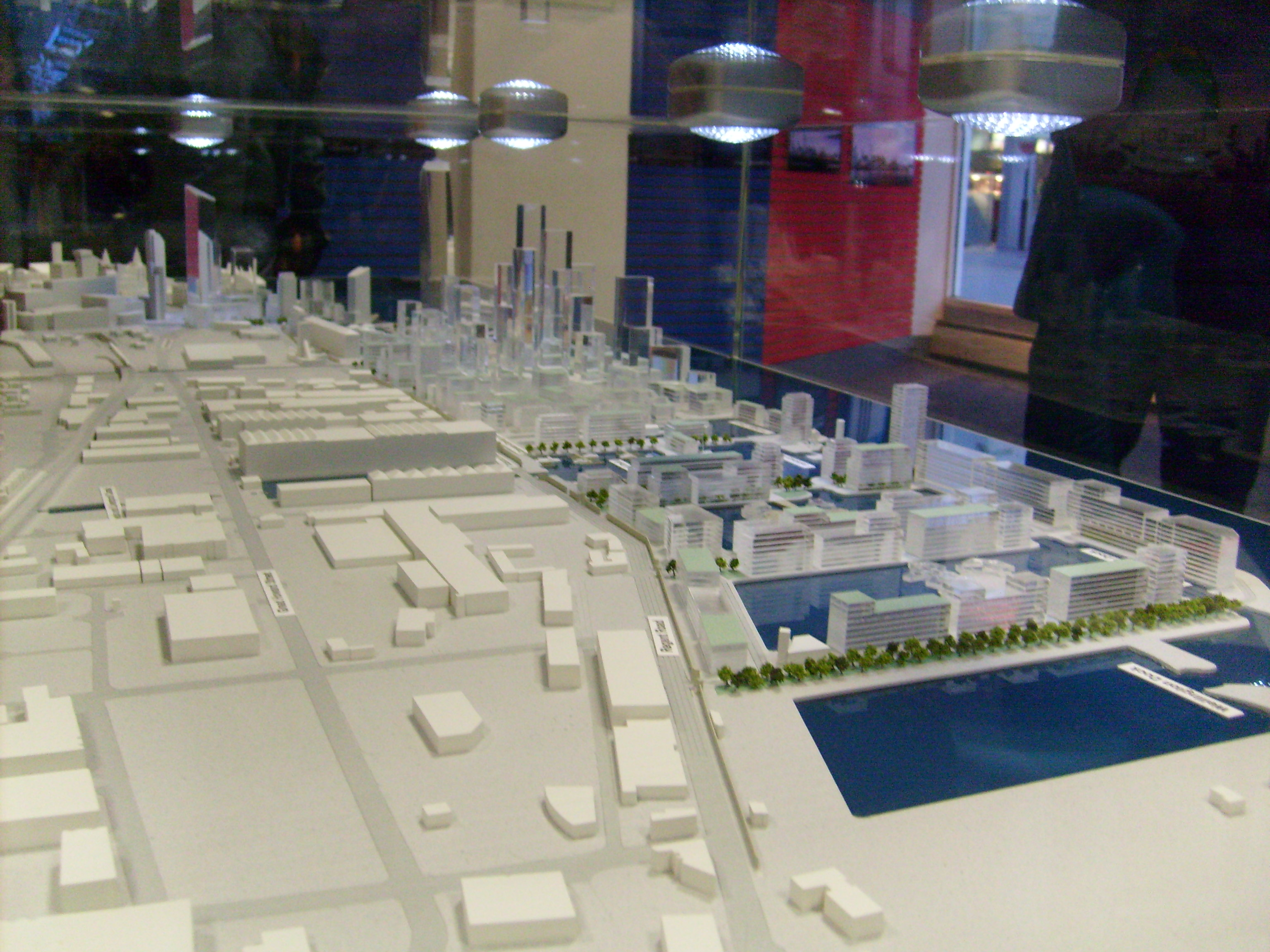
Liverpool Waters model, 2010

In March 2016 Peel Land and Property announced plans to build 30,000 homes across its estate over the next 30 years.

	Homes	
Liverpool Waters	10,000	(Note: Liverpool City Council granted planning permission to the Liverpool Waters scheme as a whole. In July 2021, the World Heritage Committee cited the development as a reason for the revocation of Liverpool's World Heritage status.)
Wirral Waters	13,500	(Note: In October 2016, planning officials approved Peel Land and Property plans for the former Cammel Laird Birkenhead site.)
Glasgow Harbour	1,400	(Note: In 2008, 1,100 apartments were built on the site of the former Meadowside Granary.)
Trafford Waters	3,000	(Note: Planning permission was granted in October 2016 at Trafford Park.)
Chatham Waters	1,000	(Note: Planning permission for the first phase was granted in 2013)
Manchester Waters	2,000	(Note: At Salford Quays)

In 2022, Peel Land and Property promoted closure of Chatham Docks to make way for 3,625 new homes, and commercial uses. It argued the cost of refurbishing the dock gates was not economic.

== Business structure ==
The Peel Group has a complex business structure, consisting of 342 registered and active companies and subsidiaries excluding Peel Ports in the UK. Its ultimate parent company is the Isle of Man-based Tokenhouse Ltd.

== Controversies ==
=== Hunterston Parc ===
Campaigners objected to an LNG terminal Peel proposed for Hunterston Parc, Largs. The scheme included a combined cycle gas turbine power station; deep water port; facilities for oil rig decommissioning; a site for the recycling and storage of plastics, and dredging 2.4 million cubic metres of seabed. No environmental impact assessment was provided for the development.

=== Chat Moss ===
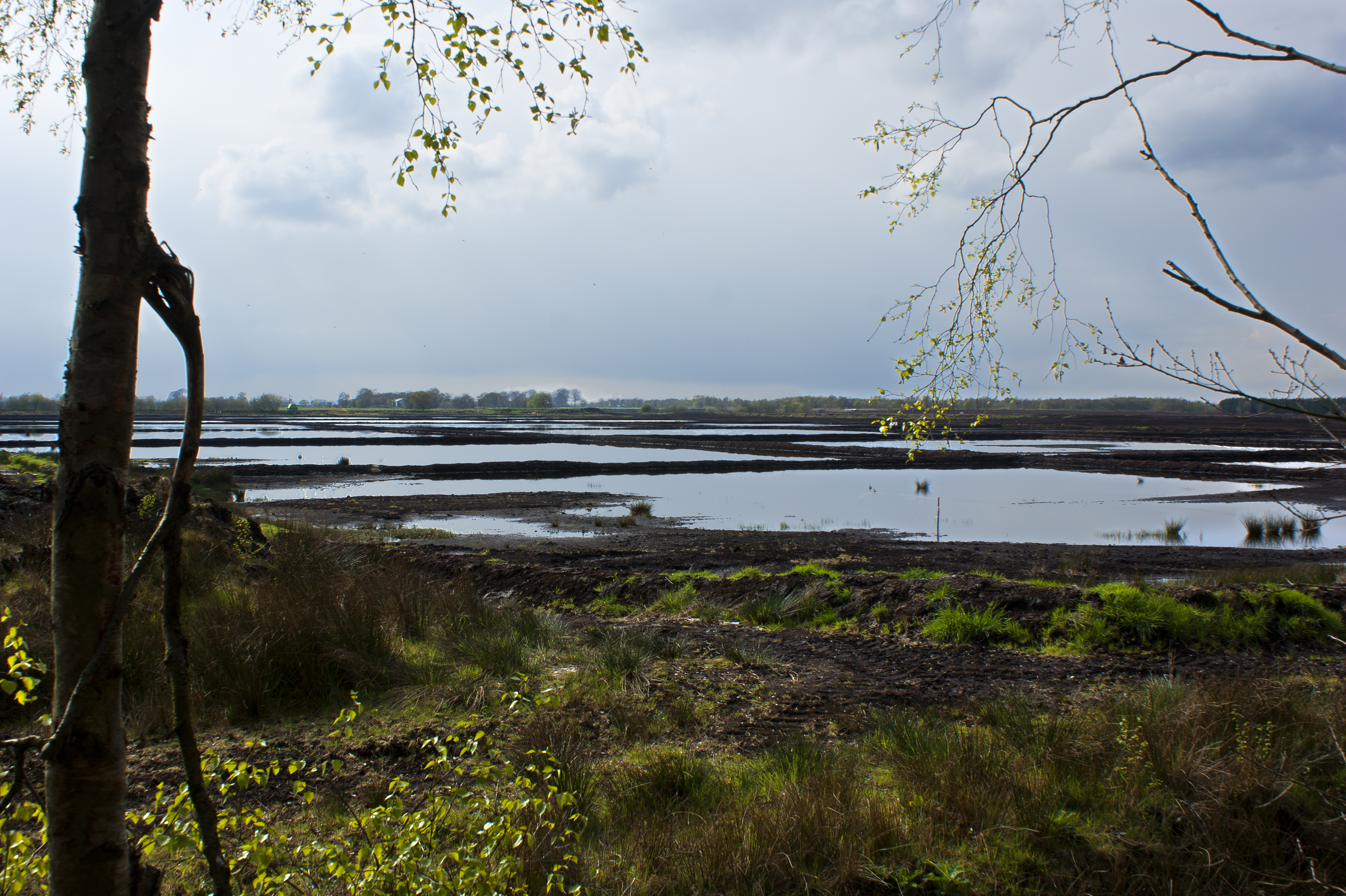
Chat Moss, 2012

In 2011, Peel was accused of illegally extracting peat from its land near Salford. Following a 2012 Public Inquiry, Communities and Local Government Minister, Eric Pickles, backed Salford Council and Wigan Council in refusing further extraction at Chat Moss.

=== Biomass imports ===
In 2015, Peel established a biomass terminal at Liverpool's Gladstone Dock for wood pellet imports from wetland forests in the Southern US. The pellets are then transported to Drax Power Station to be burnt. Campaigners objected to the greenhouse gas created in the process.

=== Car park fines ===
In 2021, multiple complaints were made about parking fines being issued by automated systems at Stockport Peel Centre even after motorists had purchased parking tickets.

=== Hunterston fatality ===
Peel's Clydeport business was fined £5,000 in 2001 following a shore side fatality at Hunterston Terminal. The prior year it paid a £7,500 fine for an earlier incident.

=== Flying Phantom ===
In 2014, Peel's Clydeport business pleaded guilty to health and safety breaches and was fined £650,000 following a triple fatality. River Clyde tug Flying Phantom capsized in the 2007 incident. Judgement found there had been systematic failure in risk assessments and safe systems of work. The charges also related to a similar incident involving the tug in 2000.

=== Fracking collusion ===
In 2014, high level collusion was found between Peel, police and a council. Documents revealed Salford Council, IGas Energy, Greater Manchester Police and Peel were sharing intelligence during anti-fracking protests at Barton Moss.

=== Congestion charge ===
In 2008, Peel was alleged to have covertly controlled a group that campaigned against a congestion charge for Manchester. It was claimed Peel feared a congestion charge would harm business at their Trafford Centre. Voters rejected introducing a congestion charge.

=== Excessive influence ===
In 2013, a report by Liverpool think-tank ExUrbe criticised Peel's excessive influence on affairs and development in the Liverpool region, claiming Peel "blurred the boundaries between public and private interests".

=== Tax evasion ===
In June 2013, Margaret Hodge, Chair of the Public Accounts Committee, accused Peel of tax dodging, and explained some parts of the group pay on average 10% Corporation Tax, and the more profitable ones paid no tax at all.

=== HMS Plymouth ===
In 2006 Peel required the Warship Preservation Trust to leave their Birkenhead premises. The trust was unable to find an alternative location for its vessels and shut down. HMS Plymouth remained berthed and Peel took possession. In 2014, campaigners disputed the legality of those ownership rights. The group accused the port of allowing the ship's condition to worsen in order to make any attempt to move/preserve her appear unfeasible.

The campaigners were also critical of the way the subsequent sale of the vessel to Turkey for scrap was conducted.

=== Marine Terminals industrial action ===
In 2009, following redundancies (layoffs) at Peel's Marine Terminals Ltd subsidiary in Dublin, and eight weeks of industrial action, strikers seized the cargo handling company's control room. In co-ordinated action, Dutch FNV Union occupied the headquarters of sister subsidiary BG Freight's head office in Rotterdam. Peel had hired private security firm Control Risks to police their Dublin facility.

=== MV Francop ===
During unloading of the MV Francop at Peel's Dublin container port a sailor was crushed to death. During the 2018 incident a stack of four cargo containers was lifted off the vessel with a crane, resulting in the bottom container parting from the stack and falling onto the sailor. It was alleged against Peel's subsidiary Marine Terminals Ltd that there was no appropriate planning, instruction, communication and supervision of the method to insert a missing deck lock under the bottom container in the stack.

=== Warrington traffic ===
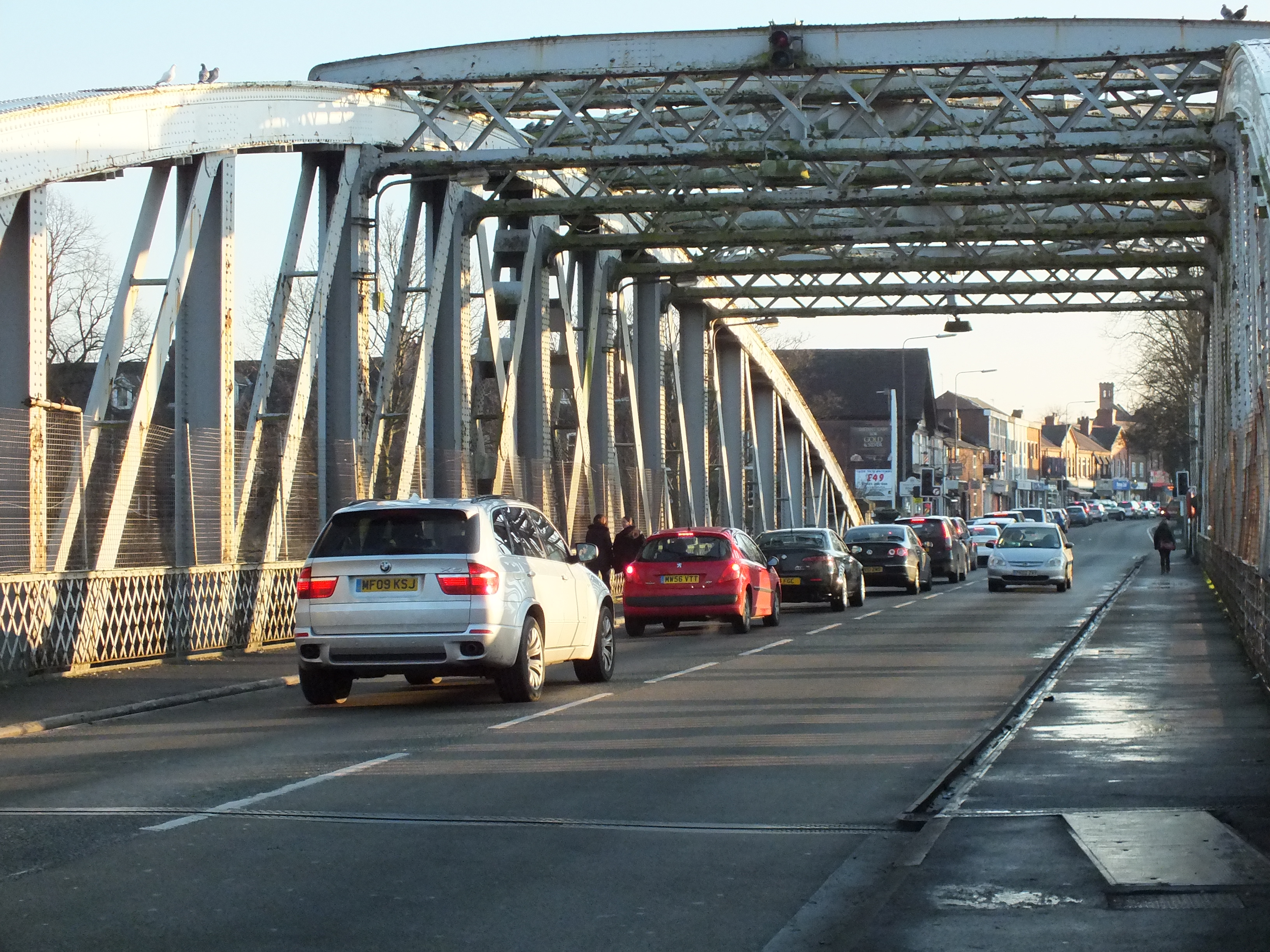
London Road Swing Bridge, Warrington - 2013

In 2014, Warrington Council accused Peel's Manchester Ship Canal of "self interest" and prioritising canal users rather than vehicle traffic in its operation of swing bridges over the canal. The council and canal operator subsequently announced they would work together. Residents were particularly concerned about the situation when the M6 Thelwall Viaduct had to be closed for maintenance, leaving no alternative route locally across the canal.

=== Land hoarding ===
In his 2019 book Who Owns England, Guy Shrubsole describes Peel as one of the 'secretive' companies that "hoards England's land" and has made significant impacts, good and bad, on the environment and people's lives:

Peel Holdings operates behind the scenes, quietly acquiring land and real estate, cutting billion-pound deals and influencing numerous planning decisions. Its investment decisions have had an enormous impact, whether for good or ill, on the places where millions of people live and work.

=== World Heritage loss ===
In July 2021, the World Heritage Committee cited the development of Liverpool Waters as a reason for the revocation of Liverpool's World Heritage status.

=== Ardrossan Harbour ===
Peel Ports have been involved in the Scottish ferry fiasco relating to Caledonian MacBrayne (CalMac) ferry services from the mainland port of Ardrossan in North Ayrshire to Brodick, Isle of Arran. New ferries MV Glen Sannox and MV Glen Rosa were commissioned for the route, but cannot fit existing infrastructure at Ardrossan. There has been ongoing criticism of Peel Ports' reluctance to commit to infrastructure investment at Ardrossan Harbour, including from then-First Minister Humza Yousaf. Peel Ports have insisted that their "willingness to invest in the harbour remains steadfast".

The situation has been made worse since the closure by Peel Ports of the harbour's other berth in February 2024 due to safety concerns, meaning that relief vessel MV Alfred cannot operate from Ardrossan. Peel Ports were criticised by then-CalMac CEO Robbie Drummond for allowing the berth "to remain in a state of disrepair". Since the arrival of Glen Sannox and the ongoing presence of Alfred on the route, ferry services have operated to Troon in South Ayrshire, causing longer journey times and reduced sailing frequency.

In early 2025, the Scottish Government announced that they were considering buying Ardrossan Harbour due to the lengthy delay in agreeing the upgrade project between themselves, Peel Port, and North Ayrshire Council.

In May 2025, there was criticism from campaigners due to slow progress in the potential harbour buyout process, with the situation being described as a "stalemate". Peel Ports accused the Scottish Government ferry agency, Caledonian Maritime Assets (CMAL), of not engaging with them with sufficient "pace and energy".
