= Port Salford =

Coordinates: 53.4636°N 2.3888°W

- A render of the Port Salford freight terminal
- Interactive map of Port Salford

Location
- Country: England
- Location: Barton-upon-Irwell, Greater Manchester, England

Details
- Opened: 2016
- Owned by: Peel Ports

Statistics
- Website https://www.oceangateway.co.uk/projects/port-salford/

Port Salford is a freight terminal on the banks of the Manchester Ship Canal in Barton-upon-Irwell, Greater Manchester, England, 6 miles (9.7 km) west of Manchester city centre. The port is part of the Atlantic Gateway project and its construction was led by Peel Ports, a subsidiary of the Peel Group, and was opened in 2016.

Port Salford cost £400 million to construct.

== Background ==
Port Salford is based on the banks of the Manchester Ship Canal, the only ship canal in the United Kingdom and the eighth longest in the world. The canal connects Manchester, a national city of cultural and economic significance, to the Irish Sea. The ship canal was completed in 1894 and designed to give Manchester and Salford unhindered access to the sea. At its peak in the 1960s, Manchester docks were the third busiest in the United Kingdom.

== Development ==
The port is close to key sites for the distribution of goods, such as Manchester and Trafford Park. Construction tenders were handed out in March 2011, and building work began in 2013.

=== Salford Western Gateway ===
A new link road has been constructed in connection with the port. The existing A57 road was redirected closer to Salford City Stadium, and a 1-mile new dual carriageway link to Trafford Way and a new lift bridge over the Manchester Ship Canal was constructed to the east of the M60 bridge.

On Monday 16 May 2016, the new bridge collapsed. No one was injured, but the damaged bridge deck fell blocking the span and leaving a cargo vessel, Arklow Vale, stuck at Eccles unable to pass back down the canal.

WGIS involves significant highway works around the M60 motorway, both in Salford and in Trafford, as well as a new rail link from the Liverpool-Manchester railway line (Chat Moss corridor) into the Port Salford intermodal freight interchange.

The contract for WGIS was awarded to Hochtief and the Buckingham Group in December 2012 and construction began in January 2013 for completion in 2016.

== Tenants ==
Tenants include Culina Group.
