= Hunterston Terminal =

Port in North Ayrshire, Scotland

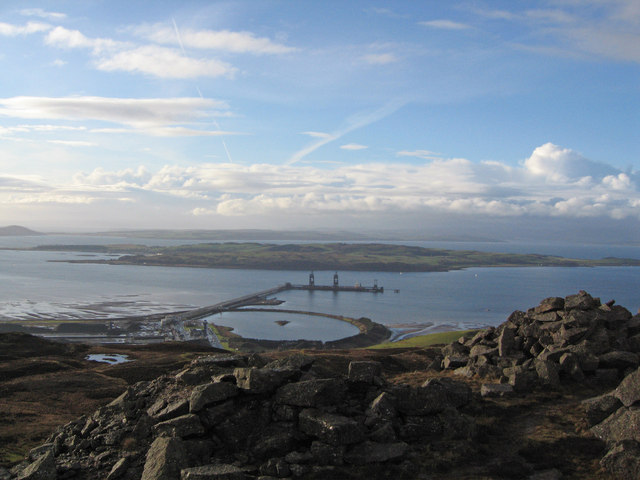
- View from Kaim Hill over the terminal, loop railway line and jetty, towards Great Cumbrae
- Click on the map for a fullscreen view

Location
- Country: United Kingdom
- Location: Fairlie, North Ayrshire, Scotland
- Coordinates: 55°44′17″N 4°51′59″W

Details
- Opened: 1979
- Operated by: The Peel Group

Hunterston Terminal, in North Ayrshire, Scotland, was an iron ore and coal-handling port located at Fairlie on the Firth of Clyde, operated by Clydeport which was taken over by The Peel Group in 2003. It lies south of Fairlie, adjacent to Hunterston estate, site of Hunterston Castle, and its jetty projects out approximately 1 mile (1.6 km), about midway into the channel between the mainland and the island of Great Cumbrae.

The port, completed in 1979, was originally called Hunterston Ore Terminal and was built to handle iron ore for British Steel Corporation's Ravenscraig steelworks. Existing facilities at General Terminus Quay on the upper River Clyde were unsuitable for increasingly large vessels. Hunterston, with its one-mile-long (1.6 km) jetty, was able to handle modern ships of any size, but was closed in 2016 and the site cleared in 2019.

== History ==
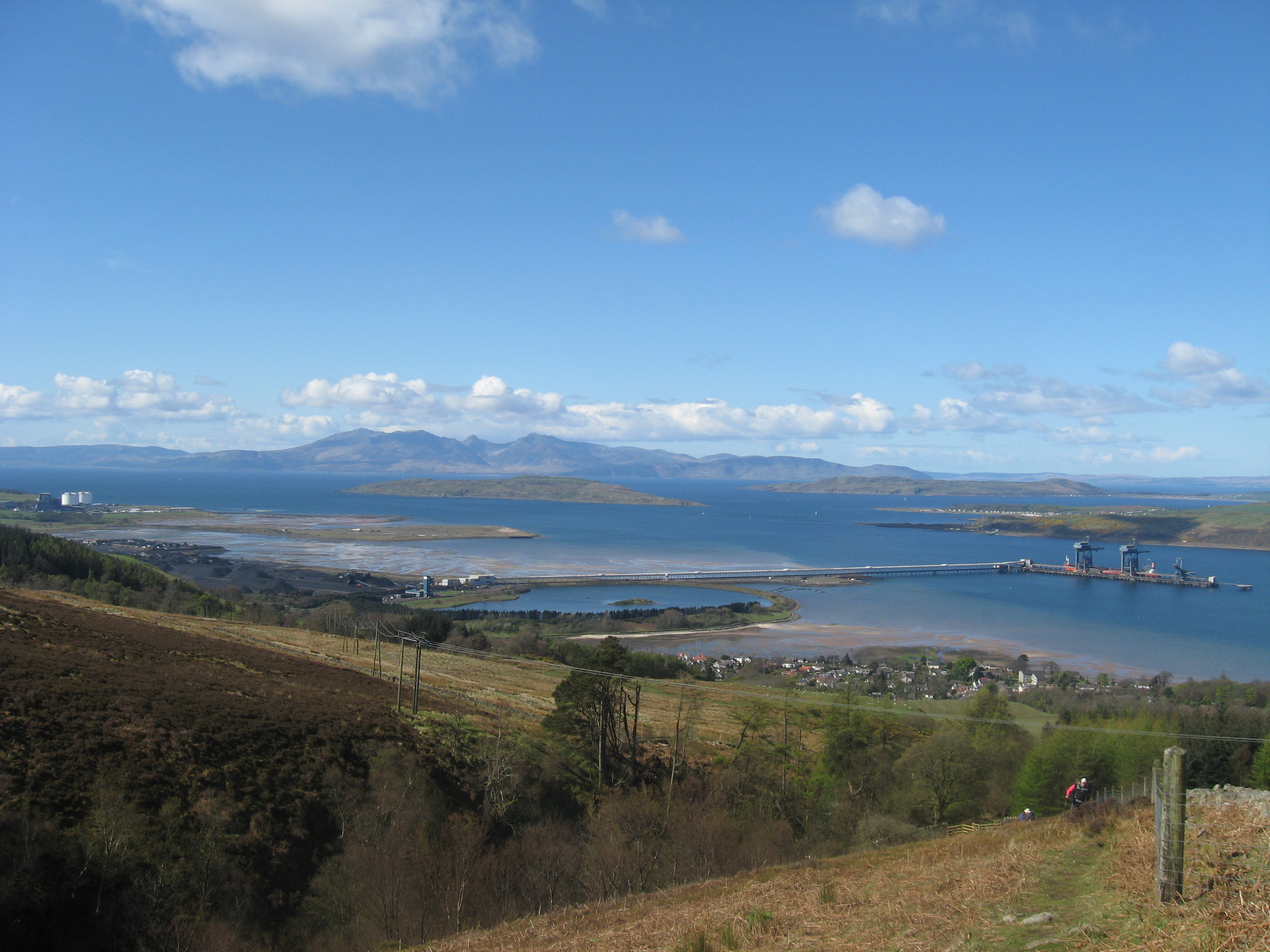
View from Kaim Hill over the terminal and construction yard, across the Firth of Clyde to the Cumbraes and Arran

The new port at Hunterston replaced facilities at General Terminus Quay (now Springfield Quay), on the River Clyde, near the centre of Glasgow. These facilities had been designed in the early 1950s to allow the simultaneous unloading of two large ships carrying bulk iron ore. The ships were designed to carry 12,000 tons (12,200 tonnes) of iron ore. Iron ore was to be transported, in railway waggons, via the General Terminus and Glasgow Harbour Railway, from the General Terminus Quay to the new Ravenscraig steelworks which opened in the late 1950s.

== Facilities at Hunterston Terminal ==
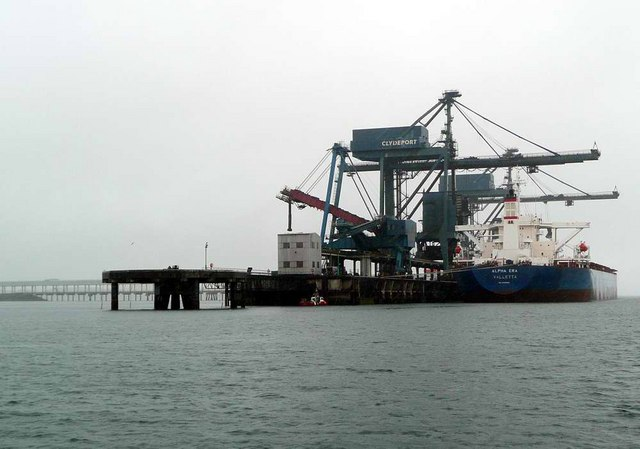
At the end of the jetty, the bulk carrier Alpha Era has unloaded coal.

At Hunterston Terminal, an overhead conveyor linked to two gantry cranes carried ore or coal to a railhead on the Ayrshire Coast Line railway. Clydeport claimed an unloading rate of 2800 tonnes of coal per hour. The conveyor was also linked to a ship loader to load coal into smaller ships on the inner berth; this coal was transported to Manchester and Belfast amongst other places.

Among other users, coal from Hunterston Terminal supplied Drax power station in Yorkshire and was used at Longannet power station in Fife until its closure in 2016. The need to link to Longannet was a major reason for the reopening of the Stirling-Alloa-Kincardine rail link, although this only served the plant for its last eight years.

The terminal was closed in 2016, and lay dormant. In 2012 a National Offshore Wind Turbine Test facility was installed at the Hunterston Construction Yard, and two wind turbines tested for use on offshore wind farms. One was dismantled in 2018, the second was demolished in 2019.

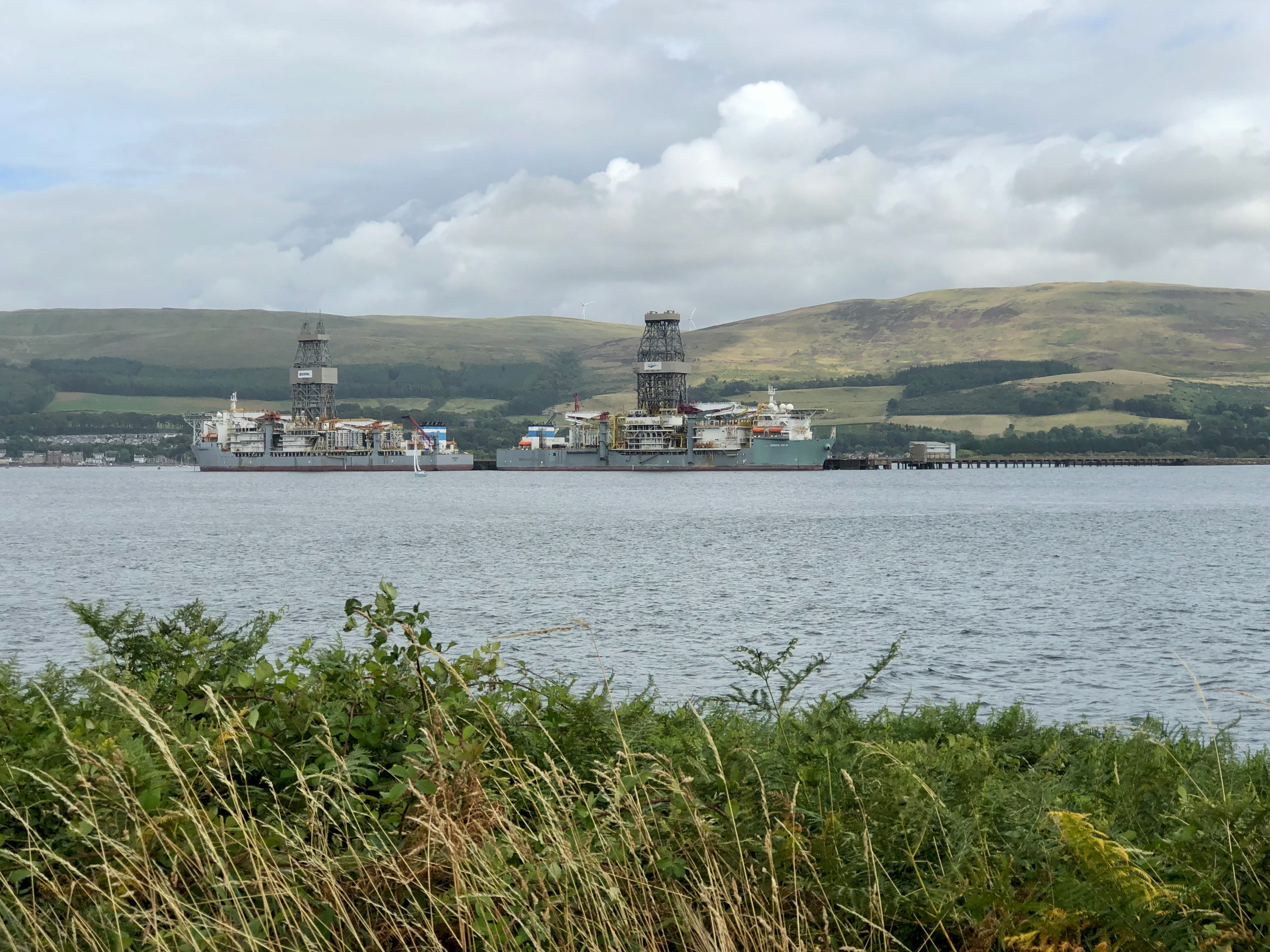
Laid up drillships at Hunterston jetty, from Great Cumbrae

In 2018 North Ayrshire Council granted planning permission to use the site for decommissioning oil rigs. In May 2019 The Peel Group (which had taken over the asset from Clydeport in 2003) launched a public consultation on proposed uses for the former terminal. The site was cleared by a year long demolition contract commencing in March 2019, both unloaders were removed around August 2019. From December 2019, two drillships, owned and operated by Valaris Limited, were moored at the jetty.

== Hunterston PARC ==
The former iron ore and coal yard, which occupied 320 acres (130 ha) of land alongside the terminal was cleared by Clydeport at a cost of £10m, to create the Hunterstone Port and Resource Centre (PARC). The aim is to create an 'energy and marine campus... to deliver technological advances in areas such as power generation and aquaculture'. In August 2021 it was announced that one of the users of the site would be XLCC, a new company planning to make high voltage undersea cables. HVDC cables are needed both by offshore wind farms and for long-distance interconnects, to shift surplus electricity around the UK and to and from neighbouring countries. The process requires huge quantities of aluminium, lead, steel and bitumen, and the resulting cable weighs 70 kilograms (150 lb) per metre. It needs to be made in lengths of up to 140 kilometres (87 miles) so direct access to a vast purpose-built cable-laying ship is vital, making the adjacent terminal a key feature of the new plant. The intended production capacity for the plant is 2,400 kilometres (1,500 miles) of HVDC cable a year, which is almost as much as the 2020 total European production of such cables. This will require around £1bn of investment on the manufacturing plant and the ship.

== See also ==
- List of ports and harbours in Scotland
