= Trafford Centre =

Shopping centre and entertainment complex in Trafford, Greater Manchester

Coordinates: 53.4684°N 2.3489°W

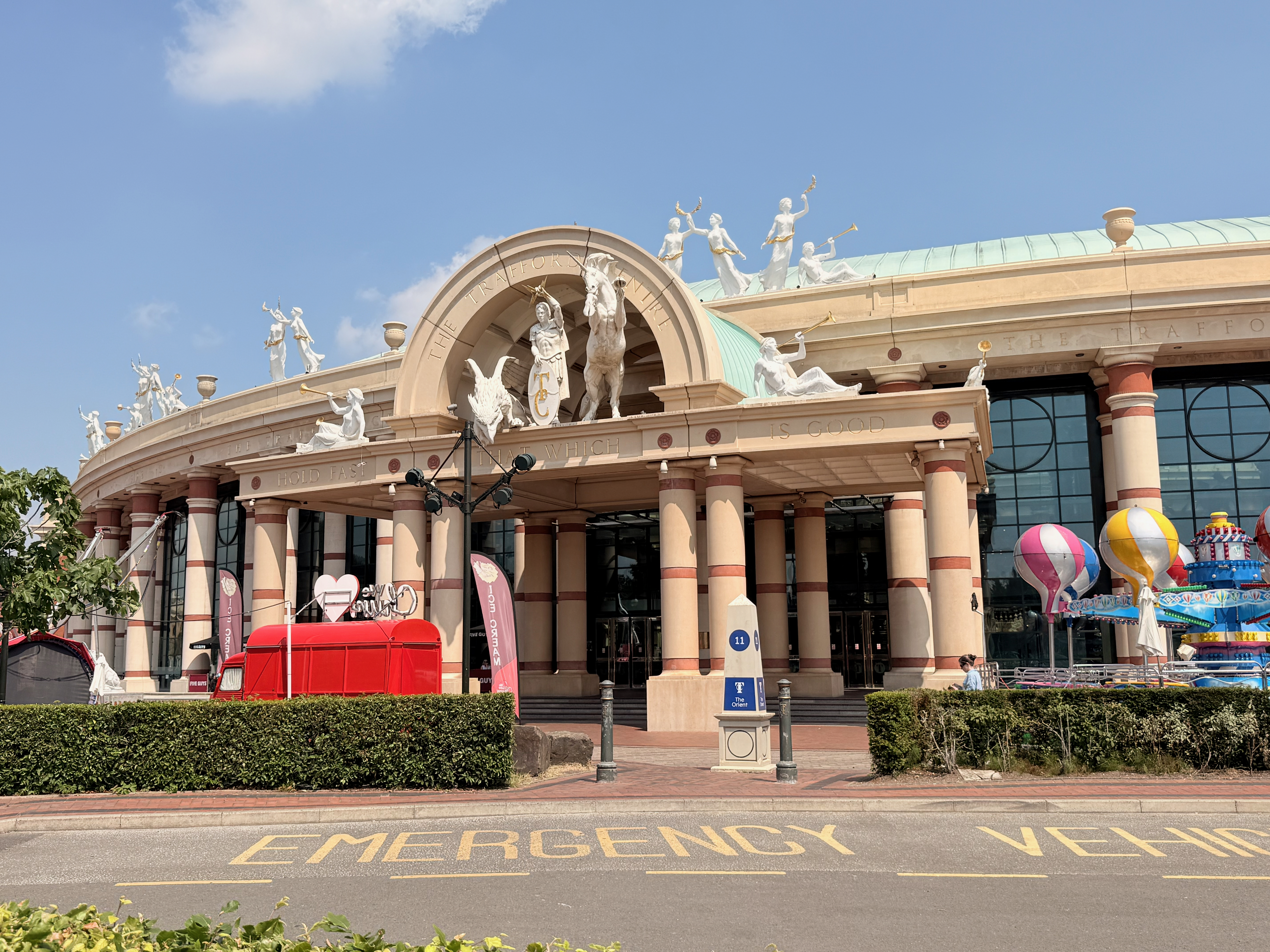
- Trafford Centre main entrance
- Location: Dumplington, Trafford, Greater Manchester, England
- Opened: 10 September 1998; 28 years ago
- Developer: The Peel Group
- Manager: Savills
- Owner: CPP Investments
- Architect: Chapman Taylor; Leach Rhodes Walker
- Num. of stores: 200
- Num. of anchor tenants: 4: Boots (1998–present); Selfridges (1998–present); Marks & Spencer (2001–present); John Lewis (2005–present)
- Floor area: Retail: 130,754 m^{2} (1,407,420 sq ft); Leisure: 11,860 m^{2} (127,700 sq ft); Dining: 15,142 m^{2} (162,990 sq ft); Total: 157,756 m^{2} (1,698,070 sq ft)
- Floors: 3
- Parking: 11,500
- Public transit: Manchester Metrolink - The Trafford Centre
- Website: traffordcentre.co.uk

The Trafford Centre is a large indoor shopping centre and entertainment complex in Trafford Park, Greater Manchester, England. It opened in 1998 and attracted 23.5 million visitors in 2025.

Originally developed by the Peel Group, the Trafford Centre was sold to Capital Shopping Centres, later to become Intu, in 2011 for £1.65 billion; it set a record as the costliest single property sale in British history.

The battle to obtain permission to build the centre was amongst the longest and most expensive in United Kingdom planning history. As of 2011, the Trafford Centre had Europe's largest food court and the UK's busiest cinema.

== History ==
=== Genesis ===
In 1922, the Manchester Ship Canal Company purchased 2,000 acres (810 ha) of the former de Trafford family estate intending to develop it for industrial uses, mirroring the success of the existing Trafford Park estate. By the time that Trafford Park's industry began to decline in the 1960s, a 300-acre (120 ha) parcel of land had remained undeveloped.

The Peel Group had begun developing retail parks around the North West of England in the early 1980s and had initially earmarked the future Trafford Centre site as a potential location for a new retail park. Its chairman, John Whittaker was made aware of the site in 1984, and realised that it would be suitable for a large indoor shopping mall similar to the MetroCentre in Gateshead.

I had a look at it and said this isn’t a retail park, this is a Metro. This is really the right location for a Metro.

— John Whittaker, Chairman of The Peel Group

After learning that the site was owned by the Manchester Ship Canal Company, which Whittaker had been acquiring shares in since 1971, Whittaker approached the company with an offer to purchase the land but was told that as the land was earmarked for Manchester's bid for the 1996 summer Olympics it was not for sale. The chairman of the Manchester Ship Canal company also revealed that they also had their own plans to build a shopping centre on the site if the Olympic bid was unsuccessful.

Having his offer to purchase the site rebuffed forced Whittaker to pursue an alternative strategy to obtain the land, he began slowly taking control of the Manchester Ship Canal Company by strategically acquiring controlling shares.

Manchester City Council encountered a conflict of interest as both a local planning authority and a minority shareholder of the Ship Canal Company, however Its shareholding no longer afforded it any real control. Manchester City Council voiced their opposition to Whittaker's retail proposal citing potential negative impacts on the Manchester city centre economy. They however acknowledged that the development was in the interests of the shareholders.

Consequently, in 1986, the council surrendered its rights to appoint all but one of the Manchester Ship Canal Company's directors and sold its shares to Whittaker for £10 million.

By 1986, Whitaker had majority control of the Manchester Ship Canal Company and that year a planning application for a shopping centre and various sports facilities on the 300-acre site was submitted to Trafford Council. The site was the last undeveloped part of Trafford Park and would remain in agricultural use until 1990. The proposal was subsequently called in by the Secretary of State for the Environment (which is automatic for a scheme of such size) resulting in legal disputes and two public inquiries before planning permission was granted. Concerns raised included potential congestion on the M60 motorway and adverse consequences for high streets in other Greater Manchester towns.

The Trafford Centre was one of three proposals for a large out-of-town shopping centre in Greater Manchester at the time. A proposal known as Regatta at Salteye was to be located close to Barton Aerodrome in Salford, just across the Manchester Ship Canal from the Trafford Centre. The second rival centre was to be located on a site at Carrington, Trafford.

The Planning Applications for both rival schemes were automatically called in by the Secretary of State and the government made it clear that only one proposal could be permitted. A public inquiry was set up in 1987 to examine which of the proposals should be allowed to be considered for Planning Permission. In 1990 the government announced that the Trafford Centre was considered the best proposal of the three citing the regenerative effects it would have on Trafford Park. This decision formally killed off the Regatta and Carrington shopping centre proposals.

The Trafford Centre would be granted planning permission in 1993 after a second public inquiry, but this was reversed in 1994 by the Court of Appeal. Objections were raised by a consortium of local authorities who feared the proposed Trafford Centre would harm their traditional town centres. The Peel Group appealed the decision which lead to the case being considered by the House of Lords, the highest court in the land at the time.

On 24 May 1995, the House of Lords overturned the 1994 Court of Appeal judgement therefore re-instating the 1993 grant of planning permission and settling the long running planning process for good.

John Whittaker was not perturbed by the protracted planning challenges and always expected the decision to eventually be made in his favour. The extended timescale allowed Whittaker and the centre's architect, Rodney Carran of Chapman Taylor architects to visit shopping centres around the world for inspiration.

Following the House of Lords' decision to approve the scheme, work began on designing the final version of the centre in May 1995. Bovis Construction was appointed as the lead contractor in October of that year. In February 1996, Selfridges was announced as the first anchor tenant for the mall. Later that month an exhibition showcasing the design of the centre was held at Trafford Town Hall.

Construction commenced on-site in May 1996, with piling works. Assembly of the steel frame began in August. By December 1996 the dome's skeleton was visible on the skyline. By late 1997, the steel frame was complete and significant progress had been made on the facade and interior. During the summer of 1998 construction reached its peak, with 3,000 workers on-site fitting out retail units and completing other parts of the building. After 27 months of construction, Peel had invested £600 million.

An opening party for 2,000 invited guests was held in The Orient days before the centre opened to the public. John Whittaker made a theatrical entrance to the stage arriving on a zip line dressed as a naval captain. The Trafford Centre would open its doors on 10 September 1998, with approximately 140,000 eager shoppers visiting on opening day.

An extension known as The Great Hall opened in March 2007, expanding the centre's dining options. A new wing, Trafford Palazzo (originally known as Barton Square) opened in March 2008. Initially focused on homeware and furniture, this extension was redeveloped with works completing in early 2020. Barton Square became a separate entity to the Trafford Centre during the later part of 2020.

=== Intu ===
Peel Group sold the centre to Capital Shopping Centres (CSC) in January 2011 for £1.6 billion, in cash and shares, and John Whittaker, chairman of Peel Group, became deputy chairman of CSC. He later claimed he could have sold the centre for over £2 billion if he had been prepared to accept just cash. Nevertheless, the £1.6 billion deal remained the largest property transaction in British history, and the biggest European property deal of 2011.

Capital Shopping Centres was renamed Intu in 2013 and spent £7 million rebranding the "Intu Trafford Centre".

As of 2017, Intu claimed a fair market value of £2.312 billion for the centre. However, the firm entered administration in June 2020 and the centre was placed into receivership by its creditors in November 2020. In 2020, the Canada Pension Plan Investment Board, who had loaned Intu £250 million in 2017, exercised their rights as creditors to take ownership of the complex excluding Barton Square, which would be legally separated from the centre.

=== Post Intu ===
The now-separated Barton Square was acquired again by Peel Land and Property in May 2021 for an undisclosed sum although the asking price was in excess of £50 million. In November 2021 Peel re-branded the complex to Trafford Palazzo.

Trafford Palazzo and the Trafford Centre now operate as separate shopping centres despite being physically linked.

== Building ==
Inside the Trafford Centre

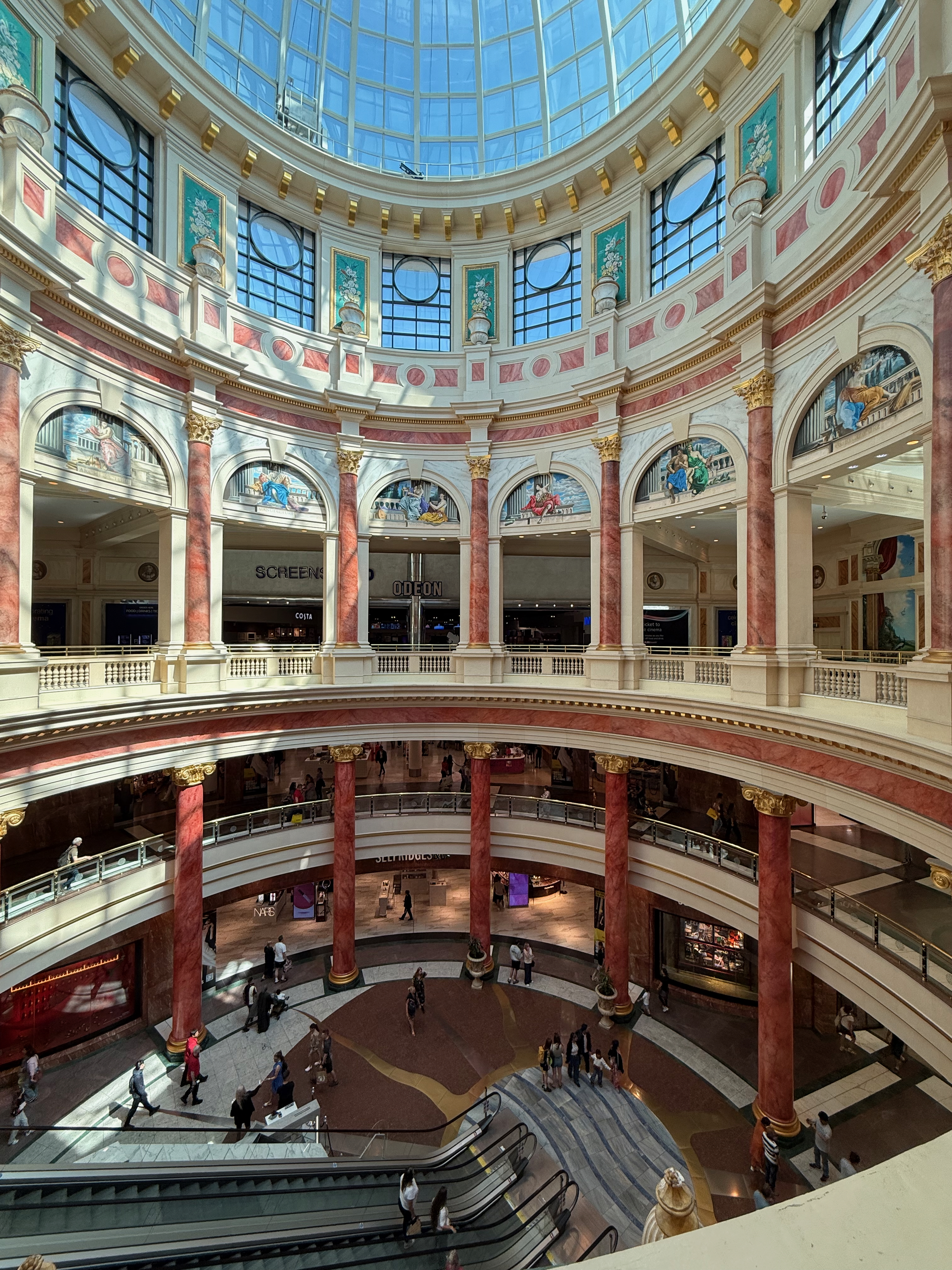
The main dome

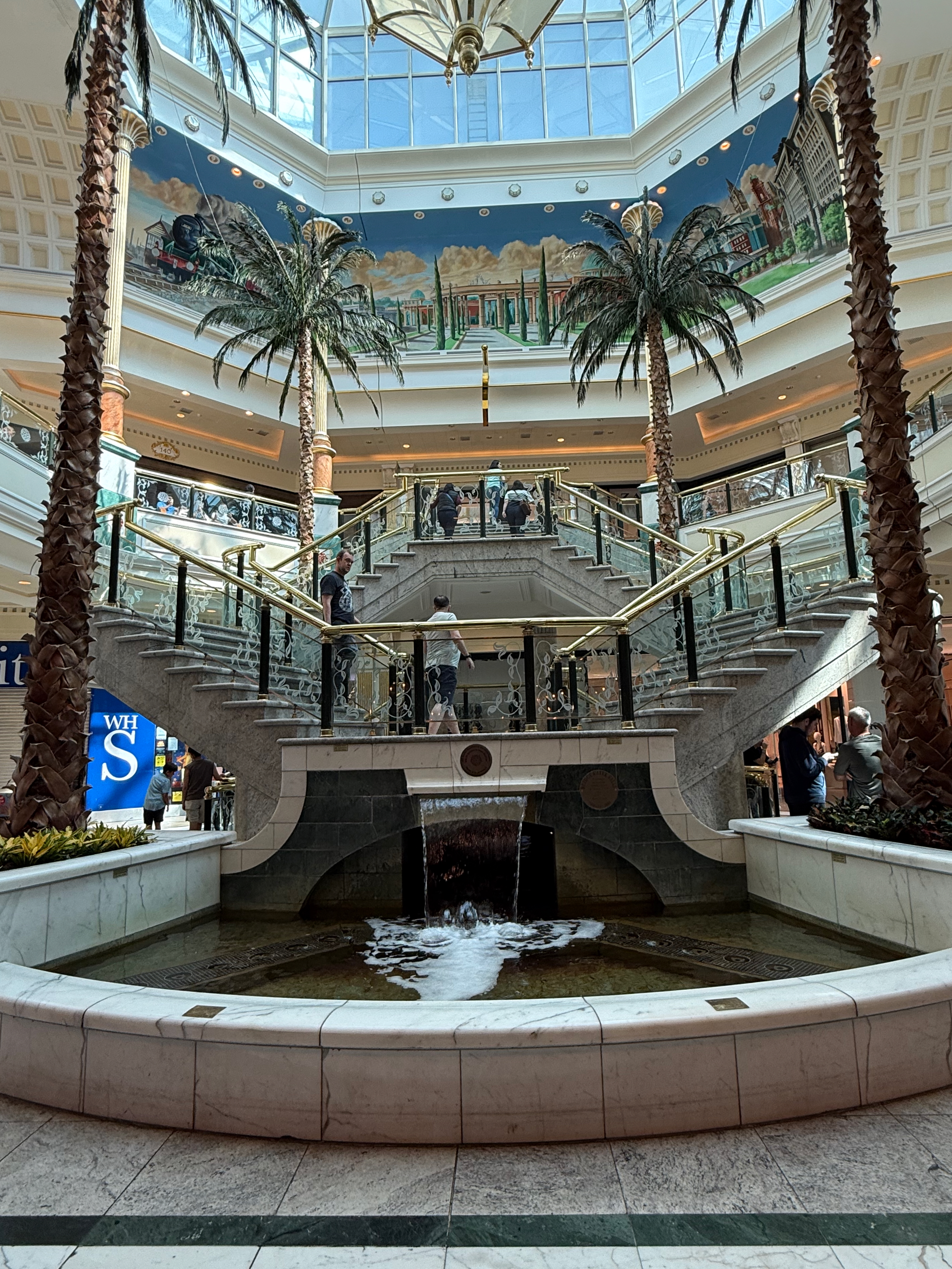
Peel Avenue grand staircase incorporating a fountain

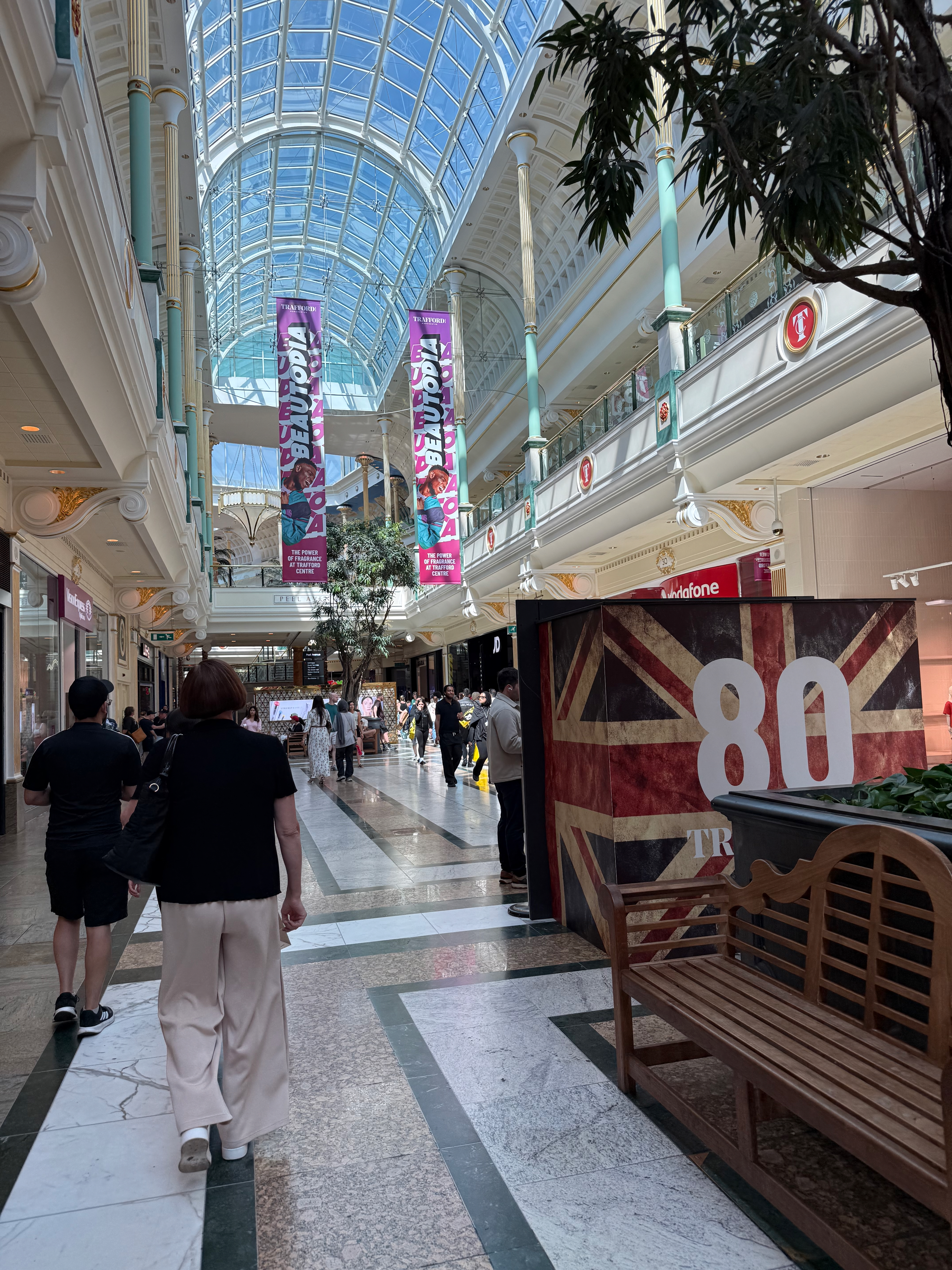
Peel Avenue

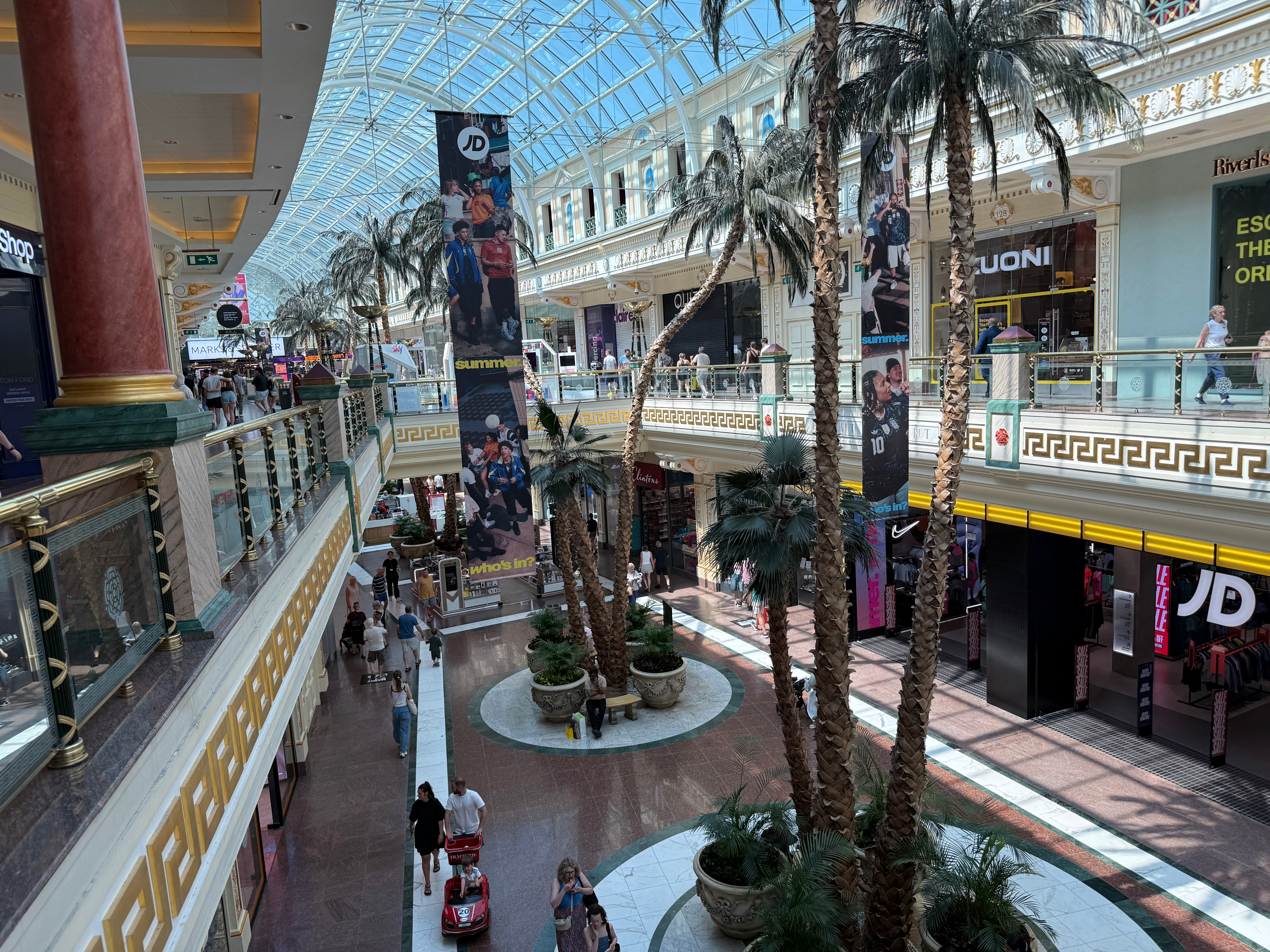
Regent Crescent

The three storey building consists of several distinct areas radiating from the central dome. Regent Crescent and Peel Avenue are the two shopping malls which are both anchored by department stores (Marks and Spencer and John Lewis respectively) at the far ends. Peel Avenue is the east wing of the main building, focusing on mainstream fashion, sportswear, and lifestyle brands, while Regent Crescent is the west wing; hosting a range of more premium retailers. The Dome is home to the first Selfridges outside of London.

The Orient is the leisure and dining area spread over two floors containing the largest food court in Europe and many other restaurants, cafes and leisure facilities. This area was extended in 2007 with the addition of The Great Hall. The 20-screen Odeon Cinema and other leisure facilities are also situated in the Dome area on the second floor accessed via The Orient.

The centre originally contained a market style hall at the end of Peel Avenue known as Festival Village. It consisted of 35,000 sq ft (3,300 m^{2}) of retail space and was home to around 50 smaller stores dedicated to more specialist retailers, along with dining, creche and children's entertainment facilities. This area was closed in late 2003 for conversion into the John Lewis department store, which opened in May 2005.

The Trafford Centre was designed by Chapman Taylor architects of London who were appointed as the conceptual architects at the project's inception. They were selected for their strong track record in designing shopping centres including Meadowhall in Sheffield and Lakeside in Essex.

Manchester based architects Leach Rhodes Walker were responsible for the detailed technical design and managing the construction process. The main contractor was Bovis who brought expertise from constructing Meadowhall, with structural and mechanical & electrical engineering services provided by WSP Group. The landscaping design was by the Derek Lovejoy Partnership.

Due to the scheme's scale and complexity, 24 architects were required to work on the project full time during the construction process producing over 3,000 drawings and specifications.

During the construction phase numerous changes to the design were made as the needs of the retailers and Peel's commercial and aesthetic demands evolved. John Whittaker took an enormous personal interest in the construction of the project and was known to tour the building site at night to inspect the quality and progress of the work.

The building was designed with adaptability in mind meaning that most of the retail units are able to accommodate a mezzanine floor allowing retailers to increase their floorspace within the same unit. An additional floor at second floor level can also be accommodated above the two major department store units if the need arises. The centre was designed to ensure that visitors entered on both of the main floors in equal numbers to ensure that all areas are popular and has a design life of 150 years.

Inspired by English stately homes, Vatican City and The Forum Shops at Caesars in Las Vegas, John Whittaker chose a lavish unorthodox neo-classical inspired style seeking to avoid the centre rapidly appearing dated and stale, a problem many shopping centres were susceptible to. Although the extravagant Rococo and Baroque design may be viewed as gaudy, he argued the prospect of the shopping centre rapidly ageing was mitigated and long-term less renovation work would be required.

When we first started the architects said, "you shouldn’t be doing all this and giving it all the razzmatazz and showbiz, leave that to the retailers. Make it plain, make it clinical, make it white and hospitalised and let them do the work". So then we put in the paintings, we put in the real gold leaf, we put artefacts everywhere, paintings. It is the people’s palace. It is something to attract shoppers ... to give them the Dallas effect.

— John Whittaker – chairman of the Peel Group

Each of the areas within the centre has its own distinct character rich in colour and detail which helps visitors to orient themselves within the building.

The flooring consists of 45,000 m^{2} (480,000 ft^{2}) of granite and marble from Montignoso and Quarrata in Italy. Neoclassical style columns are painted to resemble marble and adorned with gold leaf. The granite floors and brass handrails are polished nightly to maintain the centre's opulence. The Red Rose of Lancaster is used as a decorative motif paying homage to the local area, the county of Lancashire.

Externally the building is post modern in architectural style and is clad primarily in brick and reconstituted stone. Influences of many architectural styles can be seen on the exterior with Neoclassical and Egyptian Revival being especially prominent.

The building is crowned by the 55 m (180 ft) high and 23 m (75 ft) wide main dome, which the developers claim is larger than that of St Paul's Cathedral.

The design of the centre has received some criticism with Manchester architecture critic John Parkinson-Bailey describing the Trafford Centre as a building which "will not appeal to purists" and the range of interior architecture as "bewildering".

The head of Trafford Borough Council's planning department, Dr Gary Pickering was also critical of the classically themed design describing it as "disappointing" and arguing that the decision not to pursue a modern "statement" design represented a missed opportunity.

The centre's disticitive style has inspired other shopping centres around the world, most notably the Global Harbour Mall in Shanghai, China. Both centres were the work of Chapman Taylor architects.

=== Murals ===
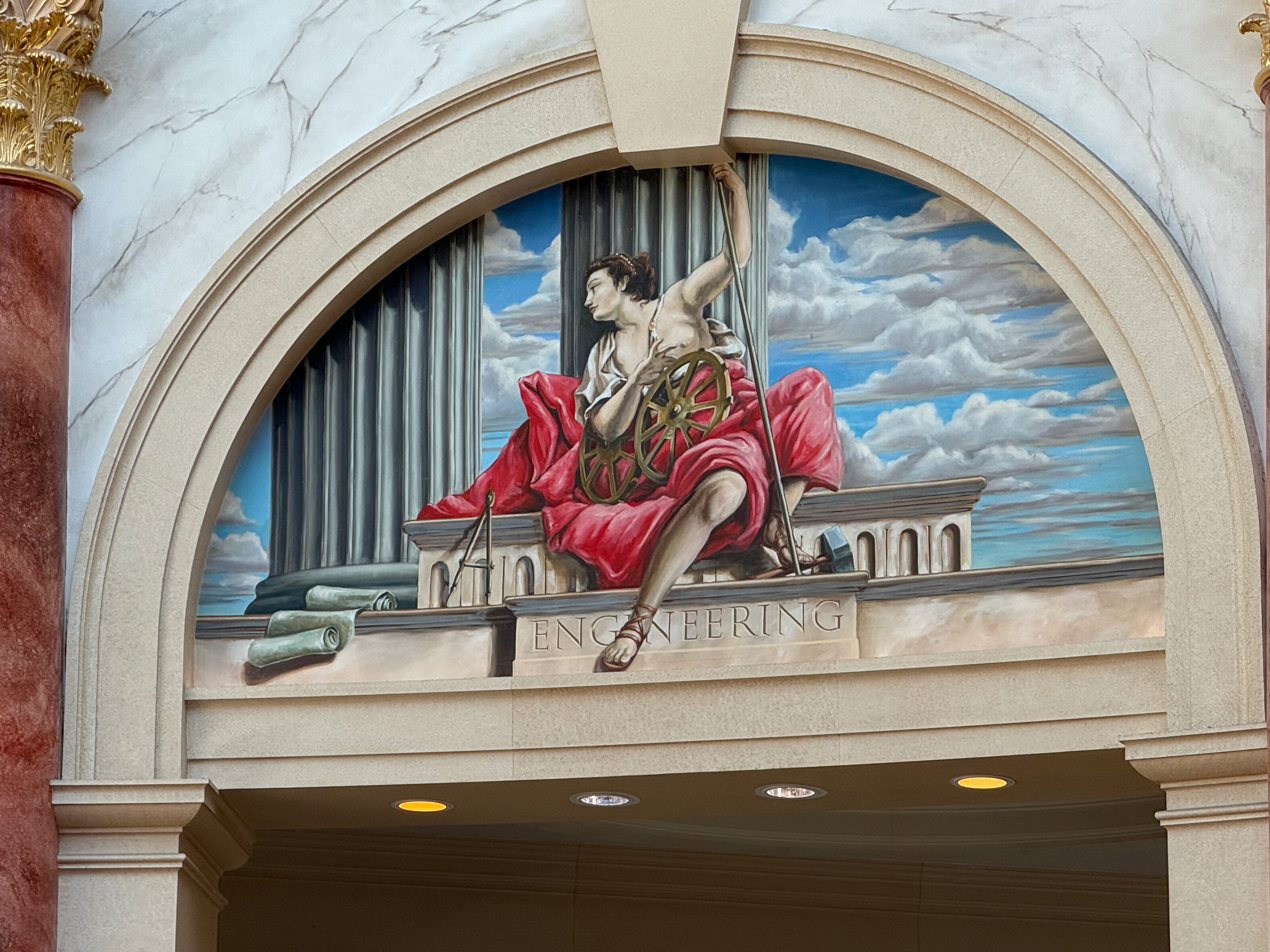
A mural depicting the allegorical figure of engineering

The centre is decorated with hundreds of murals and Trompe-l'œil which adorn its walls and vaulted ceilings. These depict many different themes ranging from classical allegory to historical depictions of The Manchester Ship Canal and other prominent local landmarks.

Portraits displayed in the frieze above Regent Crescent depict 30 of the centres architects, engineers, construction managers and Peel Group staff who played a key role in the centre’s development and construction.

=== Statues and Artefacts ===
A notable feature of the centre is the statuary and other artefacts. There are over 100 figures, mainly in a classical style, many of which were specially commissioned for the centre.

Kent based sculptor Guy Portelli was commissioned to create the 22 classical maidens adorning the colonnade at the front of The Orient. Dancing maidens bear oak branches as reminder of Trafford Park's history as a "beautifully timbered deer park" and reclining figures blow golden trumpets to herald in a new era.

Altrincham sculptor Colin Spofforth created bronze figures of a real life jazz band for the New Orleans theme.

In 1999 a statue of Arthur Brooke, the founder of the Brooke Bond tea company which has had a factory nearby in Trafford Park since 1923, was installed in the centre and can be found in The Orient. The statue was sculpted by Anthony Stones and was donated by the Brooke Bond tea company.

As part of the Great Hall redevelopment in 2007, Spofforth was again commissioned to create a crest which forms part of a new portico at the main entrance. This piece assembles a griffin, unicorn and Roman centurion, once more referencing the arms of the de Trafford family. The centurion holds two lightning bolts, a reminder of Barton Power Station which was situated close by.

A Mercedes 380SL car formerly belonging to John Whittaker's mother was originally displayed on the first floor of Peel Avenue and was moved to Trafford Palazzo after its acquisition by Peel.

A time capsule containing a variety of artefacts including drawings and other work created by pupils from the nearby Barton Clough Primary school was laid in the floor beneath the main dome in July 1998. The pupils also attended the ceremony to lay the capsule.

=== Fountains ===
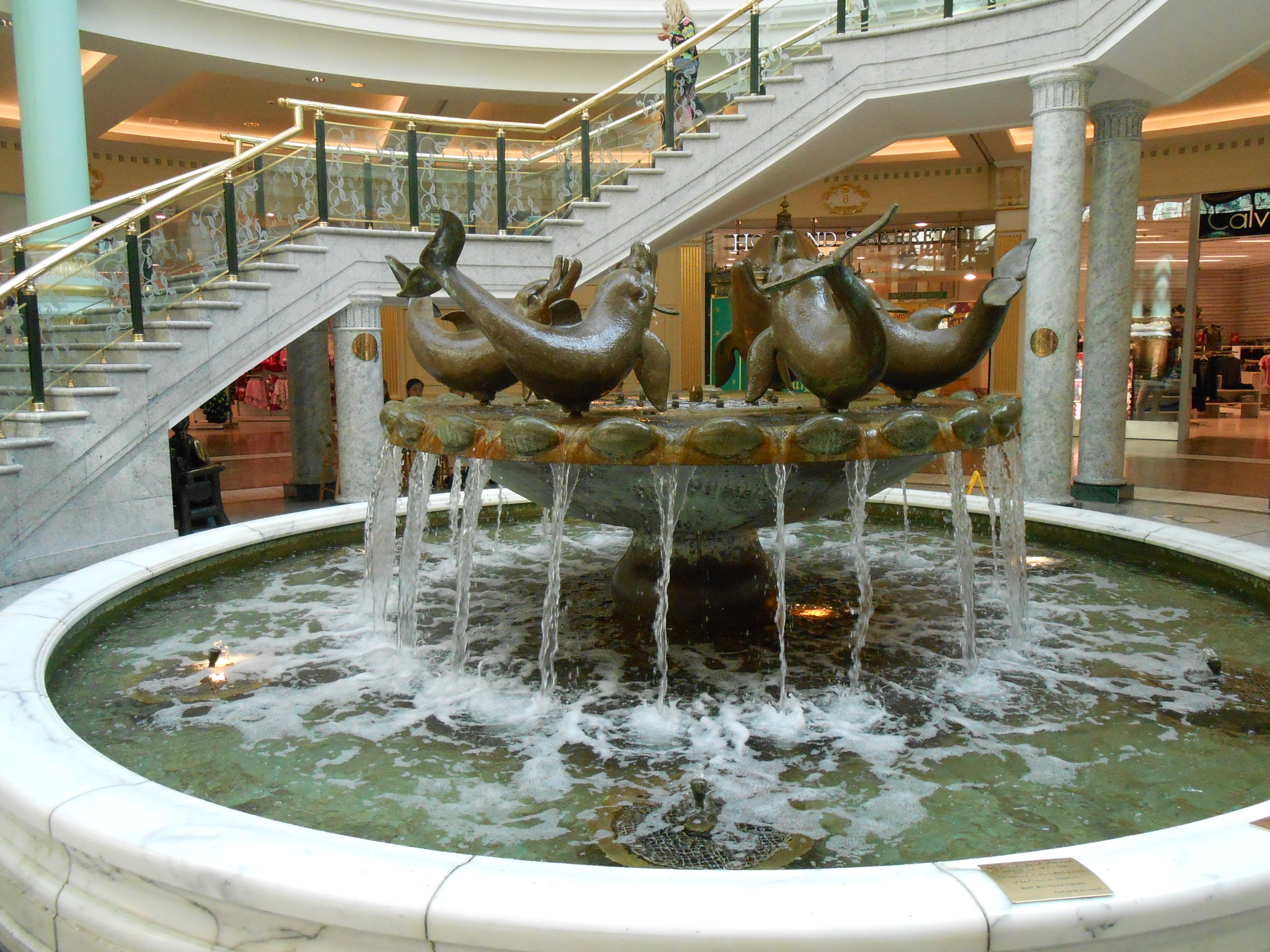
The Dolphin Fountain located on Peel Avenue. Famous for periodically shooting water into the dome above.

Another popular decorative element of the centre are its fountains. Seven fountains originally entertained visitors throughout the centre. Over the years some have been replaced or removed.

The fountains instantly became a popular site for visitors to make a wish by tossing a coin into the water. The Trafford Centre periodically removes the coins from the fountains, cleans them and donates the money to local charities via its own Fountain Fund scheme. As of 2024, over £1.2 million has been donated since 1998.

=== Planting ===
Planting is a major element of the centre's interior design. This takes the form of living and preserved trees as well other smaller shrubs which are grown in large planters. Upon opening the centre was home to 40 living trees and 65 preserved palm trees up to 15 metres high. The living trees, Ficus maclellandii and Adonidia Palms were imported from Florida in the United States and spent some time in a nursery in Rotterdam, The Netherlands to acclimatise to the cooler European climate before being installed in the building. The preserved palms were grown in California, USA.

=== The Orient ===
The Orient is Europe's largest food court with 1,600 seats and 35 restaurant outlets. It is decorated in the style of a 1930s ocean liner, incorporating adjacent themed areas depicting China, the French Quarter of New Orleans, Egypt, Italy, New York and Morocco representing the destinations of an ocean voyage.

The theme was chosen to reference the nearby Manchester Ship Canal and Manchester Docks where passenger and cargo ships once set sail to all parts of the globe. The ceiling of The Orient is painted to resemble a sky with changing lighting effects and fibre optic stars further enhancing the illusion.

The two floors incorporate restaurants, bars and fast food outlets in sight of a giant screen.

The Orient was designed by the Wilmslow based Imagineering Global and was intended to become a destination in itself originally having later opening hours to the rest of the centre at weekends.

In February 2025, the China Town section of The Orient was redeveloped into a new area known as Eastern Garden. This area now houses several independent outlets serving Asian cuisine. As part of the works a new more contemporary design has been introduced inspired by Japanese architecture.

In October 2026, it was announced that The Orient would be getting a refresh for the first time since it opened in 1998, it would now be themed to a more modern ocean liner and would introduce new tables and chairs, the refresh will also introduce new technology, such as charger plugs on desks.

==== Great Hall ====
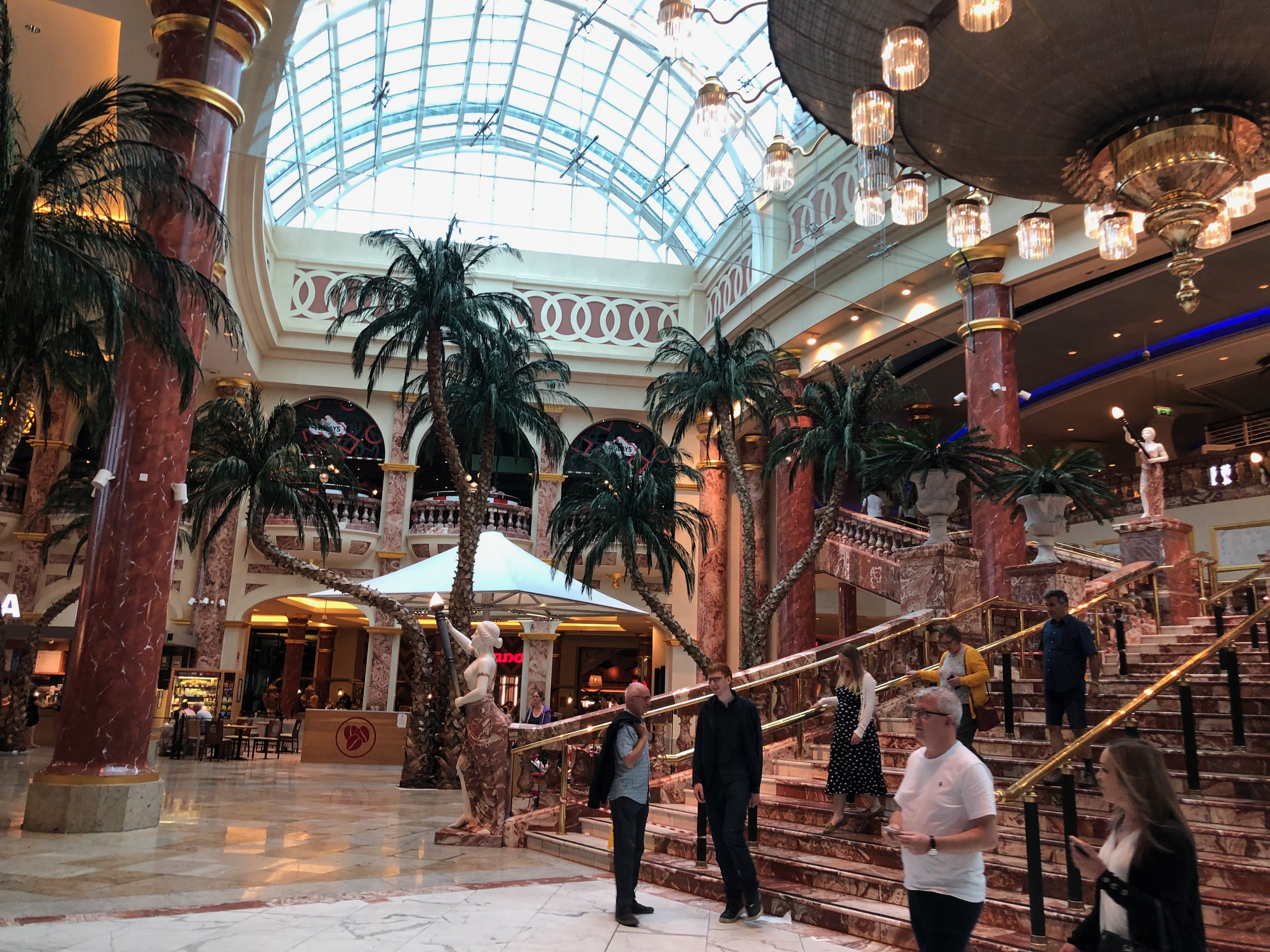
The Great Hall showing the marble staircase, chandelier and palm trees

An extension to The Orient known as The Great Hall opened in March 2007 replacing an outdoor piazza known as The Place. It's glazed structure houses five restaurants and cafes. Construction took 18 months at a cost of £26 million and incorporates a grand marble staircase The centre claims its Great Hall has the largest chandelier in the world at 11 metres (36 ft) wide and 15 metres (49 ft) high. The feature incorporates three internal maintenance walkways and weighs five ton.

=== Trafford Palazzo (formerly Barton Square) ===
A 19,000 m^{2} (200,000 sq ft), extension to the Trafford Centre opened as Barton Square on 20 March 2008, at a cost of £90 million. Barton Square was originally intended to house retailers specialising in homeware, furniture, appliances and other 'bulky goods'.

Barton Square was spun off as a separate entity to the Trafford Centre during the collapse of Intu in 2020. It was then put up for sale as part of the administration process with an asking price in excess of £50 million. In May 2021 Peel Land and Property, its original developers announced they had re-acquired the centre for an undisclosed sum. Peel subsequently re branded the centre to Trafford Palazzo in November 2021. Trafford Palazzo now operates as a rival centre to the Trafford Centre.

A £75 million, 110,000 sq ft (10,000 m^{2}) major redevelopment for the centre commenced in mid 2018, which included adding a first floor and a glazed roof to fully enclose the formerly open air centre. The redevelopment work was completed in March 2020.

== Facilities ==
The centre has around 200 stores and services and is one of the largest shopping centre in the United Kingdom by floor area.

=== Anchor tenants ===
The following anchor retail tenants have operated at the centre.

Retailer	Location	Opened	Closed	Floor space on opening	Notes
Selfridges	The Dome	10 September 1998		160,000 sq ft (15,000 m^{2})	
Debenhams	Regent Crescent	10 September 1998	15 May 2021	135,000 sq ft (12,500 m^{2})	The space left by Debenhams has been occupied by Marks and Spencer since late 2023.
BHS	Regent Crescent	10 September 1998	January 2017	60,000 sq ft (5,600 m^{2})	Only one floor was occupied at the time of closure
Boots	Peel Avenue	10 September 1998		55,000 sq ft (5,100 m^{2})	
C&A	Peel Avenue	10 September 1998	2001	46,000 sq ft (4,300 m^{2})	
Marks & Spencer	Peel Avenue	3 July 2001	29 November 2023	46,000 sq ft (4,300 m^{2})	Former C&A unit, was expanded several times after opening before relocating to a larger unit in 2023 at the end of Regent Crescent.
John Lewis	Peel Avenue	30 May 2005		205,000 sq ft (19,000 m^{2})	Former Festival Village area
Marks & Spencer	Regent Crescent	30 November 2023		135,000 sq ft (12,500 m^{2})	Relocated from the original Peel Avenue unit to the former Debenhams unit at the end of Regent Crescent; spanning only 2 floors instead of 4 but with a larger retail space.

=== Leisure ===
Leisure facilities include a 20-screen Odeon cinema; Laser Quest arena and Paradise Island Adventure Golf; all of which are located on the Second Floor around the central dome. A Namco amusement arcade with dodgems and bowling is located in The Orient.

Between 2002 and 2004, the area occupied by Paradise Island Adventure Golf was originally home to an interactive children's ride called Dreamieland, dubbed "Britain's first shopping centre-based theme ride". It closed after only two years due to poor attendance, before Paradise Island took its place in 2008.

=== Other facilities ===
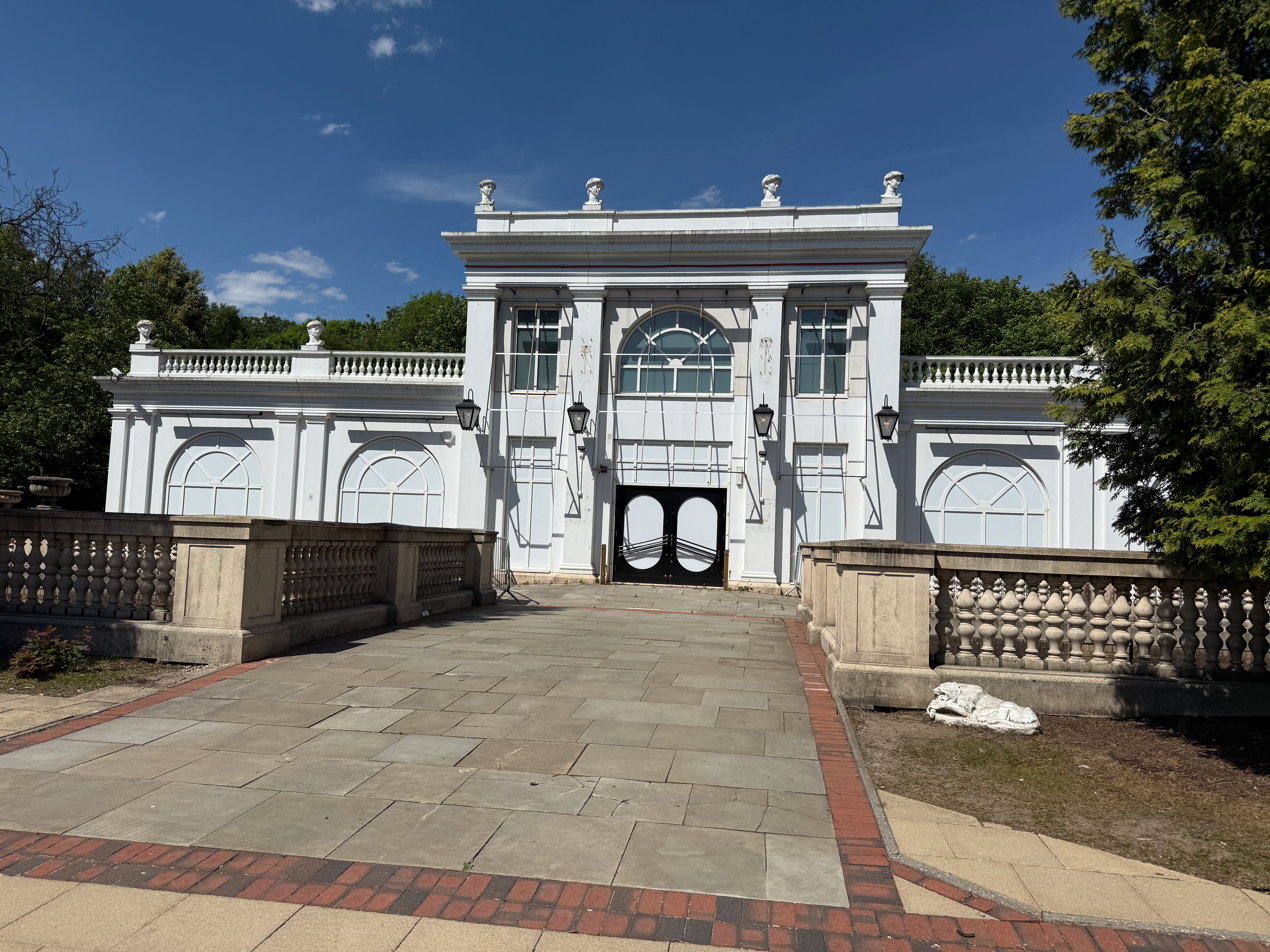
The Orangery building in an abandoned state

The centre opened with a hotel and pub on site in separate buildings. The 60-bedroom hotel was known as The Coach House and was operated by Premier Inn and featured a Brewers Fayre pub restaurant. The restaurant was rebranded as Brewsters in 2000, bringing about more children's entertainment, before returning to the more successful Brewers Fayre brand around summer 2005.

The pub, known as The Orangery was situated adjacent to the hotel. The building housed various food and beverage operators over the years but as of 2025 it is vacant.

Both buildings are located adjacent to a wooded area known as Wilderspool Wood which is some distance from the main building and were designed to resemble the outbuildings of a stately home.

In September 2024 a planning application was submitted to Trafford Council asking for permission to demolish the hotel building. The application stated that the hotel had been closed since June 2023, and that the vacant building was attracting antisocial behaviour. The hotel building was demolished in 2025.

== Transport ==
As of 2011, 10% of the UK population lived within a 45-minute drive of the Trafford Centre.

=== Buses ===
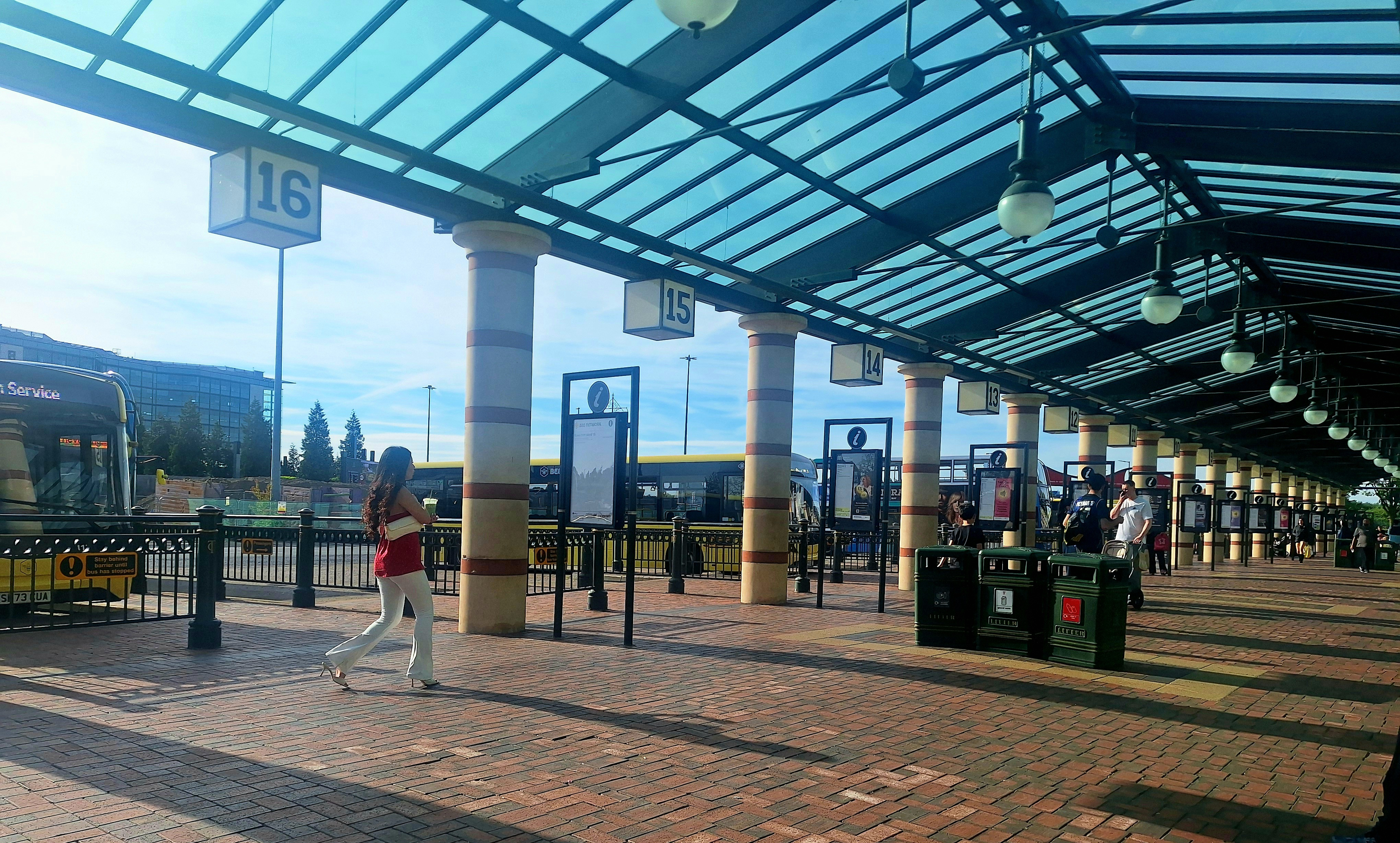
Trafford Centre bus station

The Trafford Centre bus station is situated at the far end of Regent Crescent. It is served by buses to most parts of Greater Manchester and beyond.

=== Roads ===
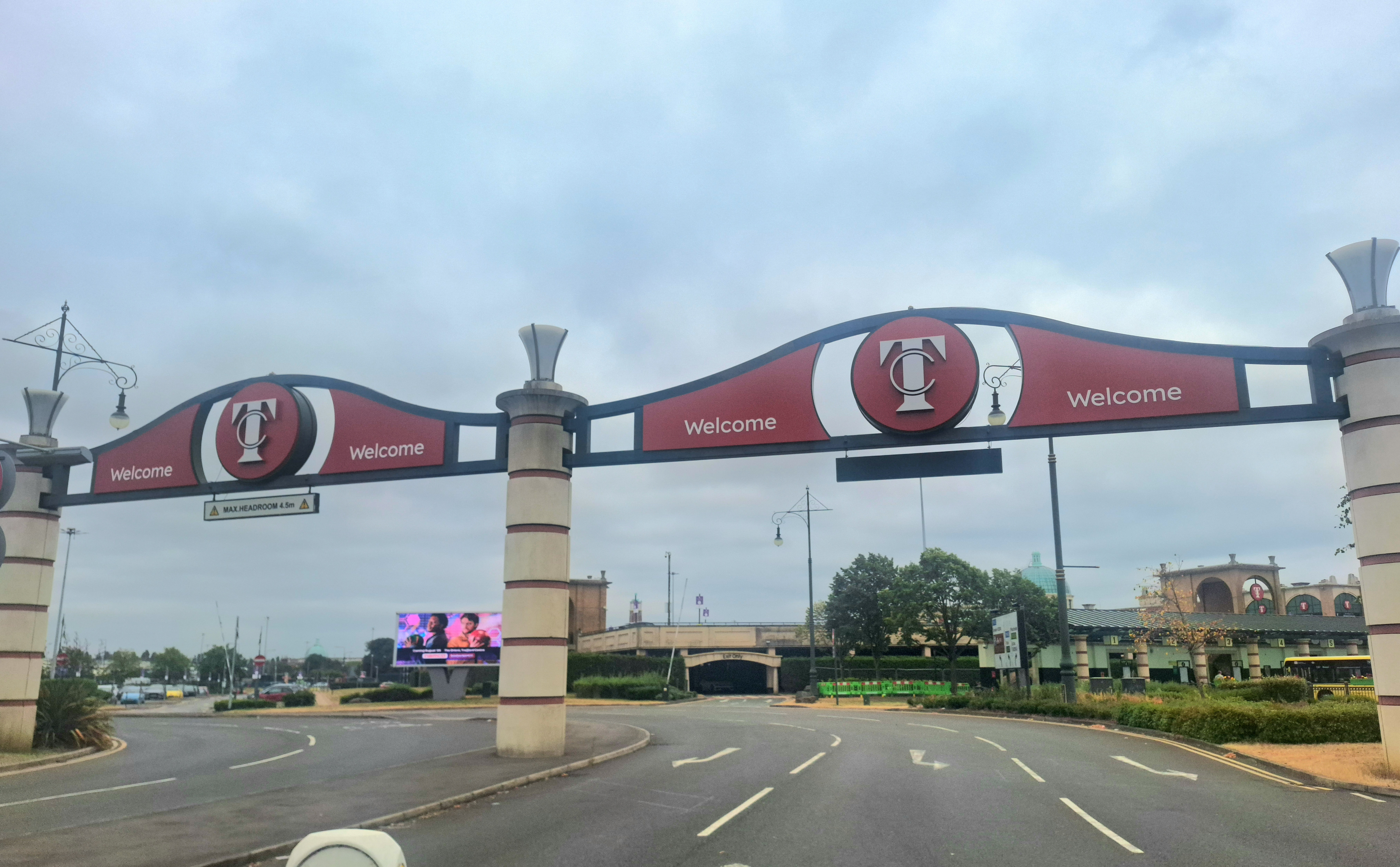
Trafford Centre vehicle entrance

The Trafford Centre has 12,500 car spaces and 350 coach spaces; it is sited off the M60, between junctions 9 and 10. Its popularity has resulted in traffic congestion on the M60 Barton High-Level Bridge, requiring a link road adjacent to the M60 crossing the ship canal on a new lift bridge.

All vehicles entering the centre have number plate details recorded via automatic number plate recognition. Since its introduction in 2003 at a cost of £220,000, the system has reduced the number of thefts of and from vehicles to a level described as "negligible". The ANPR tracks cars which have been used for serious offences and details of any car with such a number plate can then be passed to Stretford Police station.

In November 2024, premium car parking was introduced allowing customers access to larger parking spaces close to the entrance for an hourly fee. Valet services can be purchased on top of the standard ticket price. Premium parking is located on the upper level of the Peel Avenue car park.

The centre has facilities for electric vehicle charging within its car parks.

=== Trams ===
Manchester Metrolink tram stops

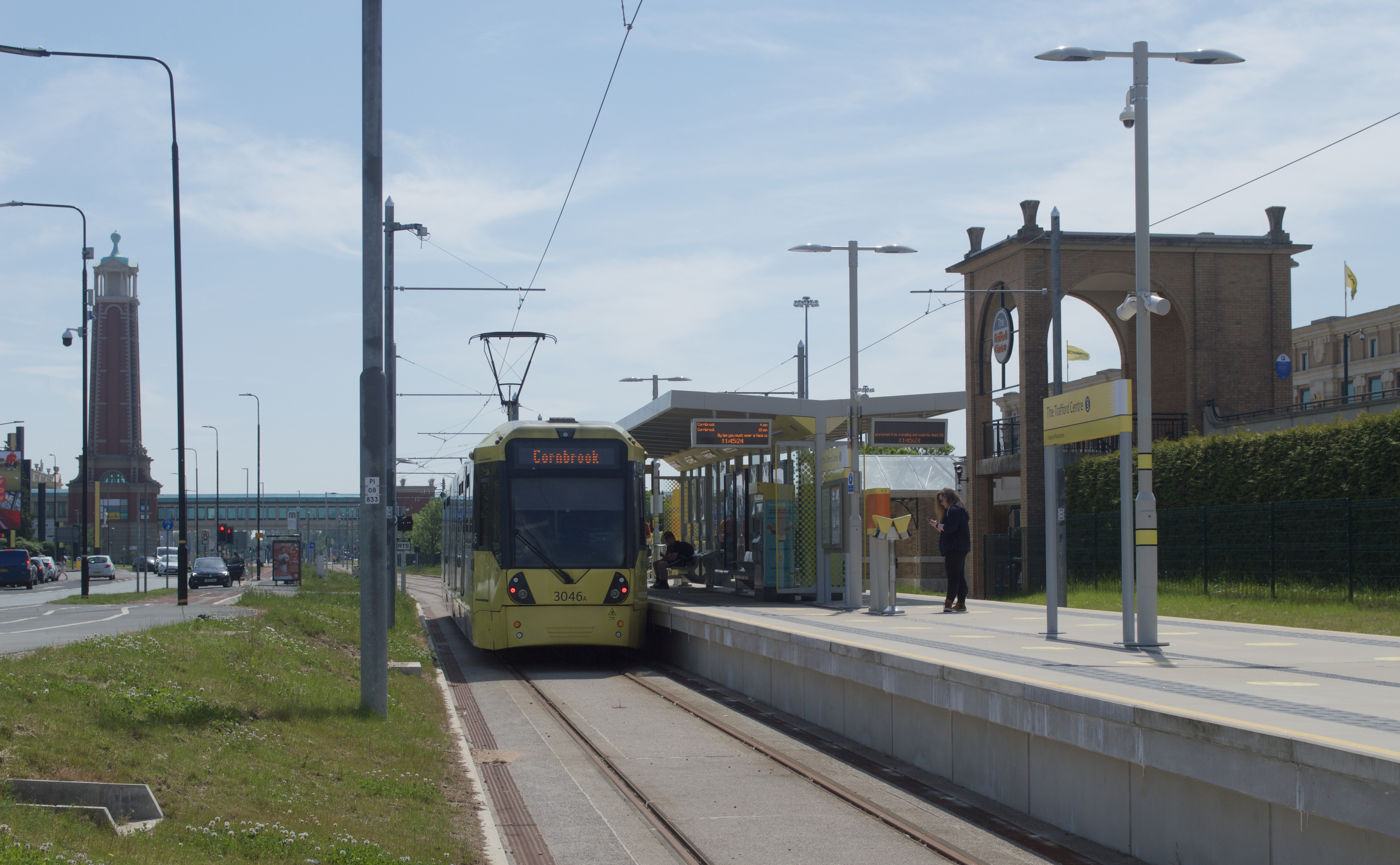
The Trafford Centre tram stop

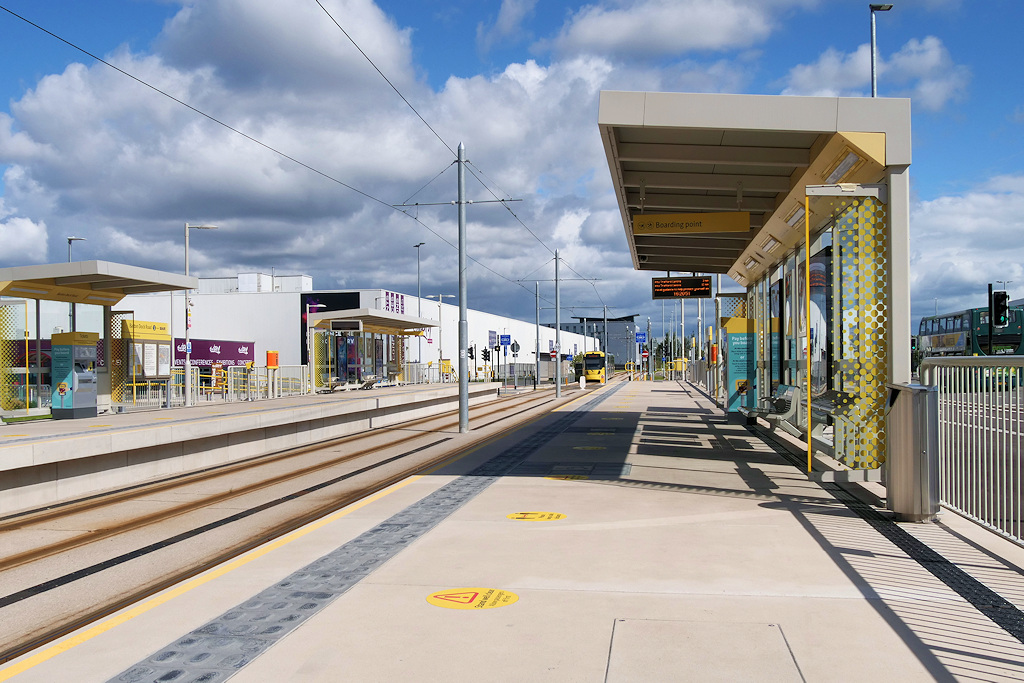
Trafford Palazzo tram stop

The centre is served by two stops on the Trafford Park Line of the Manchester Metrolink network:

- The terminus, The Trafford Centre tram stop, serves the west of the centre
- The Trafford Palazzo tram stop serves the east of the centre and Trafford Palazzo.

Plans for Metrolink to serve the Trafford Centre had been in place since before the centre had planning permission, with Peel Group originally promising to contribute £16 million in funding.

Construction of the Trafford Park Line began in January 2017. Test trams began in November 2019 and the line opened from Pomona to the Trafford Centre on 22 March 2020.

From 1998 to 2020, a shuttle bus had connected Stretford tram stop and the Trafford Centre.

The tram services at the Trafford Centre and run to Crumpsall via City centre via Exchange square.

== In popular culture ==
- Featured in 2008 BBC documentary series, Britain From Above, highlighted a transition from industry to services.
- The Orient food court was used as a location in the 2008 post-apocalyptic drama Survivors.
- Focal point of BBC's 2010 The Apprentice week 5 when contestants sold clothes.
- Featured in a 2017 BBC Radio 4 Documentary, The Stately Pleasure Dome which explored the poetry of the centre's architecture
- The Dome and parts of Peel Avenue and Regent Crescent were featured in the 2025 CBeebies show, I Spy, You Spy.

== See also ==
- Trafford Waters
- List of shopping centres in the United Kingdom
- Manchester Arndale
- Economy of Manchester
