= John Whittaker (businessman) =

British billionaire businessman (born 1942)

- Born: 14 March 1942 (age 84); Bury, Lancashire, England
- Occupation: Businessman
- Title: Chairman, the Peel Group
- Spouse: Patricia Whittaker
- Children: 4

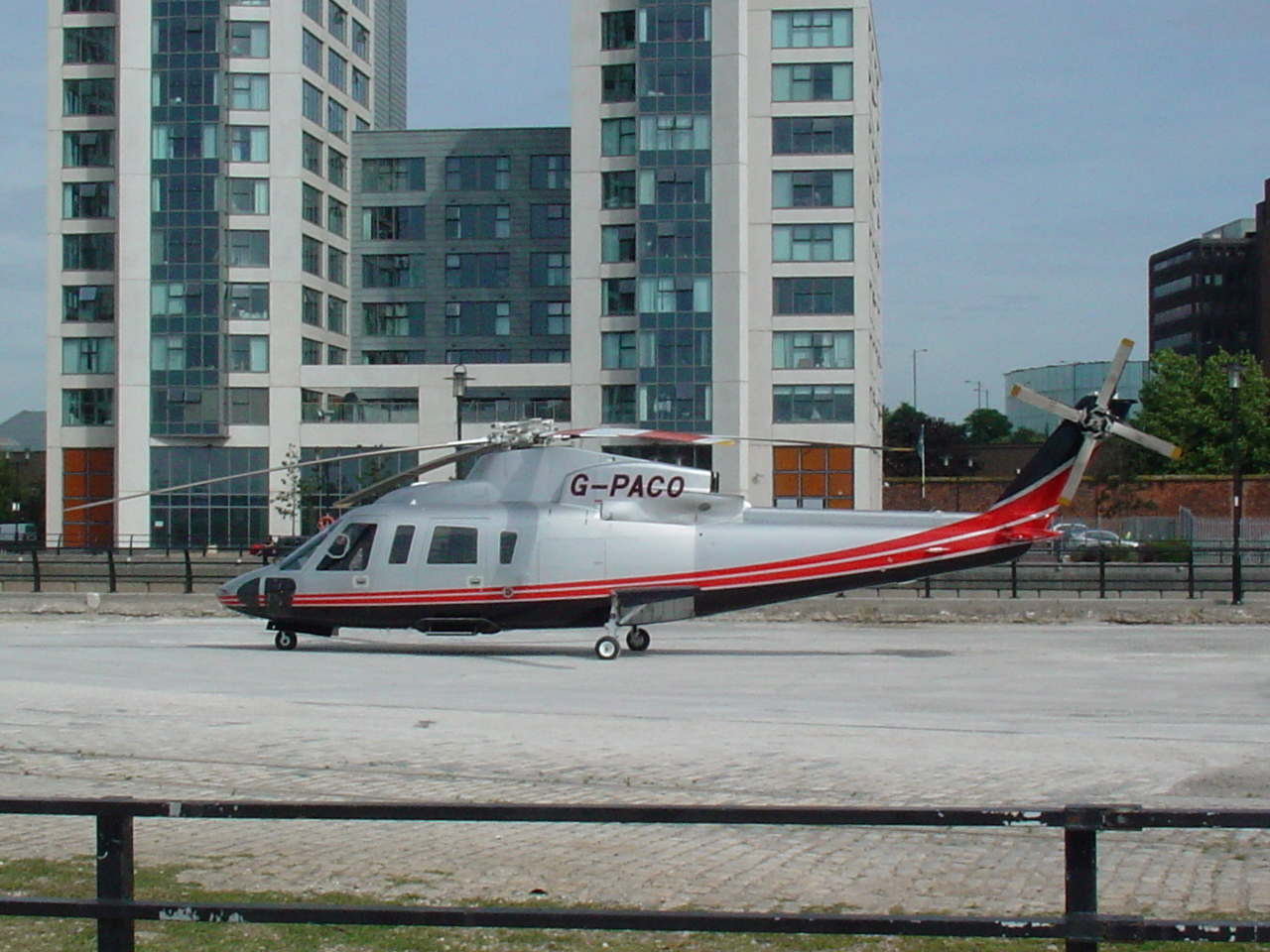
John Whittaker's Peel Holdings helicopter (G-PACO) lands at Princes Quay, Liverpool)

John Whittaker (born 14 March 1942) is a British billionaire. He is chairman of the Peel Group, a property business that mainly invests in North West England. Although publicity-shy, he has been described as one of the most influential business leaders for Greater Manchester and the North West by the Manchester Evening News (2007), and was named the most influential northerner by The Big Issue magazine in 2010.

== Early life ==
Whittaker was born to Jack and May Whittaker in Bury, Lancashire in 1942. He was educated at Prior Park College, a Catholic boarding school in Bath, Somerset, and considered becoming a priest before deciding to join the family business.

== Career ==
In the 1980s he fought a bitter battle to take over the Manchester Ship Canal Company, out of which the Trafford Centre emerged.

Whittaker's Peel Group sold the 1.5m sq ft Trafford Centre to Capital Shopping Centres (now Intu Properties) in January 2011. Under the terms of the deal, which valued the Manchester scheme at £1.6 billion, his company, Peel, took shares in CSC worth £636m and he joined its board as deputy chairman. Whittaker resigned as deputy chairman in July 2020 following the company going into administration.

In 2010, his wealth doubled from £1.01 billion to £2.07 billion, mainly thanks to the £1.65 billion sale of the Trafford Centre.

In 2013, Peel Group started an Ocean Gateway project, aiming to transform 50 miles of industrial land between the Port of Liverpool and Salford Docks into a £50 billion redevelopment called "Ocean Gateway". Whittaker hoped the Manchester development would become a Chinese business hub. He accompanied the Prime Minister on his trade mission to Beijing in 2010.

In June 2019, The Sunday Times reported that Peel was liquidating stakes in Peel Ports and Liverpool airport to cover losses at Intu Properties where Peel Group owned 27.3%.

== Business reputation ==
In 2010 when Simon Property Group attempted to purchase the Trafford Centre, insiders saw Whittaker as "formidable opposition" and a "very astute, very clever and a very good businessman". One such example of his astute business mind was convincing the BBC to reject three other sites across Manchester to move to MediaCityUK in Salford Quays. The presence of the BBC would then act as a magnet to attract independent production companies to Salford and the Peel Group would make money from the rent and lease agreements on the development.

== Personal life ==
Whittaker lives on the Isle of Man. He has four children. Whittaker has been regarded as a publicity-shy businessman who rarely gives interviews.

According to The Sunday Times Rich List in 2025, Whittaker is worth £2 billion.
