= Stockport power station =

Former coal-fired power station

- Country: England
- Location: Stockport
- Coordinates: 53°24′44″N 02°09′15″W
- Status: Decommissioned
- Construction began: 1897
- Commission date: 1899
- Decommission date: 1976
- Owners: Stockport Corporation (1891–1948); British Electricity Authority (1948–1955); Central Electricity Authority (1955–1957); Central Electricity Generating Board (1958–1976)
- Operator: As owner

Thermal power station
- Primary fuel: Coal
- Turbine technology: Steam turbines
- Cooling towers: 3
- Cooling source: River water and cooling towers

Power generation
- Units operational: 1 x 12.5 MW, 1 x 20 MW, 2 x 30 MW
- Make and model: English Electric, Escher Wyss, Fraser & Chalmers, Richardson Westgarth
- Annual net output: 241,693 MWh (1946)

Stockport power station supplied electricity to the town of Stockport, Cheshire and the surrounding area from 1899 to 1976. The power station was owned and operated by Stockport Corporation prior to the nationalisation of the British electricity supply industry in 1948. It was redeveloped several times to meet the increased demand for electricity.

== History ==
In 1891 Stockport Corporation applied for a Provisional Order under the Electric Lighting Acts to generate and supply electricity to the town. The Stockport Electric Lighting Order 1891 was granted by the Board of Trade and was confirmed by Parliament through the Electric Lighting Orders Confirmation (No. 2) Act 1891 (54 & 55 Vict. c. l) however it wasn't until 1897 before it was decided to provide lighting. The power station was built in Millgate, Stockport (53°24′44″N 2°09′15″W) and it first supplied electricity in 1899. Further equipment was added to meet the rising demand for electricity; by 1922 it had a generating capacity of 22,000 kW. A 20,000kW Escher Wyss turbine driving a Brown Boveri alternator was installed in 1931.

From the establishment of the Stockport Corporation Tramways in 1901 the power station supplied electric current to tram system. The trams were decommissioned in 1951.

Stockport power station became a selected station in the North West England and North Wales Electricity Scheme. It was part of one of three national grid rings in the northwest. Other stations in the Stockport ring were Manchester, Tame Valley and Oldham.

The British electricity supply industry was nationalised in 1948 under the provisions of the Electricity Act 1947 (10 & 11 Geo. 6. c. 54). The Stockport electricity undertaking was abolished, ownership of Stockport power station was vested in the British Electricity Authority, and subsequently the Central Electricity Authority and the Central Electricity Generating Board (CEGB). At the same time the electricity distribution and sales responsibilities of the Stockport electricity undertaking were transferred to the North Western Electricity Board (NORWEB).

Stockport power station was closed on 25 October 1976. The power station was subsequently demolished.

Stockport Hydro is a hydro-electric generating station located at Otterspool Weir on the River Goyt at Marple, Stockport. It comprises two Archimedes screws with a total output of 68 kW. It was commissioned in October 2012 and in its first year generated 180 MWh of electricity which was fed into the national grid.

== Equipment specification ==
Initial plant installed in 1898 was two Tetlow Brothers Lancashire boilers hand fired that provided steam to five generating sets.

3 x Willians 90HP engines driving McClure and Whitfield 56 kW dynamos

2 x Willians 240HP engines driving McClure and Whitfield 140 kW dynamos

By 1923 the plant comprised boilers delivering 288,000 lb/h (36.3 kg/s) of steam to:

- 3 × 5,000 kW steam turbo-alternators AC
- 1 × 5,500 kW steam turbo-alternator AC
- 3 × 500 kW reciprocating engines with DC generator

These machines gave a total generating capacity of 22,000 kW comprising 20,500 kW of alternating current (AC) plus 1,500 kW of direct current (DC).

The following electricity supplies were available to consumers:

- 400 & 230 Volts, 3-phase, 50 Hz AC
- 460 & 230 Volts DC
- 500 V DC Traction current

=== Plant in 1954 ===
By 1954 the plant comprised:

- Boilers:
  - 1 × Babcock & Wilcox 20,000 lb/h (2.52 kg/s) boiler, steam conditions were 220 psi and 650 °F (15.2 bar and 343 °C),
  - 1 × Babcock & Wilcox 25,000 lb/h (3.15 kg/s) boiler, steam conditions as above,
  - 1 × Babcock & Wilcox 40,000 lb/h (5.04 kg/s) boiler, steam conditions as above,
  - 3 × Simon Carves 150,000 lb/h (18.9 kg/s) boilers, steam conditions were 425 psi and 825 °F (29.3 bar and 441 °C),
  - 1 × Simon Carves 300,000 lb/h (37.8 kg/s) boiler, steam conditions were 625 psi and 850 °F (43.1 bar and 454 °C). This was one of the UK's earliest unit boilers dedicated to a 30 MW turbo-alternator.

There was a total steam raising capability of 835,000 lb/h (105.2 kg/s); steam was supplied to:

- Generators:
  - 1 × 12.5 MW English Electric turbo-alternator (installed 1926)
  - 1 × 20 MW Escher Wyss turbo-alternator (installed 1931)
  - 1 × 30 MW Fraser & Chalmers turbo-alternator (installed 1940)
  - 1 × 30 MW Richardson Westgarth turbo-alternator (installed 1943)

The total generating capacity was 92.5 MW at 6.6 kV.

Condenser cooling water was drawn from the nearby River Goyt and there were three cooling towers, with a capacity of 2.8 million gallons per hour (3.53 m^{3}/s).

== Operations ==
=== Operating data 1921–23 ===
The electricity supply data for the period 1921–23 was:

Stockport power station supply data 1921–23
Electricity Use	Units	Year		
Electricity Use	Units	1921	1922	1923
Lighting and domestic	MWh	1,603	2,450	2,340
Public lighting	MWh	200	200	200
Traction	MWh	3,110	3,128	3,092
Power	MWh	15,693	16,178	21,240
Bulk supply	MWh	0	0	0
Total use	MWh	20,606	21,956	26,872

The electricity Loads on the system were:

Year		1921	1922	1923
Maximum load	kW	9,086	9,256	12,900
Total connections	kW	24,000	22,583	27,206
Load factor	Per cent	30.2	31.6	28.8

Revenue from the sale of current (in 1923) was £139,950; the surplus of revenue over expenses was £69,638.

=== Operating data 1946 ===
In 1946 Stockport power station supplied 241,693 MWh of electricity, the maximum output load was 72,580 kW. The load factor was 39.8%, and the thermal efficiency was 21.67%.

=== Operating data 1954–72 ===
Operating data for the period 1954–72 was:

Stockport power station operating data, 1954–72
Year	Running hours or load factor (per cent)	Max output capacity MW	Electricity supplied MWh	Thermal efficiency per cent
High pressure
1954	6966	28	128,479	24.94
1955	6078	28	111,248	23.78
1956	5096	28	99,253	22.37
1957	4285	28	82,687	22.55
1958	4563	28	90,878	2.61
Low pressure
1954	2987	47	83,416	13.95
1955	3356	47	65,680	14.78
1956	2740	47	41,517	15.07
1957	1691	47	38,130	14.92
1958	2459	47	49,173	16.66
Combined output
1961	13.6 %	72	85,754	19.71
1962	29.21 %	71	181,660	19.12
1963	30.3 %	71	191,199	18.95
1967	26.2 %	77	176,985	20.22
1972	6.4 %	66	37,357	17.50

Output of Stockport power station in MWh

== Stockport Electricity District ==
Following nationalisation Stockport power station became part of the Stockport electricity supply district, covering 19 square miles (49.2 km^{2}) with a population of 159,000 in 1958. The number of consumers and electricity sold in the Stockport district was:

Year	1956	1957	1958
Number of consumers	55,185	56,085	56,690
Electricity sold MWh	179,400	191,208	202,970

In 1958 the number of units sold to categories of consumers was:

Type of consumer	No. of consumers	Electricity sold MWh
Domestic	50,952	74,066
Commercial	2,936	20,725
Combined	2,067	7,420
Industrial	663	98,247
Farms	79	413
Public lighting	2	2,099
Total	56,690	202,970

The maximum demand was 65,700 kW, the load factor was 35.3%.

== See also ==
- Timeline of the UK electricity supply industry
- List of power stations in England
