= Trafford Quays tram stop =

Proposed tram stop in Manchester, England

Trafford Quays

General information
- Location: Trafford Park, Trafford; England
- System: Metrolink station
- Line: Trafford Park Line

Other information
- Status: Proposed station
Route map

Trafford Quays is a proposed tram stop for Greater Manchester's Metrolink light rail system, that would be created to serve passengers boarding and alighting at the Trafford Waters development area. Mapping from 2012 shows the stop labelled as Trafford Quays, but an updated map from 2025, shows the stop named as Trafford Waters.

The line as far as The Trafford Centre has been built and opened in March 2020, but this stop is not yet a committed scheme.

Preceding station	Manchester Metrolink	Following station
Proposed
Salford Reds towards Port Salford	Trafford Centre Line (planned)	Trafford Centre towards Crumpsall
