= Trafford Palazzo tram stop =

Manchester Metrolink tram stop

Trafford Palazzo
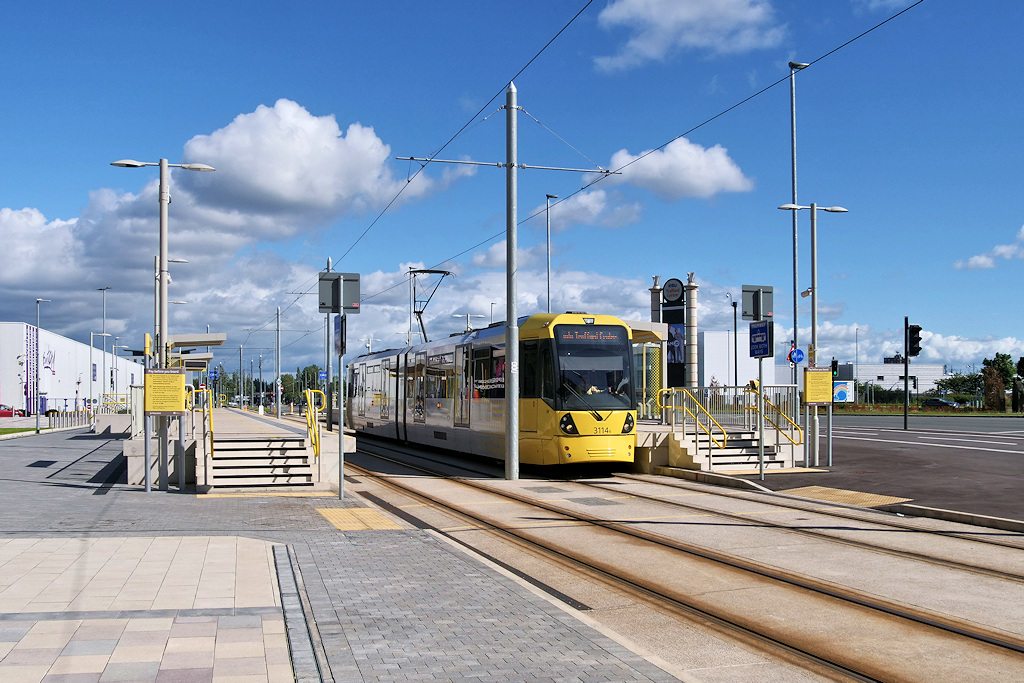
- Barton Dock Road tram stop in operation in July 2020.

General information
- Location: Trafford Park, Trafford; England
- Coordinates: 53.46576°N 2.34205°W
- System: Manchester Metrolink
- Operator: KeolisAmey
- Transit authority: Transport for Greater Manchester
- Line: Trafford Park Line
- Platforms: 2
- Tram routes

Construction
- Structure type: At-grade
- Accessible: Yes

Other information
- Status: In operation
- Station code: -
- Fare zone: 3
- Website: Trafford Palazzo tram stop

History
- Opened: 22 March 2020; 6 years ago

Key dates
- 22 March 2020: Opened as Barton Dock Road
- 28 October 2025: Renamed Trafford Palazzo
Route map
Location

Trafford Palazzo (previously Barton Dock Road) is a Manchester Metrolink tram stop in Trafford Park, Trafford. It is on the Trafford Park Line and in fare zone 3. This stop was opened on 22 March 2020 and has step-free access.

The stop is located on Barton Dock Road at street-level by the Peel Circle roundabout, and is right next to the main entrance to Trafford Palazzo. It has been recently renamed from Barton Dock Road after a partnership with TfGM and the Peel Group.

== History ==
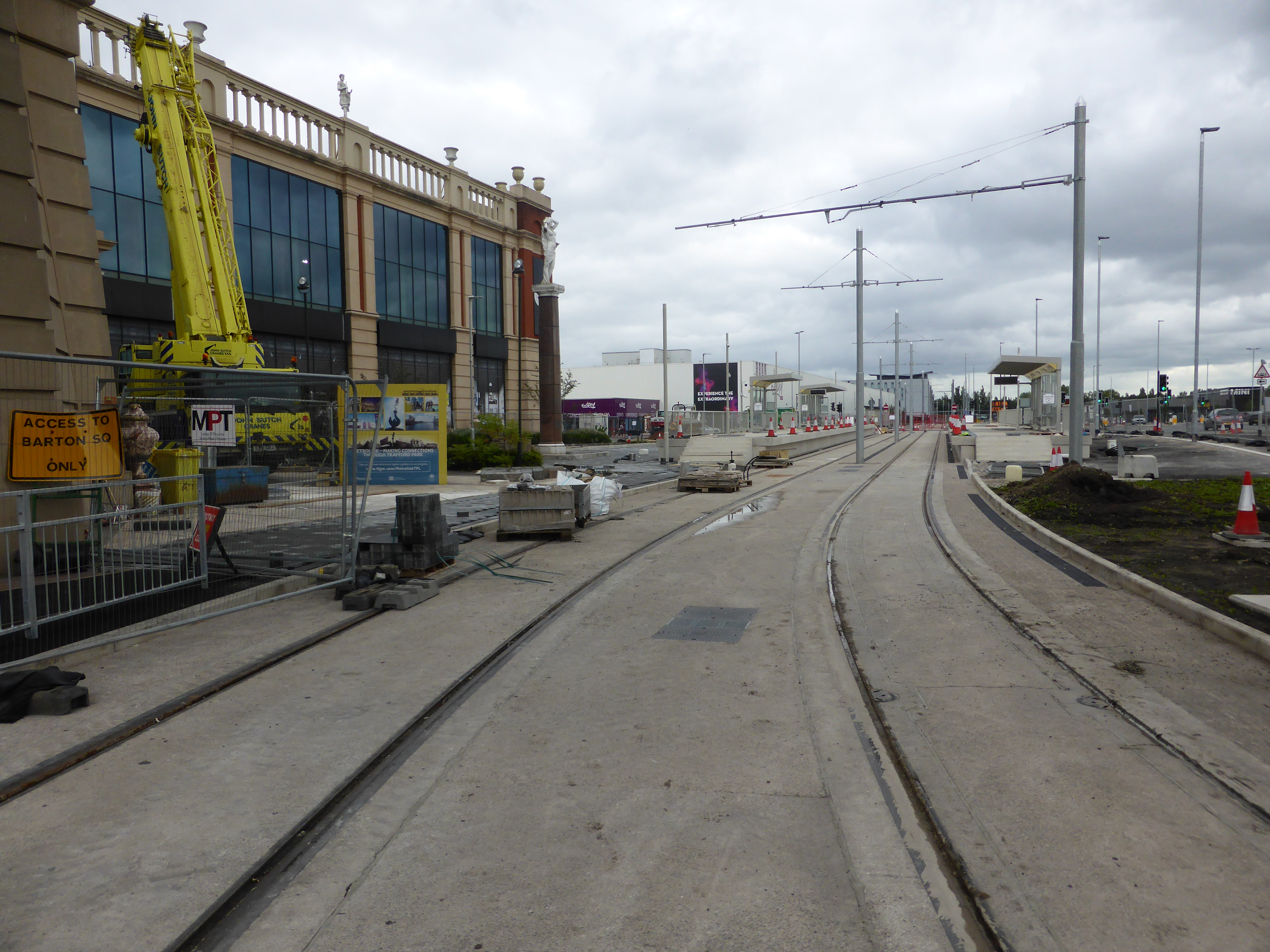
Barton Dock Road tram stop during construction phase: August 2019

=== Prior to opening ===
Plans for the Trafford Park Line have existed since at least 1990, but no funding was provided to construct the line at that time. In 1995, The Trafford Centre was granted planning permission and provision for Metrolink was designed into its grounds.

The 2000s proposal for the Trafford Park Line included a "Lostock Parkway" stop on the disused Trafford Park Railway freight line adjacent to Park Way (A5081), next to the now empty site that the Barton Dock freight terminal used to take up. By 2010, the line had reached the top of Metrolink's development priorities and TFGM began to conceive a concrete plan to construct it.

In around 2014, the plan and routing around this stop changed again, this time the proposed stop being located in its current space next to the main entrance to Trafford Palazzo (at the time the building was named Barton Square). The tram stop's name was to be EventCity, serving the exhibition/conference centre of the same name.

At some point during planning stages, another name, "Giants Field", was raised for the tram stop.

In October 2016, power to build the line was granted by the Secretary of State for Transport, and construction commenced in January 2017, with the tram stop being named EventCity, however extremely late in development a change was made. EventCity announced plans to move to a new location in September 2019 (a few months prior to the Trafford Park Line's opening), which meant that the tram stop's name had to be changed again, this time to Barton Dock Road. Furthermore, in early 2020, it was announced that the EventCity venue would be closing down entirely following 31 March 2021.

=== After opening ===
This tram stop, along with the Trafford Park Line, was finally opened as Barton Dock Road on 22 March 2020, and the first passenger service tram (3073) stopped at Barton Dock Road just after 06:49.

In October 2025, the stop was once again renamed to its current "Trafford Palazzo", after the Trafford Palazzo shopping centre where the stop is located, following a partnership with TfGM and the Peel Group who own Trafford Palazzo.

== Layout ==
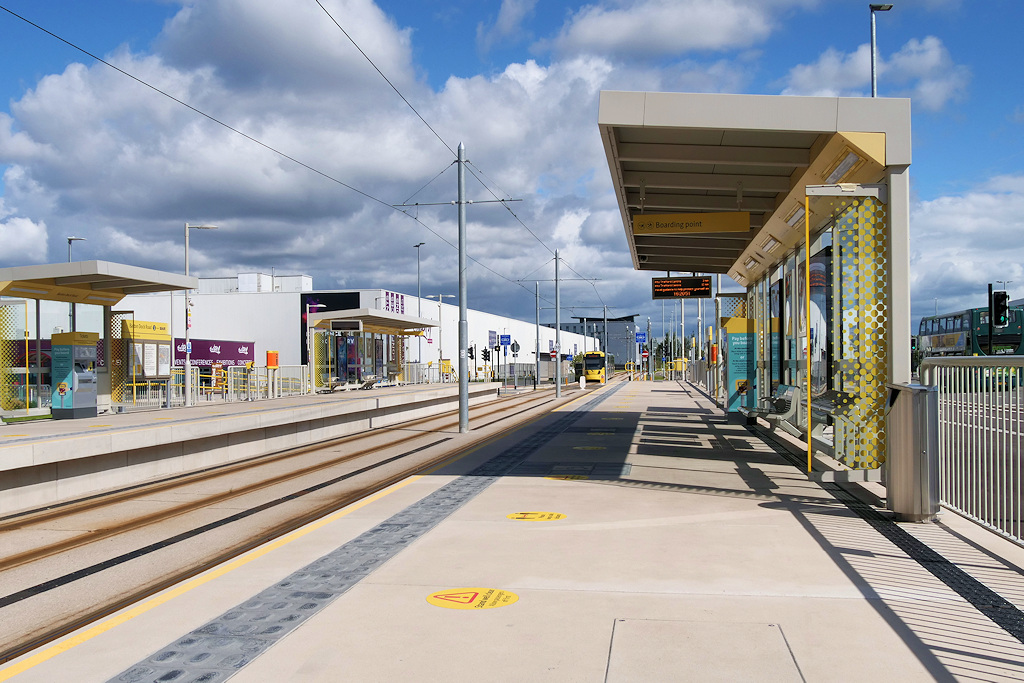
Barton Dock Road tram stop, taken from the outbound platform: July 2020

Trafford Palazzo tram stop was constructed with accessibility in mind. The stop is fully accessible via ramps and steps at each end of the platforms. Two dot matrix passenger information displays stand on one platform each, and show estimated arrival times for trams in minutes up to 30 minutes prior (up to three at a time) and number of carriages.

Peel Circle roundabout on Barton Dock Road was remodelled to accommodate the new tram line and station. The roundabout was made smaller and a few road junctions nearby were shifted around. Also added was a tram crossing on Barton Dock Road between the tram stop and the terminus, The Trafford Centre, running directly underneath a link bridge connecting Trafford Palazzo and the Trafford Centre.

== Services ==
Every route across the Manchester Metrolink network operates to a 12-minute headway (5 tph) Monday–Saturday, and to a 15-minute headway (4 tph) on Sundays and bank holidays. Sections served by a second "peak only" route (unlike this stop) will have a combined headway of 6 minutes during peak times.

Trafford Palazzo is located in Zone 3 and the stop itself has two platforms. Trams towards Deansgate-Castlefield in Manchester depart from the inbound platform (north), and trams one stop to The Trafford Centre stop at the outbound platform (south).

Preceding station	Manchester Metrolink	Following station
The Trafford Centre Terminus	The Trafford Centre–Deansgate	Parkway towards Deansgate-Castlefield

== Transport connections ==
=== Bus ===
This tram stop is served by Bee Network bus routes 150 (Gorton–The Trafford Centre) and 250 (Manchester–The Trafford Centre).

=== Train ===
This tram stop is not connected to or near to any railway stations, but the nearest is Trafford Park, and is about 1.6 miles (2.6 km) away walking.

== Incidents ==
- 12 February 2025: A taxi and a tram collided between Barton Dock Road and The Trafford Centre tram stops, which temporarily halted service between Imperial War Museum and The Trafford Centre. The incident was reported by the Manchester Evening News at 19:52 GMT, however doesn't have much coverage online.

== See also ==
- Trafford Palazzo
