= Village tram stop =

Manchester Metrolink tram stop

Village
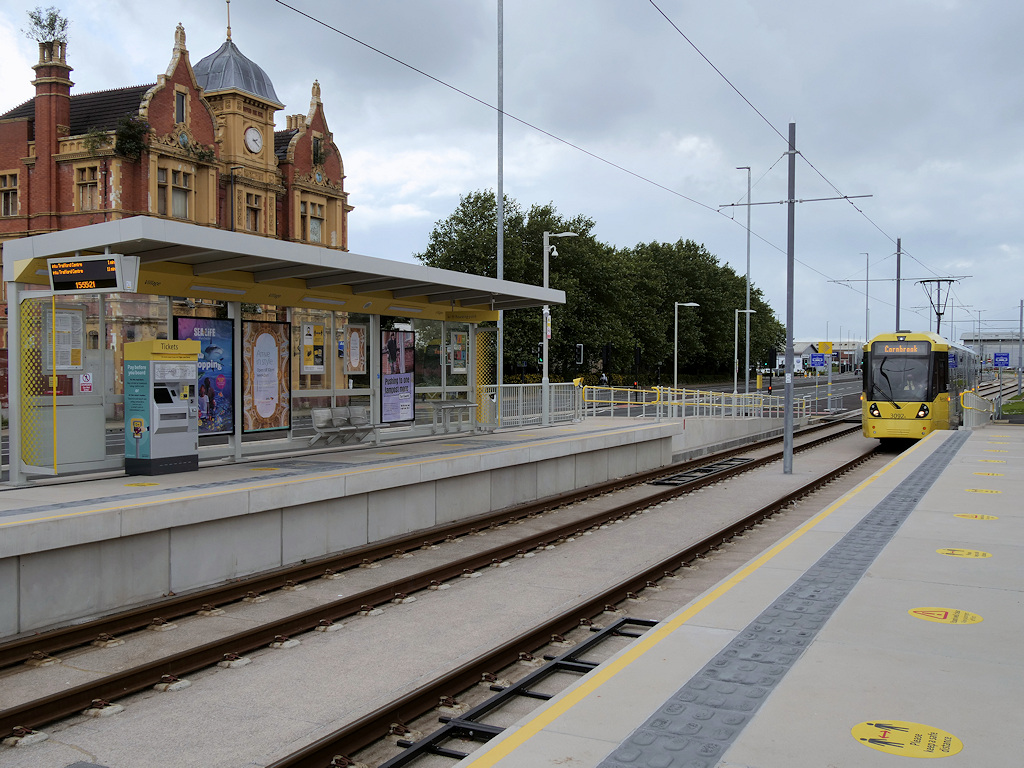

General information
- Location: Trafford Park, Trafford; England
- Coordinates: 53.46741°N 2.30914°W
- System: Metrolink station
- Line: Trafford Park Line
- Platforms: 2

Other information
- Status: In operation
- Fare zone: 2

Key dates
- 22 March 2020: Opened
Route map
Location

Village is a tram stop on the Manchester Metrolink's Trafford Park Line. It is located adjacent to Village Way and is close to the Village Circle roundabout, its namesake. It opened on 22 March 2020.

It was the least used stop on the Trafford Park Line in the 2021/22 financial year.

== History ==
Some of the tram tracks around Village run very close to the alignments of the now derelict Trafford Park Railway.

=== Pre-opening ===
In 2013, the GMCA and the Greater Manchester Local Enterprise Partnership announced that it may fund the construction of the Trafford Park Line as far as The Trafford Centre, estimating that the line could be open to passengers by 2018/19, subject to a satisfactory business case, Transport and Works Act Order and public consultation.

=== Opening ===
The stop opened to passengers on 22 March 2020, and the first passenger service tram (3073) stopped at Village just before 06:43.

== Services ==
Services run every 12 minutes on all routes. Some routes (not shown here) only run during peak times. From this stop, services run to Castlefield in Manchester city centre in one direction and to The Trafford Centre in the other.

Preceding station	Manchester Metrolink	Following station
Parkway towards The Trafford Centre	The Trafford Centre–Deansgate	Imperial War Museum towards Deansgate-Castlefield

== Transport connections ==
=== Bus ===
There are no bus stops directly serving Village tram stop, but it is served closest by bus route X50 (Worsley–Piccadilly Gardens). Also close by is route 18 (Eccles–Manchester Airport)

=== Train ===
This tram stop is not connected to any railway stations, but the nearest one is Trafford Park, approximately one mile away walking.
