= Wharfside tram stop =

Manchester Metrolink tram stop

Wharfside
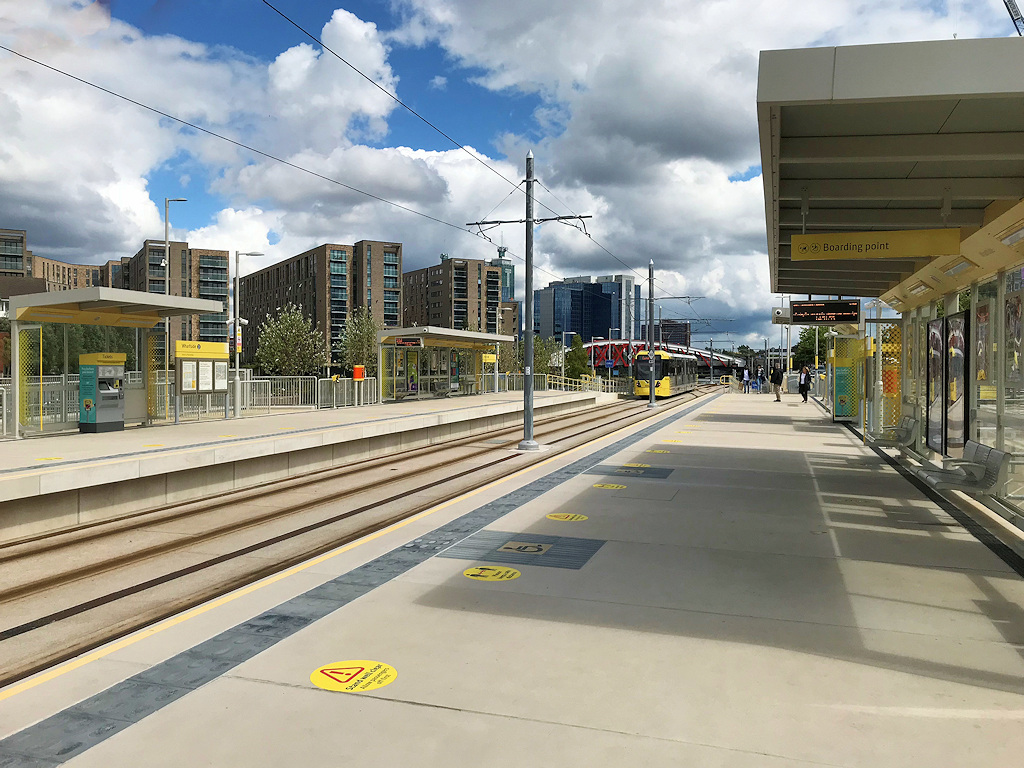

General information
- Location: Trafford Park, Trafford; England
- Coordinates: 53.46631°N 2.28778°W
- System: Metrolink station
- Line: Trafford Park Line
- Platforms: 2

Other information
- Status: In operation
- Fare zone: 2

History
- Opened: 22 March 2020

Passengers
- 2020/21: 40,800
- 2021/22: ▲0.334 million
- 2022/23: ▲0.424 million
- 2023/24: ▲0.511 million
Route map
Location

Wharfside is a tram stop on the Manchester Metrolink's Trafford Park Line. It is located on Trafford Wharf Road, close to the Old Trafford football stadium. It was originally proposed that the station be named Manchester United. It opened on 22 March 2020.

== History ==
Wharfside tram stop and the tram tracks around the area run very close to the alignment of a section of the now derelict Trafford Park Railway.

In 2013, the GMCA and the Greater Manchester Local Enterprise Partnership announced that it may fund the construction of the Trafford Park Line as far as The Trafford Centre, estimating that the line could be open to passengers by 2018/19 (subject to a satisfactory business case, Transport and Works Act Order and public consultation).

The first trams (3040 and 3014 coupled together) passed by Wharfside in the early hours of 10 November 2019 while on test. The stop opened to passengers on 22 March 2020, and the first passenger service tram (3073) stopped at Wharfside at exactly 06:37.

== Layout ==
Wharfside is located next to the Manchester Ship Canal and is the closest tram stop to the Old Trafford football stadium.

The stop has two side platforms. Two dot matrix passenger information displays hang from canopies, and show estimated arrival times for trams in minutes up to 30 minutes prior (up to three at a time) and number of carriages for one platform each.

This stop has full step-free access.

== Services ==
Services run every 12 minutes on all routes. Some routes (not shown here) only run during peak times.

From this stop, services run to Castlefield in Manchester city centre in one direction and to The Trafford Centre in the other.

Preceding station	Manchester Metrolink	Following station
Imperial War Museum towards The Trafford Centre	The Trafford Centre–Deansgate	Pomona towards Deansgate-Castlefield

== Connecting transport ==
=== Bus ===
Wharfside tram stop is served closest by bus route X50 (Worsley–Piccadilly Gardens) and 250 on Wharfside Way (The Trafford Centre–Piccadilly Gardens).

=== Train ===
This tram stop is not connected to any railway stations, but the nearest one is Trafford Park, approximately 1.6 miles away walking.
