= Salford Reds tram stop =

Salford Reds

General information
- Location: Barton-upon-Irwell, Salford; England
- System: Metrolink station
- Line: Trafford Park Line

Other information
- Status: Proposed station
Route map

Salford Reds is a proposed station on a new line of the Metrolink light rail system in Greater Manchester, England, close to Salford City Stadium, home to Salford Red Devils rugby league and Sale Sharks rugby union clubs.

The line has so far been constructed as far as The Trafford Centre but this stop is not yet a committed scheme.

Preceding station	Manchester Metrolink	Following station
Proposed
Port Salford Terminus	Trafford Centre Line (planned)	Trafford Quays towards Crumpsall
