= Parkway tram stop =

Manchester Metrolink tram stop

Parkway
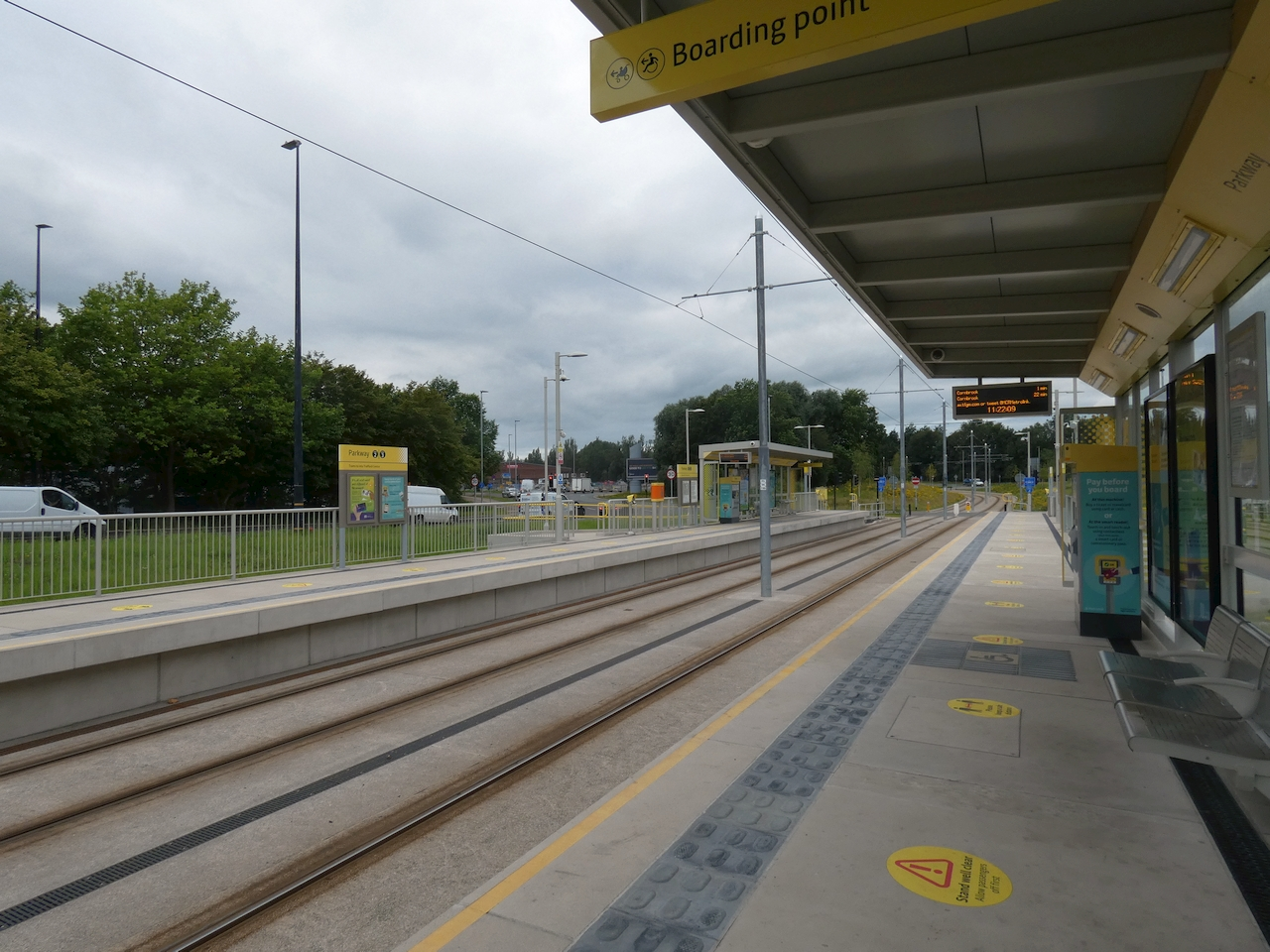

General information
- Location: Trafford Park, Trafford; England
- Coordinates: 53.46822°N 2.32392°W
- System: Metrolink station
- Line: Trafford Park Line
- Platforms: 2

Other information
- Status: In operation
- Fare zone: 2/3

Key dates
- 22 March 2020: Opened

Services
Preceding station	Manchester Metrolink	Following station
Trafford Palazzo towards The Trafford Centre	The Trafford Centre–Deansgate	Village towards Deansgate-Castlefield
Route map
Location

Parkway (originally proposed as Parkway Circle) is a Manchester Metrolink tram stop built on the line to the Trafford Centre. It is located just east of the Parkway Circle roundabout in Trafford Park and includes a Park & Ride facility. It opened on 22 March 2020.

== Services ==
From this stop a service runs generally every 12 minutes towards Deansgate-Castlefield and towards the Trafford Centre.
