= Trafford Park Development Corporation =

British development corporation (1987–1998)

- Formation: 1987
- Dissolved: 1998
- Headquarters: Trafford Park
- Chair: Bill Morgan
- Chief executive: Mike Shields

The Trafford Park Development Corporation was established by the Second Thatcher ministry as part of an initiative to develop land in the Trafford Park area of Trafford and Salford.

== History ==
The corporation was established as part of an initiative by the future Deputy Prime Minister, Michael Heseltine, in February 1987 during the Second Thatcher ministry. Board members were directly appointed by the minister and overrode local authority planning controls to spend government money on infrastructure. This was a controversial measure in Labour strongholds such as East London, Merseyside and North East England.

The work of the corporation included transforming an extensive area of outdated, semi-derelict industrial property. Its area included Trafford Park and also parts of Stretford, Salford Quays, and the former steelworks at Irlam, now known as Northbank. The corporation developed a strategy to develop the area, where no strategy had previously existed.

Its flagship developments included the Quay West office development at Wharfside, Trafford Park Village, Northbank Industrial Park and Hadfield Street, as well as the Trafford Centre at Dumplington. Wharfside included 200 acres (81 ha) of land at the eastern end of the Trafford Park as well as part of the ship canal docks and the area around Manchester United F.C.'s Old Trafford football ground to the east of the Bridgewater Canal. The corporation revived the Trafford Park area after a period of decline and loss of employment from the mid-1960s. It also achieved significant physical transformation of the area in the late 1980s and early 1990s.

In December 1994, Queen Elizabeth II visited the area to see the progress and, accompanied by the chairman of the corporation, she opened the new lift bridge over the Manchester Ship Canal, which had been funded by the corporation.

During its lifetime 8,300,000 square feet (770,000 m^{2}) of non-housing development and 461 housing units were built. Around 25,618 new jobs were created and some £1,560 million of private finance was leveraged in. About 497 acres (2.01 km^{2}) of derelict land was reclaimed and 27 miles (43 km) of new road and footpaths put in place. The chairman was Bill Morgan and the chief executive was Mike Shields. The life of the corporation was intended to end on 31 March 1997, but was extended until 31 March 1998, when the responsibility for Trafford Park's development passed to Trafford Council.
