= Imperial War Museum tram stop =

Manchester Metrolink tram stop

Imperial War Museum
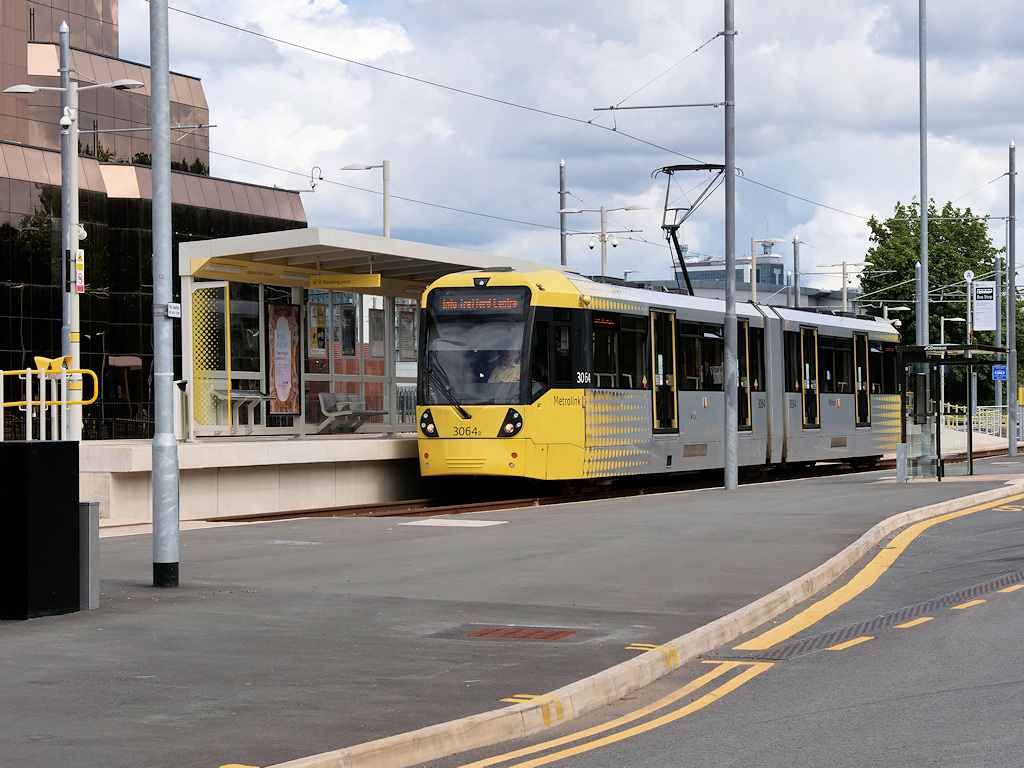
- A tram at Imperial War Museum in 2020, shortly after the line's opening

General information
- Location: Trafford Park, Trafford; England
- Coordinates: 53.46864°N 2.29682°W
- System: Metrolink station
- Line: Trafford Park Line
- Platforms: 2

Other information
- Status: In operation
- Fare zone: 2

History
- Opened: 22 March 2020

Passengers
- 2020/21: 63,500
- 2021/22: ▲0.270 million
Route map
Location

Imperial War Museum is a Manchester Metrolink tram stop in Trafford Park, Trafford. It is on the Trafford Park Line and is in fare zone 2. This stop was opened on 22 March 2020 and has step-free access.

The stop is located at street-level. It is on the south side of the Manchester Ship Canal in Trafford. It serves Imperial War Museum North, and is near to other parts of Salford Quays like The Lowry (though there is a different tram stop serving it closer). It is one of eight Metrolink stops serving the Salford Quays area.

== History ==
=== Pre-opening ===
Some of the tram tracks around Imperial War Museum run very close to the alignments of the now derelict Trafford Park Railway.

In 2013, the GMCA and the Greater Manchester Local Enterprise Partnership announced that it may fund the construction of the Trafford Park Line as far as The Trafford Centre, estimating that the line could be open to passengers by 2018/19, subject to a satisfactory business case, Transport and Works Act Order and public consultation.

During planning stages, ITV who produce Coronation Street stated concerns about the proximity of the planned route due to it being located within 50m of parts of the open air set. Eventually, it was decided that trams would run past the set after all.

New bus stops were also constructed to serve the tram stop.

=== Opening ===
The first trams (3040 and 3014 coupled together) passed by Imperial War Museum in the early hours of 10 November 2019 while on test. The stop opened to passengers on 22 March 2020, and the first passenger service tram (3073) stopped at Imperial War Museum just after 06:39.

== Layout ==
Imperial War Museum does serve IWM North, but also serves MediaCityUK and ITV Studios across a footbridge over the Manchester Ship Canal. This also allows for an out-of-station interchange with MediaCityUK tram stop.

Imperial War Museum tram stop consists of two platforms (island platform). Two dot matrix passenger information displays stand serving one platform each, and show estimated arrival times for trams in minutes up to 30 minutes prior (up to three at a time) and number of carriages.

This stop has step-free access.

Also, a new bus stop was constructed to serve the tram stop with services towards Manchester, and the bus stop on the other side of the road with services away from Manchester was moved closer to the tram stop from its original location and given a canopy.

== Services ==
Services run every 12 minutes on all routes. Some routes (not shown here) only run during peak times.

From this stop, services run to Castlefield in Manchester city centre in one direction and to The Trafford Centre in the other. MediaCityUK tram stop is a 5-10 minute walk away from here, forming an out-of-station interchange.

| Preceding station | Manchester Metrolink | Following station |
|---|---|---|
| Village towards The Trafford Centre | The Trafford Centre–Deansgate | Wharfside towards Deansgate-Castlefield |

== Transport connections ==
=== Bus ===
Imperial War Museum tram stop is served closest by bus route X50 (Worsley–Piccadilly Gardens) and 250 on Wharfside Way (The Trafford Centre–Piccadilly Gardens). Further away over the Manchester Ship Canal footbridge, bus routes 29, 53, and 79 serve The Lowry.

=== Train ===
This tram stop is not connected to any railway stations, but the nearest one is Trafford Park, approximately 1.5 miles away walking.
