= Port Salford tram stop =

Proposed tram stop in Salford

Coordinates: 53.470°N 2.389°W

Port Salford

General information
- Location: Barton-upon-Irwell, Salford; England
- System: Metrolink station
- Line: Trafford Park Line

Other information
- Status: Proposed station
Route map
Location

Port Salford is a proposed tram stop for Greater Manchester's Metrolink light rail system, which if established will serve passengers boarding and alighting at Port Salford.

The line has so far been constructed as far as The Trafford Centre but this stop is not yet a committed scheme.

Preceding station	Manchester Metrolink	Following station
Proposed
Terminus	Trafford Centre Line (planned)	Salford Reds towards Crumpsall
