= Humphrey Park railway station =

Railway station in Greater Manchester, England

Humphrey Park
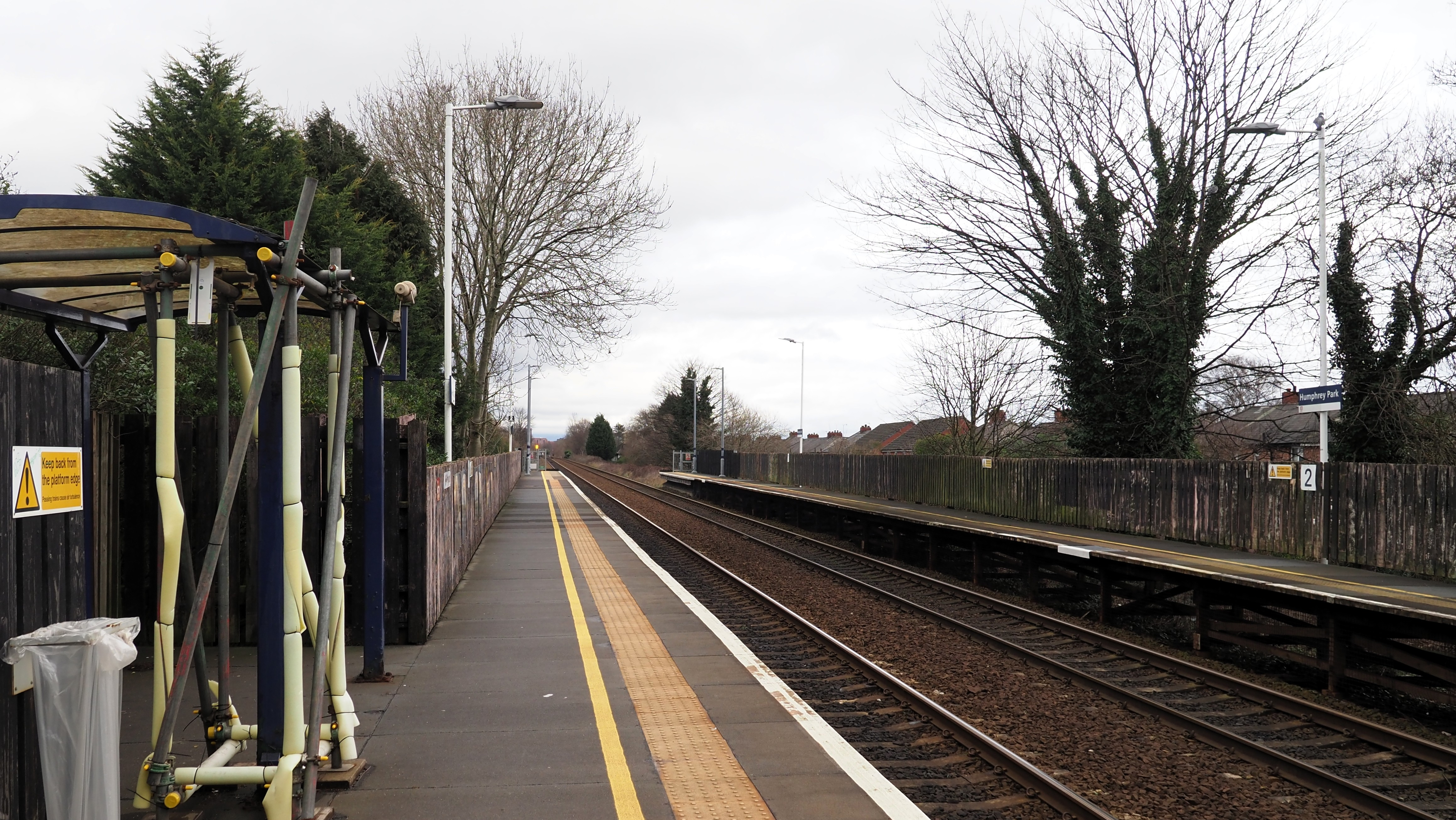
- Humphrey Park station pictured in 2026

General information
- Location: Stretford, Trafford; England
- Coordinates: 53.4523°N 2.327°W
- Grid reference: SJ783951
- Manager: Northern Trains
- Platforms: 2

Other information
- Station code: HUP
- Classification: DfT category F2

History
- Original company: London Midland Region of British Railways

Key dates
- 15 October 1984: Station opened

Passengers
- 2021/22: ▲15,544
- 2022/23: ▲19,214
- 2023/24: ▲22,822
- 2024/25: ▲30,068
- 2025/26: ▲34,086
Location
Notes
- Passenger statistics from the Office of Rail and Road

Humphrey Park railway station is in the Trafford metropolitan borough of Greater Manchester in the north west of England. The station, opened on 15 October 1984 by British Rail as an experimental station, is 4 1/4 miles (6.8 km) west of Manchester Oxford Road station on the Manchester-Liverpool Line. The station and all services calling there are operated by Northern Trains.

== Facilities ==
The station has no station building, no ticket machines and is unstaffed. There are CCTV cameras operating here. Each platform has waiting shelters, with seating available on only one side (towards Liverpool). Step-free access is available to both platforms via ramps from the road below. Train running information can be obtained from timetable posters and by phone. The station is undergoing a community regeneration, planters of herbs and seasonal vegetables are scheduled for 2025, along with a rhubarb themed mural, linking in with the regeneration of Stretford. The station is equipped with a defibrillator.

== Services ==
Services call every two hours in each direction, towards Urmston and Liverpool Lime Street to the west and towards Trafford Park and Manchester Oxford Road in the east in off-peaks. Services increase to half-hourly during peak times and may stop at extra stations along the route. In the late evening services are hourly. There is no Sunday service provided.

Preceding station	National Rail	Following station
Urmston	Northern Trains; Southern Route, (Cheshire Lines); Mondays-Saturdays only	Trafford Park
