= Trafford Park =

Industrial estate in Greater Manchester, England

Coordinates: 53°28′12″N 2°19′30″W

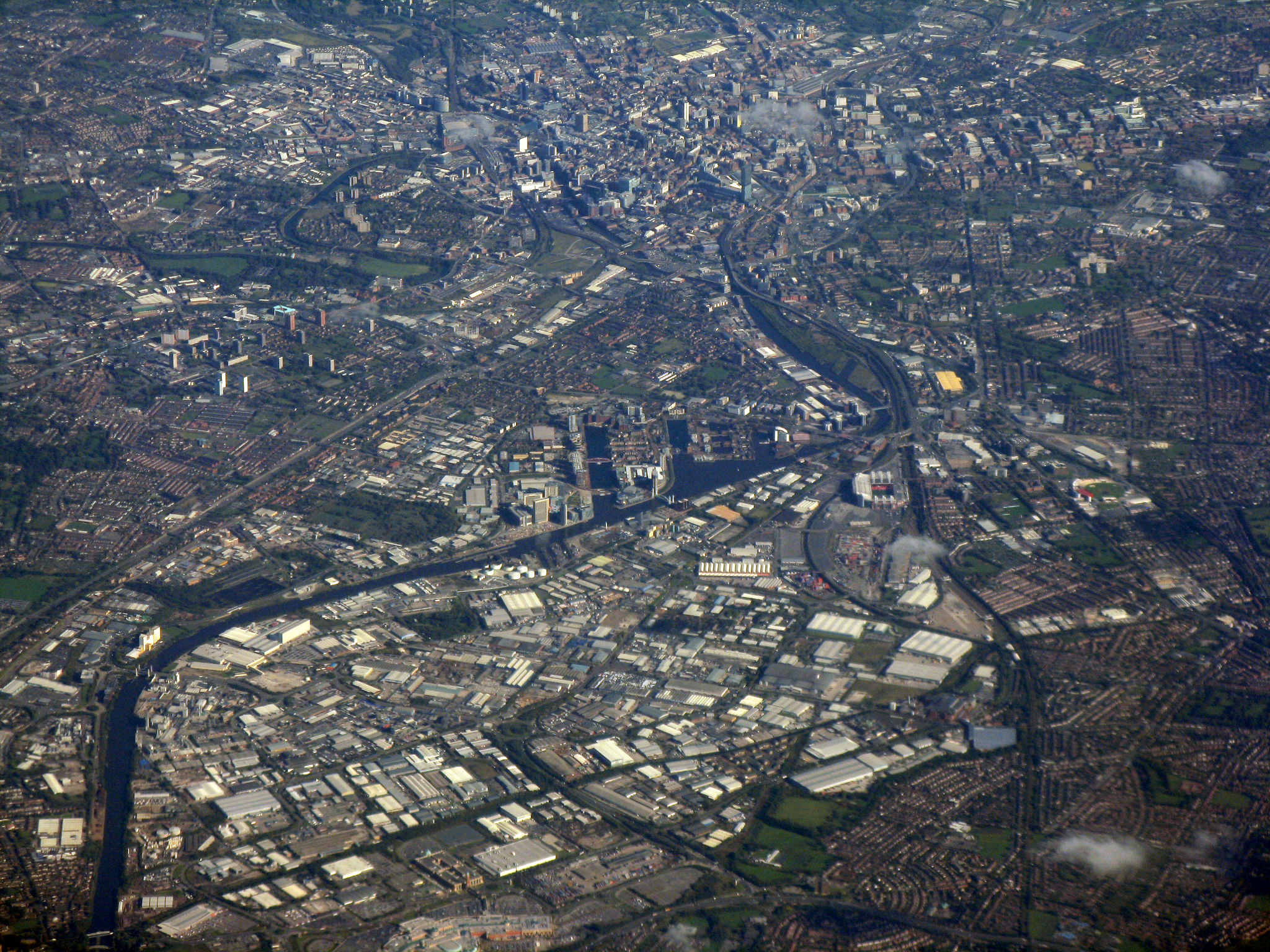
- An aerial view over Manchester city centre (top) and Trafford Park (bottom) south of the Manchester Ship Canal

- Location within Greater Manchester
- OS grid reference: SJ785965
- Metropolitan borough: Trafford
- Metropolitan county: Greater Manchester
- Region: North West
- Country: England
- Sovereign state: United Kingdom
- Post town: MANCHESTER
- Postcode district: M17
- Dialling code: 0161
- Police: Greater Manchester
- Fire: Greater Manchester
- Ambulance: North West
- UK Parliament: Stretford and Urmston

Trafford Park is an area of the metropolitan borough of Trafford, Greater Manchester, England, opposite Salford Quays on the southern side of the Manchester Ship Canal, 3.4 miles (5.5 km) southwest of Manchester city centre and 1.3 miles (2.1 km) north of Stretford. Until the late 19th century it was the ancestral home of the Trafford family, who sold it to the financier Ernest Terah Hooley in 1896. Occupying an area of 4.7 square miles (12 km^{2}), it was the first planned industrial estate in the world, and remained the largest in Europe over a century later.

Trafford Park is almost entirely surrounded by water; the Bridgewater Canal forms its southeastern and southwestern boundaries, and the Manchester Ship Canal, which opened in 1894, its northeastern and northwestern boundaries. Hooley's plan was to develop the Ship Canal frontage, but the canal was slow to generate the predicted volume of traffic, so in the early days the park was largely used for leisure activities such as golf, polo and boating. British Westinghouse was the first major company to move in, and by 1903 it was employing about half of the 12,000 workers then employed in the park, which became one of the most important engineering facilities in Britain.

Trafford Park was a major supplier of materiel in the First and Second World Wars, producing such equipment as the Rolls-Royce Merlin engines used to power the Spitfire, Hurricane, Mosquito and the Lancaster. At its peak in 1945, 75,000 workers were employed in the park. Employment began to decline in the 1960s as companies closed in favour of newer, more efficient plants elsewhere. By 1967 employment had fallen to 50,000, and the decline continued throughout the 1970s. The new generation of container ships was too large for the Manchester Ship Canal, which led to a further decline in Trafford Park's fortunes. The workforce had fallen to 15,000 by 1976, and by the 1980s industry had almost disappeared from the park.

The Trafford Park Urban Development Corporation, formed in 1987, reversed the estate's decline. In the 11 years of its existence the park attracted 1,000 companies, generating 28,299 new jobs and £1.759 billion of private-sector investment. As of 2025 there are 1,400 companies within the park, employing 40,000 people.

== History ==
=== Pre-industrial ===
Until the industrial development of the park began in the late 19th century, much of the area now known as Trafford Park was a "beautifully timbered deer park". Its 1,183 acres (479 ha) had flat meadows and grassland, and an inner park containing a tree-lined avenue leading from an entrance lodge at Barton-upon-Irwell. It was the ancestral estate of the de Trafford family, one of the most ancient in England, and at that time, one of the largest landowners in Stretford. The family acquired the lands around Trafford in about 1200, when Richard de Trafford was given the lordship of Stretford by Hamon de Massey, 4th Baron of Dunham. Some time between 1672 and 1720, the de Traffords moved from the home they had occupied since 1017, in what is now known as Old Trafford, to what was then called Whittleswick Hall, which they renamed Trafford Hall. Trafford Park contained the hall, its grounds, and three farms: Park Farm, Moss Farm, and Waters Meeting Farm.

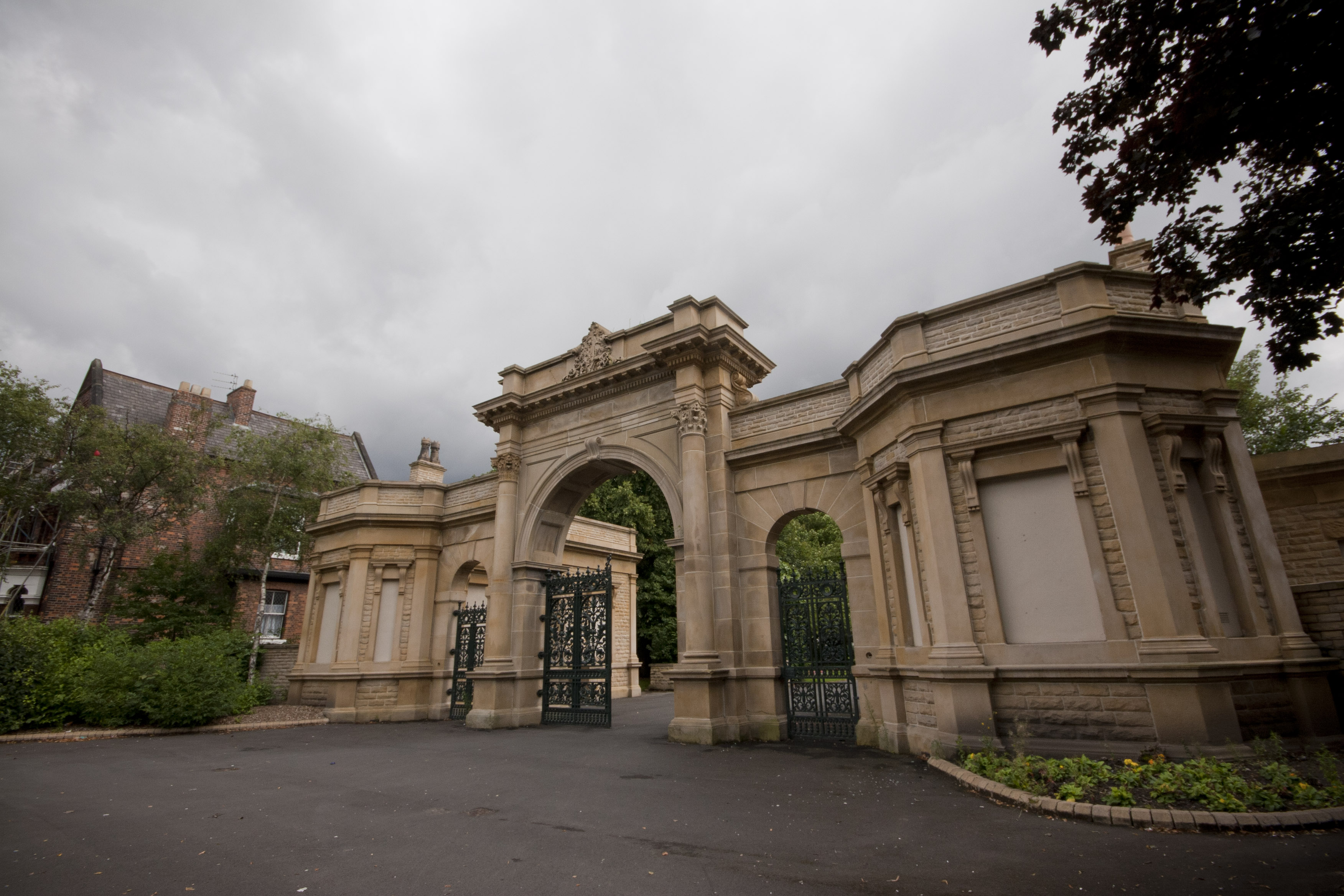
The Old Trafford entrance lodge and gates to Trafford Park were moved to their present site at the entrance to Gorse Hill Park in 1922.

In 1761 a section of the Bridgewater Canal was built along the southeast and southwest sides of Trafford Park. The canal and the River Irwell, which marked the estate's northeast and northwest boundaries, gave the park its present-day "island-like" quality.

A meeting held in 1882 at the Didsbury home of the engineer Daniel Adamson began the estate's transformation, with the creation of the Manchester Ship Canal committee. Sir Humphrey de Trafford implacably opposed the canal, objecting that it would bring polluted water close to his residence, interfere with his drainage, and render Trafford Hall uninhabitable. The Ship Canal Bill nevertheless became law on 6 August 1885, and construction began in 1888. A 9-foot-tall (2.7 m) wall was built between the park and the canal to block it off from view and two wharves were built for the exclusive use of the de Traffords.

The opening of the ship canal in 1894 made Trafford Park a prime site for industrial development. During the following century, the park was built over with factories and housing for workers. The deer were initially allowed to continue roaming free, but as the park's industrialisation gathered pace they were considered inappropriate and were killed, the last of them in 1900. Trafford Hall survived until its demolition following the Second World War.

=== Early development ===
On 7 May 1896 Sir Humphrey Francis de Trafford put the 1,183-acre (479 ha) estate up for auction, but it failed to reach its reported reserve price of £300,000 (£34.5 million as at 2025). (Note: Comparing relative purchasing power of £300,000 in 1896 with 2023.) There was public debate before and after the abortive sale as to whether Manchester Corporation should buy Trafford Park, but the corporation could not agree to terms quickly enough. On 23 June Ernest Terah Hooley bought Trafford Park for £360,000 (£41.4 million as at 2023). (Note: Comparing relative purchasing power of £360,000 in 1896 with 2023.)

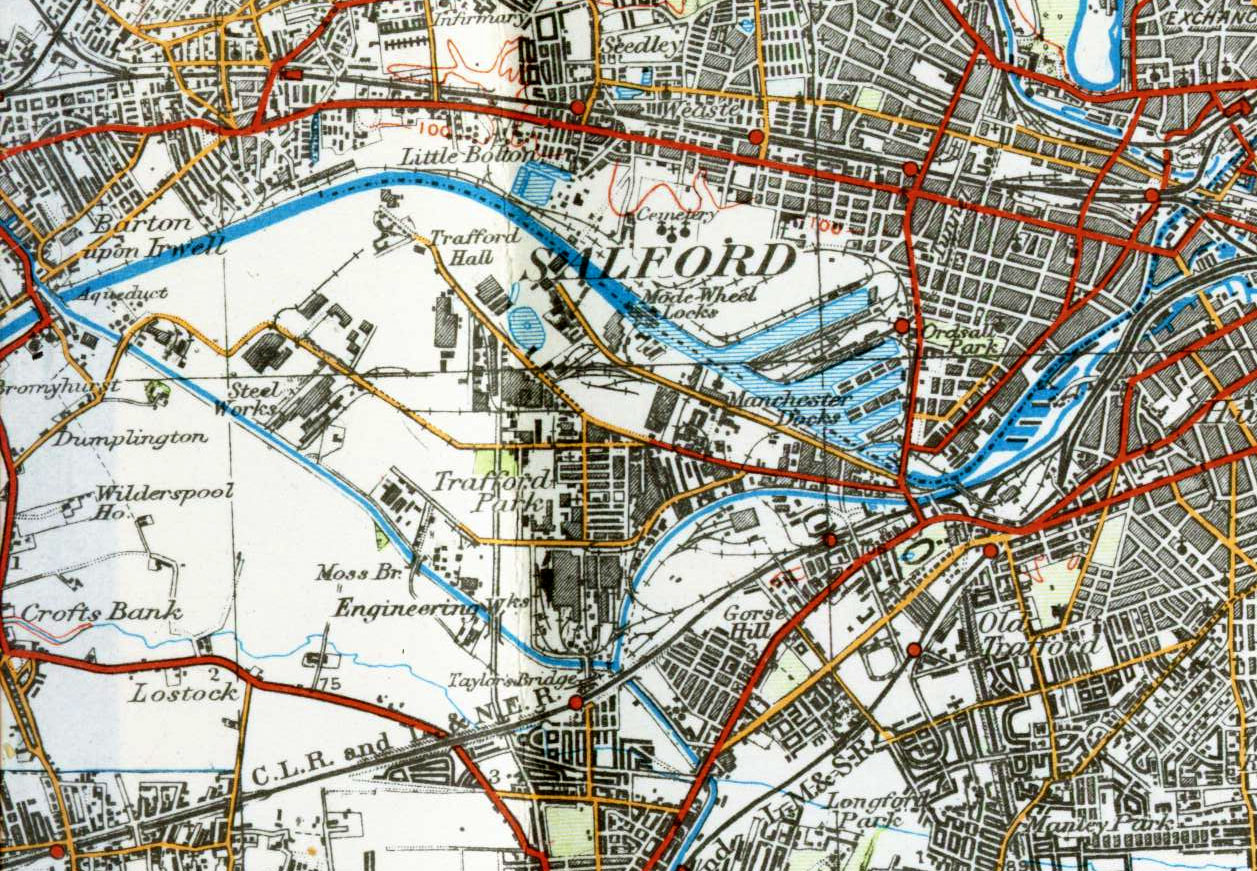
1924 map showing Trafford Park almost entirely enclosed by the Manchester Ship Canal and the Bridgewater Canal

On 17 August Hooley formed Trafford Park Estates Ltd, transferring his ownership of the park to the new company – of which he was the chairman and a significant shareholder – at a substantial profit. The initial plans for the estate included a racetrack, housing and a cycle works, along with the development of the ship canal frontage for various types of trade. By that time the ship canal had been open for two years, but the predicted traffic had yet to materialise. Hooley met with Marshall Stevens, the general manager of the Ship Canal Company, and both men recognised the benefit that the industrial development of Trafford Park could offer to the ship canal, and the ship canal to the estate. In January 1897 Stevens became the managing director of Trafford Park Estates. He remained with the company, latterly as its joint chairman and managing director, until 1930.

The company did not initially construct buildings for letting, and instead leased land for development. By the end of June 1897 less than one per cent of the park had been leased, and so the park's existing assets were put to use until more tenants could be found. Trafford Hall was opened as a hotel in 1899, to serve prospective industrialists considering a move to the park, along with their key employees. It had 40 bedrooms, available to "gentlemen only". The hall's stables and some other outbuildings were used for stock auctions and the sale of horses, from 1900 to 1902, and the ornamental lake was leased to William Crooke and Sons for use as a boating lake, initially on a five-year lease. A polo ground was set up in the park in 1902, and 80 acres (32 ha) of land near the hall were leased to the Manchester Golf Club, which laid out a three-mile (4.8 km) long course. The club moved from Trafford Park to a new site at Hopwood Park in 1912.

In 1908 the Estates Company reversed its earlier policy of only leasing the land, and began to construct what were known as "Hives", 25-foot-wide (7.6 m) subdivisions of a long building that could be internally reconfigured for each tenant's needs. Nineteen were built initially, available to rent at £80 per annum (£8,000 as of 2025). Brooke Bond was one of the companies to use the Hives, before moving to its purpose-built factory on the park in 1922. The Estates Company also built large reinforced concrete warehouses, known as "Safes". These were fitted with sprinkler systems and were considered fireproof, which reduced insurance costs to 25 per cent of those of comparable warehouses elsewhere in the area. Each Safe had a capacity of 778,000 cubic feet (22,000 m^{3}), enough to hold 50,000 bales of cotton.

=== Industrialisation ===
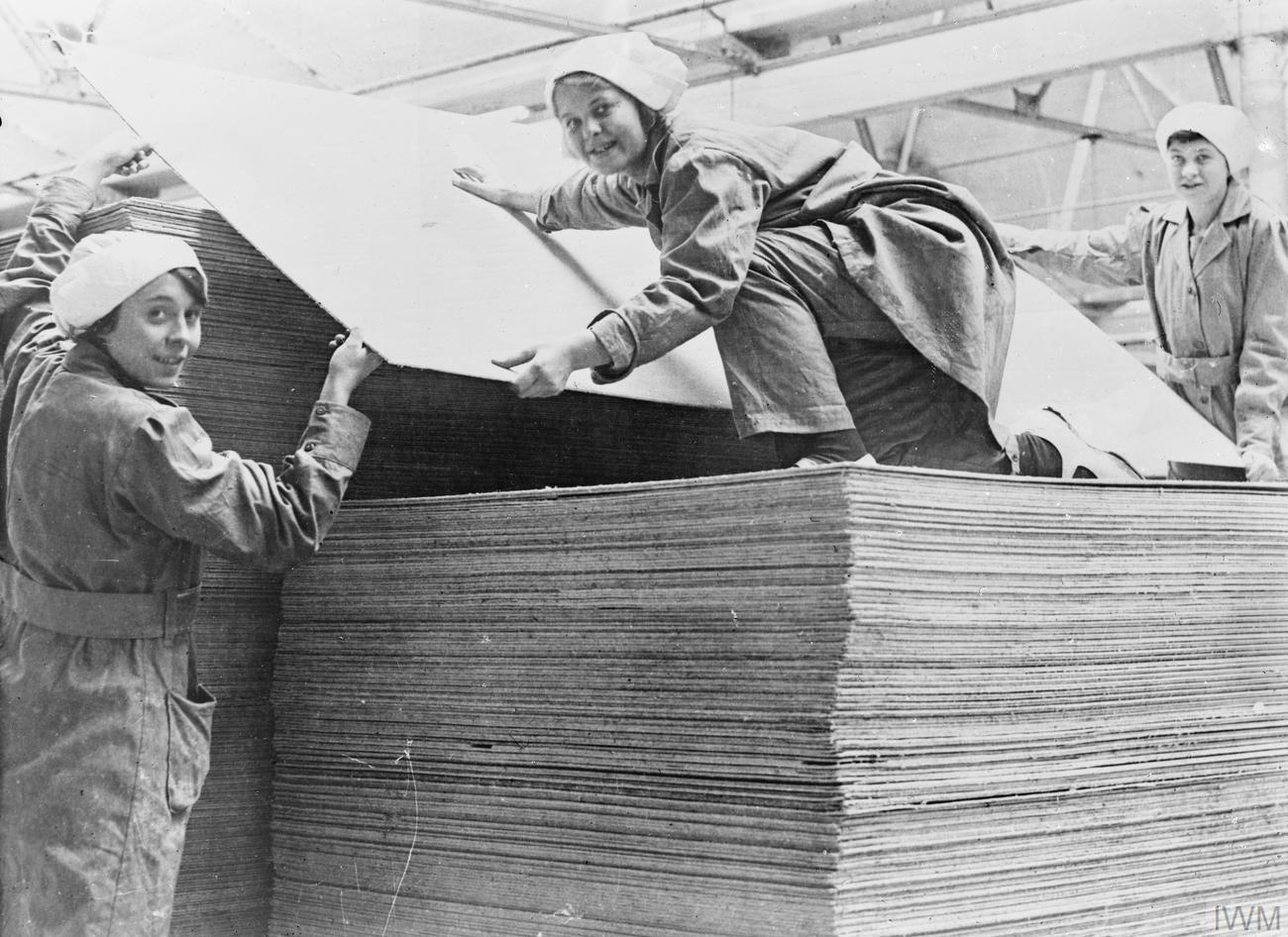
Workers stacking asbestos sheets at the Turner Bros. Asbestos Factory, Trafford Park, September 1918

Among the first industries to arrive was the Manchester Patent Fuel Company, in 1898. The Trafford Brick Company arrived soon after, followed by J.W. Southern & Co. (timber merchants), James Gresham (engineers), and W. T. Glovers & Co. (electric cable manufacturers). Glovers also built a power station in the park, on the banks of the Bridgewater Canal. Most of these early developments were built on the eastern side of the park, while the rest of it remained largely undeveloped.

The first American company to arrive was Westinghouse Electric, which formed its British subsidiary – British Westinghouse Electric Company – in 1899, and purchased 130 acres (0.53 km^{2}) on two sites. Building work started in 1900, and the factory began production of turbines and electric generators in 1902. By the following year, British Westinghouse was employing about half of the 12,000 workers in Trafford Park. Its main machine shop was 899 feet (274 m) long and 440 feet (134 m) wide; for almost 100 years Westinghouse's Trafford Park works was the most important engineering facility in Britain. In 1919 Westinghouse was sold to the Vickers Company and renamed Metropolitan-Vickers, often shortened to Metrovicks.

In 1903 the Cooperative Wholesale Society (CWS), bought land at Trafford Wharf and set up a large food-packing factory and a flour mill. Other companies arriving at about the same time included Kilverts (lard renderers), the Liverpool Warehousing Company, and Lancashire Dynamo & Crypto Ltd.

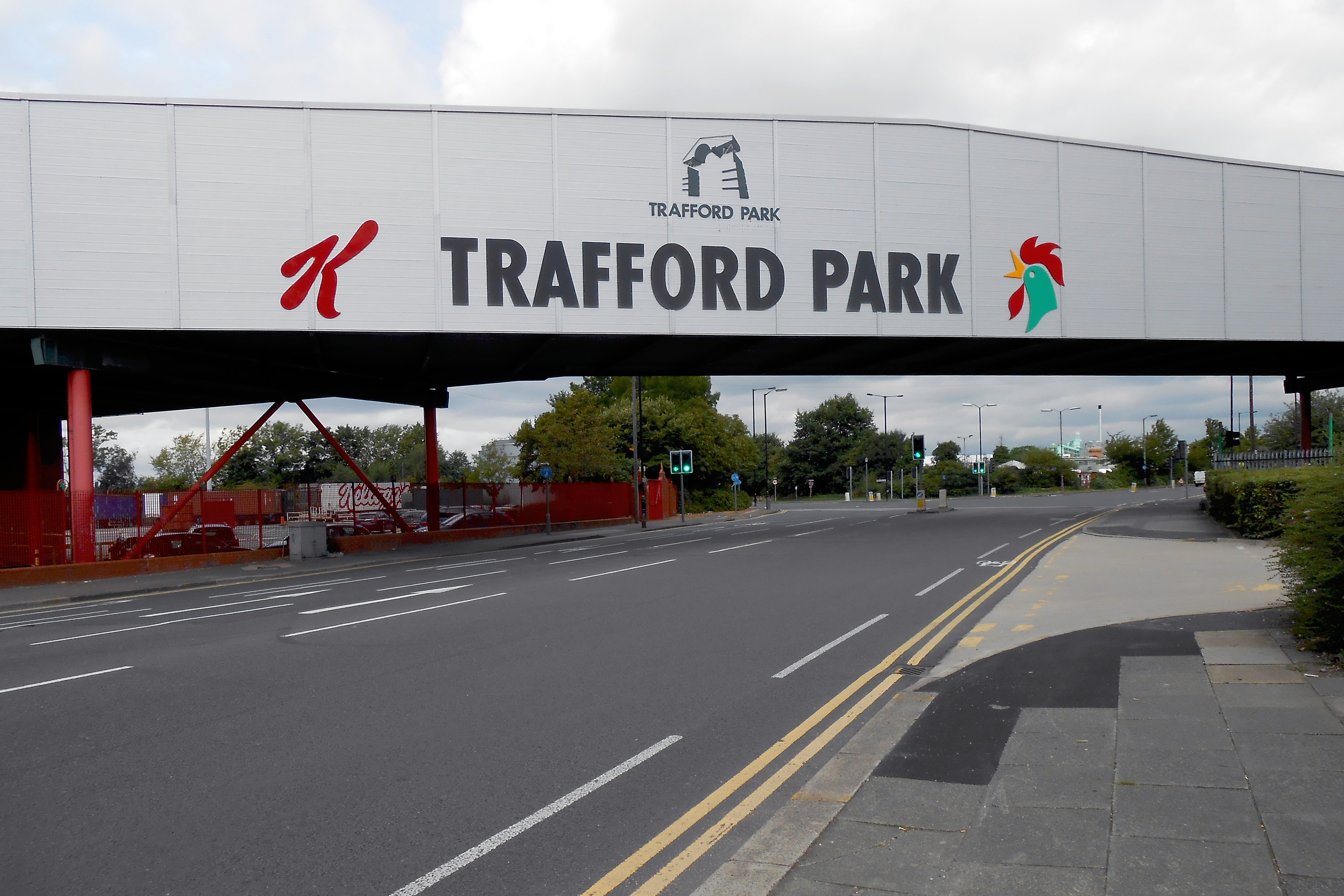
Trafford Park's southern entrance is marked by this bridge connecting Kellogg's manufacturing plant to its warehouse. Kellogg's moved into the park during the 1930s.

The second major American company to set up a manufacturing base in Trafford Park was the Ford Motor Company, in 1911. Ford used its factory as an assembly plant for the Model T, and other vehicles were assembled there in later years before production moved to a new factory at Dagenham, Essex, in 1931. By 1915, 100 American companies had moved into the park, peaking at more than 200 by 1933. When the cotton industry began to decline in the early-20th century, Trafford Park and the Manchester Ship Canal helped Manchester – and to a lesser extent the rest of south Lancashire – to mitigate the economic depression that the rest of Lancashire suffered. During the First World War the park was used for the manufacture of munitions, chemicals and other materiel. Most firms at Trafford Park succeeded in avoiding bankruptcy during the Great Depression, unlike the rest of Lancashire. Ford moved to Dagenham in 1931, but returned temporarily to Trafford Park during the Second World War.

Following the lead of its American counterpart, Metropolitan Vickers set up Manchester's and one of the UK's first radio stations at their factory in 1921. Its first broadcast took place on 17 May 1922. That October the company was one of six which formed the British Broadcasting Company (BBC), which started broadcasting from the Metrovicks studio under the call sign 2ZY on 15 November 1922. Much of the station's content was musical, but news, plays, and children's programmes were also transmitted. Conditions in the 30-by-16-foot (9.1 m × 4.9 m) studio were cramped, and the BBC moved the station to larger premises outside the park in 1923.

=== Westwards expansion ===
Sir Humphrey de Trafford had retained 1,300 acres (530 ha) of land on the western side of the ship canal after his 1897 sale of Trafford Park. As the industrialisation of the park neared its completion the Estates Company acquired parcels of the remaining de Trafford land, then in the control of family trustees, as did the Canal Company. In 1924 the Estates Company bought a half share in Dumplington Estates Ltd., a company set up to administer 38 acres (15 ha) of land bought from the de Trafford Trustees to build a garden village. In 1929 the Ship Canal Company acquired Dumplington Estates, giving the Estates Company land to the south of Barton, the Trafford Park Extension. The Canal Company recognised the potential for a new dock on the land and named it Barton Dock Estate, although no dock was ever built. The Barton Docks area was developed during and after the Second World War, but the land belonging to Dumplington Estates remained largely undeveloped until the construction of the Trafford Centre, which opened in 1998.

=== Second World War ===
Trafford Park largely produced war materiel during the Second World War, such as the Avro Manchester and Avro Lancaster bombers, and the Rolls-Royce Merlin engines used to power the Spitfire, Hurricane, Mosquito and the Lancaster. The engines were made by Ford under licence. The 17,316 workers employed in Ford's purpose-built factory produced 34,000 engines during the war. The facility was designed in two separate sections to minimise the impact of bomb damage on production. The wood-working factory of F. Hills & Sons built more than 800 Percival Proctor aircraft for the RAF between 1940 and 1945, which were flight-tested at the Barton Aerodrome. Other companies produced gun bearings, steel tracks for Churchill tanks, munitions, Bailey bridges, and much else. ICI built and operated the first facility in the UK able to produce penicillin in quantity.

Trafford Park was frequently bombed by the Luftwaffe, particularly during the Manchester Blitz of December 1940. On the night of 23 December 1940, the Metropolitan-Vickers aircraft factory in Mosley Road was badly damaged, with the loss of the first 13 MV-built Avro Manchester bombers in their final assembly. The new Ford factory producing aircraft engines was bombed a few days after its opening in May 1941. Trafford Hall was severely damaged by bombing, and was demolished shortly after the war.

In the December 1940 air raids, stray bombs aimed for Trafford Park landed on the nearby Old Trafford football stadium, home of Manchester United, resulting in minor damage; matches were soon being played at the stadium again. On 11 March 1941, stray bombs fell onto Old Trafford again, causing serious damage to the stadium. It was comprehensively rebuilt after the war and re-opened in 1949, until which time Manchester United played their home games at Maine Road, home of Manchester City in Moss Side.

At the outbreak of war in 1939 there were an estimated 50,000 people employed at Trafford Park. By the end of the war in 1945 that number had risen to 75,000, probably the peak size of the park's workforce; Metropolitan-Vickers alone employed 26,000.

=== Decline and regeneration ===
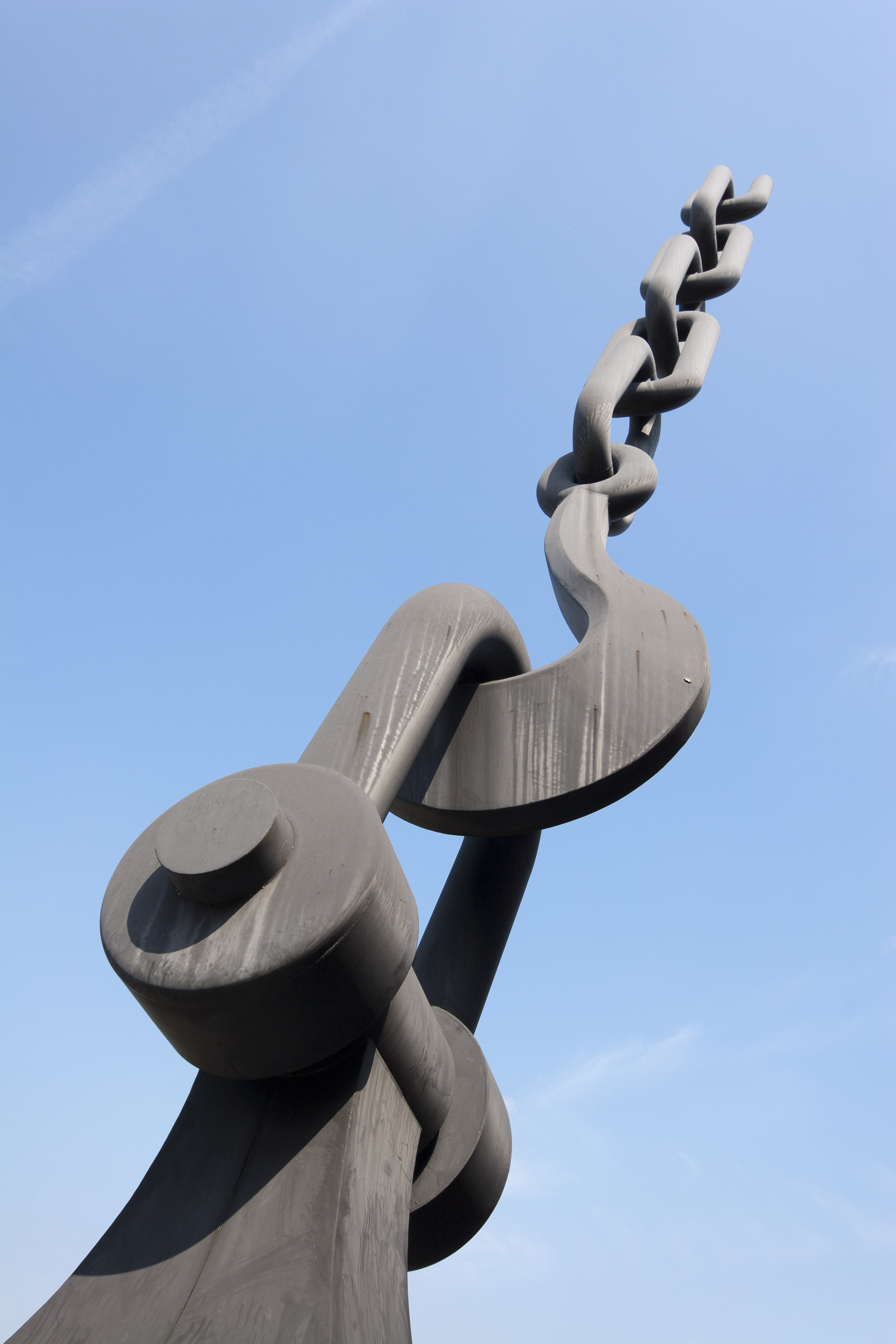
One of a pair of 56-foot-tall (17 m) sculptures named Skyhooks, at the eastern end of the park. They were designed by Brian Fell and installed in 1995, as part of the estate's regeneration.

In the 1960s employment in the park began to decline as companies closed their premises in favour of newer, more efficient plants elsewhere. Ellesmere Port and Runcorn at the western end of the Manchester Ship Canal overtook Trafford Park in economic importance. In 1967 employment had fallen to 50,000 and there was a further decline in the 1970s. In 1971 Stretford Council responded by setting up the Trafford Park Industrial Council (TRAFIC), membership of which was open to any firm in Trafford Park. One of TRAFIC's early initiatives was to encourage businesses in the park to address the general air of decay by improving their own areas through landscaping and other environmental improvements. The park's decline was exacerbated by the decreasing use of the Manchester Ship Canal during the 1970s, which was unable to accommodate the newer, larger container ships entering service. By 1976 the workforce had fallen to 15,000, and by the 1980s industry had virtually disappeared.

On 12 August 1981, 483 acres (1.95 km^{2}) of Trafford Park – along with Salford Quays – were declared an Enterprise Zone by the UK government in an attempt to encourage new development within the estate. The new status did little to reverse the park's fortunes; the target had been to create 7,000 new jobs over 10 years, but by 1986 only 2,557 had been created, not enough to compensate for the job losses caused by closures within the park. On 10 February 1987 the Trafford Park Development Corporation was formed to assume responsibility for a 3,130 acres (12.7 km^{2}) Urban Development Area that included Trafford Park and also parts of Stretford, Salford Quays, and the former steelworks at Irlam, now known as Northbank. Wharfside, one of four redevelopment schemes undertaken by the corporation, included 200 acres (81 ha) of the eastern end of the park as well as part of the ship canal docks and the area around Manchester United F.C.'s Old Trafford ground to the east of the Bridgewater Canal. The intention was to build "a flagship site" containing prestigious accommodation for offices, shops, and hi-tech industries, capitalising on the area's proximity to Manchester city centre and mirroring the earlier success of the redevelopment at nearby Salford Quays.

Between 1987 and 1998 the development corporation attracted 1,000 companies, generating 28,299 new jobs and £1.759 billion of private sector investment. The setting up of the corporation was intended to end on 31 March 1997, but was extended until March 1998, when the responsibility for Trafford Park's development passed to Trafford Council. As of 2025 there were 1,400 companies within the park employing 40,000 people, making it one of the largest in Europe. On 24 April 2026, a major fire broke out.

== Governance ==
=== Civic history ===
The eastern area of the park, where the first developments took place at the end of the 19th century, was then under the local government control of Stretford Urban District; the west was controlled by the urban district of Barton-upon-Irwell. Tensions soon began to emerge between the Estates Company and Stretford Council over the provision of local services and infrastructure. In 1902 W. T. Glover & Co, a cable manufacturing company that had moved to the park from nearby Salford, built a power station next to their works to supply electricity to the rest of the park. The Estates Company had previously approached Manchester Corporation, but Stretford would not allow another local authority to supply electricity within its area.

In 1901 Manchester Corporation formally proposed a merger with Stretford UDC, on the basis that Stretford's growth was due in large part to Trafford Park, the growth of which in turn was largely due to the Manchester Ship Canal. Manchester Corporation had provided one-third of the capital needed to build the ship canal, for which it had doubled its municipal debt, despite having also increased rates by 26 per cent between 1892 and 1895. Stretford and Lancashire County Council opposed the merger, which was rejected following a government inquiry.

The tensions between Stretford and the Estates Company began to come to a head in 1906, when in response to complaints in the press about the state of a road in the park, Trafford Park Road, Stretford issued formal notices demanding that all premises with frontage onto the road pay for its improvement. Further disputes over the standard of roads in the park followed until, in 1907, the Estates Company presented a petition to Lancashire County Council demanding that Trafford Park be an urban district in its own right, independent of Stretford. The county council dismissed the petition, but later that year, following a petition organised by the Trafford Park Ratepayers Association, a new local government ward, Park Ward, was created within Stretford. The new ward did not include the western part of the park, which remained under the control of Barton-upon-Irwell.

As a result of the Local Government Act 1972, the borough of Stretford was abolished and Trafford Park has, since 1 April 1974, formed part of the Metropolitan Borough of Trafford.

=== Political representation ===
Trafford Park is mostly in the Trafford ward of Gorse Hill & Colnbrook; a small area to the west is in the Lostock & Barton ward. The entire park is in the parliamentary constituency of Stretford and Urmston represented by Labour MP Andrew Western.

== Geography ==
The topography of Trafford Park is either flat or gently undulating, about 144 feet (44 m) above sea level at its highest point. The local bedrock is Triassic Bunter Sandstone, overlaid by sand and gravel deposited during the last ice age, around 10,000 years ago. There are some areas of peat bog in the west of the park, in the area formerly known as Trafford Moss. In 1793 William Roscoe began work on draining the bog, and by 1798 that work was advanced enough for him to turn his attention to the task of reclaiming the much larger Chat Moss in nearby Salford, also owned by the Trafford family.

The park occupies an area of 4.7 square miles (12 km^{2}), and is almost entirely surrounded by water. The Bridgewater Canal forms its southeastern and southwestern boundaries, and the Manchester Ship Canal forms its northeastern and northwestern boundaries. Trafford Park is the most northerly area of Trafford.

== Trafford Park Village ==
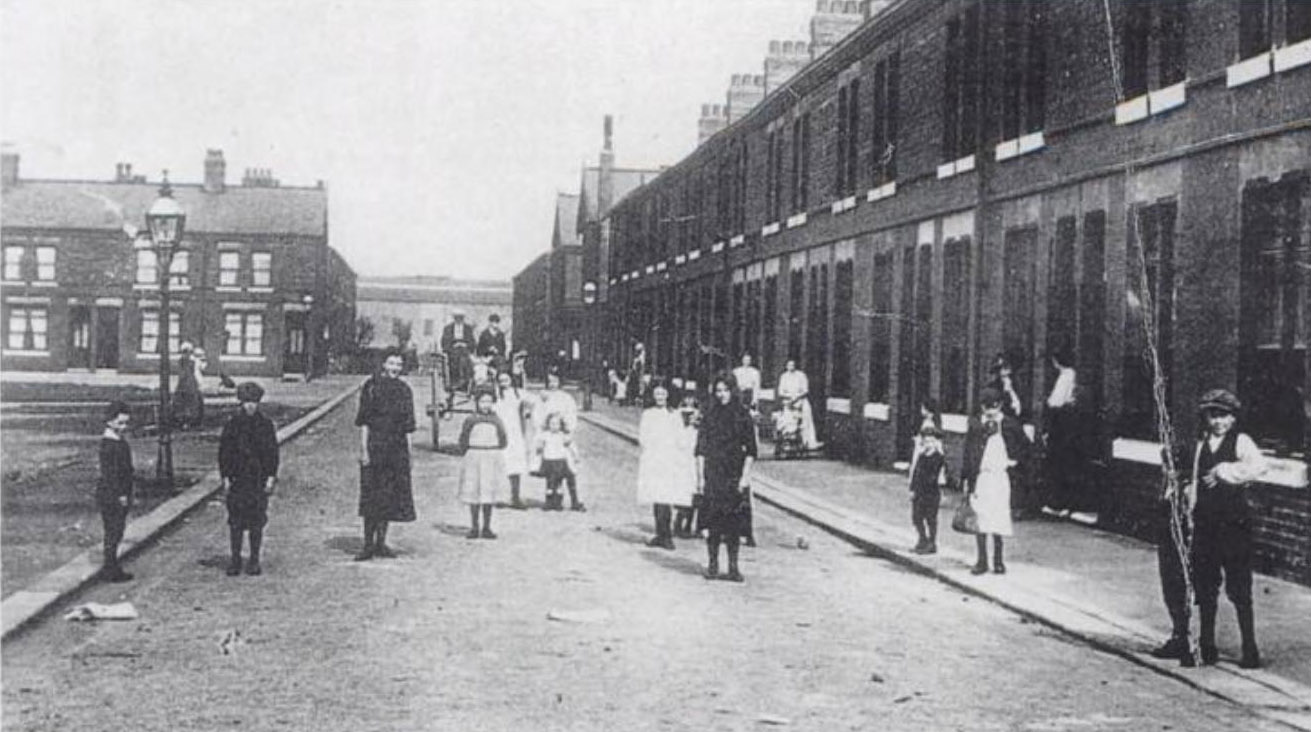
Eleventh Street, c. 1910

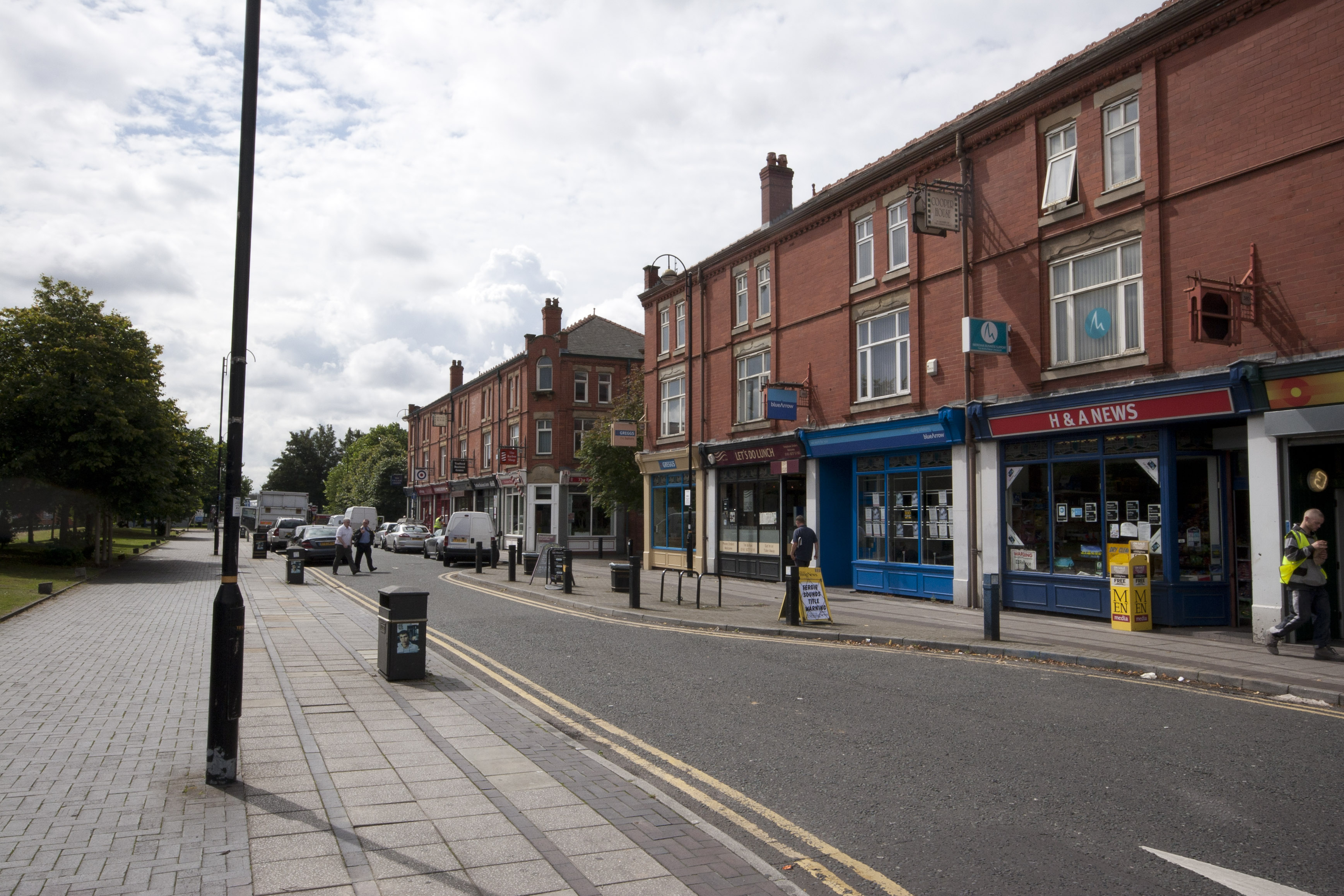
Third Avenue, 2010

In 1898 a large plot of land was sold to Edmund Nuttall & Co. for the construction of 1,200 houses. The houses were never built, but the land later became the site of Trafford Park Village, known locally as The Village. The announced arrival of the Westinghouse factory initiated development; in 1899, Trafford Park Dwellings Ltd was formed, to provide housing for the anticipated influx of new workers. Nuttall's land was acquired, and by 1903 more than 500 houses had been built, rising to over 700 when the development was completed in 1904. In 1907 it was estimated that the population of the Village was 3,060. The development was laid out in a grid pattern, with the roads numbered instead of being named. Avenues numbered 1 to 4 run north–south, streets numbered 1 to 12 run east–west.

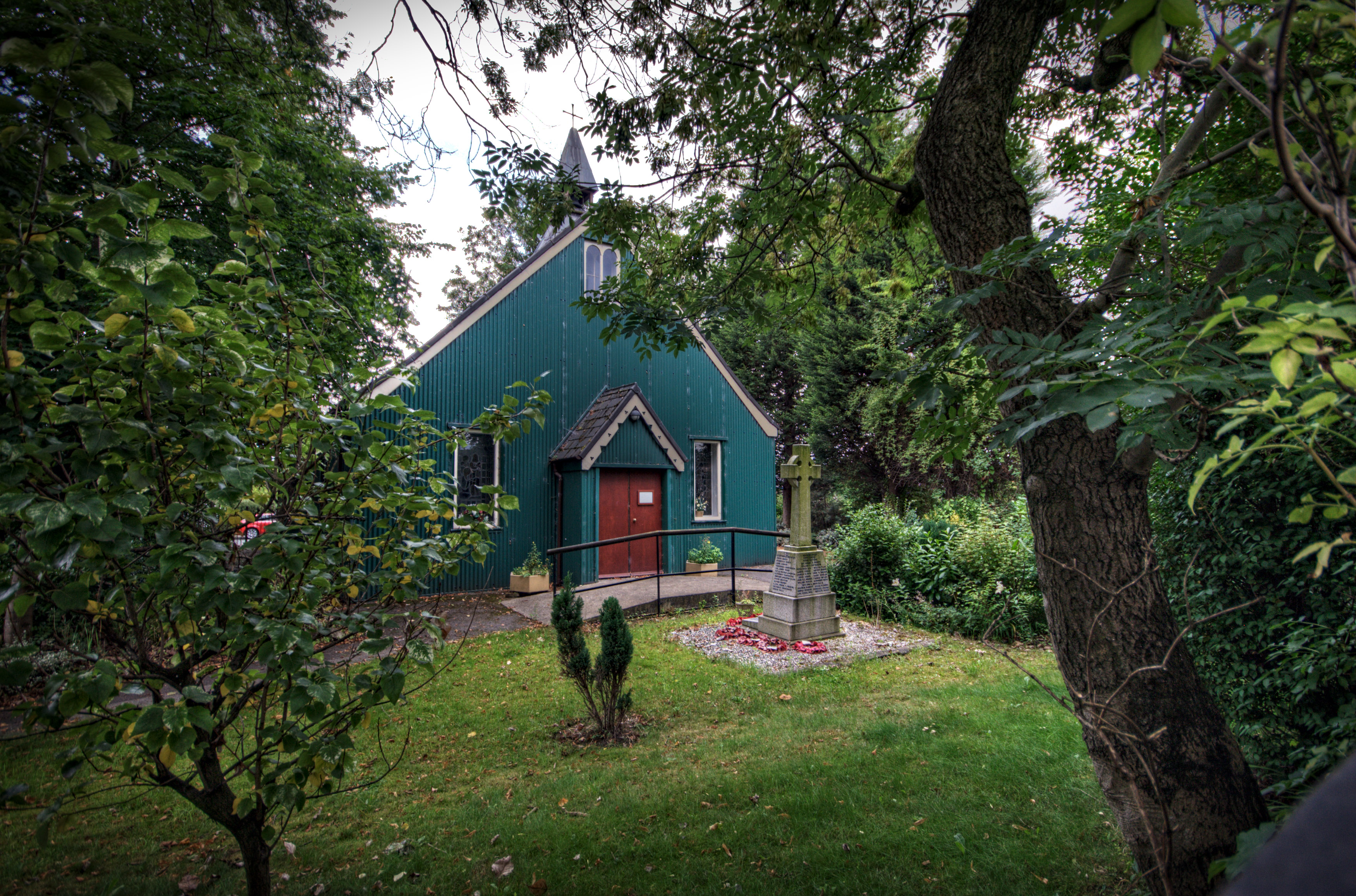
St Antony's church was built in 1904 and reclad in 1994.

The Village was almost completely self-contained, with its own shops, public hall, post office, police station, school, social club, and sports facilities. Three corrugated iron churches were built: a Methodist chapel in 1901, St Cuthbert's (Church of England) in 1902, and the Roman Catholic St Antony's in 1904. St Cuthbert's was replaced by a brick building, but closed in 1982. Only St Antony's remains open; it contains the altar and a stained glass window from the chapel at Trafford Hall, donated by Lady Annette de Trafford. The Village's design attracted criticism from the start; the streets were narrow, with few gardens, and the whole development was close to the pollution of the neighbouring industries. It resembled the terraced properties in the surrounding areas, with many condemned as slums in later years. By the 1970s The Village was considered by Stretford Council to be a slum area, unsuitable for residential housing. In the first phase of clearance, during the mid-1970s, 298 houses were demolished. In the early 1980s 325 more were demolished, leaving only the largest 84.

== Landmarks ==
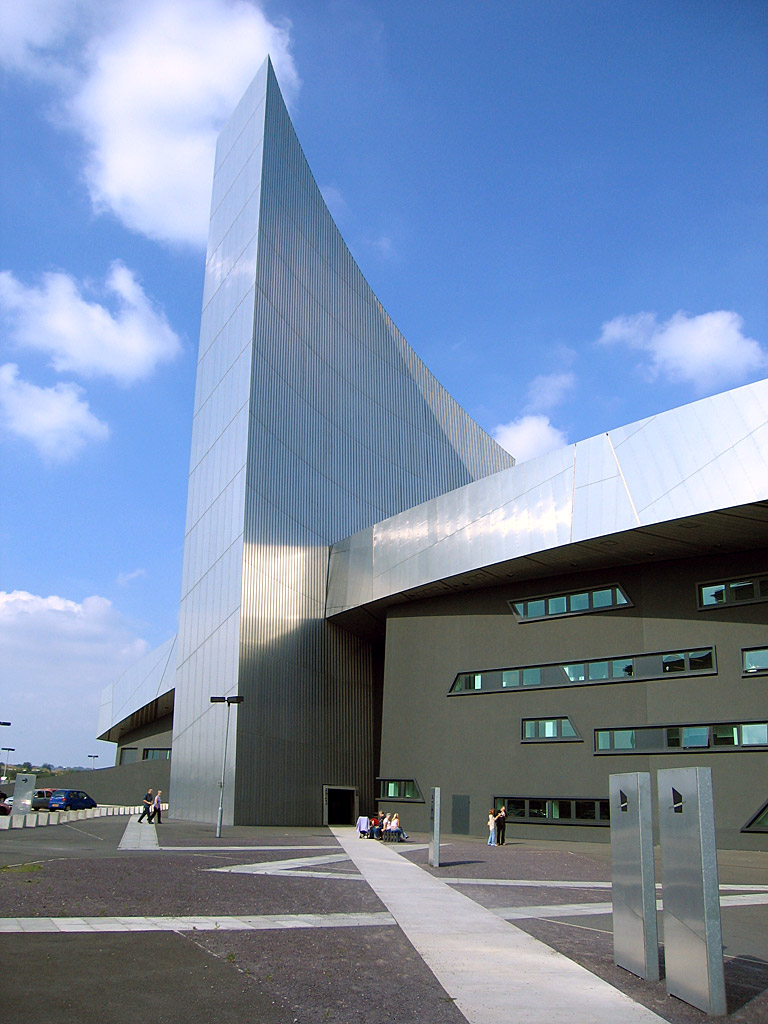
The main entrance to the Imperial War Museum North

The Imperial War Museum North, opened on 5 July 2002, is in Trafford Wharf, on the southern edge of the ship canal looking over towards Salford Quays. An example of deconstructivist architecture, it was the first building in the United Kingdom designed by Daniel Libeskind. The structure has three interlocking sections: the air shard, the earth shard, and the water shard, representing a world torn apart by conflict. Entrance to the museum is via the air shard, which is 180 feet (55 m) tall, and is open to the elements. It has a viewing platform about 95 feet (29 m) high, offering views across Salford and the Quays towards Manchester city centre. The museum houses two extensive exhibition spaces. The largest is dedicated to the permanent exhibition covering conflicts from 1900 to the present day, and the other space is used for special exhibitions.

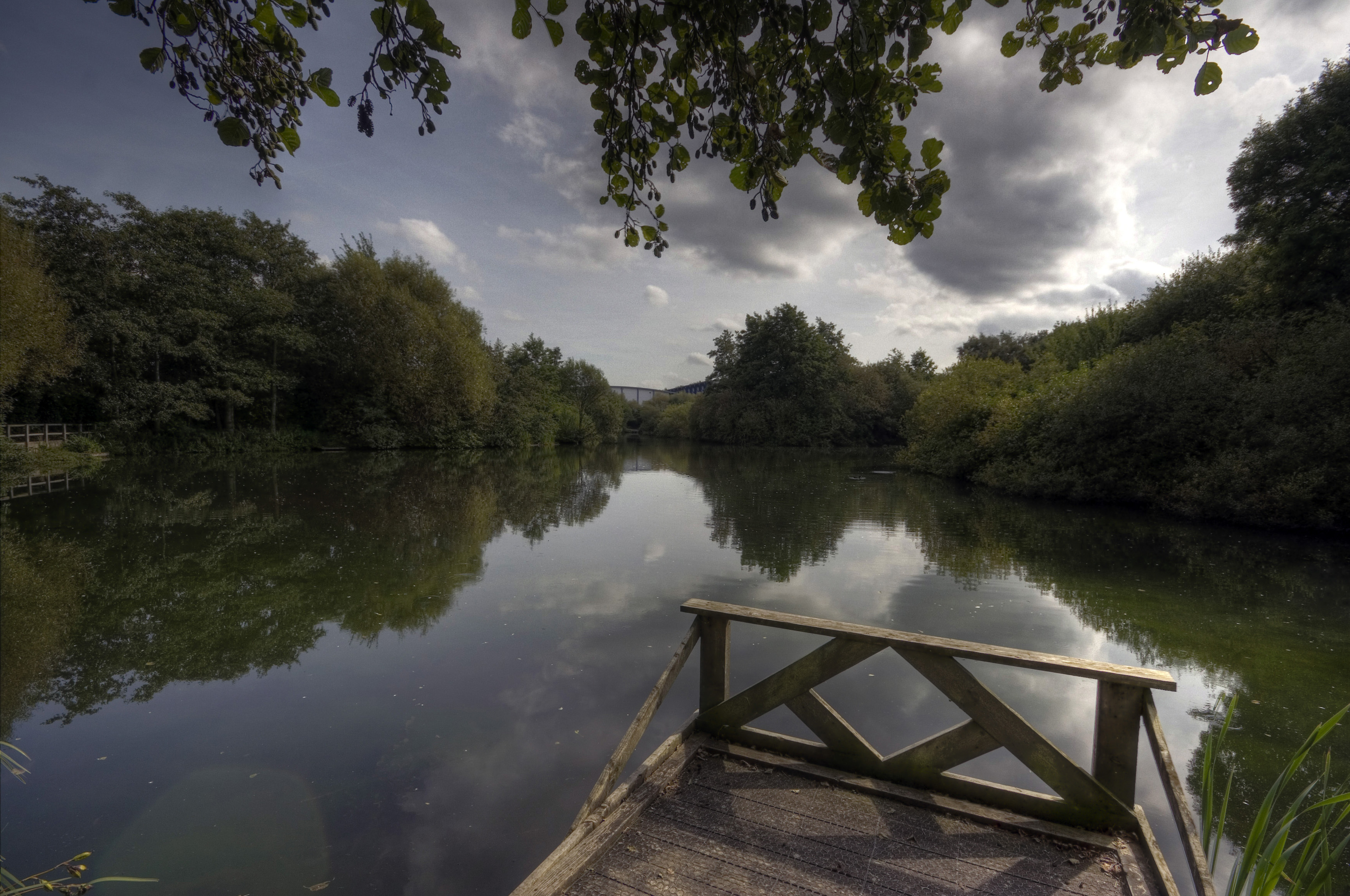
What remains of Trafford Park's boating lake, now the Trafford Ecology Park

The 11-acre (4.5 ha) Trafford Ecology Park is what remains of Trafford Park's ornamental boating lake. Boating continued on the lake until the 1930s; by then its water had become polluted by asbestos and oil seepage from the neighbouring Anglo American Oil depot. During the Second World War, the site was used as a tip for foundry waste. Esso bought the land in 1974, and levelled and partly seeded it to improve the frontage to its site. Trafford council bought the land from Esso in 1983, for £50,000 (£170,000 as of 2025). (Note: Comparing relative purchasing power of £50,000 in 1983 with 2025.) Government spending restrictions delayed the park's restoration and conversion, but it was fully opened to the public in 1990.

The present lake is about one-third of its original size and supports wildlife, including foxes, weasels, rabbits, hedgehogs, lapwings, kestrels, herons, coot, Canada geese and several species of newt. In 2007 the park was designated a Local Nature Reserve, one of only two in Trafford. The park is managed by Groundwork Greater Manchester.

== Transport ==
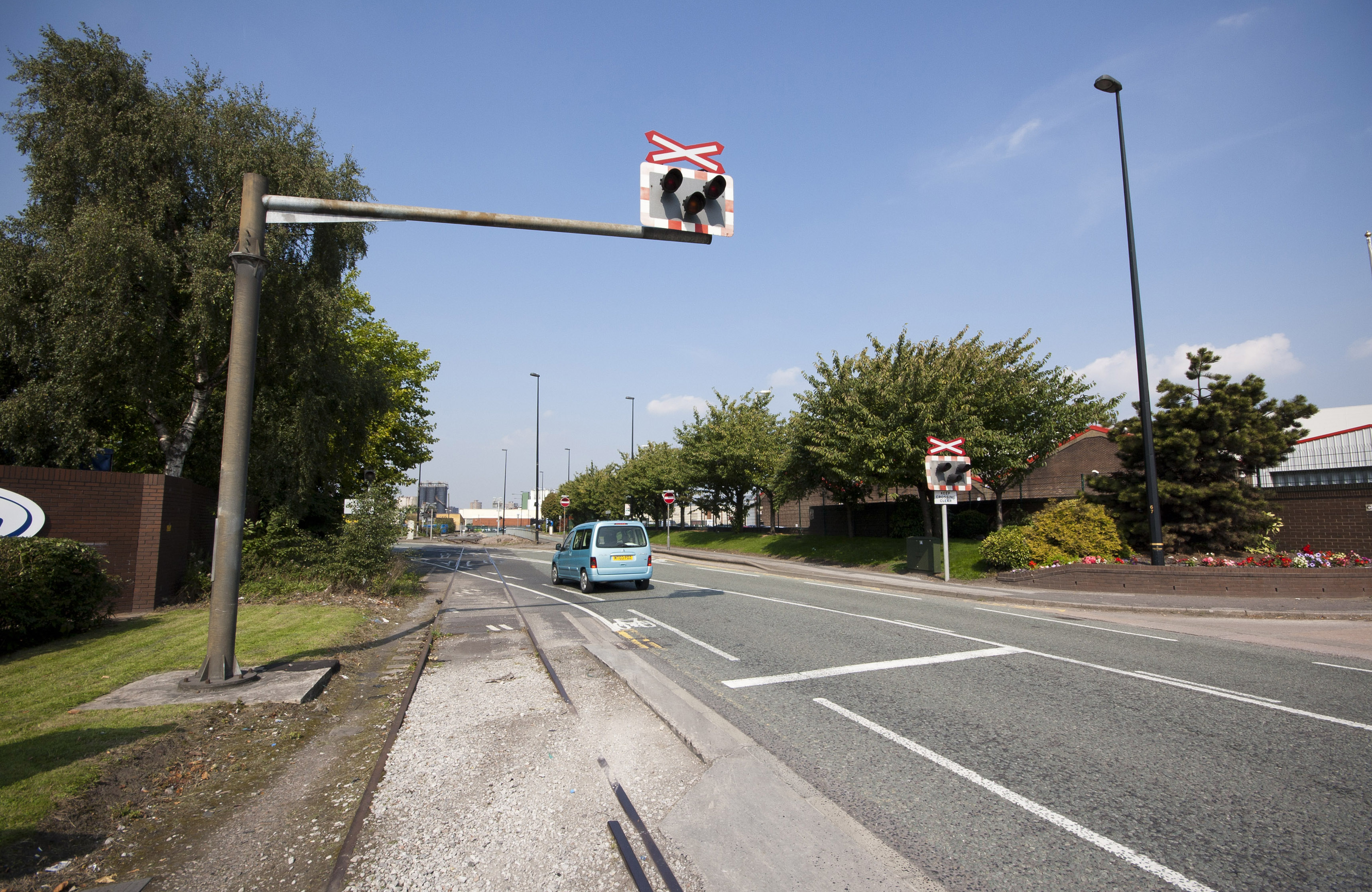
Trafford Park's railway system was closed in 1998, but much of its infrastructure remains.

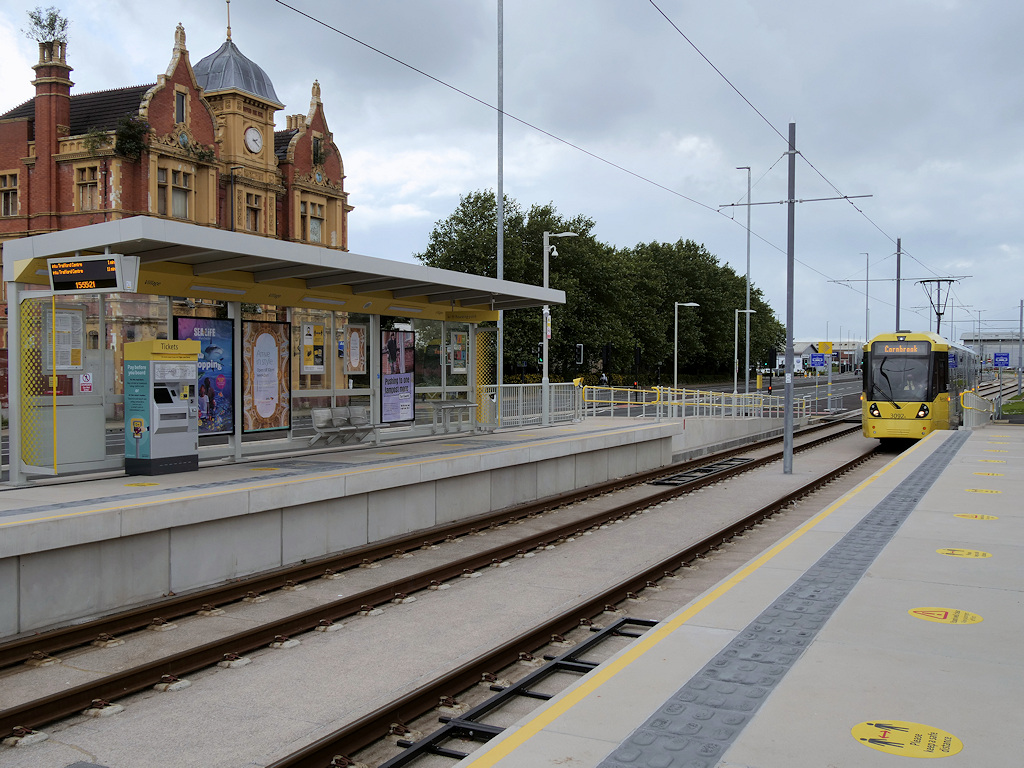
Since 2020, Trafford Park has been served by several Metrolink stops.

=== Historic ===
At the end of the 19th century there were no public transport routes in, and few running close to, Trafford Park. The Estates Company commissioned a gas-powered tramway, intended to carry both people and freight. The first tram ran on 23 July 1897; a few days later, a tramcar derailed and the service was suspended until the following year. The trams' maximum speed was 12 miles per hour (19 km/h) and their distinctive exhaust smell earned them the nickname "Lamp Oil Express". The service was operated by the British Gas Traction Company, which paid a share of its takings to the Estates Company, but by 1899 the company entered voluntary liquidation. Salford Corporation refused to provide gas for the trams, and the service was suspended until the Estates Company bought the entire operation for £2,000 in 1900. A separate electric tramway was installed in 1903, and was taken over by Manchester and Salford corporations in 1905. The gas trams continued until 1908, when they were replaced by steam locomotives. Between 1904 and 1907 the Estates Company operated a horse-drawn bus for those staying at Trafford Hall, then a hotel. The service was replaced by a motor car in 1907.

Trafford Park Act 1904
- Act of Parliament
- Parliament of the United Kingdom
- Long title: An Act for transferring the powers of the West Manchester Light Railways Company and for providing for the Regulation of certain Roads in Trafford Park and tor other purposes.
- Citation: 4 Edw. 7. c. ccxxv

Dates
- Royal assent: 15 August 1904

Text of statute as originally enacted

Under an 1898 agreement between the Estates Company and the Ship Canal Company, the latter committed to carry freight on their dock railway between the docks and the park and to construct a permanent connection between the two railway networks. The West Manchester Light Railway Company was set up the following year by the West Manchester Light Railways Order 1899 to take over the tramway operations and lay additional track. The Trafford Park Act 1904 (4 Edw. 7. c. ccxxv) passed responsibility for all of the park's roads and railways to the Trafford Park Company. The railway network could subsequently be extended as required, without the need to seek additional permissions from Parliament. The network was connected to the Manchester, South Junction and Altrincham Railway near Cornbrook. At its peak, the estate's railway network covered 26 route miles (42 km), handling 2.5 million tons of cargo in 1940. It fell into decline during the 1960s, exacerbated by the increasing use of road transport, and closed in 1998. Much of the railway's infrastructure remains, including a lengthy stretch of disused track.

Trafford Park Aerodrome was Manchester's first purpose-built airfield, laid out on a site between Trafford Park Road, Mosley Road, and Ashburton Road. The first aircraft landed there on 7 July 1911, flown from Liverpool by Henry G. Melly. The aerodrome was in use until the early years of the First World War, and possibly until 1918, when it was replaced by the newly completed Alexandra Park Aerodrome.

=== Current ===
Road signs in Trafford Park refer to the subdivisions of Ashburton, Dumplington, Mossfield, Mosley and Newbridge.

Trafford Park railway station, to the east of the area, is served by trains between Liverpool Lime Street and Manchester Oxford Road. The Trafford Park Euroterminal rail freight terminal, which can handle 100,000 containers a year, was opened in 1993, at a cost of £11 million.

Trafford Park is served by several Bee Network bus routes. Bus 248 runs between Eccles Interchange and Manchester Airport. Buses 250 and X50 run between Manchester city centre and the Trafford Centre.

Manchester Metrolink's Trafford Park Line from Pomona tram stop to Trafford Centre tram stop opened in March 2020, with stops at Wharfside, Imperial War Museum, Village, Parkway, Barton Dock Road and the Trafford Centre.
