= Trafford Waters =

Regeneration site in Greater Manchester

Coordinates: 53.47128°N 2.35471°W

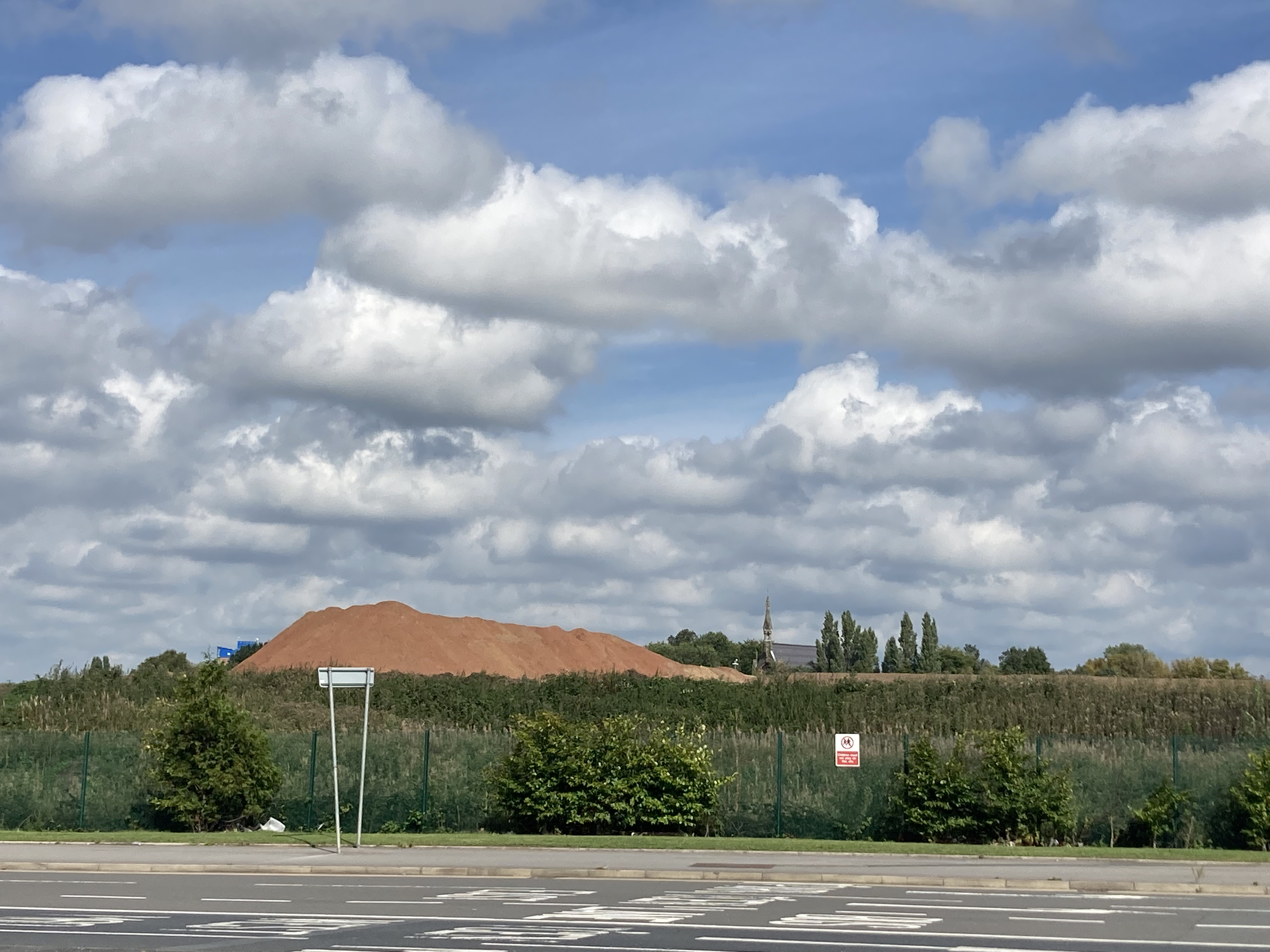
The south part of the site in 2022.

Trafford Waters is a major mixed-use development, currently under construction in Trafford, Greater Manchester on land between the Manchester Ship Canal and the Trafford Centre. The land is owned and will be developed by Peel Land & Property.

The development is proposed to take place in six phases over 15 years, with the first phase being completed by 2017–18. The area would be served by the proposed Trafford Quays Metrolink station.

The proposal includes 3,000 homes, areas for employment, a primary school, retail and community facilities.

Planning permission was granted in October 2016. The Trafford Waters masterplan received outline planning permission from Trafford Council in 2018 and planning permission for the infrastructure works was subsequently received. Construction started on the first 350 homes in October 2022.
