= British Gas Traction Company =

The British Gas Traction Company was incorporated on 13 July 1896 with an initial capitalisation of £250,000. Its major shareholders were Russell Cummins and John Fletcher Moulton MP The company was set up to operate gas-powered trams, which it worked initially on the Blackpool, St. Annes and Lytham tramway, the first such tramway in Britain. The early success of the vehicles led to the company being invited to operate similar schemes in other parts of the country, including a newly constructed three-mile stretch of tramway in Trafford Park. The Trafford Park service opened on 23 July 1897, but it was suspended only a few days later after two women were injured when one of the trams left the rails, and the service did not resume until 8 April 1898. The trams were powered by town gas, and had a maximum speed of 12 miles per hour (19 km/h); their distinctive exhaust smell quickly earned them the nickname "Lamp Oil Express".

By 1899 the company was in serious financial difficulties, and it went into compulsory liquidation on 1 November that year. It was subsequently administered by the liquidators until 29 August 1914, and removed from the register of companies on 14 February 1919.
