= Dumplington =

Coordinates: 53.4694°N 2.3555°W

- Location within Greater Manchester
- Metropolitan borough: Trafford
- Metropolitan county: Greater Manchester
- Region: North West
- Country: England
- Sovereign state: United Kingdom
- Post town: MANCHESTER
- Postcode district: M17, M41
- Police: Greater Manchester
- Fire: Greater Manchester
- Ambulance: North West
- UK Parliament: Stretford and Urmston

Dumplington is an area of Trafford, Greater Manchester, England.

Dumplington was one of several hamlets in the township of Barton-upon-Irwell, in the ancient ecclesiastical parish of Eccles in the hundred of Salford. Its name derives from the Old English dympel and ing and tun which means an enclosure by a pool. The hamlet lies six miles south west of Manchester city centre.

Dumplington was recorded in the Middle Ages in 1225 in land leases between Sir Robert Grelley and Cecily, daughter of Iorwerth de Hulton and Siegrith de Dumplington. John son of Thomas de Booth was the landowner in 1401.

The Roman Catholic church of All Saints is a Grade II* listed building, designed in 1867-8 by Edward Welby Pugin.

Since the late 1990s, there has been significant redevelopment in this area including the Trafford Centre, Trafford Waters and the extension of the Metrolink line.
