= Trafford Park Railway =

Disused railway system in Trafford, England

Coordinates: 53°27′30.76″N 2°18′10.66″W

The Trafford Park Railway System is a disused railway system that runs around the site of the large Trafford Park Industrial Estate. Rail service stopped in 1998, although some of the infrastructure remains.

== History ==
The system's history started at the end of the 19th century, when there were no public transport routes in Trafford Park. The size of Trafford Park meant that the estates company was obliged to provide some means of travelling around the park, and so a gas-powered tramway was commissioned to carry both people and freight. The first tram ran on 23 July 1897.

=== Early years ===
The service was operated by the British Gas Traction Company, which paid a share of its takings to the estates company, but by 1899 the company was in serious financial difficulty, and entered voluntary liquidation. Salford Corporation then refused to provide any more gas for the trams, and the service was once again suspended until the Estates Company bought the entire operation for £2,000 in 1900. A separate electric tramway was installed in 1903, and was taken over and operated by Manchester and Salford corporations in 1905. The takeover did not affect the gas trams however, which continued to run until 1908, when they were replaced by steam locomotives. Between 1904 and 1907 the estates company also operated a horse-drawn bus for the use of "gentlemen" staying at Trafford Hall, then a hotel. The service, available 24-hours a day, was replaced by a motor car in 1907.

Under an 1898 agreement between the estates company and the Ship Canal Company, the latter committed to carry freight on their dock railway between the docks and the park and to the construction of a permanent connection between the two railway networks. The West Manchester Light Railway Company was set up the following year to take over the operations of the tramway and to lay additional track. In 1904 responsibility for all of the park's roads and railways was passed to the Trafford Park Company, as a result of the Trafford Park Act 1904 (4 Edw. 7. c. ccxxv). The railway network could subsequently be extended as required, without the need to seek additional permissions from Parliament.

=== Size of network ===
The network was also connected to the Manchester, South Junction and Altrincham Railway near Cornbrook. At its peak, the estate's railway network covered 26 route miles (42 km), handling about 2.5 million tons of cargo in 1940. Like the rest of the park, it fell into decline during the 1960s, exacerbated by the increasing use of road transport, and it was closed in 1998.

=== Closure and demise ===
By the mid-1980s most of the network had become overgrown and neglected. Throughout the 1990s, as Trafford Park was redeveloped, much of the track was dismantled and crossings removed or tarmacked. However, sections of line do remain albeit isolated and unusable. The branch to Barton Dock freight terminal adjacent to the Trafford Centre became the last part of the maintained system (entirely within Trafford Park) to close. The line ceased to be used in 2012, and the track was largely lifted in 2014.

Trafford Park Euroterminal rail freight terminal, which is on the eastern side of Trafford Park, was formally opened on 5 October 1993 at a cost of £11 million. The 20 acres (8.1 ha) site has the capacity to deal with 100,000 containers a year. It uses a small section that was part of the original branch that once connected Trafford Park Railway with the lines of the pre-grouping Cheshire Lines Committee.
