= Trafford Park Line =

Light rail line on the Manchester Metrolink network in Greater Manchester, England

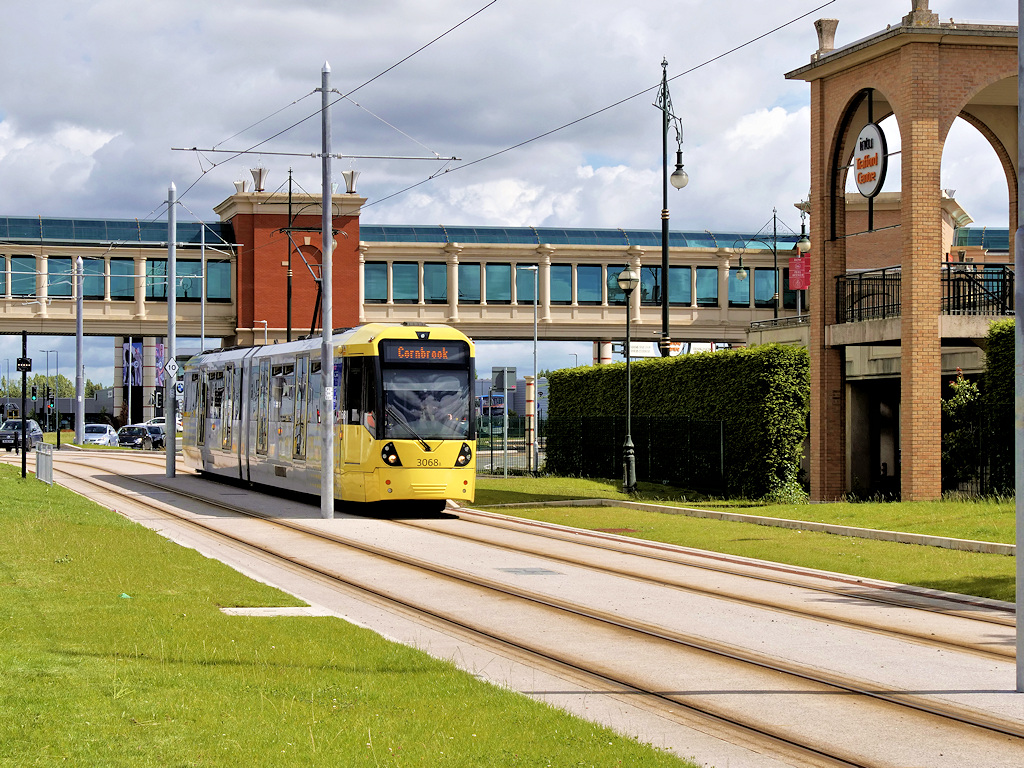
- A Bombardier M5000 tram approaching the Trafford Centre.

Overview
- Locale: Manchester; Trafford
- Termini: Pomona Crumpsall; The Trafford Centre
- Stations: 6
- Website: Transport for Greater Manchester

Service
- Type: Tram/Light rail
- System: Manchester Metrolink
- Rolling stock: Bombardier M5000

History
- Opened: 22 March 2020

Technical
- Line length: 5.5 km (3.4 mi)
- Character: Reserved track & limited street running
- Track gauge: 1,435 mm (4 ft 8 1/2 in) standard gauge
- Electrification: 750 volts DC overhead
- Operating speed: 40 mph (64km/h)

The Trafford Park Line is a Manchester Metrolink light rail line in Greater Manchester, England, which runs between a junction at Pomona and The Trafford Centre. Its name derives from Trafford Park, an area of the Metropolitan Borough of Trafford, and the first planned industrial estate in the world, which the line runs through for most of its length. The line opened on 22 March 2020.

== History ==
=== Planning ===
Plans for Metrolink to serve Trafford Park first obtained statutory approval via the Greater Manchester (Light Rapid Transit System) Act of 1992 but no funding was provided to construct the line at that time. The Trafford Park Line was included in the 2008 TIF proposal but this was rejected by the voting public. The line was excluded from the Phase 3 Metrolink development in May 2009 due to lack of funds.

In 2013, the GMCA and the Greater Manchester Local Enterprise Partnership announced that it may fund the construction of the Trafford Park Line as far as The Trafford Centre, estimating that the line could be open to passengers by 2018/19 (subject to a satisfactory business case, Transport and Works Act Order and public consultation). From July to September 2014, Transport for Greater Manchester conducted a public consultation to build the line resulting to some modifications to the route and the location of stops. In November 2014, the agency applied for power under the Transport and Works Act 1992 to build and operate the line. In October 2016, power to build the line was granted by the Secretary of State for Transport.

=== Construction and opening ===
Construction commenced in January 2017. The £350 million funding envelope was mostly provided by The Government as part of an arrangement with the Greater Manchester Combined Authority. £20 million was provided by Trafford Council.

The final stretch of track was laid in early November 2019. The first trams (fleet no. 3040 and 3014 coupled together) ran on the Trafford Park Line in the early hours of 10 November 2019 while on test. The stop opened to passengers on 22 March 2020, around eight months earlier than planned, despite suggestions that it might be delayed as part of a review of all Metrolink services because of the COVID-19 pandemic. Services initially ran between Cornbrook and intu Trafford Centre. The first passenger service tram (fleet no. 3073) stopped at Wharfside, the first stop on the line, at exactly 06:37.

=== Modifications since opening ===
- 23-24 January 2021: intu Trafford Centre tram stop was renamed to The Trafford Centre, after ownership of The Trafford Centre was transferred from intu to the Peel Group.
- 30 November 2022: Services from The Trafford Centre were extended from the current end at Cornbrook one stop further to Deansgate-Castlefield. This was to better support driver shift switchovers.
- 28 October 2025: Barton Dock Road, the penultimate stop on the line, was renamed to Trafford Palazzo after a partnership with the Peel Group and TfGM.
- 30 March 2026: Services from The Trafford Centre have been temporarily extended from the current end at Deansgate-Castlefield through the city centre to Crumpsall via Exchange Square, due to revert back in autumn 2026. This was done due to service frequencies being reduced temporarily across the network for a major recruitment drive at KeolisAmey Metrolink.

== Route ==
The Trafford Park Line begins at a junction with the Eccles Line immediately west of Pomona stop. The viaduct had been built with provisions in place for the line to branch off.

After the junction at Pomona, the tram line descends and passes underneath Trafford Road Bridge and reaches Wharfside tram stop. It continues to run alongside the Manchester Ship Canal for about a quarter of a mile before making two sharp turns to get to Imperial War Museum tram stop. After the stop, it merges into the central reservation section of Trafford Wharf Road, and later makes another sharp left turn to run along Warren Bruce Road. There are stabling sidings along this section, but they are not regularly used.

The line turns right again to run along Village Way and reaches Village tram stop. Half of the way to Parkway, the line continues to run adjacent to the road, but later merges into the central reservation again and reaches Parkway tram stop. After traversing through Parkway Circle, the tram line turns to get out of the road and onto a purpose-built tram bridge (the fastest section of the line), then turns right and runs adjacent to Barton Dock Road before reaching Trafford Palazzo tram stop. The tram line completely crosses Barton Dock Road after the stop and a short stretch brings the line to its terminus at The Trafford Centre.

The line may be extended to Port Salford in the future.

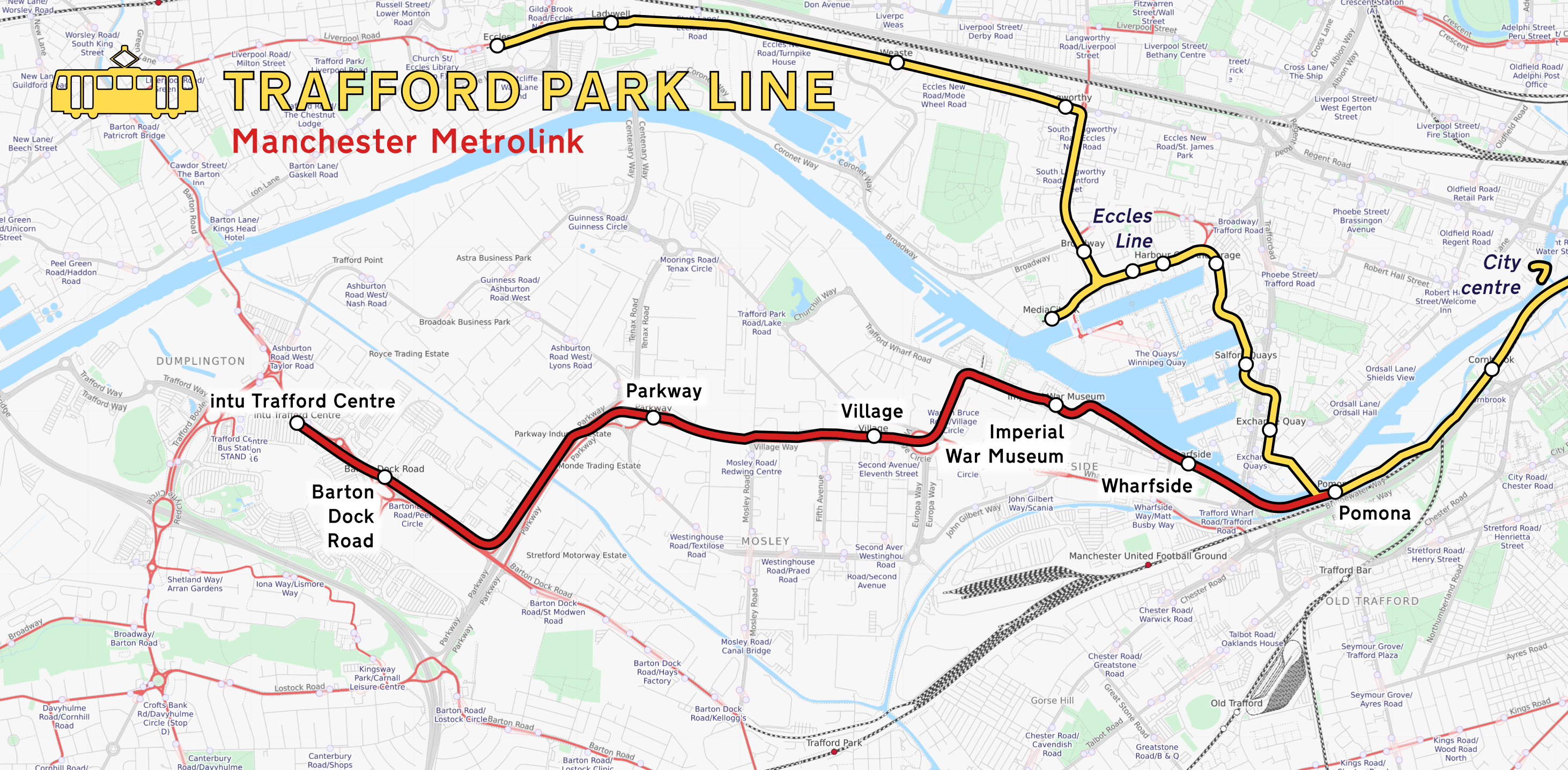
Map of the Trafford Park Line route (in red), and all stops on the route. Stop names are as of January 2021.

== Rolling stock ==
To provide rolling stock for the line and other service expansions, 27 Bombardier M5000 trams were ordered; these incorporate modifications to the existing fleet including new touch screen VECOM units for drivers.

== Services ==
Services operate between The Trafford Centre and Deansgate-Castlefield at a frequency of every 12 minutes Monday-Saturday, and every 15 minutes on Sundays.
