= Trafford Park railway station =

Railway station in Greater Manchester, England

Trafford Park
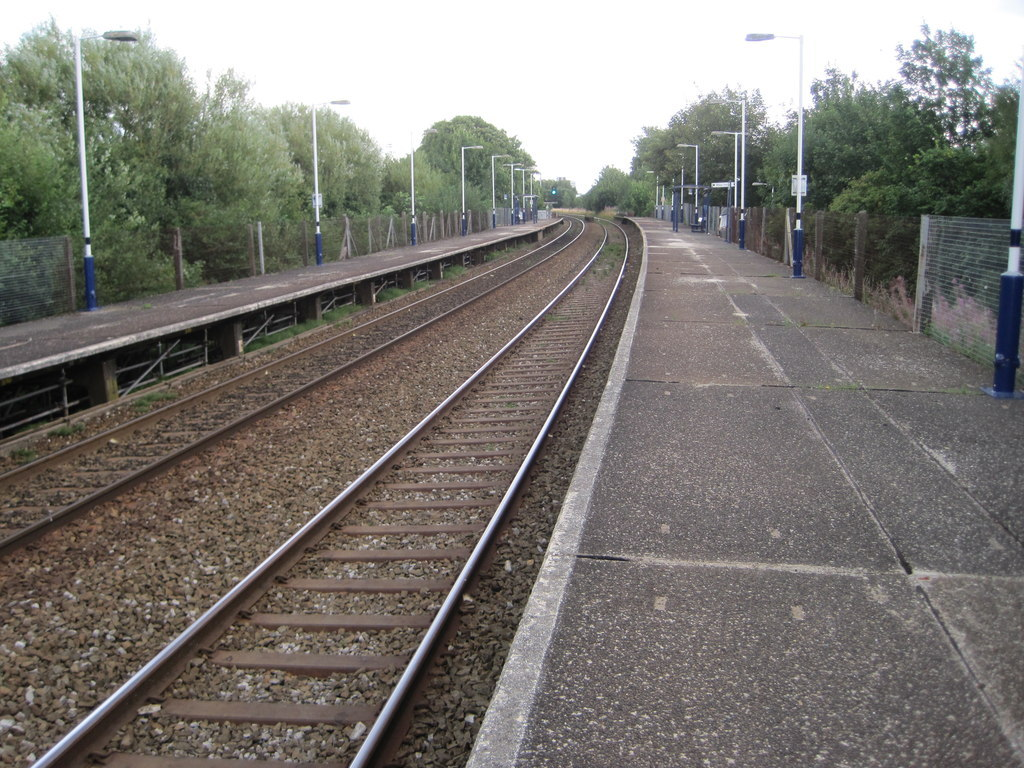

General information
- Location: Stretford, Trafford; England
- Coordinates: 53.4547°N 2.3117°W
- Grid reference: SJ794953
- Manager: Northern Trains
- Transit authority: Greater Manchester
- Platforms: 2

Other information
- Station code: TRA
- Classification: DfT category F1

History
- Original company: Cheshire Lines Committee
- Pre-grouping: Cheshire Lines Committee
- Post-grouping: Cheshire Lines Committee

Key dates
- 4 January 1904: Opened as Trafford Park
- ?: Renamed Trafford Park and Stretford
- 6 May 1974: Renamed Trafford Park

Passengers
- 2021/22: ▲31,320
- 2022/23: ▲36,768
- 2023/24: ▲38,530
- 2024/25: ▲44,548
- 2025/26: ▲50,152
Location
Notes
- Passenger statistics from the Office of Rail and Road

Trafford Park railway station serves the town of Stretford, close to the border of Trafford Park, in the Metropolitan Borough of Trafford, Greater Manchester. The station, and all services calling there, is operated by Northern Trains.

== History ==
The station was opened on 4 January 1904 by the Cheshire Lines Committee. Originally named Trafford Park, it was later renamed Trafford Park and Stretford but reverted to Trafford Park on 6 May 1974.

== Facilities ==
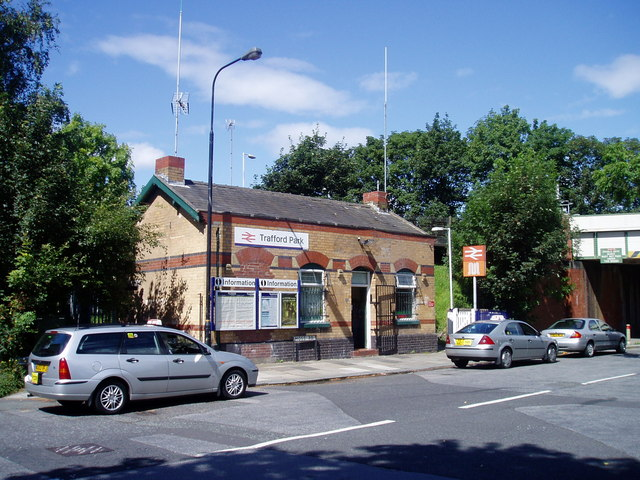
Station building

The station building is a disused taxi company office. The platforms are elevated, have shelters on each side and are reached by stepped ramps (no step-free access available). The station is unstaffed.

== Services ==
Services run every two hours off-peak, towards Humphrey Park and Liverpool Lime Street to the west and towards Deansgate and Manchester Oxford Road in the east. Services are more frequent during peak hours but may call at different stations. There is no Sunday service.

Oxford Road can be reached in 7 minutes and Liverpool Lime Street in 56 minutes.

| Preceding station | National Rail | Following station |
|---|---|---|
| Humphrey Park | Northern Trains; Manchester to Liverpool Line | Deansgate |
