= The Trafford Centre tram stop =

Manchester Metrolink tram stop

The Trafford Centre
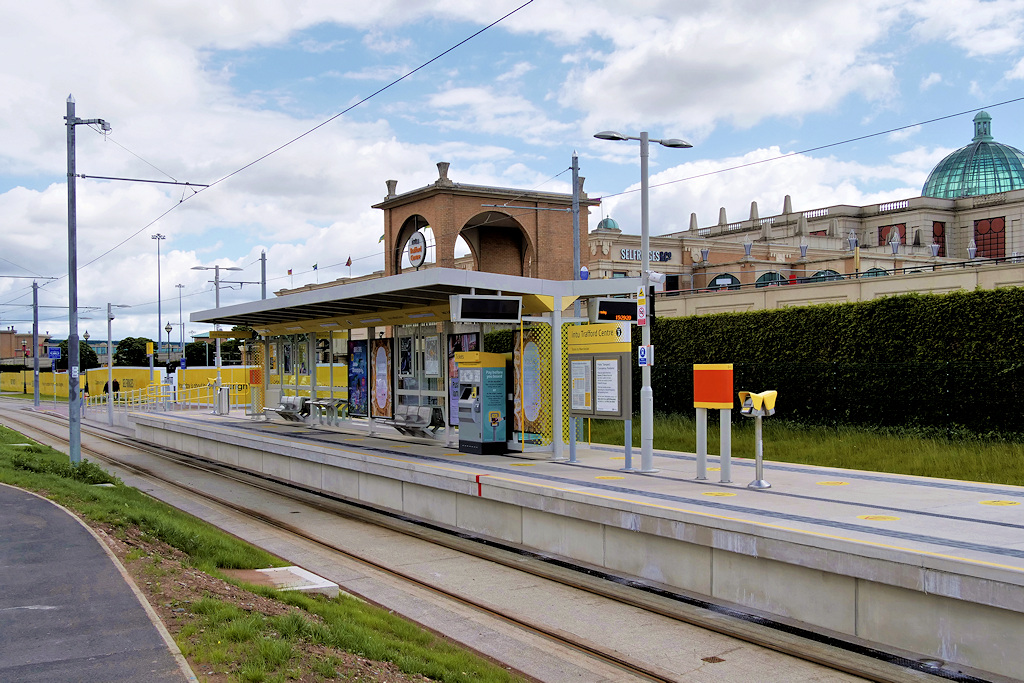

General information
- Location: Dumplington, Trafford; England
- Coordinates: 53.46789°N 2.34772°W
- System: Manchester Metrolink tram stop
- Line: Trafford Park Line
- Platforms: 2 (1 island platform)

Other information
- Status: In operation
- Fare zone: 3

Key dates
- 22 March 2020: Opened as intu Trafford Centre
- January 2021: Renamed The Trafford Centre
Location

The Trafford Centre is a tram stop on the Manchester Metrolink's Trafford Park Line, and the line's current terminus. It is located adjacent to Barton Dock Road between Ellesmere Circle and Bright Circle, and serves the like-named shopping centre.

This stop was previously known as intu Trafford Centre before intu ceased ownership of the shopping centre, the tram stop's namesake, in November 2020.

== History ==
In 2013, the Greater Manchester Combined Authority and the Greater Manchester Local Enterprise Partnership announced it may fund the construction of the Trafford Park Line as far as The Trafford Centre using the Earnback mechanism of the Greater Manchester City Deal, estimating that the line could be open to passengers by 2018/19 (subject to a satisfactory business case, Transport and Works Act Order and public consultation).

This stop was endorsed by former owner intu Properties, and opened on 22 March 2020. An alternative route to this stop also featured in Salford City Council's unitary development plan (2004–2016), whereby The Trafford Centre would be directly connected to Eccles via the A57 at Barton-upon-Irwell.

The stop opened to passengers on 22 March 2020, and the first passenger service tram (3073) stopped at The Trafford Centre just after 06:51.

Following the administration of the intu Group, the shopping centre was renamed to drop references to its former owner in November 2020. The changes took place gradually on the Metrolink network. Online references to the tram stop were altered from intu Trafford Centre to The Trafford Centre around January 2021.

== Layout ==
The Trafford Centre tram stop consists of two platforms (island platform).

On the east end of the platforms, there is one double-sided canopy, each with six seats and three perch seats underneath. Also underneath each one (nearer to the centre of the platform) is a ticket machine. Two passenger help points are also located on either side of the canopies.

Near the ticket machines, two dot matrix passenger information displays stand serving one platform each, and show estimated departure times for trams in minutes up to 30 minutes prior (up to three at a time) and number of carriages.

There isn't much except three signs on the west end of the platforms, each indicating the name of the stop, its fare zone, and tram destinations. Only one out of the three shows any closure notices for passengers.

== Services ==
Services run every 12 minutes on all routes. Some routes (not shown here) only run during peak times.

From this stop, services run to Castlefield in Manchester city centre via Imperial War Museum (for IWM North), and Wharfside (for Old Trafford Stadium).

Preceding station	Manchester Metrolink	Following station
Terminus	The Trafford Centre–Deansgate	Trafford Palazzo towards Deansgate-Castlefield

== Connecting transport ==
=== Other trams ===
The Trafford Centre tram stop is close to another stop on the line, Trafford Palazzo. It is a 5-10 minute walk between the two. There is a link bridge between The Trafford Centre and Trafford Palazzo that makes it easier for passengers accessing the eastern half of The Trafford Centre to instead alight at Barton Dock Road.

=== Buses ===
Some bus services serve The Trafford Centre tram stop directly, on routes 150 (Gorton–The Trafford Centre bus station) and 250 (Piccadilly Gardens–The Trafford Centre bus station).

The Trafford Centre has its own bus station, serving a variety of routes. It is a 5-minute walk away from the tram stop, though there are direct connections between them by bus as mentioned just above.

=== Trains ===
This tram stop is not directly connected to any railway stations, but the nearest one is Patricroft, approximately 1.5 miles away walking.

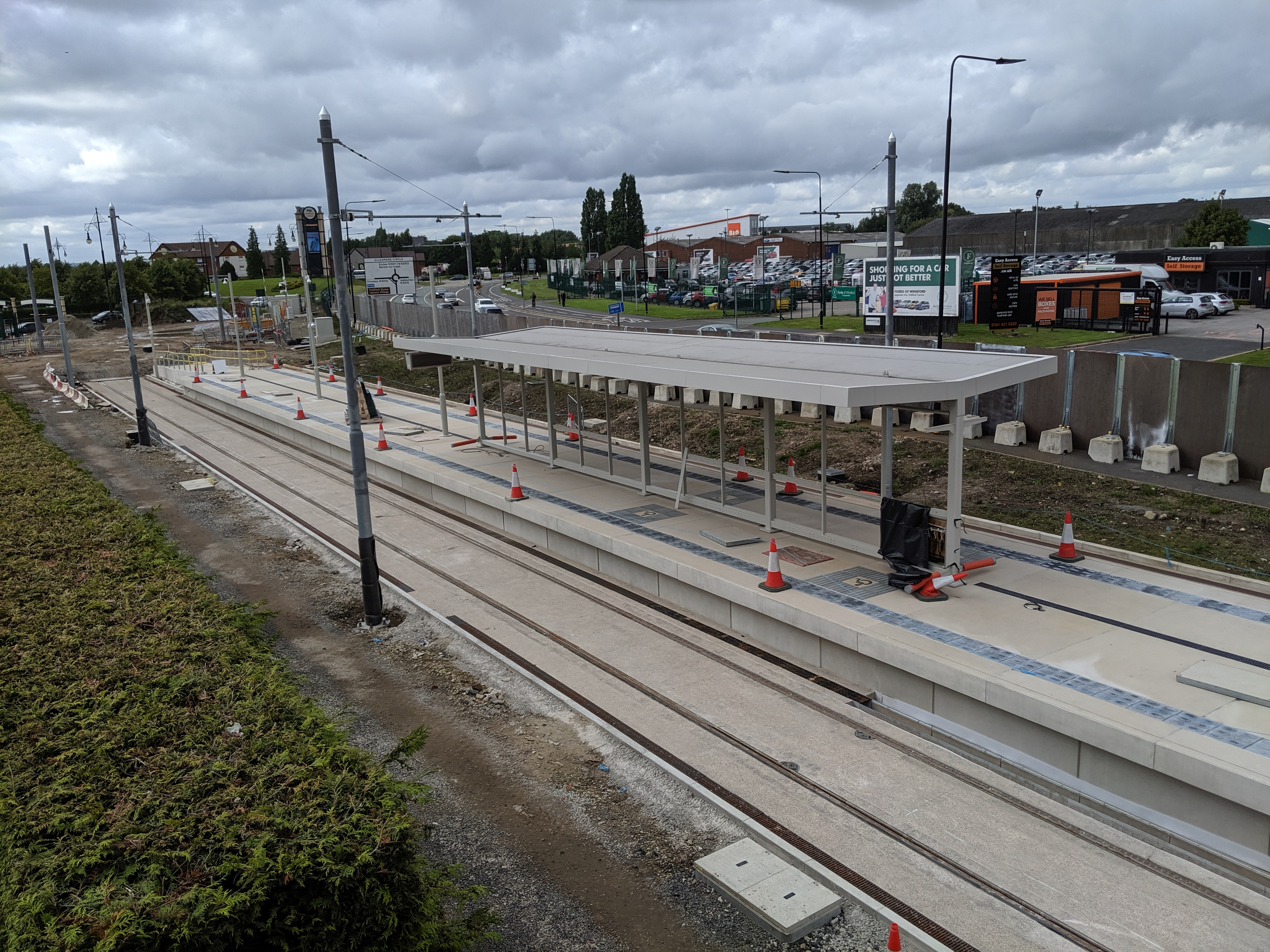
The tram stop under construction in August 2019.
