= Trafford (surname) =

Family name

Trafford is a British surname of Old English origin. The Trafford family is one of the oldest recorded families in England, tracing its roots back to Radulphus, who died in about 1050. As (Anglo-Saxons), the Traffords initially resisted the Normans, but were granted a pardon shortly after the Norman conquest of England, when they took the name de Trafford.

The creation of Trafford: Starting in April 1016, Cnut Sweynson of Norway and his army swept North-West across Wessex. Cnut's Viking army was composed of mercenary soldiers from Norway, Sweden, Denmark and Poland. They were led by a warrior named Rafe’ or Ranulph. They fought and defeated the army of “Wolvernote”, (likely Wolfnoth Cild, father of the future Earl Godwin and his brother Wolfnoth), at the fortified village of Whickleswick, near the old Roman river crossing of trey-ford on the river Irwell. In the spring of 1017 Cnut was crowned King of England. One of his first acts as king was to award the lands formerly controlled by “Wolvernote” to Ranulph and made him a lord. Ranulph established his demesne at trey-ford in a modest moated manor. He also took the name of the place, and became Ranulph, Lord of Trafford. This began the ancient family of Trafford. That manor would later be called “Trafford Hall” or “Moat House”, home of the Trafford family for the next 683 years.

Generation #1: Ranulf, Rafe, Ranulph, Radulphus Lord of Trafford, confirmed under Danish rule Born: between 965 and 992 (Scandinavia) Died: about 1050 at Trafford. Married: Adelaide about 1038 (Born about 994–1016, Died about 1050) Children: Radulphus of Trafford B: about 1037-1040 D: about 1100 Robert fitz Randolph of Trafford B:about 1068 D: about 1130 Established at Trafford House starting in 1017, also known as “Moat House” In 1017 is made lord of Trafford (Trey-ford) by King Canute, awarded the lands of “Wolvernote” “Radolphus owned many manors including at Trafford, Lancashire and Cheshire” Lived under King Canute and Edward the Confessor. Ranulf is noted as a Viking warrier that led Kind Canute's army to victory at the battle of Whittleswick.

Generation #2: Sir Radulphus de Trafford, Knight (1), 1st Lord of Trafford confirmed under Norman rule Born: about 1040 Died: about 1095–1100 Married: unknown Children: Robert fitz-Randolphus de Trafford B:about 1068 D:about 1130 Mary De Trafford M.1191 Sir Robert Laurens of Ashton Hall Knighted by the Earle of Chester, Sir Hughe d’Avranches in 1080 Awarded use of the “de Trafford” surname by royal decree by King William I in 1080 In 1087 Radulphus is awarded the manors and townships of Foxdenton and Chatterton by the King William II

The name Trafford may refer to:

- Anthony Trafford (1932–1989), British politician
- Charles de Trafford (1864–1951), British cricket player
- Charlie Trafford (born 1992), Canadian soccer player
- Dermot de Trafford (1925–2010), British banker
- Frank Trafford Taylor (1891–1943), Canadian lawyer
- Humphrey de Trafford (1808–1886), British landowner
- James Trafford (born 2002), English goalkeeper
- John de Trafford (born 1950), British businessman
- Mason Trafford (born 1986), Canadian soccer player
- Matthew J. Trafford (born 1979), Canadian writer
- Rod Trafford (born 1978), American football player
- Rudolph de Trafford (1894–1983), British banker
- Stan Trafford (1945–2020), British sportsman
- Thomas de Trafford (1778–1852), British landowner
- Tommy Trafford (1927–1993), British comedian

== See also ==
- Trafford, a borough of Greater Manchester, England
- Trafford (disambiguation)
- Old Trafford, a football stadium in the Greater Manchester borough and home of football team Manchester United F.C.
