= Croston =

Village in Lancashire, England

Coordinates: 53.662°N 2.777°W

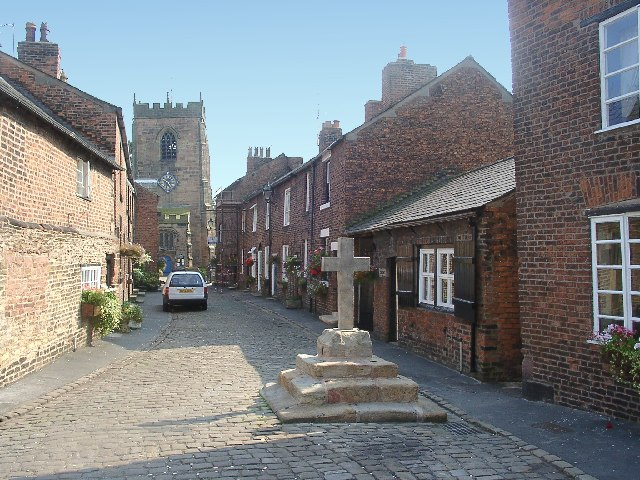
- Church Street, Croston village centre

- Shown within Chorley Borough Location within Lancashire
- Population: 3,098 (2021)
- OS grid reference: SD487187
- Civil parish: Croston
- District: Chorley
- Shire county: Lancashire
- Region: North West
- Country: England
- Sovereign state: United Kingdom
- Post town: LEYLAND
- Postcode district: PR26
- Dialling code: 01257/01772
- Police: Lancashire
- Fire: Lancashire
- Ambulance: North West
- UK Parliament: South Ribble

Croston is a village and civil parish near Chorley in Lancashire, England. The River Yarrow flows through the village. The population of the civil parish taken at the 2021 Census was 3,098.

== History ==
Croston was founded in the 7th century when St Aidan arrived at the riverside settlements. In the absence of a church, a cross was erected as a place of worship. The name is derived from the two Old English words 'cross' and 'tūn' (town/homestead/village) and is unique to the village.

The parish of Croston was formerly far larger than it is today. It included Chorley, Much Hoole, Rufford, Bretherton, Mawdesley, Tarleton, Hesketh Bank, Bispham, Walmer Bridge and Ulnes Walton. These became independent parishes as a result of a series of separations between 1642 and 1821. A charter granted by Edward I in 1283 permitted an annual medieval fair and market to be held on the village green. Pre-20th Century maps also depict a castle which is believed to have been of a wooden construction because there is no evidence of a stone structure.

Croston is twinned with the French town of Azay le Rideau, just south west of Tours, France. Azay boasts a French Renaissance château, one of the famous châteaux of the Loire, and is a popular tourist hotspot.

== Landmarks ==
Croston Hall was built by the De Trafford family and was the manor house to the village of Croston. The hall was demolished in the 1960s, but there is a new country house built on its site. The family were Roman Catholics, and employed Edward Welby Pugin to design a family chapel in the grounds of the house in 1857. It is a small building constructed of rock-faced sandstone and is in eclectic Gothic style. It was left to the people of Croston on the death of the last De Trafford in the 1960s.

Croston used to have a large brick police station which has recently been refurbished. It was replaced by a smaller police station in the 1970s, which itself has now closed.

== Transport ==
=== Train ===
Croston railway station serves the village and is on the Ormskirk Branch Line, originally built & opened by the Liverpool, Ormskirk and Preston Railway (later taken over by the Lancashire and Yorkshire Railway) in 1849. The rail link was reduced to single-line working in 1970.

=== Bus ===
As of March 2026 all of the village's buses are run by vison bus. The first route is the 115 to Chorley or Preston, the second route is the 337 to Chorley or Ormskirk and finally the 347 to Chorley or Southport.

== Education ==
Bishop Rawstorne Church of England Academy is the secondary school based in the village. It has between 800 and 900 pupils from the ages of 11 to 16.

Andrew Sprake and Simon Humphries from the band Failsafe, who featured in an episode of Inbetweeners, also studied here. The DJ Dave Dawson also studied here. Dave makes the Mind the gap announcements on the Docklands Light Railway.

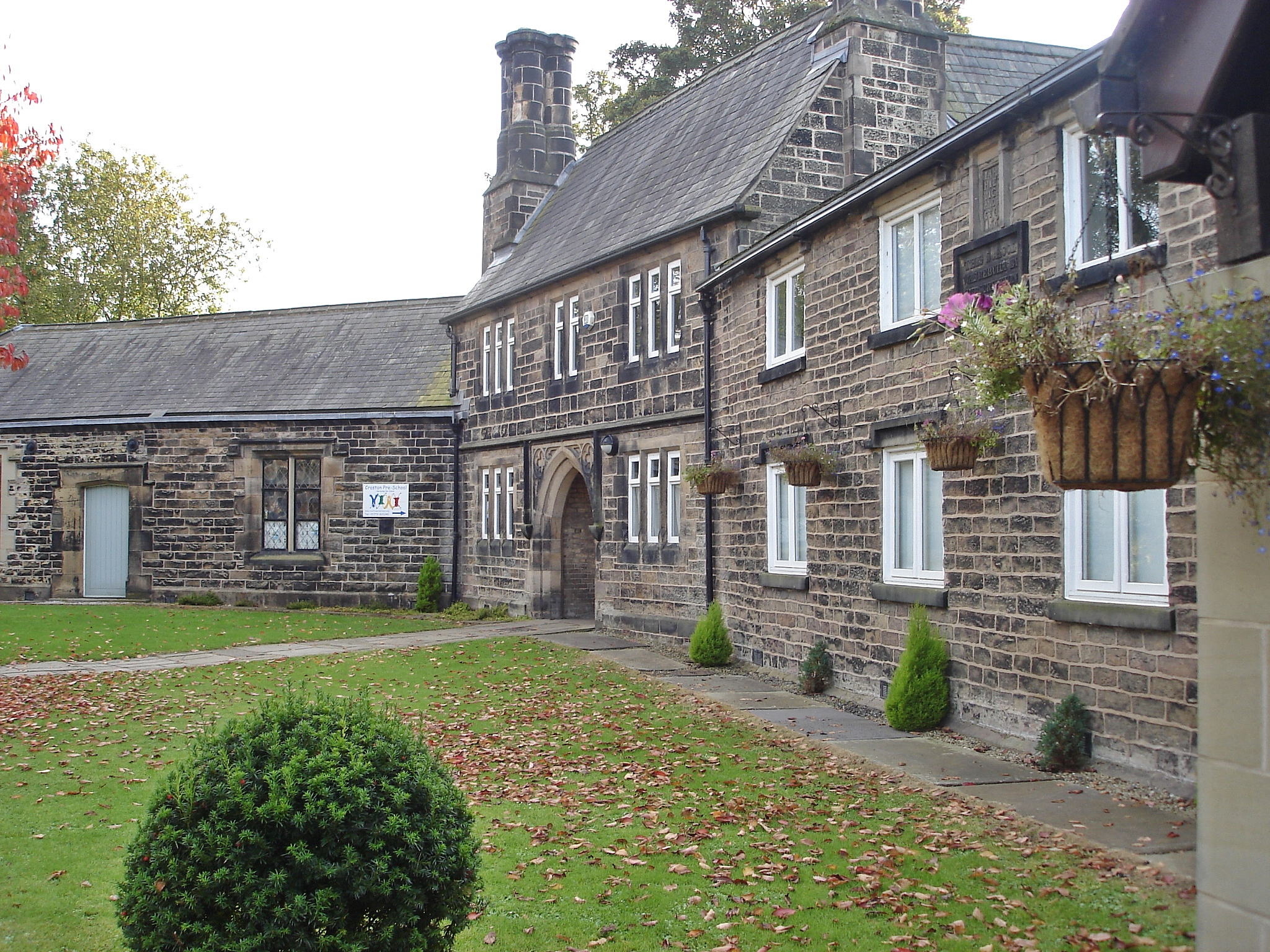
Croston Old School, Croston, Lancashire

Croston Old School is now a community resource centre. The building is a Grade II listed building which originates from 1660 but was substantially rebuilt in 1827, when the work was funded by subscriptions. Date stones commemorating both the original build and the rebuild are evident in the first-floor wall. It is located within the churchyard, in the centre of the village at the end of Church Street and next to the church building. Until 1999 the buildings were used as a school. Croston Old School Community Trust's grant from the National Lottery for £481,062 has funded the majority of a scheme to create a community resource centre for Croston. The building provides a large community space with meeting rooms and is the home of the photographic archives of Croston. There is also a pop-up cafe on Wednesday and Thursday mornings.

== Religion ==
The parish church is dedicated to St Michael and All Angels, and is a Grade II* listed building. It appears to be based on a 15th-century design, but was reworked in the 16th century, and altered in the 17th. A partial rebuilding took place in the 18th century, and it was substantially altered in the 19th century. It consists of a nave and chancel with north and south aisles, mostly built of red sandstone with stone tiles. Croston Old School is located within the Churchyard.

A payment was made of farm rents amounting to £50,000 per year collected in fixed proportions by the Rectors of Croston, Hoole, Chorley, Rufford, and Tarlton and which until at least 1910 was paid to the representatives of the Hon. Mrs. Dashwood whose ancestor had purchased the rights in the reign of Charles II. This income had been taken by Henry VIII from the Convent of Zion at the time of the Dissolution and sold. The funds taken were those used to fund religious houses. The Churchyard had been the site of Becconsall chapel until 1660, when the Reverend James Hyett built the school there. He had been appointed to his post by Charles I in 1625, but by 1662 he felt unable to conform to the Act of Uniformity and was ejected from the Church, he died the same year and in his will left an endowment to the school. Rev Hyett was succeeded by Rev. James Pilkington, elder brother of Elizabeth Breres who with her husband held the Manor of Rivington

== Notable people ==
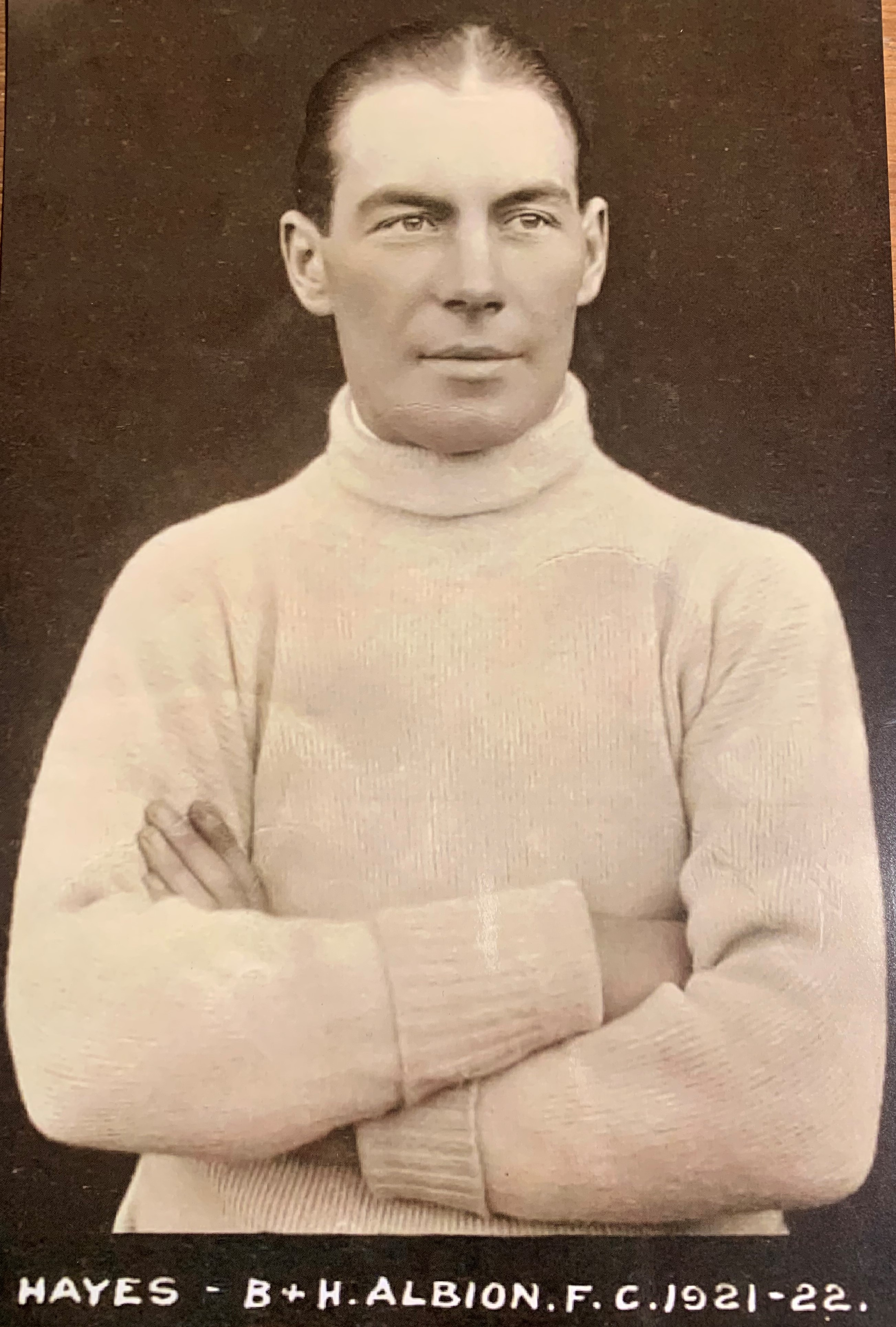
Billy Hayes, 1921

- Thomas Norris (1765–1852), businessman, art collector, natural historian and astronomer.
- Sir Thomas Joseph de Trafford, 1st Baronet (1778–1852), landowner and prominent Roman Catholic from Croston Hall
- Sir Humphrey de Trafford, 2nd Baronet (1808–1886), prominent Catholic, born at Croston Hall, he opposed the Manchester Ship Canal
- Sir John Wright, 1st Baronet (1843–1926), a British steel manufacturer.

=== Sport ===
- Billy Hayes (1895–1956), football goalkeeper, played 209 games for Brighton & Hove Albion
- Mark Bonner (born 1974), footballer, went to school locally, played 355 games, including 178 at Blackpool.

== See also ==
- Liverpool, Ormskirk and Preston Railway
- Croston Hall
