= Trafford (disambiguation) =

Trafford is a metropolitan borough in Greater Manchester, England.

Trafford may also refer to:

== People ==
- Trafford Leigh-Mallory (1892–1944), British Air Chief Marshal
- Trafford Smith (1912–1975), British colonial civil servant and Ambassador to Burma
- Trafford (surname)
- De Trafford baronets, including a list of de Traffords

== Places ==
- Trafford, Alabama, United States, a town
- Trafford, Pennsylvania, United States, a borough near Pittsburgh

== Other uses ==
- Trafford F.C., a football club based in Trafford
- Trafford College, Trafford, England
- Trafford Centre, a shopping mall in Trafford, England
- Trafford Hall, a former country house in Cheshire, England, now a hotel
- Trafford Mill, a water mill in Cheshire
- Trafford Publishing, a Canadian vanity press using print-on-demand technology

== See also ==
- Old Trafford (disambiguation)
- Bridge Trafford, a hamlet in Cheshire, England
- Mickle Trafford, a village in Cheshire
- Wimbolds Trafford, a village in Cheshire
