= Croston Hall =

- Location within the Borough of Chorley

General information
- Architectural style: Gothic
- Location: Croston, England
- Coordinates: 53.657°N 2.766°W
- Construction started: 17th century
- Demolished: Mid 1960s
- Client: De Trafford

Technical details
- Structural system: Brick

Croston Hall was a country mansion house, built in a gothic style architecture, situated in the village of Croston, Lancashire, England.

== History ==
The original Croston Hall was constructed in the 14th century, for the Assheton family. The old hall was taken down and a new hall was erected in the 19th century and was occupied by Henry Tempest, a magistrate, following his marriage to Jemima, the daughter of Joseph Thomas Trafford, whose family owned the hall for the rest of its existence. The last Croston Hall was built by the De Trafford Family in the 19th century to the east of the village of Croston. Thomas de Trafford, who was born at Croston Hall, became 1st Baronet.

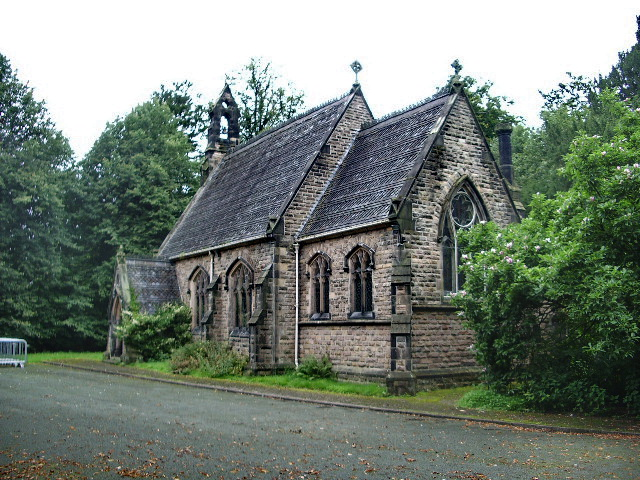
The chapel (2008)

The last of the De Trafford family to live at the hall was Geoffrey de Trafford - known locally as "the Squire" and his sister. He died in 1960, followed by his sister in 1964. Neither had an heir, so when he died, the small chapel in the grounds along with 2 acres (8,100 m^{2}) of land around it was left for the use of the Catholic people of Croston, and the rest of the land was left to the Archdiocese of Liverpool. Croston Hall was pulled down in the mid 1960s but the stables and the walled garden buildings were left, as was the lodge and the bridge.

The land has all been sold and a new Croston Hall has recently been built by a local businessman in the Lutyens style next to the walled garden.
