= Hey House =

Listed building in Ramsbottom, Greater Manchester, England

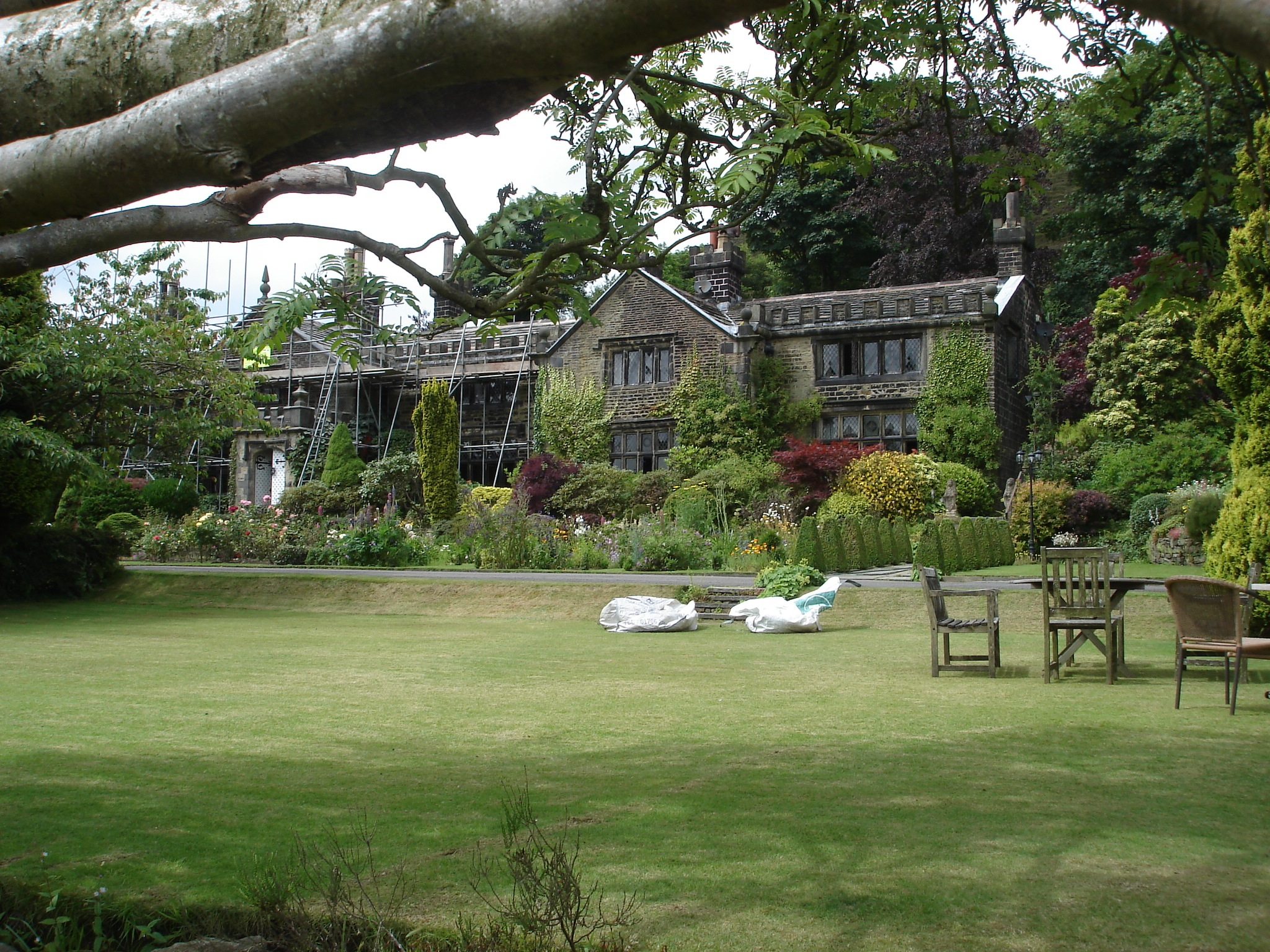
- Hey House in 2014

- Location within Greater Manchester

General information
- Location: Holcombe Old Road, Ramsbottom, Greater Manchester, England
- Coordinates: 53.6393°N 2.3390°W
- Year built: c. 1616; 410 years ago
- Renovated: 17th century (wings added)
- Client: de Trafford family

Listed Building – Grade II*
- Official name: Hey House
- Designated: 9 August 1966
- Reference no.: 1067269

Hey House is a Grade II* listed building on Holcombe Old Road in Ramsbottom, a market town within the Metropolitan Borough of Bury, Greater Manchester, England. Built around 1616 as a Jacobean hunting lodge for the de Trafford family, it was enlarged later in the 17th century and is recorded in parish documents by the 1650s. The house is traditionally associated with the Holcombe Hunt, established in 1708, and is believed to have served as its early base. It also contains interior features said to have been salvaged from Whalley Abbey after the Dissolution. Now divided into two dwellings, Hey House retains much of its historic character, and its former outbuildings have been converted for residential use.

== History ==
Hey House was constructed by Robert Brown in circa 1616 as a Jacobean hunting lodge for the de Trafford family. Built during the early 17th century, the house was later expanded with additional wings added within the same century. Church records from 1657 mention a Thomas Brown residing at Hey House.

The house is believed to have served as the base for the Holcombe Hunt, which was established in 1708. The pack of hounds performed so impressively during a hunt organised for King James I's visit to nearby Hoghton Tower, hosted by Sir Gilbert Hoghton, that the group were granted a Royal Warrant to hunt across 12 townships. In 1772 the kennels were relocated from Hey House to Tagg Wood, where they remained until 1926, before being moved to Tottington.

The property also has long-standing connections to Whalley Abbey, with several interior fittings and woodwork reportedly salvaged from the abbey following its dissolution.

The building was later divided into two dwellings, but retains much of its original character. It has been referenced in historical accounts of Holcombe village and is considered a key part of the area's heritage. On 9 August 1966, Hey House was designated a Grade II* listed building. The house's former coach house, stables, kennels, and farm buildings have also been fully converted for residential use.

== Architecture ==
Hey House is constructed from stone and follows a long rectangular plan with two storeys. Its windows are adorned with stone mullions and transoms, featuring small diamond panes that are characteristic of Jacobean design.

Among its notable architectural features is a segmental-arched stone barrel vault tunnel leading from the kitchen. In the west wing, wall seating has been fashioned from pews originally from Whalley Abbey. The house also contains multiple carved fireplaces, including examples dated 1671 and 1695, as well as wood panelling that dates from the late 17th to early 18th century.

Additional decorative elements include stained-glass medallions, one of which bears the date 1616, and distinctive ball and obelisk finials along with an embattled parapet crowning the structure. The east wing houses much of the carved woodwork and a door believed to have originated from Whalley Abbey. At the rear of the house, another carved door also bears the date 1616, affirming the building's early 17th-century origins.

== See also ==
- Grade II* listed buildings in Greater Manchester
- Listed buildings in Ramsbottom
