= National Benevolent Fund for the Aged =

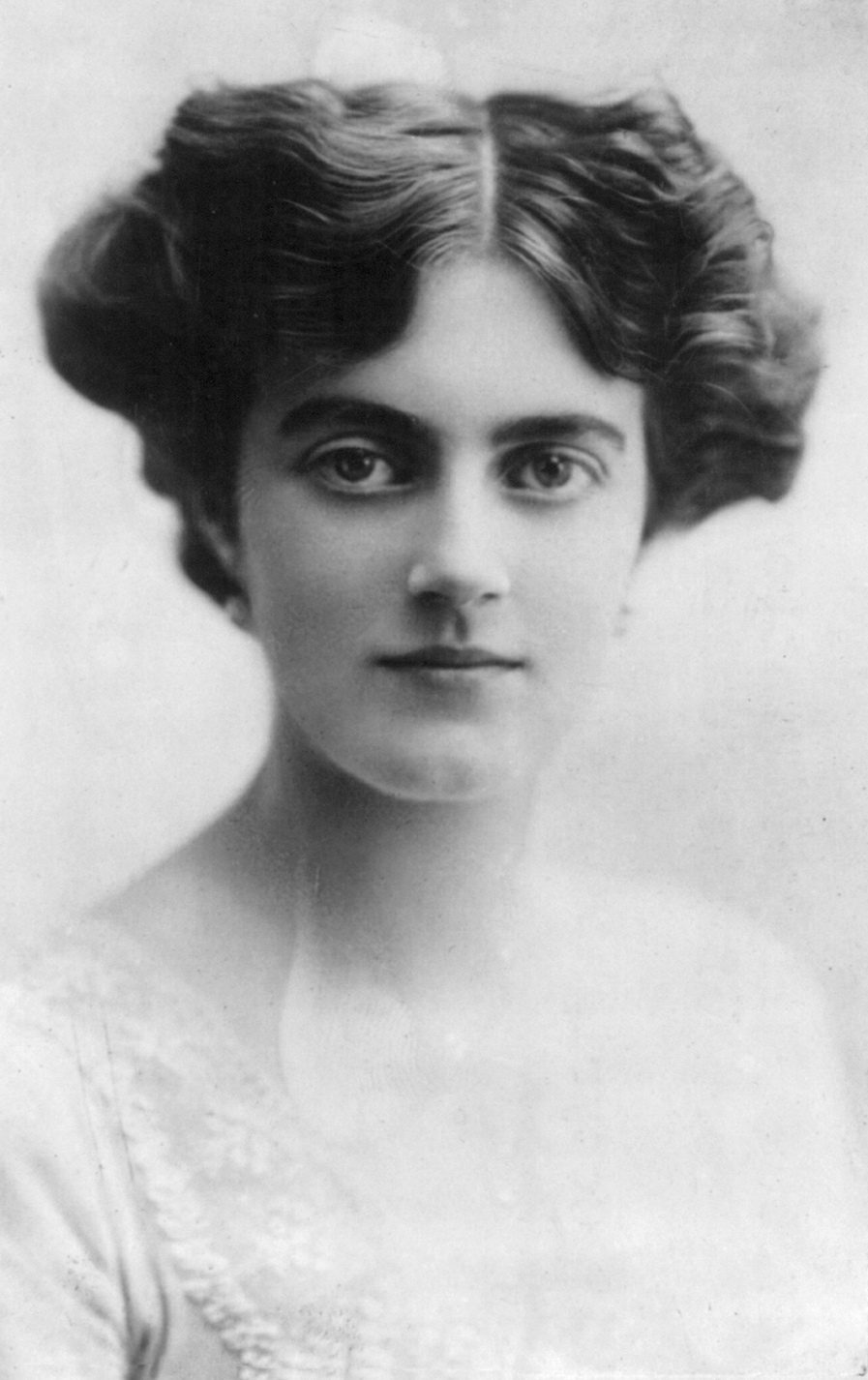
- Clementine Churchill, Baroness Spencer-Churchill became president in 1972
- Successor: NBFA Assisting the Elderly
- Formation: 1957
- Founder: Jeremy Thorpe
- Dissolved: 2015
- Type: Charity
- Purpose: Provided support for isolated, marginalised and lonely older people on low incomes

The National Benevolent Fund for the Aged was registered as a charity in 1957 and became NBFA Assisting the Elderly in 2012. Working across the United Kingdom it provided support for isolated, marginalised and lonely older people on low incomes until 2015 when it closed operations, merging its remaining funds and assets with the charity Contact the Elderly.

== Description ==
The charity's long held mission was to tackle the widespread problem of loneliness and isolation for older people through services that offer access to social contact and support. By 2011 a national campaign - the Campaign to End Loneliness - was set up and represents a significant step in raising the profound problems of social isolation for a fast growing and ageing population in the UK. NBFA Assisting the Elderly continued to work to address loneliness and isolation by providing direct services to disadvantaged older people, particularly in areas of high deprivation.

The charity began by distributing financial grants to existing organisations and charities supporting older people. The first of its own services was to donate television sets to isolated older people - in the days when friends and neighbours would gather in the nearest home with access to a television. The most popular and longest lasting service was short breaks to the seaside, later re-modelled as friendship and respite breaks, and by 1996 over 35,000 older people had benefited from a short seaside break. Other services included donating emergency home alarms for vulnerable older people still living at home and donating TENS pain control machines for older people coping at home with medical conditions which caused them chronic pain. In 2015 the charity closed its operations and intended to distribute remaining funds for the benefit of disadvantaged older people.

Founded in 1957 by MP Jeremy Thorpe as one of its early trustees, the charity has always been rooted in its connections with Westminster and the Churchill family. Clementine Churchill (widow of the prime minister) became president in 1972. The chairman from 1995 to 2010 (and trustee since 1974) was Winston Churchill (grandson of the former prime minister), The sole patron for many years was Mary Soames, Baroness Soames (daughter of Prime Minister Winston Churchill).

Former trustees included Paul Burstow, Dermot de Trafford, John de Trafford, Roger Pincham, Jeff Rooker, Baron Rooker, Laura Sandys, Stephen Lloyd, Sheila Gilmore and Tony Newton, Baron Newton of Braintree. The vice presidents were Frederick Forsyth, Christopher Herbert, John Alderdice, Baron Alderdice, Dafydd Elis-Thomas and David Steel. George Thomas, 1st Viscount Tonypandy was appointed chairman of the NBFA in 1984 and served for a decade and was then appointed honorary president. He was succeeded as president by Betty Boothroyd who held that post until her retirement in 2015.
