= Manchester and Salford Yeomanry =

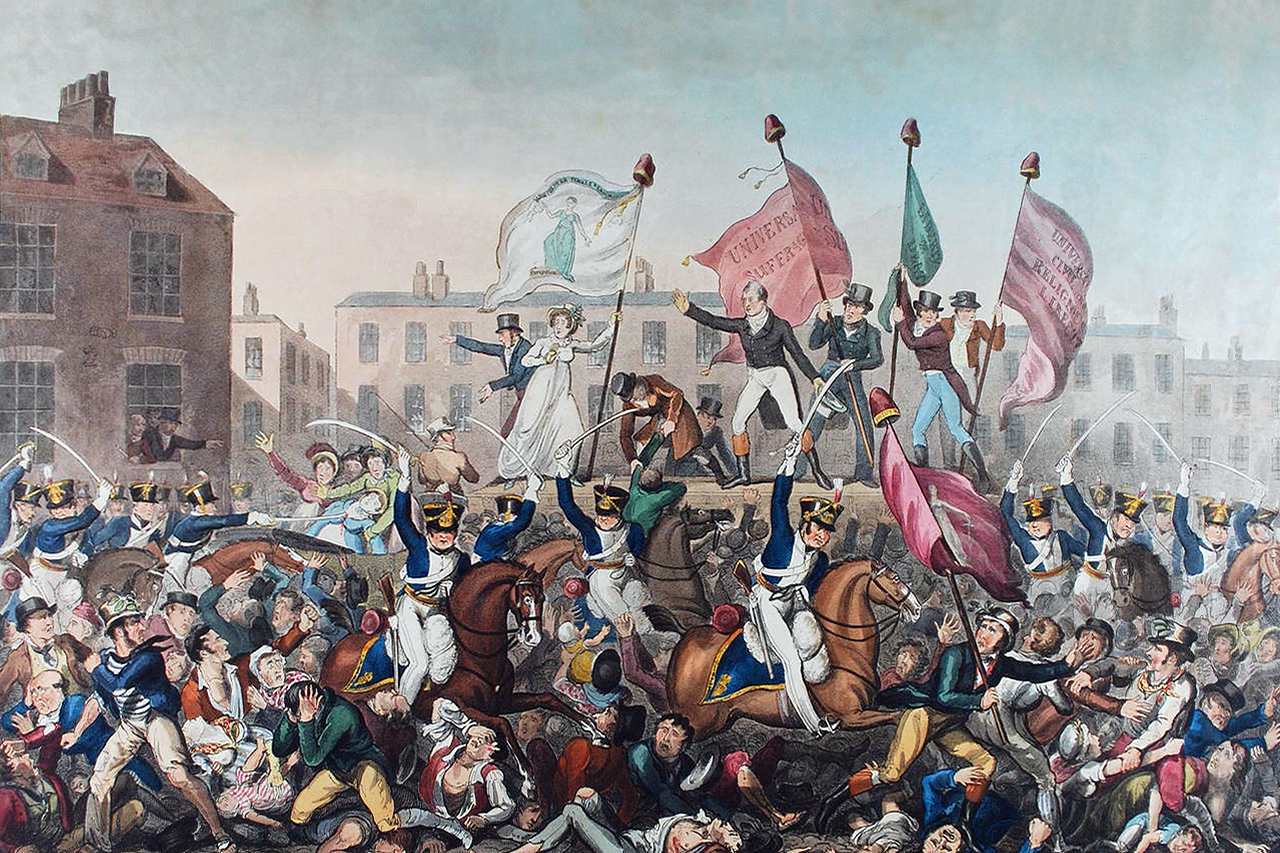
- The regiment committing the Peterloo Massacre
- Active: 19 June 1817 – 9 June 1824
- Country: United Kingdom
- Branch: Yeomanry Cavalry
- Type: Cavalry

Commanders
- Notable commanders: Thomas Trafford

The Manchester and Salford Yeomanry, often referred to simply as the Manchester Yeomanry, was a regiment of the Yeomanry Cavalry. Raised in 1817 by military volunteers in response to social unrest in northern England, the regiment became notorious for its involvement in the 1819 Peterloo Massacre, in which as many as 18 civilians were killed and 4700 injured by a government force which included the regiment. The regiment was disbanded in 1824.

== Formation ==
After the end of the Napoleonic Wars in 1815, many textile workers in the newly industrialised towns of northern England lost their jobs as a result of an economic slump connected to the reduced need for matériel. Even for those still employed, rising food prices made life very difficult. At the same time, writers such as William Cobbett were denouncing the inequity of the electoral system, as evidenced by rotten boroughs. Poor mill workers were a naturally sympathetic audience for a succession of radical organisers and speakers who spoke of electoral reform and alleviating poverty.

This radical movement deeply worried many supporters of the Tory party, particularly in northern England. The fear of popular revolt had begun with the American and French revolutions in the late 18th-century. Many Tory supporters, such as mill owners, landowners and tradesmen, saw the agitation for suffrage as little less than sedition. The Tory party strongly opposed the proposed reforms.

On 10 March 1817, about 5,000 people met in St Peter's Field in central Manchester, aiming to march to London to set their grievances before the Prince Regent. Each person carried a rug or blanket, leading them to be named Blanketeers. The march was quickly suppressed, but Manchester Tories worried that they lacked protection from the hostile masses. This fear spurred a petition with more than 100 signatures to "the Boroughreeves and Constables of Manchester and Salford" demanding a meeting to establish a yeomanry corps. The constables organized the meeting for 19 June 1817. Wheeler's Manchester Chronicle reported that those present resolved "that under the present circumstances it is expedient to form a body of Yeomanry Cavalry in the Towns and neighborhood of Manchester and Salford". The newspaper noted that government allowances were available for uniforms, and that if neighboring towns formed their own corps they might be later combined. Each man was to provide his own horse.

Thomas Trafford, owner of substantial lands in Lancashire and Cheshire, was commissioned as the cavalry's first Major-Commandant on 23 August 1817. As with many yeomanry regiments of the time, it was a relatively inexperienced militia recruited from among shopkeepers and tradesmen. A notice in the London Gazette on 6 October 1818 listed the appointment of officers to the corps over the past year.

Commissions in the Manchester and Salford Yeomanry Cavalry, signed by the Lord Lieutenant of the County Palatine of Lancaster.

Thomas Joseph Trafford, Esq. to be Major-Commandant. Dated 23d August 1817.

Robert Josias Jackson Nomeys, Esq. to be Captain. Dated 30 September 1817.

Hugh Hornby Birley, Esq. to be ditto. Dated as above.

Robert Hindley, Esq. to be ditto. Dated as above.

Richard Jones Withington, Esq. to be Lieutenant. Dated as above.

Edward Vigor Fox, Esq. to be ditto. Dated as above.

Richard Simpson, Esq. to be dito. Dated 17 April 1818.

Josiah Kearsley, Esq. to be Cornet. Dated 30 September 1817.

Thomas Heywood, Esq. to be ditto. Dated as above.

Edward Milne, Esq. to be ditto. Dated 17 April 1818.

Thomas Ollier, Gent. to be Surgeon. Dated 5 December 1817.

— London Gazette 6 October 1818, page 1791.

== Peterloo Massacre ==
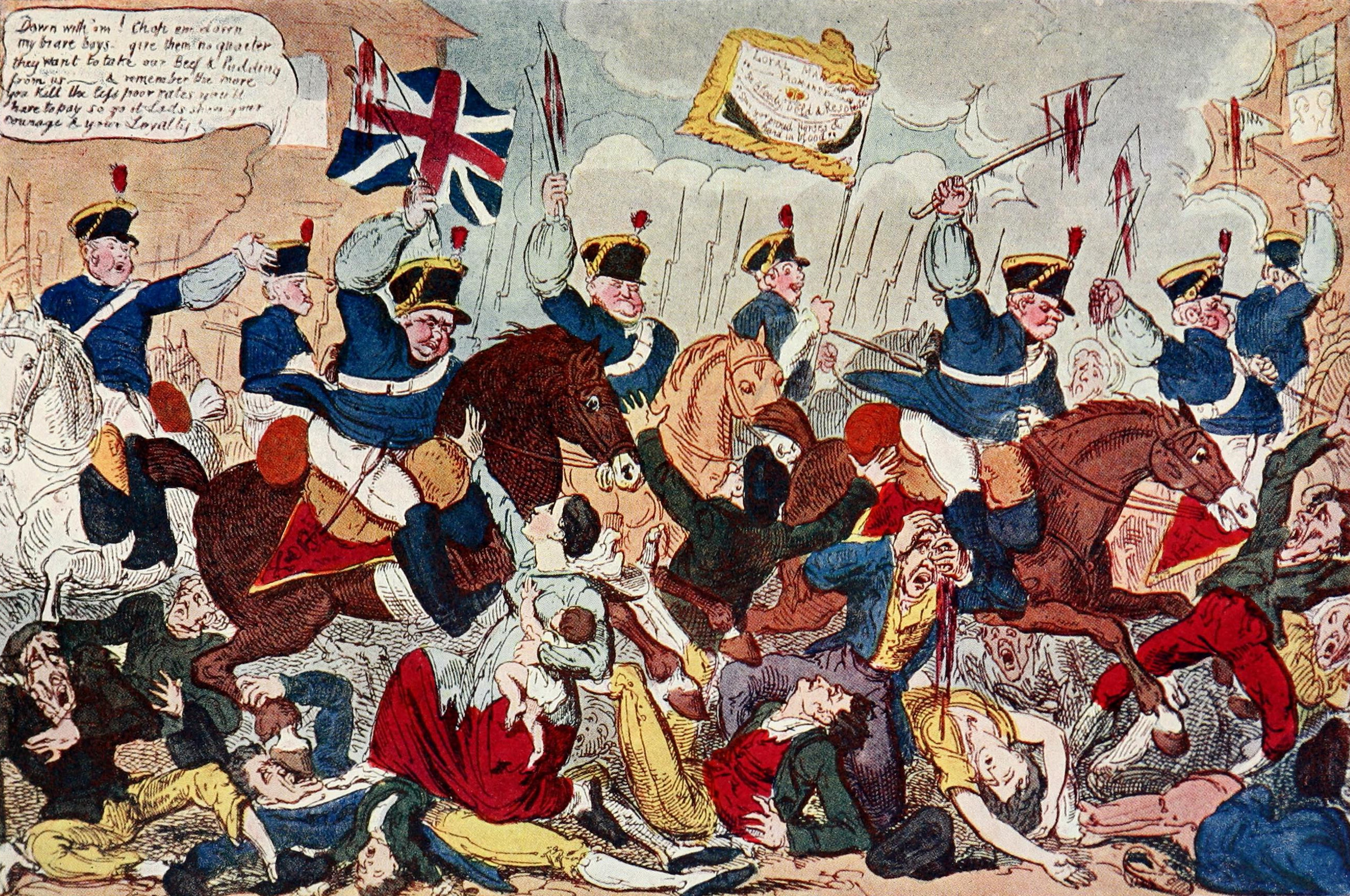
1819 caricature by George Cruikshank showing the regiment charging the rally in St Peter's Fields

On 16 August 1819, Major Trafford and Lieutenant Colonel Guy L'Estrange, the overall military commander in Manchester, were sent notes by the chairman of the Lancashire and Cheshire Magistrates, local coalowner William Hulton, urging them to dispatch troops to a public meeting on voting reform being addressed by the orator Henry Hunt.

Sir, as chairman of the select committee of magistrates, I request you to proceed immediately to no. 6 Mount Street, where the magistrates are assembled. They consider the Civil Power wholly inadequate to preserve the peace. I have the honour, & c. Wm. Hulton.

The notes were handed to two horsemen standing by. The Manchester and Salford Yeomanry were stationed just a short distance away in Portland Street, and so received their note first. Trafford dispatched 116 officers and men of the Manchester and Salford Yeomanry who immediately drew their swords and galloped towards St Peter's Field. One trooper, in a frantic attempt to catch up, knocked down a woman in Cooper Street, causing the death of her child when he was thrown from her arms; two-year-old William Fildes was the first casualty of Peterloo. Special constables were already present at the meeting, but no troops.

Sixty cavalrymen of the Manchester and Salford Yeomanry, led by Captain Hugh Hornby Birley, a local factory owner, arrived at the house from where the magistrates were watching; some reports allege that they were drunk. Andrews, the Chief Constable, instructed Birley that he had an arrest warrant which he needed assistance to execute. Birley was asked to take his cavalry to the hustings to allow the speakers to be removed; it was by then about 1:40 pm. Major Trafford himself appears not to have been present for the disastrous attack on the assembled crowd that followed.

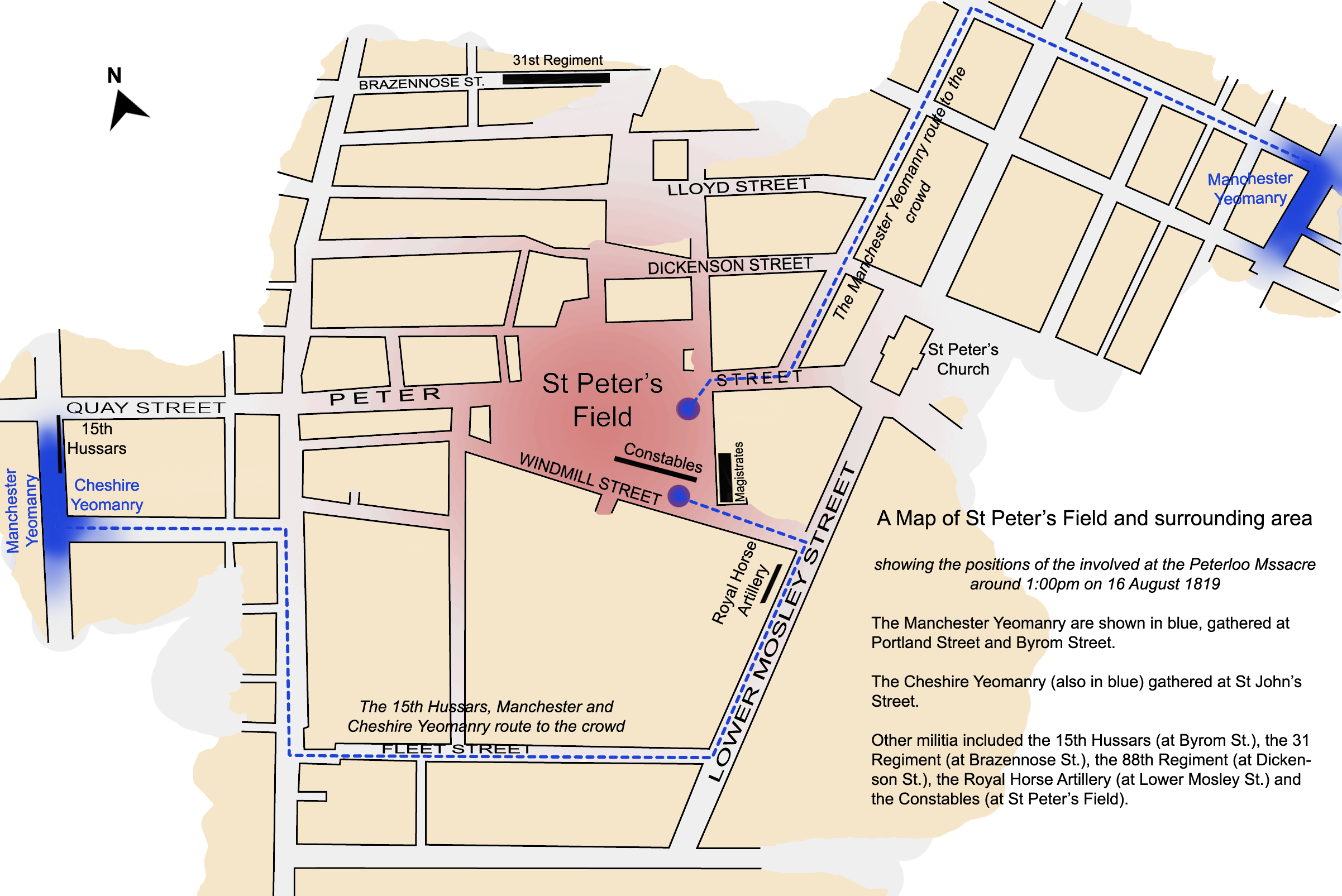
A map of St Peter's Field and surrounding area on 16 August 1819

The route towards the hustings between the special constables was narrow, and as the inexperienced horses were thrust further and further into the crowd they reared and plunged as people tried to get out of their way. The arrest warrant had been given to the Deputy Constable, Joseph Nadin, who followed behind the yeomanry. As the cavalry pushed towards the speakers' stand they became stuck in the crowd, and in panic started to hack about them with their sabres. On his arrival at the stand Nadin arrested Hunt, Johnson and a number of others including John Tyas, the reporter from The Times. According to Tyas the yeomanry's progress through the crowd had provoked a hail of bricks and stones, and caused them to lose "all command of temper". Their mission to execute the arrest warrant having been achieved, they then set about destroying the banners and flags carried by the crowd.

From his vantage point William Hulton perceived the unfolding events as an assault on the yeomanry, and on L'Estrange's arrival at 1:50 pm, at the head of his hussars, he ordered them into the field to disperse the crowd with the words: "Good God, Sir, don't you see they are attacking the Yeomanry; disperse the meeting!" The 15th Hussars formed themselves into a line stretching across the eastern end of St Peter's Field, and charged into the crowd. At about the same time the Cheshire Yeomanry charged from the southern edge of the field. At first the crowd had some difficulty in dispersing, as the main exit route into Peter Street was blocked by the 88th Infantry Regiment, standing with bayonets fixed. One officer of the 15th Hussars was heard trying to restrain the by now out of control Manchester and Salford Yeomanry, who were "cutting at every one they could reach": "For shame! For shame! Gentlemen: forbear, forbear! The people cannot get away!" Within ten minutes the crowd was dispersed, at the cost of at least 11 dead and over 600 injured.

== Aftermath and disbandment ==
The government and landowners viewed the yeomanry's actions at Peterloo as a courageous defence against insurrection. Following the massacre, on 27 August 1819, Lord Sidmouth sent a message of thanks from the Prince Regent to Major Trafford, among others. However, public horror at the actions of the yeomanry grew after the massacre. Major Trafford resigned his commission in 1820, and the yeomanry corps was disbanded on 9 June 1824.

== Bibliography ==
- Bruton, F. A., ed. (1921). Three Accounts of Peterloo by Eye-Witnesses. University of Manchester. pp. 86–87.
- Frow, Edmund & Ruth (1984). Radical Salford: Episodes in Labour History. Radcliffe: Neil Richardson. ISBN 0-907511-49-X.
- Marlow, Joyce (1969). The Peterloo Massacre. Rapp & Whiting. ISBN 0-85391-122-3.
- McPhillips, K. (1977). Oldham: The Formative Years. Neil Richardson. ISBN 1-85216-119-1.
- Poole, Robert (2006). "'By the Law or the Sword': Peterloo Revisited". History. 91 (302): 254–276. doi:10.1111/j.1468-229X.2006.00366.x.
- Read, Donald (1973). Peterloo: the "massacre" and its background. Manchester University Press. ISBN 0-678-06791-0.
- Reid, Robert (1989). The Peterloo Massacre. William Heinemann Ltd. ISBN 0-434-62901-4.
- Walmsley, Robert (1969). Peterloo: The Case Re-opened. Manchester University Press. ISBN 0-7190-0392-X.
