= Lord Raglan, Nangreaves =

Listed former pub in Greater Manchester, England

Lord Raglan
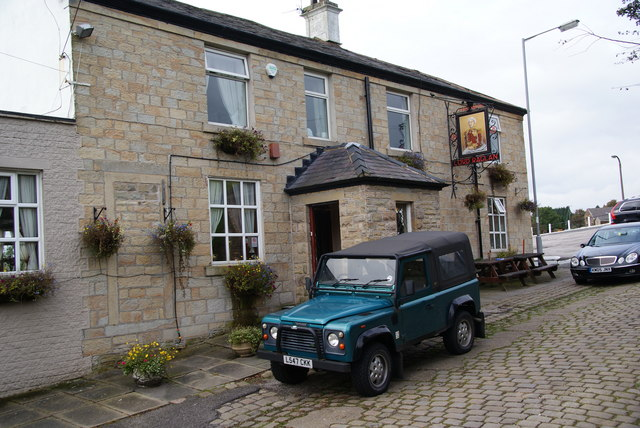
- The pub in 2009

- Location within Greater Manchester
- Alternative names: The Rag

General information
- Status: Converted into flats
- Type: Public house (former)
- Location: Mount Pleasant, Bury, Greater Manchester, England
- Coordinates: 53.6323°N 2.2893°W
- Year built: Late 19th century (probable)
- Closed: 2017

Design and construction
- Designations

Listed Building – Grade II
- Official name: Lord Raglan public house
- Designated: 29 April 1976
- Reference no.: 1318119

The Lord Raglan is a Grade II listed former public house on Mount Pleasant in Nangreaves, a village 2 miles (3.2 km) south-east of the town of Ramsbottom within the Metropolitan Borough of Bury, Greater Manchester, England. Probably built in the late 19th century, it operated for many years before closing in 2017. Plans to convert the building into flats were approved in 2025.

== History ==
The building was probably constructed in the late 19th century, according to its official listing. The site originally housed a butcher's shop that served people travelling the route between Manchester and Burnley. It was later converted into a public house and renamed the Lord Raglan in honour of FitzRoy Somerset, 1st Baron Raglan, the British commander during the Crimean War. The 1893 Ordnance Survey map marks the building as the Lord Raglan public house.

On 29 April 1976, the Lord Raglan was designated a Grade II listed building. The pub was run by the same family from 1954 and remained in their hands for more than six decades, before being sold ahead of the owner's retirement in 2017. Local residents formed a community group in an effort to save the pub, but their attempts to purchase the site were unsuccessful.

Following its closure in October 2017, plans to convert the pub into four flats and build six houses on its car park were rejected by Bury Council in 2022 on the grounds that the scheme would be "unduly obtrusive".

A subsequent application was lodged in March 2024 for the building to be converted into five flats, with the houses removed from the proposals. The plans were approved by the council in October 2025.

== Architecture ==
The building is finished in stone and has a simple stone cornice and chimney. A small square porch was added to the front. There are four windows, now fitted with updated glazing bars.

== See also ==
- Listed buildings in Ramsbottom
- Listed pubs in Greater Manchester
