= Listed buildings in Ramsbottom =

Ramsbottom is a town in the Metropolitan Borough of Bury, Greater Manchester, England, and includes the villages of Holcombe and Summerseat and the surrounding countryside. The area is unparished, and it contains 52 listed buildings that are recorded in the National Heritage List for England. Of these, one is listed at Grade II*, the middle grade, and the others are at Grade II, the lowest grade. The area is partly agricultural, partly industrial, and partly residential. The listed buildings include farmhouses and farm buildings, private houses and associated structures, churches and items in churchyards, a hotel, public houses, a hall, an engineering works and a mill, a former railway goods shed, a monument, and a telephone kiosk.

== Key ==
Grade	Criteria
II*	Particularly important buildings of more than special interest
II	Buildings of national importance and special interest

== Buildings ==
Name and location	Photograph	Date	Notes	Grade
Barn, Dry Gap Farm; 53.65792°N 2.29499°W		16th to 17th century	The barn is in stone with quoins, and contains three cruck trusses. It has an aisle extending partly down the west side. The openings include two cart entrances, doorways and windows.	II
Barn, Hollingrove Farm; 53.63623°N 2.34749°W	—	16th or 17th century	A stone barn with a stone slab roof, and two large irregular crucks supporting the roof. The barn has a cart entrance on each side.	II
Hey House; 53.63927°N 2.33900°W		c. 1616	Originally a hunting lodge, with wings added in the 17th century, it has since been divided into two dwellings. The house is in stone, and consists of an H-house with an extension at each end, and has two storeys. The ground floor windows are mullioned and transomed, on the upper floor they are mullioned, and all have hood moulds. At the top of the house are ball and obelisk finials and an embattled parapet. Much of the furniture and internal fittings came from Whalley Abbey.	II*
29 Summerseat Lane; 53.63271°N 2.33316°W	—	17th century	A stone house with two storeys and two bays. The windows were originally mullioned, but in the front the mullions have been removed. In the left gable end is a doorway, a mullioned window, and a horizontally-sliding sash window.	II
4 and 5 Croichley Fold Cottages; 53.62841°N 2.35371°W	—	Late 17th century	Originally a farmhouse containing some earlier material, it was altered in the 18th and the late 19th centuries, and has been divided into two dwellings. Basically cruck-framed, the building is in sandstone and has a roof mainly of Welsh slate. There are two storeys, four bays, a single-storey extension, and a small rear outshut. On the front are a lean-to porch and a gabled porch. Most of the windows are mullioned, some with hood moulds, and there are some casement windows.	II
Former farmhouse, Hollingrove Farm; 53.63631°N 2.34785°W	—	Late 17th century (probable)	The farmhouse is in stone with a stone slab roof. It has two storeys, and contains mullioned windows.	II
1 and 3 Alba Street; 53.64573°N 2.33148°W	—	17th or early 18th century	A pair of stone houses with a stone slab roof. There are two storeys at the front and one at front facing the road, with extensions of one and two storeys. Some windows are mullioned, and others are casements.	II
Sundial Cottage, Simons Farm; 53.64017°N 2.35192°W	—	c. 1700	The cottage is in stone with a concrete tile roof. There are two storeys, two bays, a rear outshut, and a barn added to the left gable end. The doorway in the right gable end has a monolith lintel. The windows are mullioned casements, and between the upper floor windows are the remains of a sundial. In the barn is a cart entrance.	II
Peel Hall; 53.62781°N 2.32044°W		1706	A wing was added at right angles to the original range in 1759. The house is in stone and has a roof with coped gables, and two storeys. Above the doorway in the older part is a dated and initialled panel over a shaped lintel. The windows in both parts are mullioned, and some have hood moulds.	II
Bast House; 53.63372°N 2.29742°W	—	Early 18th century	A stone house with some brick and a slate roof. There are two storeys, two bays, and a rear wing. Some of the windows are mullioned, some are round-headed, and some have hood moulds.	II
Higher House; 53.64619°N 2.33152°W		Early 18th century	Originally a public house, later a private house, it is in stone with quoins, 2 1/2 storeys, and the main part has a symmetrical front. In the centre is an embattled porch, and the doorway has a moulded architrave and a pulvinated frieze. The windows are mullioned and transomed with hood moulds, and the window above the porch has a round head with a keystone and impost mouldings. On the roof are five dormers with hipped roofs and casement windows. To the right is a slightly lower two-storey extension, and to the right of that another lower extension.	II
Mill House and Mill Yard House; 53.63108°N 2.28947°W		Early 18th century	A pair of stone houses with quoins and a slate roof. There are three storeys and basements, and each house has two bays. The windows in the basement are mullioned, and above they have been replaced with casement windows. The doorways have stone surrounds and moulded cornices, and above the doorway of the right house is a fanlight.	II
Higher Fold Cottage; 53.65247°N 2.30316°W	—	1732	A stone house with a stone slab roof and two storeys. It has three bays, the right bay projecting forward under a gable, forming a cross-wing, with flush quoins. On the front is a gabled porch with a Tudor arched entrance, above the porch is a decorated, initialled and dated panel, and the windows are mullioned, some with hood moulds.	II
Plant Farmhouse; 53.64470°N 2.33279°W	—	1739	The farmhouse was extended to the left in 1793. Both parts are in stone with quoins, a stone slab roof, and two storeys, and each part has two bays. The windows are mullioned, some with hood moulds, and at the rear is a transomed stair window. The doorway in the original part has a large inscribed lintel, and the later part has a datestone.	II
5 Cross Lane; 53.64523°N 2.33232°W	—	18th century	A stone cottage with quoins and a wooden gutter on corbels. There are two storeys and two bays. The windows are mullioned with hood moulds on the ground floor, and the doorway has a flush surround.	II
24 and 26 Alba Street; 53.64579°N 2.33171°W	—	18th century	A pair of house at the end of a terrace, they are in stone and have three storeys. The windows are mullioned, and the doorways have flush surrounds.	II
Barns, Lumb Carr Farm; 53.63514°N 2.33413°W	—	18th century (probable)	The barns are in stone and are in two sections. In the left part is a segmental-headed cart entrance, and the right part has a gable facing the road. (Note: Street View in August 2016 shows that the barns have been converted for residential use.)	II
Lumb Carr Farmhouse; 53.63516°N 2.33437°W	—	18th century (probable)	The farmhouse is in stone, and has two storeys and two bays. The windows are mullioned, and there are two doorways.	II
Sundial; 53.64657°N 2.32837°W	—	1753	The sundial is in the churchyard of Emmanuel Church. It is in stone, and consists of an octagonal pier on a large plinth with three steps on one side. It has a square top inscribed with the date and initials, and a metal dial.	II
1 Summerseat Lane; 53.63269°N 2.33304°W	—	1762	The house incorporates material from a 17th-century house. It is in stone with moulded eaves, a gutter cornice, a pulvinated frieze, and two storeys. There is a 19th-century bay window in the right bay, and the other windows are mullioned. In the centre is a doorway with a moulded surround and a cornice.	II
Shoulder of Mutton public house 53.64583°N 2.33136°W		Late 18th century	The public house is in ashlar stone with quoins, a slate roof, three storeys, and a symmetrical front of three bays. The central doorway has pilasters, a fanlight, and an open pediment. On the lower two floors are sash windows, and on the top floor the windows are casements. The roof has two spans, with a parapet between the gables.	II
Barwood House; 53.64475°N 2.31770°W		c. 1780	A house, later divided into three dwellings, it is in sandstone with a hipped slate roof. There are two storeys, a symmetrical front of five bays, and a right return also of five bays. In the centre is a porch with two columns and a doorway with a segmental head, and above are sash windows.	II
Grant Arms Hotel; 53.64919°N 2.31873°W		c. 1807	The hotel is in stone with a slate roof. The front is symmetrical with three storeys, five bays, sill bands, and quoins. In the centre is a doorway with Tuscan half-columns, the windows are sashes, and there is a clock in the centre of the top floor. At the rear is an older wing that has an arched doorway with imposts.	II
Nuttall Hall Cottages; 53.64279°N 2.30904°W		1817	Originally the coach house and stables of Nuttall Hall, now demolished, the building is in stone with a sill band, and an eaves cornice. There are two storeys and six bays, the outer bays recessed. The central two bays project slightly further, and contain a rectangular bay window on the ground floor, a roundel on the upper floor, and at the top is a pediment containing a carved cartouche. In the second and fifth bays are arched doorways with quoined surrounds, and the doorway in the sixth bay has a pediment. The windows are sashes.	II
1–6 Mount Pleasant; 53.63132°N 2.29051°W	—	Early 19th century	A row of six cottages with two storeys, and each cottage has one bay. Above the doors are square fanlights, and the windows are replacements.	II
8–10 Mount Pleasant; 53.63191°N 2.28942°W	—	Early 19th century	A row of three stone cottages with a slate roof. They have two storeys and each cottage has one bay.	II
10–16 Ramsbottom Lane; 53.64902°N 2.31805°W	—	Early 19th century	A terrace of four stone shops with a gutter cornice and two storeys. The windows on the upper floor vary; some are sashes, and some have been replaced. On the ground floor are differing shop fronts. Nos. 10 and 12 have pilasters and dentilled cornices, No. 14 has fluted 3/4 Doric columns, a cornice, and a shop window with arched lights, and No. 16 has a bow window.	II
11 and 12 Mount Pleasant; 53.63209°N 2.28935°W	—	First half of 19th century	A pair of stone cottages with two storeys and cellars. Each cottage has one bay. In the cellars are mullioned windows, and the windows above have been replaced.	II
13–28 Mount Pleasant; 53.63216°N 2.29017°W	—	Early 19th century	A row of 16 stone cottages with two storeys and one bay. The windows have stone sills, and the doorways have architraves. Two of the cottages have inserted bow windows. In front of the cottages is stone paving and stone setts.	II
30–34 Mount Pleasant; 53.63197°N 2.29071°W	—	Early 19th century	A row of stone cottages with stone eaves, two storeys, and one bay to each house. The windows and doors have been replaced.	II
Manor House and outbuilding 53.64389°N 2.33384°W		Early 19th century	A stone house with quoins, a gutter cornice, and a slate roof. There are three storeys and a basement, and a symmetrical front of three bays. The central doorway has impost blocks, a keystone, a moulded arch and a fanlight. There are stone steps leading up to each side of the door, with iron railings. To the left is an outbuilding, setback and with a large circular opening.	II
Barn, Plant Farm; 53.64448°N 2.33270°W	—	1828	A stone barn with a stone flagged roof, it has symmetrical fronts. In both fronts are central cart entrances with segmental heads, and on the front facing the road are two circular pitching holes.	II
St Andrew's Church; 53.64271°N 2.32047°W		1834	Originally a Presbyterian church, later Anglican, it is in gritstone with a Welsh slate roof. The church consists of a nave, a polygonal apse, and a west tower flanked by lean-to porches containing entrances to the gallery. The tower has two stages, octagonal buttresses, clock faces, and corbelled-out corner pinnacles with stepped pyramidal caps, and with an embattled parapet between them. The bays of the nave are divided by buttresses, and contain lancet windows, and at the corners of the nave are octagonal buttresses rising to pinnacles with foliage capitals. Inside the church is a west gallery.	II
Summerseat House; 53.62906°N 2.32236°W		1836	A large rendered house with a dentilled eaves cornice, a blocking course, and a hipped slate roof. There are two storeys, a symmetrical front of five bays, and a single-storey extension to the left. In the centre of the front is a portico with Tuscan columns and an entablature, and above the door is a fanlight.	II
2–8 Market Place and 59 Bridge Street; 53.64885°N 2.31826°W	—	c. 1840	A terrace of shops on a corner site, in ashlar stone, with three storeys. There are three bays on Market Place, one on Bridge Street, and a curved bay on the corner. On the ground floor are shop fronts, and on the upper floors are sash windows. Framing the shop windows and doors are cornices and pilasters.	II
7 and 8 Market Place; 53.64905°N 2.31895°W	—	c. 1840	A pair of stone shops with sill bands, an eaves cornice, and corner pilasters. There are three storeys, and each shop has two bays. On the ground floor are 20th-century shop fronts, and above are sash windows.	II
50–58 Bridge Street; 53.64830°N 2.31706°W	—	c. 1840	A row of stone shops with quoins, an eaves cornice and a blocking course. There are three storeys and twelve bays. On the ground floor are shop fronts, and above are sash windows in architraves, those on the middle floor having cornice hoods.	II
Hazelhurst Engineering Works; 53.63727°N 2.32977°W		c. 1840	This was built to accommodate hand-loom weavers under one roof. It is in stone with three storeys, and on the top floor is a continuous band of 23 weavers' windows that are mullioned and transomed. On the middle floor are similar windows, not in a band, and sash windows. On the ground floor, from the left, are a doorway, two mullioned windows, an archway with a segmental head and a keystone, and two sash windows flanking a doorway. In the right bays are two doorways with canted bay windows to the right.	II
Former railway goods shed 53.62757°N 2.31251°W		1847	The goods shed was built by the East Lancashire Railway Company. It is in sandstone with a grey slate roof, and has a rectangular plan, a single storey, and four bays. The east side is built into an embankment. There are entrances in the north and south gable ends, and along the west side are four windows; all the windows have semicircular heads formed from voussoirs. The doorway at the south end has rusticated quoins.	II
St Paul's Church; 53.64852°N 2.31624°W		1847–1850	This was a Commissioners' church, it is in Early English style, and the aisle was added in 1866. It consists of a nave, a south porch, a north aisle, a chancel, a vestry, and a west steeple. The steeple consists of a tower and a recessed spire, and the windows in the church are lancets.	II
Council Chambers; 53.64923°N 2.31824°W		c. 1850 (probable)	A stone building on a corner site with sill bands, quoins, an eaves cornice, and a blocking course. There are three storeys, six bays on the front, four bays on Market Street, and a curved bay on the corner. The windows are sashes. In the corner bay, the ground floor window has a bracketed cornice, the window on the middle floor has a bracketed pediment, and the ground floor windows adjacent to the corner also have bracketed pediments. On the front is a carriage entry with a depressed arch.	II
Peel Monument; 53.64342°N 2.33796°W		1851–52	The monument commemorating Sir Robert Peel stands near the top of Holcombe Hill. It is in stone with a square plan, and is 120 feet (37 m) tall. It consists of a slightly tapering chimney-like tower, with a corbelled and embattled parapet. The tower stands on a single-storey base, also with an embattled parapet. There are small mullioned windows in the base and the tower.	II
Emmanuel Church; 53.64661°N 2.32838°W		1852–53	The stone church is in Gothic Revival style. It consists of a nave with a clerestory, north and south lean-to aisles, a north transept, a narrow chancel, and a west steeple. The steeple has angle buttresses, and a broach spire with three tiers of alternating lucarnes.	II
School House; 53.64445°N 2.32510°W		c. 1864	The house is in stone and has corbels under the eaves, two storeys and two bays. Much of the material used in its construction came from two other buildings, Manchester Parish Church, which was being restored, and Holcombe courthouse, which was being demolished. Features include the main doorway with its gable hood and lintel dated 1664, mullioned windows with hood moulds, carved cross-keys and a datestone dated 1414, and a gargoyle at the apex of the gable. On the right side is a central plain porch and a mullioned window.	II
Christ Church Chapel; 53.64909°N 2.31777°W		1874	A former Methodist chapel in Italianate style, built in ashlar stone with sill bands, an eaves cornice, and two storeys. There are four bays, the outer bays projecting forward and pedimented. In the central bays, steps lead up to two round-headed doorways with rusticated pilasters and an entablature with keystones. On the upper floor are round-headed windows, and at the top is an upstand. The outer bays have corner pilasters, a round-headed window in each floor, and a frieze of panels between them.	II
Brooksbottom Mill; 53.63224°N 2.31252°W		1874–1876	A cotton spinning mill on a site first developed by Robert Peel in 1773. It is in stone with a hipped slate roof, and is in Italianate style. The mill has an L-shaped plan, with four storeys, and a two-storey extension added in 1890. The windows on the upper two storeys have round heads and impost bands, and there is a large arched window with pilasters facing the river.	II
Co-operative Hall; 53.64722°N 2.31856°W		1874–1876	The building, containing an entertainment hall, offices and shops, is in sandstone with a slate roof. It is on a sloping site, and has three storeys at the front, at the rear are five storeys, a basement and a lower basement, and the front has five bays. On the ground floor are two modern shop fronts, and on the left is a round-headed doorway with a moulded surround, a fanlight, and a triangular pediment with a moulded console on the left. The middle floor contains rectangular windows with pedimented lintels, on the top floor the windows are round headed with moulded surrounds, and above each window is a moulded band and a roundel. Inside the top floor is a hall with galleries on three sides.	II
35–40 Mount Pleasant; 53.63232°N 2.29237°W	—	Second half of 19th century	A row of six stone cottages. They have two storeys, and each cottage has one bay.	II
41–50 Mount Pleasant; 53.63229°N 2.29309°W	—	Second half of 19th century	A row of ten stone cottages with two storeys, and each cottage has one bay. The windows are altered sashes.	II
Lord Raglan public house 53.63227°N 2.28932°W		Late 19th century (probable)	The public house is in stone with a moulded cornice. There are two storeys and four bays. On the front is a square porch, and the windows have been replaced.	II
Telephone kiosk 53.64920°N 2.31813°W	—	1935	A K6 type telephone kiosk, designed by Giles Gilbert Scott. Constructed in cast iron with a square plan and a dome, it has three unperforated crowns in the top panels.	II
War memorial 53.64832°N 2.31612°W		1950	The war memorial stands in the churchyard of St Paul's Church. It is in Portland stone on a podium of Yorkshire stone. The memorial consists of a Latin cross on a square pedestal and plinth on a circular podium. On the front of the cross is a metal sword in its scabbard, painted black. On the front of the memorial is an inscription relating to both World Wars.	II

== Notes and references ==
=== Sources ===
- Historic England, "Barn at Dry Gap Farm, Ramsbottom (1391690)", National Heritage List for England
- Historic England, "Barn with cruck frames on south side of yard at Hollingrove Farm, Ramsbottom (1356813)", National Heritage List for England
- Historic England, "No. 1 and 3 Alba Street, Ramsbottom (1356788)", National Heritage List for England
- Historic England, "No. 29 Summerseat Lane, Ramsbottom (1163921)", National Heritage List for England
- Historic England, "Hey House, Ramsbottom (1067269)", National Heritage List for England
- Historic England, "Nos. 4 and 5 Croichley Fold Cottages, Ramsbottom (1067283)", National Heritage List for England
- Historic England, "Former farmhouse on south-west side of yard at Hollingrove Farm, Ramsbottom (1163740)", National Heritage List for England
- Historic England, "Sundial Cottage Simons Farm, Ramsbottom (1067229)", National Heritage List for England
- Historic England, "Peel Hall, Summerseat (1163712)", National Heritage List for England
- Historic England, "Bast House, Summerseat (1317959)", National Heritage List for England
- Historic England, "Higher House, Ramsbottom (1356810)", National Heritage List for England
- Historic England, "Mill House and Mill Yard House, Nangreaves (1067242)", National Heritage List for England
- Historic England, "Higher Fold Cottage, Ramsbottom (1067267)", National Heritage List for England
- Historic England, "Plant Farmhouse, Ramsbottom (1318228)", National Heritage List for England
- Historic England, "No. 24 and 26 Alba Street, Ramsbottom (1067277)", National Heritage List for England
- Historic England, "No. 5 Cross Lane, Ramsbottom (1067262)", National Heritage List for England
- Historic England, "Lumb Carr Farmhouse, Ramsbottom (1318230)", National Heritage List for England
- Historic England, "Range of barns abutting Lumb Carr Farmhouse on east, Ramsbottom (1067271)", National Heritage List for England
- Historic England, "Sundial adjacent to Emmanuel Church on south side, Ramsbottom (1356794)", National Heritage List for England
- Historic England, "No. 1 Summerseat Lane, Ramsbottom (1067221)", National Heritage List for England
- Historic England, "Shoulder of Mutton public house, Ramsbottom (1067276)", National Heritage List for England
- Historic England, "Barwood House, Ramsbottom (1356819)", National Heritage List for England
- Historic England, "Grant Arms Hotel, Ramsbottom (1318181)", National Heritage List for England
- Historic England, "Nuttall Hall Cottages, Ramsbottom (1067247)", National Heritage List for England
- Historic England, "Nos. 1 to 6 Mount Pleasant, Nangreaves (1163663)", National Heritage List for England
- Historic England, "Nos. 8 to 10 Mount Pleasant, Nangreaves (1067243)", National Heritage List for England
- Historic England, "Nos. 11 and 12 Mount Pleasant, Nangreaves (1163674)", National Heritage List for England
- Historic England, "Nos. 13 to 28 Mount Pleasant, Nangreaves (1067244)", National Heritage List for England
- Historic England, "Nos. 33 to 34 Mount Pleasant, Nangreaves (1318115)", National Heritage List for England
- Historic England, "Nos. 10 to 16 Ramsbottom Lane, Ramsbottom (1318188)", National Heritage List for England
- Historic England, "Manor House and outbuilding abutting to the south, Ramsbottom (1309235)", National Heritage List for England
- Historic England, "Barn 11 metres south of Plant Farmhouse, Ramsbottom (1067272)", National Heritage List for England
- Historic England, "Church of St Andrew, Ramsbottom (1250813)", National Heritage List for England
- Historic England, "Summerseat House, Ramsbottom (1067246)", National Heritage List for England
- Historic England, "Nos. 50 to 58 Bridge Street, Ramsbottom (1162977)", National Heritage List for England
- Historic England, "Nos. 2 to 8 Market Place and No. 59 Bridge Street, Ramsbottom (1067237)", National Heritage List for England
- Historic England, "Nos. 7 and 8 Market Place, Ramsbottom (1356808)", National Heritage List for England
- Historic England, "Hazelhurst Engineering Works with Nos. 258 to 264 Bolton Road West, Ramsbottom (1067284)", National Heritage List for England
- Historic England, "Former railway goods shed, Summerseat (1392323)", National Heritage List for England
- Historic England, "Church of St Paul, Ramsbottom (1163267)", National Heritage List for England
- Historic England, "Council Chambers, Ramsbottom (1067249)", National Heritage List for England
- Historic England, "Peel Monument, Ramsbottom (1163433)", National Heritage List for England
- Historic England, "Emmanuel Church, Ramsbottom (1163079)", National Heritage List for England
- Historic England, "School House, Ramsbottom (1067264)", National Heritage List for England
- Historic England, "Christ Church Chapel, Ramsbottom (1163733)", National Heritage List for England
- Historic England, "Brooksbottom Mill, Summerseat (1356822)", National Heritage List for England
- Historic England, "Ramsbottom Co-operative Hall, Ramsbottom (1473516)", National Heritage List for England
- Historic England, "Nos. 35 to 40 Mount Pleasant, Nangreaves (1356809)", National Heritage List for England
- Historic England, "Nos. 41 to 50 Mount Pleasant, Nangreaves (1067245)", National Heritage List for England
- Historic England, "Lord Raglan public house, Nangreaves (1318119)", National Heritage List for England
- Historic England, "K6 kiosk outside Civic Hall, Ramsbottom (1356842)", National Heritage List for England
- Historic England, "Ramsbottom War Memorial, Ramsbottom (1457403)", National Heritage List for England
- Historic England, Listed Buildings
- Hartwell, Clare; Hyde, Matthew; Pevsner, Nikolaus (2004), Lancashire: Manchester and the South-East, The Buildings of England, New Haven and London: Yale University Press, ISBN 0-300-10583-5
