= Shoulder of Mutton, Holcombe =

Listed pub in Greater Manchester, England

Shoulder of Mutton
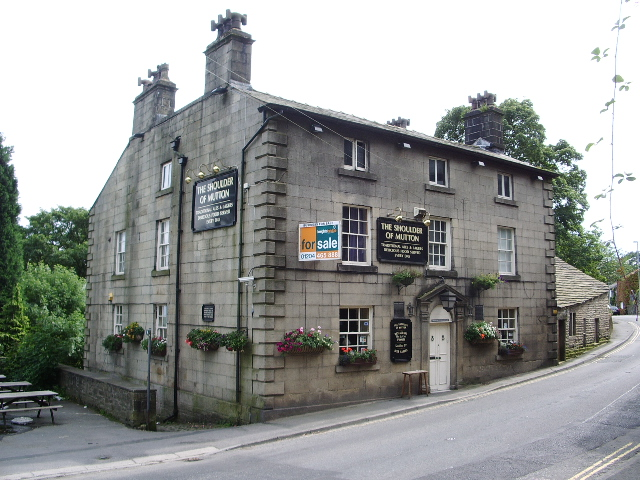
- The pub in 2007

- Location within Greater Manchester

General information
- Type: Public house
- Location: Holcombe Village, Holcombe, Greater Manchester, England
- Coordinates: 53.6458°N 2.3314°W
- Year built: Late 18th century
- Renovated: 2023

Design and construction
- Designations

Listed Building – Grade II
- Official name: Shoulder of Mutton public house
- Designated: 29 January 1985
- Reference no.: 1318119

Website
- somholcombe.co.uk

The Shoulder of Mutton is a Grade II listed public house on Holcombe Village (Note: The building's official listing gives its address as Alba Street, but its address is on Holcombe Village.) in Holcombe, a village within the Metropolitan Borough of Bury, Greater Manchester, England. Built in the late 18th century on the site of an earlier inn, it was damaged during an airship raid in 1916. The pub remains a longstanding village landmark, reopening in 2023 after a brief closure.

== History ==
The building was constructed in the late 18th century and was likely a rebuilding or substantial alteration of an earlier inn, according to its official listing. A datestone marked "1751" suggests that the structure may have been built or rebuilt at that time. The public house was historically associated with cockfighting, though there is no known evidence that the practice continued there after it was prohibited in 1835.

The 1910 Ordnance Survey map marks the building as the Shoulder of Mutton public house. During the evening of 25 September 1916, Holcombe was hit during one of the early aerial raids of the First World War. The airship L21 dropped five bombs on the village while heading towards Bolton. The post office and village school were damaged, as was the pub, where residents took shelter in the cellar.

On 29 January 1985, the Shoulder of Mutton was designated a Grade II listed building. The pub closed in 2022 and underwent unspecified works from May 2023, reopening in June 2023.

== Architecture ==
The building is constructed of dressed stone and has a symmetrical front. It has three storeys with three sash windows; the top-floor windows are casements but were likely sashes originally. The entrance contains a four‑panel door with a concealed fanlight and a small pediment supported by pilasters. The corners are marked with stone blocks. The roof has two pitches, finished in slate, with a parapet between the gable-end chimneys. Nos. 1 and 3 Alba Street, also Grade II listed, adjoin the pub on the right.

The interior includes original Crown Brewery tiling in the porch.

== See also ==
- Listed buildings in Ramsbottom
- Listed pubs in Greater Manchester

== Bibliography ==
- Smith, Peter J. C. (1991), Zeppelins over Lancashire, Neil Richardson, ISBN 1-85216-066-7
