= Sir Humphrey de Trafford, 3rd Baronet =

English landowner and racehorse breeder

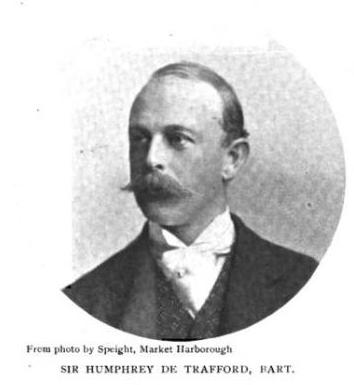
Among Sir Humphrey's interests was dog breeding. This portrait was printed in the 1902 book Dog Shows and Doggy People.

Sir Humphrey Francis de Trafford (3 July 1862 – 10 January 1929) was an English landowner and racehorse breeder. He was the son of Sir Humphrey de Trafford, 2nd Baronet and Lady Annette Mary Talbot.

On the death of his father on 4 May 1886, Humphrey became the 3rd Baronet de Trafford. Later the same year, on 9 August, he married Violet Alice Maud Franklin, daughter of James Franklin. They had four children:

- Humphrey Edmund, born 30 November 1891, who became the Fourth Baronet. He died without male issue on 6 October 1971.
- Violet Mary, born 8 May 1893, she married first to Captain Rupert OD Keppel in 1919, this marriage was annulled in 1921, she then married Colonel Keith Graham Menzies in 1922. She died on 28 February 1968.
- Rudolph Edgar Francis, born 31 August 1894, who became the Fifth Baronet in 1971 upon the death of his elder brother Humphrey. He died in 1983
- Raymond Vincent, born 28 January 1900, in the 1920s was part of the 'Happy Valley' party set in Kenya. He later married Alice de Janzé (née Silverthorne), who had previously shot him and then herself at Gare du Nord rail station in Paris, in 1932; they divorced in 1938. Raymond then married Eve Drummond in 1951. He died on 14 May 1971.

In 1896, Sir Humphrey put the family estate of Trafford Park up for sale. The auction was held on 7 May 1896 in the Grand Hotel, Manchester. The estate was described in the sale catalogue as comprising a "distinguished family mansion of imposing elevation, built in the Italian style, seated in a beautifully timbered deer park". However it failed to reach its reported reserve price of £300,000. There was much public debate, before and after the abortive sale, as to whether Manchester Corporation ought to buy Trafford Park. But it could not agree terms quickly enough, and so, on 23 June 1896, Ernest Terah Hooley became the new owner of Trafford Park, for the sum of £360,000. Following the sale of Trafford Park, Sir Humphrey moved to Hill Crest, Market Harborough.

Sir Humphrey served as an officer of the Lancashire Hussars Imperial Yeomanry, and was promoted Major 1 July 1901.

In 1903 he served as president of the Royal Lancashire Agricultural Society and in 1905, he published Foxhounds of Great Britain and Ireland and their Masters and Huntsmen.

In July 1907, Sir Humphrey de Trafford caused scandal in European society circles when he was taken to court for bankruptcy despite claiming an annual income of $240,000.

Lady de Trafford died on 20 July 1925. Sir Humphrey died four years later on 10 January 1929, aged 66.

Correspondence and government accounts related to death duties payable on Sir Humphrey's estate are held by The National Archives, but remained sealed under a Lord Chancellor's Instrument until 2006.

Baronetage of the United Kingdom
Preceded by Humphrey de Trafford	Baronet (of Trafford Park); 1886–1929	Succeeded by Humphrey Edmund de Trafford
