= Charles de Trafford =

English cricketer and aristocrat

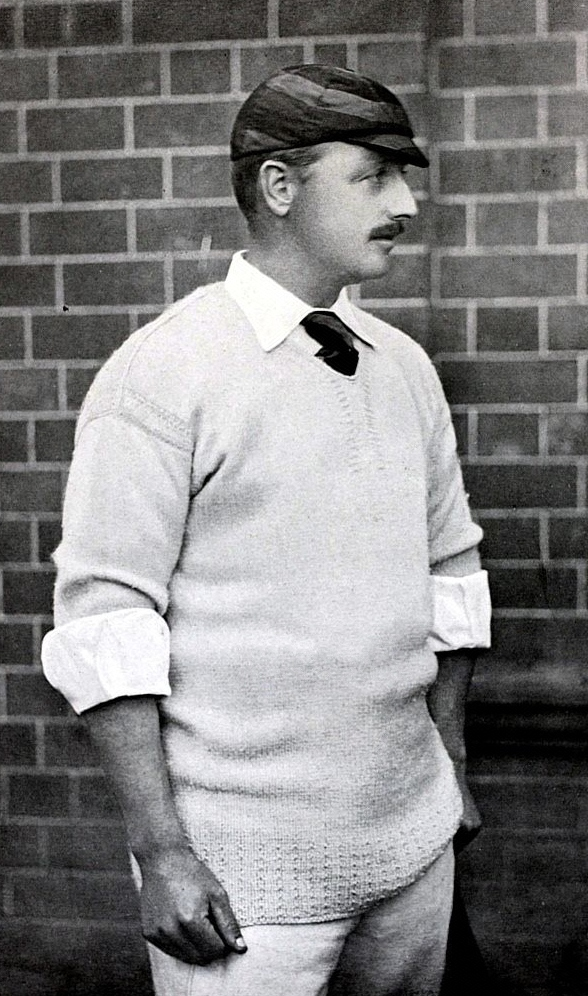

Personal information
- Full name: Charles Edmund de Trafford
- Born: 21 May 1864; Trafford Park, Stretford, England
- Died: 11 November 1951 (aged 87); Rothley, Leicestershire, England
- Batting: Right-handed
- Role: Batsman, captain
- Relatives: Sir Humphrey de Trafford (father); Sir Tim O'Brien (brother-in-law)

Domestic team information
- Years: Team
- 1884: Lancashire County Cricket Club
- 1885–1911/12: Marylebone Cricket Club
- 1894–1920: Leicestershire County Cricket Club

Career statistics
Competition	FC
Matches	292
Runs scored	9581
Batting average	18.67
100s/50s	6/36
Top score	137
Balls bowled	70
Wickets	2
Bowling average	47.50
5 wickets in innings	–
10 wickets in match	–
Best bowling	2/47
Catches/stumpings	98/0
- Source: Cricinfo, 10 November 2009

Charles Edmund de Trafford (21 May 1864 – 11 November 1951) was an English aristocrat and a first-class cricketer.

== Early life ==
Charles de Trafford was born at Trafford Hall, Trafford Park, Stretford, the second son of Sir Humphrey de Trafford, 2nd Baronet and his wife Lady Annette Talbot. His father owned Old Trafford Cricket Ground. Charles was educated at Beaumont College.

== Cricket ==
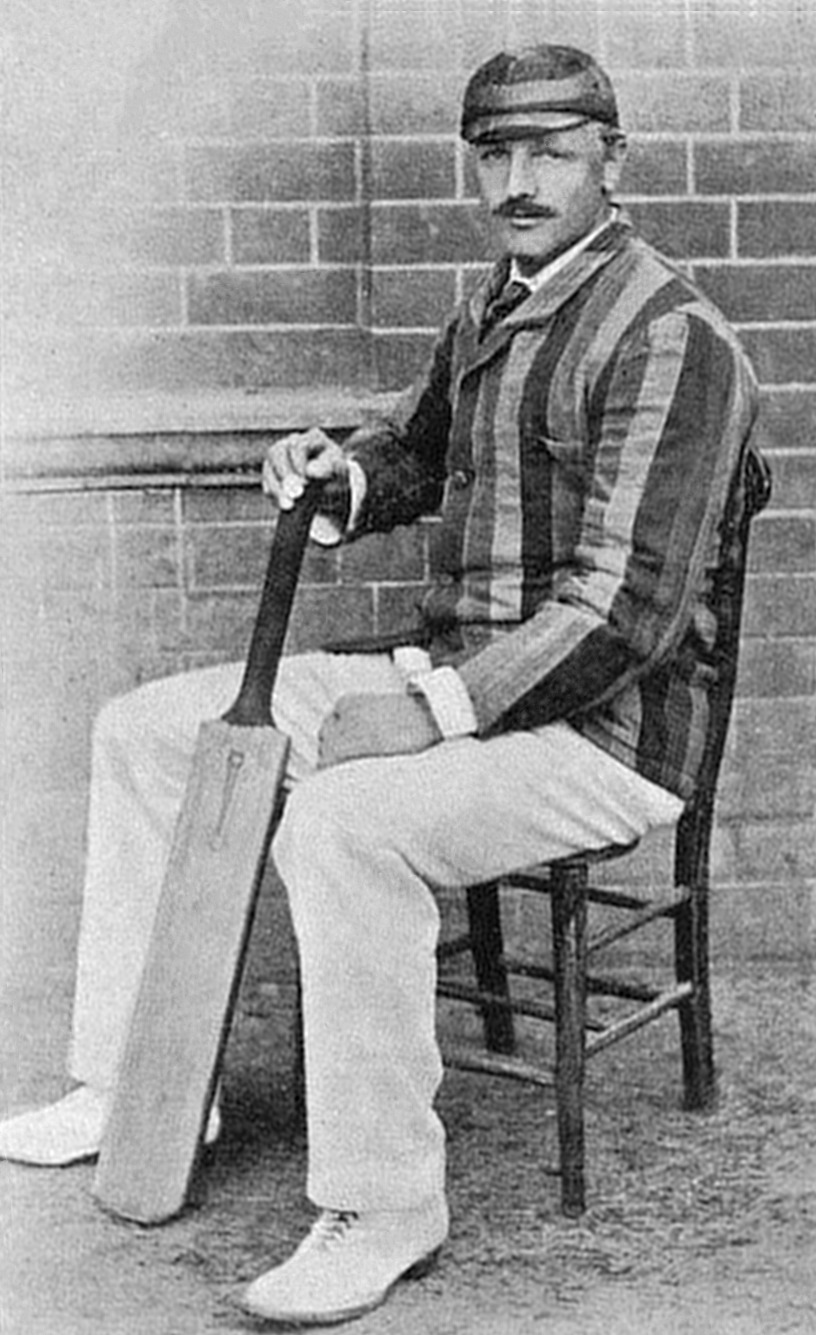
Charles de Trafford

In 1884, at age 20, de Trafford joined the Lancashire County Cricket Club. He soon became known as a skilled cricketer and in 1885 joined Marylebone Cricket Club (MCC). In 1894 he moved to Leicestershire County Cricket Club as captain, a position in which he remained for 13 seasons. He is largely credited with making Leicestershire into a first-class club.

A man of great physical strength, de Trafford was an opening batsman and a big hitter who liked to attack from the first ball. He never wore batting gloves. For Leicestershire against the Australians in 1905, he made all the first 56 runs of the innings himself, and was out for 63 after a first-wicket partnership of 69, when his partner was 2 not out.

He captained MCC on the tour of New Zealand in 1906-07 after the original captain, Teddy Wynyard, returned home injured after the second match.

He made his highest first-class score in 1913 for Leicestershire against Derbyshire when he was 49 years old. After Leicestershire had been 11 for four on the first morning, he hit 137 in 120 minutes, and Leicestershire made 351 off 71 overs and went on to win by an innings on the second day.

== Personal life ==
In 1881, his father, Sir Humphrey de Trafford purchased the Hothorpe Hall Estate in Northamptonshire (though near Theddingworth, Leicestershire), from the Cook family and presented it to Charles. During his time at Hothorpe, Charles de Trafford extended the Georgian Manor House and in 1892 built a Catholic Chapel there in memory of his brother Gilbert who had died in 1890.

On 15 October 1892, he married Lady Agnes Feilding, the daughter of Rudolph Feilding, 8th Earl of Denbigh. Their son Edmund Hubert de Trafford served with distinction in World War I, married the Hon. Cecilia Strickland and later emigrated to Malta. Edmund and Cecilia's daughter Elizabeth returned to England and married Admiral Arthur Francis Turner.

In 1893, de Trafford served as High Sheriff of Leicestershire and also as a Justice of the Peace. Lady Agnes died in 1921, and Charles continue to live at Hothorpe until 1928, when he moved to Sibbertoft. He died at Rothley on 11 November 1951, aged 87.

Honorary titles
Preceded by William Henry Ellis	High Sheriff of Leicestershire; 1893	Succeeded by Edmund Turnor
