= Rudolph de Trafford =

British aristocrat and banker

Sir Rudolph de Trafford Bt OBE
- Born: 31 August 1894; St George Hanover Square, London, England
- Died: 16 August 1983 (aged 88); London, England
- Education: Trinity College, Cambridge (BA; 1915)
- Occupation: Banker
- Spouses: June Isabel Chaplin (m. 1924; div. 1938) Katherine Lo Savio Balke (m. 1939)
- Children: Sir Dermot de Trafford

Sir Rudolph Edgar Francis de Trafford, 5th Baronet, OBE (31 August 1894 – 16 August 1983) was a British aristocrat and banker who succeeded his brother in the de Trafford baronetcy at the age of 77.

Rudolph was the second son of Sir Humphrey de Trafford, 3rd Baronet and Violet Alice Maud Franklin. He attended Downside (Sep 1907 to Jul 1911), and Trinity College, Cambridge, where he was friends with Marshall Field III. After graduating with a BA in 1915, he fought in the First World War, being twice mentioned in despatches. In 1919, Rudolph joined Marshall Field in California for a vacation with Field's wife and children on Catalina Island.

== Career ==
By 1931, Rudolph was working in London for the Boston investment bank Lee, Higginson & Co., which had also employed Marshall Field III. Although the bank collapsed in the Swedish match scandal in 1932, Rudolph continued to work for reformed company. In his capacity as the senior director in Europe of Higginson and Co, he negotiated at least two unsuccessful attempts at merger with the British investment house Kleinwort Benson in 1936 and 1938.

== Family ==
Rudolph married June Isabel Chaplin, daughter of Lieutenant-Colonel Reginald Chaplin (son of John Worthy Chaplin VC), at St James's, Spanish Place on 6 February 1924. The reception was held at Seaford House, which was lent to the couple by Lord and Lady Howard de Walden and they honeymooned in Egypt. Their only son, Dermot, was born on 19 January 1925.

In 1936, he and June had leased the Loder Dower House, at Cowfold, Sussex. Then in April 1938, after 14 years of marriage, June de Trafford petitioned for divorce on the grounds of Rudolph's adultery in a London hotel in November 1937. The case was uncontested, and the courts granted June a decree nisi along with custody of their son. In 1952, June remarried to Thomas Touchet-Jesson and became Lady Audley. They divorced in 1957, and June died in 1977.

Rudolph also remarried on 2 February 1939 to Katherine 'Kay' Lo Savio Balke the daughter of W.W. Balke of Cincinnati, Ohio. He continued to work as a City of London banker, later being appointed director of the Royal Exchange. In 1971, when his elder brother Sir Humphrey de Trafford died with no male heirs, Rudolph succeeded him in the de Trafford baronetcy.

Rudolph de Trafford died on 16 August 1983, at age 88, at his home in Eaton Square, London. His requiem mass was celebrated at St Mary's, Cadogan Street. Kay de Trafford died on 15 September 1993.

Baronetage of the United Kingdom
Preceded by Humphrey de Trafford	Baronet (of Trafford Park); 1971–1983	Succeeded by Dermot de Trafford
