= John de Trafford =

British businessman and banker (born 1950)

Sir John Humphrey de Trafford, 7th Baronet, MBE (born 12 September 1950) is a British businessman and banker. He is the oldest son of Sir Dermot de Trafford, 6th Baronet and his first wife Patricia Mary Beeley. He succeeded to the de Trafford Baronetcy upon the death of his father in January 2010, and was appointed a Member of the Order of the British Empire (MBE) in the Queen's 2010 Birthday Honours.

Sir John was educated at Ampleforth College and Bristol University, graduating in 1971 with a BSc.

In 1975, Sir John married Anne Marie Faure de Pebeyre, daughter of Jacques Faure de Pebeyre, and they have brought up two children; Alexander Humphrey de Trafford (born 28 June 1978) and Isabel June de Trafford (born 28 February 1980).

In business, Sir John has served as Sales and Marketing Director for Thistle Hotels and held various positions within American Express, before becoming Regional President of the North Europe division in 2000. He also holds several non-executive directorships including with the Pension, Disability and Carers Service. Sir John became a non-executive director of the UK's state-owned National Savings and Investments (NS&I) in January 2010, and was appointed chairman on 4 January 2012 .

He is also a trustee of the Landmark Trust and of the National Benevolent Fund for the Aged.

Baronetage of the United Kingdom
Preceded by Dermot de Trafford	Baronet (of Trafford Park); 2010–present	Incumbent
