= Old Trafford (disambiguation) =

Old Trafford is the home of Manchester United F.C.

Old Trafford may also refer to:

- Old Trafford (area), a district of Trafford, England
- Old Trafford (ward), an electoral ward on Trafford Council
- Old Trafford Cricket Ground, home of Lancashire County Cricket Club
- Old Trafford Halt or Manchester United Football Ground railway station, a railway station with a direct connection to the football ground
- Old Trafford tram stop, a Metrolink stop adjacent to the cricket ground
- Naivasha Stadium or Old Trafford, in Naivasha, Kenya
- Old Trafford Medical Center, a hospital in St. George's, Grenada
