= Dermot de Trafford =

British banker, businessman and baronet (1925–2010)

Sir Dermot Humphrey de Trafford, 6th Baronet, VRD, FRSA (19 January 1925 – 22 January 2010) was a British banker, businessman and baronet. He was the son of Sir Rudolph de Trafford, 5th Baronet, and June Isabel Chaplin.

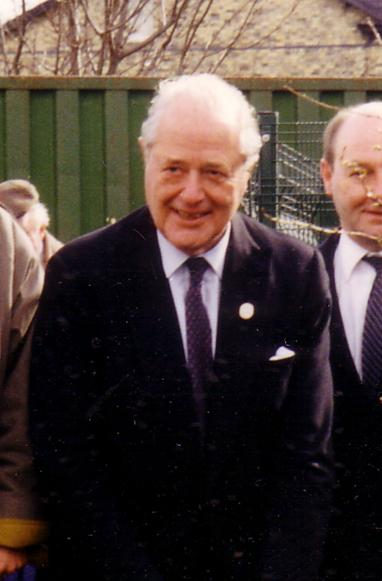
Sir Dermot de Trafford (1993)

== Early life and education ==
Dermot de Trafford was born at Marylebone in London, but grew up at the Loder Dower House, Cowfold, Sussex, which had been rented by his parents in 1936. He received his early education from his French governess, Genevieve Galopin, and at Egerton House Pre-Prep School in Dorset Square, London. In 1934 he went to study under the Benedictine Order of monks at the Worth Priory Prep School; but following an illness was sent to Switzerland to recuperate at Le Rosey on Lake Geneva.

In 1938, he returned to England to study Modern Languages at Harrow School for four years, while there he won the school Steeplechase, breaking the school record, he also won the school prizes for French and German in 1942. In 1942 he earned a scholarship to the School of Oriental and African Studies, University of London, where he studied Turkish, graduating in 1943. He was later invested as a Fellow of the Royal Society of Arts (FRSA).

== Naval career ==
In 1943, he joined the Royal Navy as a Probationary Temporary Midshipman, Special Branch, Special Service, Royal Naval Volunteer Reserve. He underwent basic training at Portsmouth Barracks and from there shipped out to Suez.

He served in Egypt and Turkey, where he became a 1st Class Interpreter attached to the Eastern Mediterranean Coastal Forces. In April 1944, Dermot was attached to the Royal Naval Reserve under Lt Colonel Bill Toombs as Intelligence Office and resident Turkish interpreter at the Coastal Forces Base. In September 1945 he sailed for Greece to assist the British forces fighting with the Greek Government in the Greek Civil War, serving in the operations room at the Naval Academy.

Following the Greek troubles, Dermot was appointed Naval Liaison Officer at Kavala. From there he served in Athens as part of M9/M19 the escape organisation, seeking out and rewarding natives who had assisted the allied personnel during the war. After the completion of this project Dermot was demobbed and returned to Britain via Malta.

By the end of his career Dermot had gained the rank of Lieutenant-Commander and in 1961 he was awarded the Royal Naval Volunteer Reserve Officers' Decoration (V.R.D.).

== Post war ==
Following his Naval service, Sir Dermot returned to education at Christ Church, Oxford, where he read Philosophy, Politics and Economics. Following graduation he entered business as a Management Accountant with Clubley Armstrong and later with Orr and Boss.

== In business ==
During the 1950s, Dermot served on the board of several industrial firms, which in 1961 he merged into a public company; The GHP (General Hydraulic Power) Group, becoming the first Managing Director, then Chairman in 1966. In 1976, GHP was merged with Low and Bonar and he became Vice-Chairman until June 1982 when he was appointed Chairman. He became a director of Imperial Continental Gas Association in 1963, serving as Deputy Chairman from 1972 to 1987, and chairing a number of their UK subsidiaries, including Compair and Calor Gas. From 1971 to 1987, he represented their interests by serving as a director of Petrofina SA. He retired from business in 1990 at the age of 65.

== Banking career ==
During his career, Sir Dermot served on the board of several European financial institutions including the BNP Paribas (Banque de Paris et des Pays Bas Ltd); Banque Belge Ltd; Belgian & General Investments and Friars Investment Trust.

== Post-retirement ==
Following his retirement from his business interests in 1990, Dermot became involved in charity work, he became a director of the Andover Crisis and Support Centre and of People Need Homes Plc. The latter was a continuation of a long interest in improving housing conditions, which had earlier led to him becoming a director of Hummingbird Housing Association and Hyde Housing Association. He also served terms as Chairman 1990-1992 and Vice-President 1993-1994 of the Institute of Directors.

== Personal life ==
Dermot married Patricia Beeley in 1948. The wedding took place at St James's Spanish Place, followed by the reception at Claridges Hotel. They had nine children, three sons and six daughters, including John Humphrey.

In 1972, Dermot and Patricia oversaw the sale of the 2,430-acre (9.8 km^{2}) Newsells Park Estate, Barkway which had been acquired by his Uncle, Humphrey de Trafford, 4th Baronet in 1926 and also the disposal of the Stud Farm which the family had established there. Dermot then settled in the village of Appleshaw, near Andover, Hampshire where he resided until 2003.

Dermot and Patricia were divorced in 1973. On 22 December 1973, Dermot de Trafford married Xandra Carandini Walter, only daughter of Lieutenant-Colonel Geoffrey Trollope Lee of the 60th King's Royal Rifle Corps and his wife Contessa Estelle Marie (née Carandini di Sarzano). Xandra was the elder sister of British actor Christopher Lee and had two daughters from her previous marriage to Roderick Walter; British actress Harriet and Charlotte. Lady de Trafford died in December 2002. Her personal estate was valued at £758,407 net, which she left to relatives, with a £1000 donation to the NSPCC.

Sir Dermot de Trafford died on 22 January 2010, three days after his 85th birthday, from undisclosed causes.

Baronetage of the United Kingdom
Preceded by Rudolph de Trafford	Baronet (of Trafford Park); 1983–2010	Succeeded by John de Trafford
