= Sir Humphrey de Trafford, 4th Baronet =

English racehorse owner

Sir Humphrey Edmund de Trafford, 4th Baronet MC JP DL (30 November 1891 – 6 October 1971) was a prominent English racehorse owner, and the grandfather of Brigadier Andrew Parker Bowles. He was the son of Sir Humphrey de Trafford, 3rd Baronet, and Violet Alice Maud Franklin.

== Early life ==
Born in London, Trafford was educated at The Oratory School and the Royal Military College, Sandhurst. After training he was commissioned into the Coldstream Guards as an officer in 1911.

He fought with distinction in the First World War and was awarded the Military Cross in 1917.

== Personal life ==
He married the Hon. Cynthia Hilda Evelyn Cadogan, daughter of Henry Arthur Cadogan, Viscount Chelsea and the Hon. Mildred Cecilia Harriet Sturt, on 2 October 1917. They had four daughters:

- Ann (14 July 1918 – 1987), who married Derek Henry Parker Bowles.
- Mary (23 February 1920 – 28 October 2007), who married Sir Francis James Cecil Bowes-Lyon
- Violet (17 June 1926 – 18 February 2021), who married Sir Max Aitken, 2nd Baronet
- Catherine (5 November 1928 – 21 January 2023), who married Fulke Walwyn

== Racehorse ownership ==
Trafford was an amateur rider and racehorse owner and a member of the Jockey Club and its National Hunt Committee.

In 1926, he purchased the Newsells Park Estate, Barkway near Royston, Hertfordshire as a home for his family and established a stud farm there, from which he bred most of his famous racehorses including Alcide who won the 1958 St. Leger Stakes and the 1959 King George VI and Queen Elizabeth Stakes and Parthia, who won the 1959 Epsom Derby. Other notable horses included Papillio who won the 1953 Goodwood Stakes and Approval who won the Observer Gold Cup at Doncaster in 1969 and the Dante Stakes at York in 1970. Trafford also served as Steward of The Jockey Club from 1934 to 1937 and then again in 1944 and 1951.

== Baronet ==
On the death of his father, on 10 January 1929, Trafford became the fourth Baronet. In 1940, he was one of four godparents at the christening of his grandson Brigadier Andrew Parker Bowles, Ann's son. Trafford served as a justice of the peace and a deputy lieutenant of Hertfordshire and in 1945 as High Sheriff of Hertfordshire.

Sir Humphrey Edmund de Trafford died on 6 October 1971 at the age of 79.

Baronetage of the United Kingdom
Preceded by Humphrey Francis de Trafford	Baronet (of Trafford Park); 1929–1971	Succeeded by Rudolph de Trafford
Honorary titles
Preceded by Michael Bruce Urquhart Dewar	High Sheriff of Hertfordshire; 1945	Succeeded by Sir Patrick Ashley Cooper
