= Sir Humphrey de Trafford, 2nd Baronet =

English landowner and baronet (1808–1886)

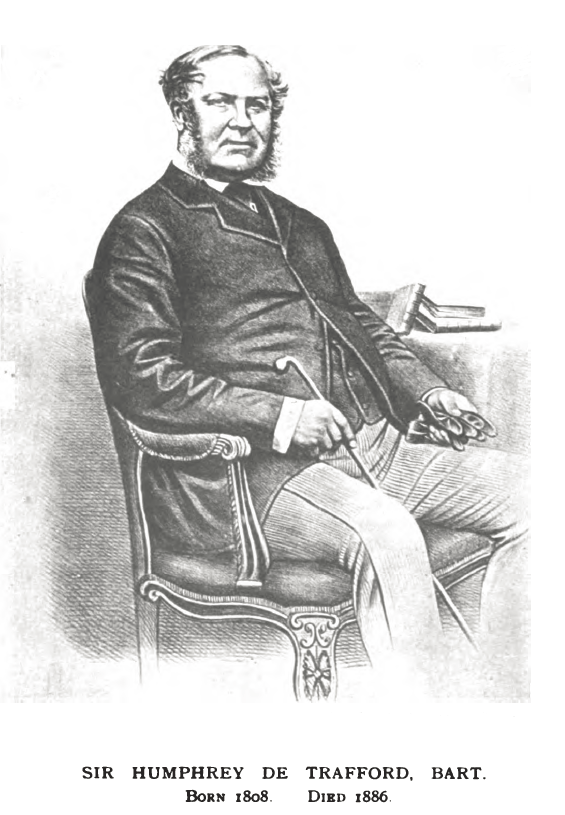
Humphrey de Trafford was the second de Trafford Baronet.

Sir Humphrey de Trafford, 2nd Baronet (1 May 1808 – 4 May 1886) was a prominent English Catholic. Born at Croston Hall near Chorley, Lancashire on 1 May 1808, he was the fourth child and the eldest son of Sir Thomas de Trafford.

== Early life ==
In 1821 he was entered as a pupil at the Manchester Grammar School and became a boarder in the high master's house. He also studied at Oscott College, a Catholic seminary. In 1826 he entered the Royal Dragoons, becoming a lieutenant in 1830, and retiring in 1832. He is recorded as having placed the last keystone in position for the Victoria Bridge, connecting Manchester and Salford across the River Irwell, on 23 March 1839. On the death of his father, on 10 November 1852, he became the 2nd Baronet de Trafford, 25th Lord of Trafford, and took up residence at the family home of Trafford Hall, in Trafford Park.

On 17 January 1855, he married Lady Annette Mary Talbot, eldest sister and co-heiress of Bertram Talbot, 17th Earl of Shrewsbury. The ceremony took place in Rugby, Warwickshire, and was performed by William Bernard Ullathorne, Bishop of Birmingham. It was reportedly the first Roman Catholic nuptial mass to be performed in England since the Reformation. They had five daughters and three sons:

- Mildred Mary Josephine (27 March 1856 – 29 December 1934), married Charles Bellew, 3rd Baron Bellew, 8 August 1883.
- Humphrey Francis, born 3 July 1862, who became the Third Baronet
- Charles Edmund, born 21 May 1864, who played cricket for Lancashire and the MCC, and captained Leicestershire for 17 seasons. Charles married Lady Agnes, daughter of Rudolph Feilding, 8th Earl of Denbigh, on 15 October 1892. Their eldest son, Captain Hubert Edmund de Trafford, was awarded the DSC for heroism during World War I and later emigrated to Malta, his daughter later returned to England and married Admiral Arthur Francis Turner.
- Gundrede Annette Teresa (born before 1866), married Sir Timothy Carew O'Brien, 3rd Baronet, also a cricketer, on 22 September 1885. Their daughter was the pioneering pilot Sicele O'Brien.
- Mary Annette
- Sicele Agnes (22 February 1867 – 5 February 1948). On 2 June 1892 she became the second wife of Charles William Clifford, son of Sir Charles Clifford, the first Speaker of the New Zealand House of Representatives.
- Mary Hilda, who became a nun
- Gilbert Talbot Joseph (born 1871/1872 – died 15 July 1890, aged 19)

The national land survey of 1873 records Sir Humphrey as holding 1,990 acres (810 ha) of land in Cheshire, producing an annual gross rental income of £3,361. In 1861 he served as High Sheriff of Lancashire

In 1881, he bought Hothorpe Hall in Northamptonshire (though near Theddingworth, Leicestershire), and presented it to his son Charles. The de Traffords purchased the hall from Henry Everett, great-nephew of John Cook, the hall's builder.

In 1884, the Lancashire and Cheshire Antiquarian Society, at its meeting on Friday 11 January, recorded the receipt from Sir Humphrey of the head of a stone hammer found in 1860 in a drain ditch at Blackshaw Farm near Alderley Edge.

== Manchester Ship Canal ==
In 1882, a meeting held at the Didsbury home of engineer Daniel Adamson resulted in the creation of the Manchester Ship Canal committee. Sir Humphrey was an implacable opponent of the proposed canal, which the committee proposed would cross his land at Trafford Park. He objected, among other grounds, that it would bring polluted water close to his residence, interfere with his drainage, and render Trafford Hall uninhabitable, forcing him to "give up his home and leave the place". Despite his opposition, the Ship Canal Bill became law on 6 August 1885, after two previous Bills had failed to get through Parliament. Sir Humphrey was paralysed in 1884 and never recovered. He died on 4 May 1886, three days after his 78th birthday. Construction of the Manchester Ship Canal began the following year.

Baronetage of the United Kingdom
Preceded by Thomas de Trafford	Baronet (of Trafford Park); 1852–1886	Succeeded by Humphrey de Trafford
Honorary titles
Preceded by Henry Garnett	High Sheriff of Lancashire; 1861	Succeeded by William A. F. Saunders
