= Thomas de Trafford =

British Baronet (1778–1852)

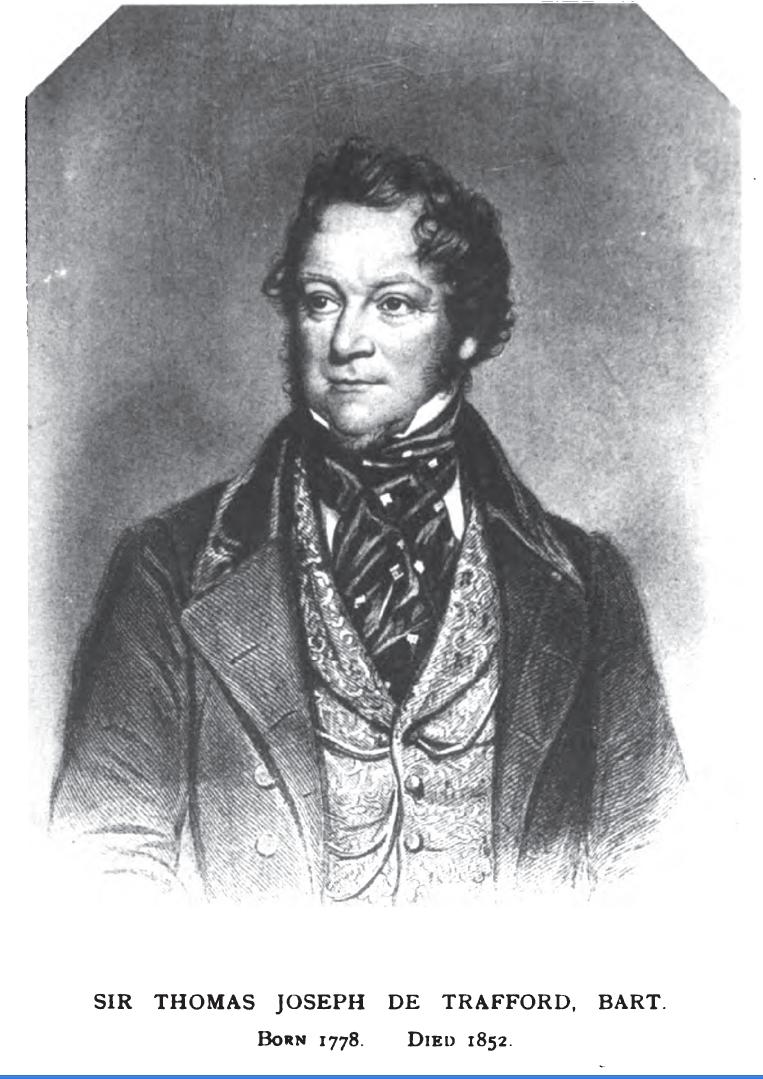
Thomas de Trafford was the first de Trafford Baronet.

Sir Thomas Joseph de Trafford, 1st Baronet, DL (22 March 1778 – 10 November 1852) was a member of a prominent family of English Roman Catholics. He served as commander of the Manchester and Salford Yeomanry at the time of the Peterloo Massacre. He was born at Croston Hall near Chorley, Lancashire, on 22 March 1778, son of John Trafford and Elizabeth Tempest, and was christened Thomas Joseph Trafford (no de).

== Marriage and family ==
Thomas married Laura Anne Colman (born 18 August 1780, baptized 9 November 1780, Cullompton), daughter of Francis Colman (d. 1820) of Hillersdon, Devon, and Jemima Searle (d. 1807), on 17 August 1803, and the couple lived at Trafford Hall, in Trafford Park. They had nine daughters and five sons, including:

- Elizabeth Jane, born 22 October 1804, died September 1813, aged 8
- Laura Ann, born 23 November 1805, who married Thomas William Riddell of Felton, Northumberland, on 4 September 1845 at All Saints Catholic Chapel, Barton-upon-Frode, and died 16 May 1877
- Jemima, born 30 January 1807, died 17 January 1883, who in 1829 married her father's first cousin Henry Tempest of Heaton (near Bolton), Lancashire, who was a JP for Lancashire. Their daughter, Jemima Monica Mildred Tempest (1841-1907), married Le Gendre Starkie in 1867.
- Humphrey Francis, born 1 May 1808, died 4 May 1886, who became the Second Baronet
- Jane Seymour, born 27 July 1809, who in 1842 married George Archer Shee, eldest son of Sir Martin Archer Shee, a former President of the Royal Academy. Jane and George's great-grandson George Archer-Shee was the subject of a notorious 1910 prosecution for allegedly stealing a 5 shilling postal order. The case formed the basis for the play The Winslow Boy.
- Maria, born 16 November 1810, died 9 May 1826, aged 15
- Caroline, born 29 March 1812, married William Gerard Walmesley of Westwood, Lancashire, son of Charles Walmesley (1781–1833), on 18 October 1838, and died 21 December 1883
- Thomas William, born 23 August 1813, never married, died 7 May 1844
- Sybilla Catherine (or Catherine-Sybilla), born 23 September 1815, who married Reverend John Sparling, third son of William Sparling of Petton Park, Shropshire, in 1843, and died 22 May 1886
- Belinda, born 29 November 1816, never married, died 19 February 1900
- Harriet (or Harriotte), born 25 August 1818, who married James Cunningham, a captain in the Fourth Dragoon Guards, on 27 April 1853
- John Randolphus, born 11 April 1820, married Lady Adelaide Cathcart, daughter of General Sir Charles Murray Cathcart, 2nd Earl Cathcart, and Henrietta Mather, on 13 July 1850, died 3 February 1879 (or possibly 15 February 1871). Succeeded to the Croston Estates, previously held jointly by his father with the Trafford estates. Eldest son Sigismund de Trafford.
- Charles Cecil, born 18 or 28 December 1821, never married, died 15 December 1878, a captain in the Third Regiment of the Duke of Lancaster's Own Militia and also an officer in the 1st Dragoons
- Augustus Henry, born 12 April 1823 (or 1828), married Gertrude Mary Walmesley, daughter of Herman Walmesley, on 19 September 1876, died 19 January 1895 at Haselour Hall, Tamworth

== Estates ==
After his father's death on 29 October 1815, and despite his position as the fifth son, Thomas inherited his father's estates in Lancashire and Cheshire. Two elder brothers, both named Joseph, had died in infancy and two others, Humphrey and John, had both died before their father.

By 12 November 1819, he is recorded as selling the advowson of the parish of St Bartholomew's Church, Wilmslow, to Edward Vigor Fox for £6,000. This gave the right to nominate the rector when the parish became vacant, and was a right conferred by lordship of the manor in many cases. Selling that right was legal, so long as the post was not already vacant. However, in this case it appears that Trafford and Fox drew up the sale after they learned that Joseph Bradshaw, the incumbent, was close to death. The sale was concluded at ten to three in the afternoon, and Bradshaw died at half past eleven the same night. At the time of the sale, Trafford was major-commandant of the Manchester and Salford Yeomanry, and Fox was a lieutenant in the same force.

Fox's subsequent nomination of George Uppleby as rector, on 30 December 1819, was contested by the Bishop of Chester, and the case wound through the courts during the 1820s. Eventually on 3 June 1829, the House of Lords heard Fox's appeal of earlier decisions voiding the appointment. The Lords could not find any evidence that Uppleby had conspired with Trafford and Fox to buy the appointment (an offence known as simony) and so they ruled in favor of Fox and Trafford.

Slater's Directory for 1845 names Thomas Ayres as Sir T. J. de Trafford's land agent in Stretford. In Edward Twycross's The Mansions of England and Wales (1847), Thomas is noted as the owner of Trafford Hall in the parish of Eccles on the southern bank of the Irwell, 5 miles (8.0 km) west of Manchester. The mansion is described as built of stone with a front featuring a classical portico with columns and a pediment. Tithe maps from the mid-19th century show that Thomas owned more than 700 plots in the Bollin valley near Wilmslow, amounting to about 430 acres (1.7 km^{2}).

Thomas is recorded as having divided the Manors of Trafford and Stretford, giving land including a portion of Croston Manor to his son John Randolphus. In 1853, John Randolphus applied for a £5,000 government loan to drain lands in "Croston, Penwortham, Wigan." In 1874, John Randolphus reunited Croston Manor for the first time since 1318 by purchasing the remainder from trustees of Thomas Norris.

It appears that Thomas Trafford was alert to the financial opportunities presented by the burgeoning coal mining industry. He leased mining rights at the Pemberton Four Feet Mine in Hindley to a partnership of Byrom, Taylor and Byrom for 33 years from 24 December 1849. Trafford was entitled to rent of "£75 per foot per Cheshire acre, and £100 per annum at the least." This venture evidently did not prove as profitable as the lessors had hoped. Within three years the partnership was bankrupt and the mine lease was auctioned on 27 October 1852.

== Military service and role in Peterloo Massacre ==
Thomas Trafford was commissioned as a Captain in the Third Battalion of the Royal Lancashire Militia on 6 March 1801, towards the end of Britain's involvement in the French Revolutionary Wars.

Much later, after the Blanketeers' march of 10 March 1817, the Manchester and Salford Yeomanry was formed in response to the perceived threat of riot, Trafford was commissioned as the Major-Commandant in charge of the Manchester and Salford Yeomanry on 23 August 1817.

By 1819, social discontent because of rising food prices and lack of suffrage had fueled a rise in radical groups in northern England. On 16 August 1819, Major Trafford was sent a note by a magistrate, local coalowner William Hulton, urging him to dispatch the cavalry regiment to a public meeting being addressed by the orator Henry Hunt. Major Trafford did send his 116 troops in response, but he appears not to have been present for the disastrous attack on the assembled crowd. Fifteen people died and hundreds were wounded. The government and landowners viewed the yeomanry's actions at Peterloo as a courageous defence against insurrection. Following the Peterloo Massacre, on 27 August 1819, Lord Sidmouth sent a message of thanks from the Prince Regent to Major Trafford, among others. However, public horror at the actions of the yeomanry grew after the massacre. Major Trafford resigned his commission in 1820, and the yeomanry corps was disbanded on 9 June 1824.

== Public office and creation of baronetcy ==
After the repeal of the Test Acts and the passage of the Roman Catholic Relief Act 1829, the Trafford family became eligible for offices previously barred to them by their religion. Thomas Trafford was appointed High Sheriff of Lancashire in 1834. He is also recorded as serving as Deputy Lieutenant of Lancashire.

He was created the First Baronet de Trafford on 7 September 1841. On 8 October 1841, Queen Victoria issued a royal licence to "Sir Thomas Joseph Trafford ... that he may henceforth resume the ancient patronymic of his family, by assuming and using the surname of De Trafford, instead of that of 'Trafford' and that such surname may be henceforth taken and used by his issue." The anglicisation to Trafford had probably occurred in the 15th century, when the Norman article "de", signifying that a family originated from a particular place, was generally dropped in England. The resumption of such older versions of family names was a romantic trend in 19th-century England, encouraged by a mistaken belief that the article "de" indicated nobility.

== Later life ==
Thomas de Trafford is recorded as living at 12 Grosvenor Street, in Mayfair, London, from 1847 to 1852. In 1852, Thomas was thrown from his horse and broke several ribs. While he was convalescing, his wife, Laura, died on 22 October 1852. The family delayed Laura's burial to 5 November, and Thomas died five days later at Trafford Park on 10 November 1852. Thomas de Trafford's funeral was held on 19 November 1852, with a procession departing Trafford Park at 8:30am. An immense crowd attended the service at Salford Cathedral.

== Bibliography ==
- Baines, Edward (1836), History of the County Palatine and Duchy of Lancaster, Fisher, Son, & Co.
- Richards, W.S.G. (1896), The History of the De Traffords of Trafford. Circa A.D. 1000-1893. Including the Royal and Baronial descents of the family. 202 pages, printed for private circulation, Plymouth

Baronetage of the United Kingdom
New creation	Baronet (of Trafford Park); 1841–1852	Succeeded by Humphrey de Trafford
Honorary titles
Preceded by Sir John Gerard, Bt	High Sheriff of Lancashire; 1834	Succeeded by Thomas Clifton
Military offices
New regiment	Major-Commandant of the Manchester and Salford Yeomanry; 1817–1820	Unknown
