= De Trafford baronets =

Baronetcy in the Baronetage of the United Kingdom

de Trafford baronets
- Arms of Trafford: Argent, a griffin segreant gules
- Creation date: 7 September 1841
- Created by: Queen Victoria
- Peerage: Baronetage of the United Kingdom
- First holder: Sir Thomas de Trafford
- Present holder: Sir John de Trafford
- Heir apparent: Alexander Humphrey de Trafford
- Remainder to: Heirs male of the body

The de Trafford Baronetcy, of Trafford Park in the County Palatine of Lancaster is a title in the Baronetage of the United Kingdom.

== Background ==
The creation of Trafford: In April 1016, King Cnut Sweynson of Norway and his army swept North-West across Wessex. Cnut's Viking army was composed of mercenary soldiers from Norway, Sweden, Denmark and Poland. They were led by a warrior named Rafe' or Ranulph. They fought and defeated the army of "Wolvernote", (likely Wolfnoth Cild, father of the future Earl Godwin), at the fortified village of Whickleswick, near the old Roman river crossing of trey-ford on the river Erwell.

In the spring of 1017 Cnut was crowned King of England. One of his early acts as king was to award the lands formerly controlled by "Wolvernote" to Ranulph and made him a lord. Ranulph established his demesne at tray-ford in a modest moated manor. He also took the name of the place, and became Ranulph, Lord of Tray-ford, later amended to Trafford. This begun the ancient family of Trafford. That manor would later be called "Trafford Hall" or "Moat House", seat of the Trafford family for the next 683 years. That manor at "Old Trafford” was finally torn down after 909 years, in 1926. The de Trafford family can trace their ancestry back to the 12th century. The family took their name from their manor of Trafford, now part of Greater Manchester.

Following the 1066 conquest by King William the 1st, the surviving Anglo-Saxon earls and lord barons continued to raise arms against the Norman Invaders, in what would be known as the rebellion of the earles. In the winter of 1070, Lord Radulphus of Trafford, led his combined armies against the Normans and defeated Sir Hamo de Massey's army at Tay Bridge, near Moberly in Chester. Between 1066 and 1070, the struggles resulted in the death of approximately 150,000 people, or one-fifth the total population of England. In 1129, Trafford's grandson married de Massey's granddaughter merging the two manors and their extensive land holdings.

Sir Hamo de Massey was a Norman knight/lord baron and nephew of King William I "the Conqueror". "Hamo de Mascy was the youngest son of William de La Ferte-Mace, viscount of the powerful Belleme (Bellamy) family of Normandy. William's oldest son was Baron Mathieu de La Ferte Mace. His middle son was Sir Hugue de Macey. All three sons were present at the Battle of Hastings in 1066, and as a result were awarded land grants in England. At Hastings, Mathieu's rank was Baron, Hugue's rank was knight, and Hamo served as Mathieu's squire and commanded a force of 70 archers. Mathieu who commanded a force of 80 knights was killed in battle shortly after Hastings, in Shropshire. Hamo received Mathieu's grants in Cheshire and founded the Mascy (Massey) family. The seat of his holdings was the village of Dunham and his family lived at Dunham-Massey Hall. His title was Baron de Dunham. Massey was made one of the eight Barons of Chester, closest to Sir Hugh d’Avranches, Earl of Chester (also known as Hugh Lupus, Hugh de Gross). Hamo had been named the Baron of Dunham, seated at Dunham-Massey Hall in 1066, located about 4 miles (6.4 km) from Trafford Manor.

Following the defeat of Sir Hamo de Masse, the Earl of Chester, Sir Hugh d’Avranches, gathered his armies and began to lay waste to the lands of those who fought against Masse. Sir Hugh d’Avranches, the 1st Norman Earl of Cheshire was the maternal-nephew of King William and cousin of Hamo.

"In the bitter cold winter of 1069-70, north-east of Stockport, d’Avranch destroyed Chester, the second major city of the north, with its ancient trade links to Dublin. His army destroyed communities, dispossessed the people and laid waste to the countryside so that there was no support for the people fighting against him. Those Saxons of the eastern plain of Cheshire who were not killed fled westward for safety, leaving most of the east of Cheshire desolate for many years. The Domesday Book of 1086 recorded the wasted 'manors' along his route from York to Chester and Shrewsbury".

It is estimated that 75% of the population of Anglo-Scandinavians were killed or dispossessed in the harrying of the North. In 1086, Yorkshire and the North Riding still had large areas of waste territory. The Domesday Book entries indicate waste as est or hoc est vast (it is wasted) for estate after estate; in all a total of 60% of all holdings were waste. It states that 66% of all villages contained wasted manors. Even the prosperous areas of the county had lost 60% of its value compared to 1066. Only 25% of the population and plough teams remained with a reported loss of 80,000 oxen and 150,000 people.

In 1070, Lord Radulphus of Trafford "made terms" with the earl of Chester. Those terms state that the Lord of Trafford should keep his lands and possessions on condition that he did not again fight against the Normans. In 1080, Radulphus received the peace, pardon and protection on behalf of King William, from Sir Hamon de Massey. Radulphus was also awarded the lands of Wulfnoth Godwinson, the younger brother of the rebellious Saxon Earl Godwin. Wulfnoth Godwinson was the son of Wolfnoth Cild, whose lands were awarded to Radulphus father, Ranulph. Sir Hugh d’Avranches, on behalf of King William, Knighted Radulphus. King William also issued royal license to Radulphus allowing the use of the "de" prefix to his surname showing his recognition of holding lands on behalf of the king, making him Sir Radulphus de Trafford, 1st Lord of Trafford (under Norman rule).

After King William died in battle in France in September 1087, Ralph, son of Rafe Trafford, and his son Robert received a pardon and protection by the new king, William II, during the Norman uprisings that followed the death of his father. Ralph was awarded the manors and townships of Foxdenton and Chatterton in Lancashire for services rendered to King William II.

The 14th century was important for these manorial lords, in receiving acclaim from the Crown. Henry Trafford died in 1395, holding the manors of Trafford and Stretford, together with part of the manor of Edgeworth, and leaving a son and heir Henry, six years of age. This son died in 1408, the manors going to his brother Edmund, known as the Alchemist, from his having procured a licence from the king in 1446 authorizing him to transmute metals. Sir Edmund, at Eccles in 1411, married Alice daughter and co-heir of Sir William Venables of Bollin, and thus acquired a considerable estate in Cheshire, which descended in the Trafford family for many generations.

Cecil Trafford was made a knight at Hoghton Tower in 1617. He was at first, like his grandfather, a Protestant and a persecutor, but afterwards, about 1632, became a Catholic. As a recusant family, they faced persecution and, in 1638, accordingly, the king seized a third of his estates and granted them on lease to farmers. Siding with the king on the outbreak of the English Civil War, he was seized and imprisoned by Roundheads and his estates were sequestered. His sons are mentioned as serving some of the English Interregnum at Rome and Douay. In 1653 Sir Cecil begged leave to transact under the Recusants Act relating to the sequestered two-thirds of his estates.

Sir Cecil died in 1672. His eldest son Edmund died twenty years later, and was followed by a brother Humphrey, who was accused of participation in the fictitious plot of 1694, and sympathized with the rising of 1715. Around this time the family left their original home, which they occupied since 1017, moving to Whittleswick Hall, which they renamed Trafford Hall. Humphrey was succeeded by his son and grandson, also both named Humphrey. The last of these died in 1779 and was succeeded by his relative John Trafford of Croston, who died in 1815. During this time, owing to the laws concerning religion, all offices of state were closed to Catholics, who had therefore to dwell quietly on their estates. The family's prospects improved after the Catholic Emancipation, and in 1841 John Trafford was created a baronet by Queen Victoria. Sir John later obtained royal licence to change the family name from "Trafford" to "de Trafford", thus restoring it to its original mediaeval form.

== Coat of arms ==
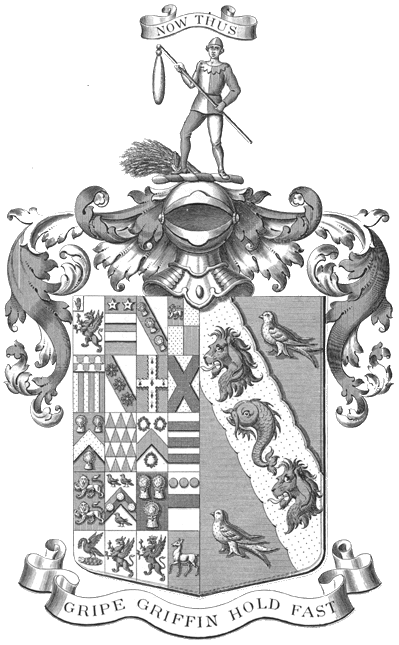
Armorial display from the bookplate of the third Baronet, showing his full twenty quarterings impaling the arms of his wife

The arms of the family consist of a red griffin on a silver background, blazoned argent, a griffin segreant gules. Their crest is a man in the act of threshing a wheatsheaf with a flail. This refers to a legend in which a member of the family escaped the Roundhead army by pretending to be a thresher. They have two mottoes: "Now Thus", and "Gripe Griffin Hold Fast".

In addition to their original family arms, the de Traffords have amassed a collection of nineteen quarterings, an unusually large amount even for an old family. The Baronet's full achievement is blazoned:

Quarterly of twenty: 1st argent, a griffin segreant gules (de Trafford); 2nd argent, two bars, and in chief two mullets pierced azure (Venables); 3rd argent, on a bend azure three garbs proper (Tritten); 4th quarterly gules and or, in the first quarter a lion passant argent (Massey); 5th paly of six argent and gules, a chief vair (Whitney); 6th argent, on a bend gules three escarbuncles sable (Thornton); 7th vert, a cross engrailed ermine (Kingsley); 8th or, a saltire sable (Hellesby); 9th azure, a chevron argent between three garbs proper (Hatton); 10th bendy barry gules and argent (Crispen); 11th argent, a chevron gules between three chaplets (Ashton); 12th argent, three bars sable (Legh); 13th gules, two lions passant guardant in pale argent (De la Mere); 14th argent, on a chevron quarterly gules and sable, between three birds of the second, as many bezants (Kitchen); 15th argent, three garbs proper banded or (Aughton); 16th argent, a fesse sable, in chief three torteaux (Mason); 17th argent, on a child proper wrapped in swaddling clothes gules, and banded or, an eagle sable (Culcheth); 18th argent, a griffin segreant azure (Culcheth); 19th argent, a griffin segreant sable ducally crowned or (Risseley); 20th azure, a hind trippant argent (Hindley). Upon the escutcheon, which is charged with his badge of Ulster as a Baronet, is placed a helmet befitting his degree, with a Mantling gules and argent; and for his Crest, upon a wreath of the colours, a thresher proper, his hat and coat per pale argent and gules, his breeches and stockings of the third and second, holding in both hands a flail or, uplifted over a garb on the dexter side, and over the crest upon an escroll the Motto, "Now Thus"; and below the arms the Motto "Gripe Griffin, Hold Fast".

== De Trafford baronets of Trafford Park (1841) ==
- Sir Thomas Joseph de Trafford, 1st Baronet (1778–1852)
- Sir Humphrey de Trafford, 2nd Baronet (1808–1886)
- Sir Humphrey Francis de Trafford, 3rd Baronet (1862–1929)
- Sir Humphrey Edmund de Trafford, 4th Baronet (1891–1971)
- Sir Rudolph Edgar Francis de Trafford, 5th Baronet (1894–1983)
- Sir Dermot Humphrey de Trafford, 6th Baronet (1925–2010)
- Sir John Humphrey de Trafford, 7th Baronet (born 1950)

Sir John's son Alexander Humphrey de Trafford (born 1978) is the heir apparent.
