= 1797 in Great Britain =

Events from the year 1797 in Great Britain.

== Incumbents ==
- Monarch – George III
- Prime Minister – William Pitt the Younger (Tory)
- Foreign Secretary – Lord Grenville

== Events ==
- 3 January – three of the stones making up Stonehenge fall due to heavy frosts.
- 15 January – London haberdasher John Hetherington wears the first top hat in public and attracts a large crowd of onlookers. He is later fined £50 for causing public nuisance.
- 14 February – Battle of Cape St Vincent: The Royal Navy under Admiral Sir John Jervis defeats a larger Spanish fleet off Cape St. Vincent, Portugal. On 23 May, Jervis is made Earl of St Vincent, and Horatio Nelson made a Knight of the Bath, for their part in the victory.
- 18 February – Spanish Governor José María Chacón peacefully surrenders the colony of Trinidad and Tobago to a British naval force commanded by Sir Ralph Abercromby.
- 22 February – the last invasion of Britain begins: French forces under the command of American Colonel William Tate land near Fishguard in Wales.
- 24 February – Tate surrenders at Fishguard.
- 26 February – start of "restriction period" during which, by Government order, Bank of England notes are inconvertible to gold. The Bank issues the first one-pound and two-pound notes (the former denomination remains in issue until 11 March 1988).
- 16 April–30 June – Spithead and Nore mutinies: two mutinies in the Royal Navy spark fears of a revolution.
- 17 April – Sir Ralph Abercromby unsuccessfully invades San Juan, Puerto Rico, in what would be one of the largest British attacks on Spanish territories in the western hemisphere and one of the worst defeats of the navy for years to come.
- April – prisoners taken in the French Revolutionary Wars are first moved to the world's first purpose-built prisoner-of-war camp, located at Norman Cross in Huntingdonshire.
- 30 May – Abolitionist William Wilberforce marries Barbara Ann Spooner in Bath about six weeks after their first meeting.
- July – Duties on Clocks and Watches Act 1797 imposed; it is repealed the following year.
- 24 July – Horatio Nelson is wounded at the Battle of Santa Cruz, causing the loss of his right arm.
- August – The Home Office sends an agent to Nether Stowey in Somerset to investigate the poets Samuel Taylor Coleridge and William Wordsworth who are suspected of being French spies.
- 29 August – Massacre of Tranent: British troops attack protestors against enforced recruitment into the militia at Tranent in Scotland, killing 12.
- October – Coleridge composes the poem Kubla Khan in an opium-induced dream, writing down only a fragment of it on waking.
- 11 October – Battle of Camperdown: Royal Navy defeats the fleet of the Batavian Republic off the coast of Holland.
- 18 October – Treaty of Campo Formio ends the First Coalition, leaving Britain fighting alone against France.
- November – 1797 Rugby School rebellion: The pupils at Rugby School rebel against the headmaster, Henry Ingles, after he decrees that the damage to a tradesman's windows should be paid for by the students.
- 16 November (or 23 November?) – Royal Navy frigate HMS Tribune (1796) is wrecked on the approaches to Halifax, Nova Scotia; of the 240 on board, all but 12 are lost.
- Undated
  - "Cartwheel" twopence coins pressed, for the only time, at Boulton and Watt's Soho Mint in copper.
  - Norwich Union insurance office established.

=== Ongoing ===
- Anglo-Spanish War, 1796–1808.
- French Revolutionary Wars, First Coalition.

== Publications ==
- Thomas Bewick's History of British Birds vol. 1.

== Births ==
- 3 January – Frederick William Hope, entomologist (died 1862)
- 6 January – Edward Turner Bennett, zoologist and writer (died 1836)
- 7 January – Henry Piddington, merchant captain in the East (died 1858)
- 14 January – George Agar-Ellis, 1st Baron Dover, politician and man of letters (died 1833)
- 24 January – John Shaw-Lefevre, barrister, Whig politician and civil servant (died 1879)
- 28 January – Charles Gray Round, barrister, Conservative Member of Parliament for North Essex 1837–47 (died 1867)
- 1 February – Frederick Sullivan, cricketer (died 1873)
- 2 February – Lambert Blackwell Larking, clergyman (died 1868)
- 4 February
  - Armine Simcoe Henry Mountain, British Army officer, Adjutant-General in India (died 1854)
  - Frederick Henry Yates, actor and theatre manager (died 1842)
- 5 February – Robert Benson, barrister and author, recorder of Salisbury (died 1844)
- 10 February – George Chichester, 3rd Marquess of Donegall, Anglo-Irish landowner, courtier and politician (died 1883)
- 11 February – Richard Temple-Nugent-Brydges-Chandos-Grenville, 2nd Duke of Buckingham and Chandos, Conservative politician (died 1861)
- 13 February – Hugh Andrew Johnstone Munro of Novar, Scottish art collector (died 1864)
- 25 February – Maria Abdy, poet (died 1867)
- 27 February – Henry George Ward, diplomat, politician and colonial administrator (died 1860)
- 3 March – Emily Eden, poet and novelist (died 1869)
- 4 March – Thomas Thorp, Anglican priest (died 1877)
- 10 March
  - Henry Acton, Unitarian minister (died 1843)
  - Henry Liddell, 1st Earl of Ravensworth, peer, Member of Parliament (died 1878)
  - George Julius Poulett Scrope, geologist, political economist and magistrate (died 1876)
- 12 March – Benjamin Caesar, cricketer (died 1867)
- 16 March
  - Lavinia Ryves, claimant to membership of the royal family (died 1871)
  - Alaric Alexander Watts, poet and journalist (died 1864)
- 19 March – John Braithwaite, engineer, inventor of the first steam fire engine (died 1870)
- 20 March – John Roberton, Scottish physician and social reformer (died 1876)
- 23 March – Ernest Edgcumbe, 3rd Earl of Mount Edgcumbe, politician (died 1861)
- 24 March – Sackville Lane-Fox, Conservative politician (died 1874)
- 26 March – Hedworth Lambton, Liberal Member of Parliament (died 1876)
- 27 March – George Glyn, 1st Baron Wolverton, banker (died 1873)
- 31 March – Walter Calverley Trevelyan, naturalist and geologist (died 1879)
- 2 April
  - John Peter Gassiot, businessman and amateur scientist (died 1877)
  - David Robertson, 1st Baron Marjoribanks, Scottish stockbroker and politician (died 1873)
- 17 April
  - William Beresford, Conservative politician (died 1883)
  - John Ogilvie, Scottish lexicographer, editor of Imperial Dictionary of the Language (died 1867)
- 18 April – Richard Ryan, biographer (died 1849)
- 29 April – George Don, botanist (died 1856)
- 3 May – George Webster, architect (died 1864)
- 7 May
  - Charles Frederick, Royal Navy officer, Third Naval Lord (died 1875)
  - Elizabeth Grant, diarist (died 1885)
- 13 May
  - William Chapman, surgeon, Director of the Kew Botanical Gardens (died 1867 in New Zealand)
  - Sir William Miles, 1st Baronet, politician (died 1878)
- 15 May – Lydia Irving, philanthropist, prison visitor (died 1893)
- 19 May – Richard Pakenham, diplomat, Ambassador to the United States (died 1868)
- 24 May – Henry Thynne, 3rd Marquess of Bath, naval officer and politician (died 1837)
- 27 May – Sir Thomas Bazley, 1st Baronet, industrialist and politician (died 1883)
- 8 June – Henry William-Powlett, 3rd Baron Bayning, peer and clergyman (died 1866)
- 11 June
  - Francis Conyngham, 2nd Marquess Conyngham, soldier, courtier and politician (died 1876)
  - Henry Lascelles, 3rd Earl of Harewood, peer and Member of Parliament (died 1857)
- 24 June
  - Mary Ann Aldersey, nonconformist, first Christian woman missionary in China (died 1868)
  - Ann Freeman, Bible Christian preacher (died 1826)
- 27 June – Henry Noble Shipton, military officer (died 1821)
- 6 July – Henry Paget, 2nd Marquess of Anglesey, peer, Whig politician, courtier and cricketer (died 1869)
- 7 July – George Meads, cricketer (died 1881)
- 11 July – Francis Close, rector of Cheltenham (1826–1856) and Dean of Carlisle (1856–1881) (died 1882)
- 14 July – James Scott Bowerbank, naturalist, palaeontologist (died 1877)
- 17 July – John Hodgetts-Foley, Member of Parliament (died 1861)
- 18 July – Robert Christison, Scottish toxicologist and physician (died 1882)
- 24 July – Maria Foote, actress (died 1867)
- 26 July
  - William Bulkeley Hughes, Welsh politician (died 1882)
  - William Gore Ouseley, diplomat serving in the United States (died 1866)
  - William Ranwell, marine painter (died 1861)
- 30 July – Harriet Windsor-Clive, 13th Baroness Windsor, landowner and philanthropist in Wales (died 1869)
- 1 August – William Knollys, general (died 1883)
- 2 August
  - John Brown, geographer (died 1861)
  - William Gibson-Craig, Scottish advocate and politician (died 1878)
- 9 August – Charles Robert Malden, explorer (died 1855)
- 11 August – George Shillibeer, coachbuilder (died 1866)
- 14 August – Robert Radcliffe, cricketer (died 1832)
- 20 August – John Sinclair, Archdeacon of Middlesex (died 1875)
- 21 August – John Iltyd Nicholl, Welsh Member of Parliament (died 1853)
- 22 August – Thomas Dale, Dean of Rochester (died 1870)
- 24 August – John Cobbold, brewer, railway developer and Conservative politician (died 1882)
- 27 August – Henry Wilson, Suffolk politician (died 1866)
- 30 August – Mary Shelley, writer (died 1851)
- 31 August – James Ferguson, Scottish-born astronomer and engineer (died 1867 in the United States)
- 2 September – William Stephenson, Geordie printer, publisher, auctioneer, poet and songwriter (died 1838)
- 3 September – Benjamin Nottingham Webster, actor-manager and dramatist (died 1882)
- 13 September – Joseph Stannard, marine and landscape painter (died 1830)
- 21 September – George Hamilton Seymour, diplomat (died 1880)
- 5 October – John Gardner Wilkinson, traveller, writer and pioneer Egyptologist (died 1875)
- 7 October – John Wedderburn Dunbar Moodie, Scottish-born army officer (died 1869)
- 9 October – Henry Collen, royal miniature portrait painter (died 1879)
- 10 October – Thomas Drummond, army officer, civil engineer and public official (died 1840)
- 13 October
  - George Anson, military officer and Whig politician (died 1857)
  - Thomas Haynes Bayly, poet (died 1839)
  - William Motherwell, Scottish poet, antiquary and journalist (died 1835)
- 15 October – William Siborne, Army officer and military historian (died 1849)
- 16 October – James Brudenell, 7th Earl of Cardigan, military commander (died 1868)
- 21 October – William Hale, inventor (died 1870)
- 1 November
  - Michael Loam, Cornish engineer, pioneer of the man engine (died 1871)
  - Sir Hedworth Williamson, 7th Baronet (died 1861)
- 13 November – Jacob Astley, 16th Baron Hastings (died 1859)
- 14 November – Charles Lyell, Scottish geologist (died 1875)
- 20 November – Mary Buckland, palaeontologist and marine biologist (died 1857)
- 22 November – David Salomons, banker and campaigner for emancipation of the Jews in England (died 1873)
- 12 December – Lucy Anderson, pianist (died 1878)
- 17 December – Richard Cheslyn, cricketer (died 1858)
- 22 December
  - Charles Fox, Cornish Quaker scientist (died 1878)
  - Thomas Manders, actor-manager and low comedian (died 1859)
- 24 December – Lewis Jones, Royal Navy officer (died 1895)
- 28 December – John Marshall, Member of Parliament for Leeds (died 1836)
- Tommaso Benedetti, painter (died 1863 in Austria)
- Approximate date – Thomas Cautley Newby, publisher (died 1882)

== Deaths ==
- 21 February – John Parkhurst, lexicographer (born 1728)
- 2 March – Horace Walpole, politician and writer (born 1717)
- 6 March – William Hodges, landscape painter (born 1744)
- 7 March – John Gabriel Stedman, colonial soldier and author (born 1744 in the Netherlands)
- 19 March – Philip Hayes, composer, organist, singer and conductor (born 1738)
- 26 March – James Hutton, Scottish geologist (born 1726)
- 31 March – Olaudah Equiano, ex-slave and slavery abolitionist (born 1745 in Nigeria)
- 7 April – William Mason, cleric, poet, editor and gardener (born 1724)
- 29 April – Elizabeth Ryves, Irish-born writer (born 1750)
- 7 May – Jedediah Strutt, cotton spinner (born 1726)
- 25 May – John Griffin, 4th Baron Howard de Walden, field marshal (born 1719)
- 28 June – George Keate, poet (born 1729)
- 30 June – Richard Parker, sailor and mutineer, executed (born 1767)
- 9 July – Edmund Burke, Irish-born philosopher (born 1723)
- 25 July – killed at Battle of Santa Cruz de Tenerife
  - Richard Bowen, Royal Navy officer (born 1761)
  - George Thorp, Royal Navy officer (born 1777)
- 29 July – John Weatherhead, Royal Navy officer, died of wounds received at Battle of Santa Cruz (born 1775)
- 3 August – Jeffery Amherst, 1st Baron Amherst, field-marshal and Commander-in-Chief (born 1717)
- 6 August – James Pettit Andrews, historian and antiquary (born 1737)
- 18 August – Josiah Spode, potter (born 1733)
- 29 August – Joseph Wright of Derby, painter (born 1734)
- 4 September – Sir William Ashburnham, 4th Baronet, cleric (born 1710)
- 10 September – Mary Wollstonecraft, feminist writer and philosopher (born 1759)
- 21 September – Hugh Pigot, Royal Navy officer, murdered (born 1769)
- 25 September – John Baughan, carpenter, thief and transportee to Australia (born 1754)
- 29 September – George Raper, nature artist (born 1769)
- 4 October – Anthony Keck, architect (born 1726)
- 20 October – William Cooke, cleric and academic (born 1711)
- 11 December – Richard Brocklesby, physician (born 1722)
- 14 December – John Robert Cozens, romantic watercolour landscape painter and draughtsman, insane (born 1752)
- 26 December – John Wilkes, radical politician and journalist (born 1725)
- 30 December – David Martin, Scottish portrait painter and engraver (born 1737)
- Thomas Kirk, painter, illustrator and engraver, consumption (born 1765)

== See also ==
- 1797 in Wales
