= 1821 in the United Kingdom =

Events from the year 1821 in the United Kingdom. This is a census year.

== Incumbents ==
- Monarch – George IV
- Prime Minister – Robert Jenkinson, 2nd Earl of Liverpool (Tory)
- Foreign Secretary – Robert Stewart, 2nd Marquess of Londonderry
- Secretary of War – Lord Bathurst

== Events ==
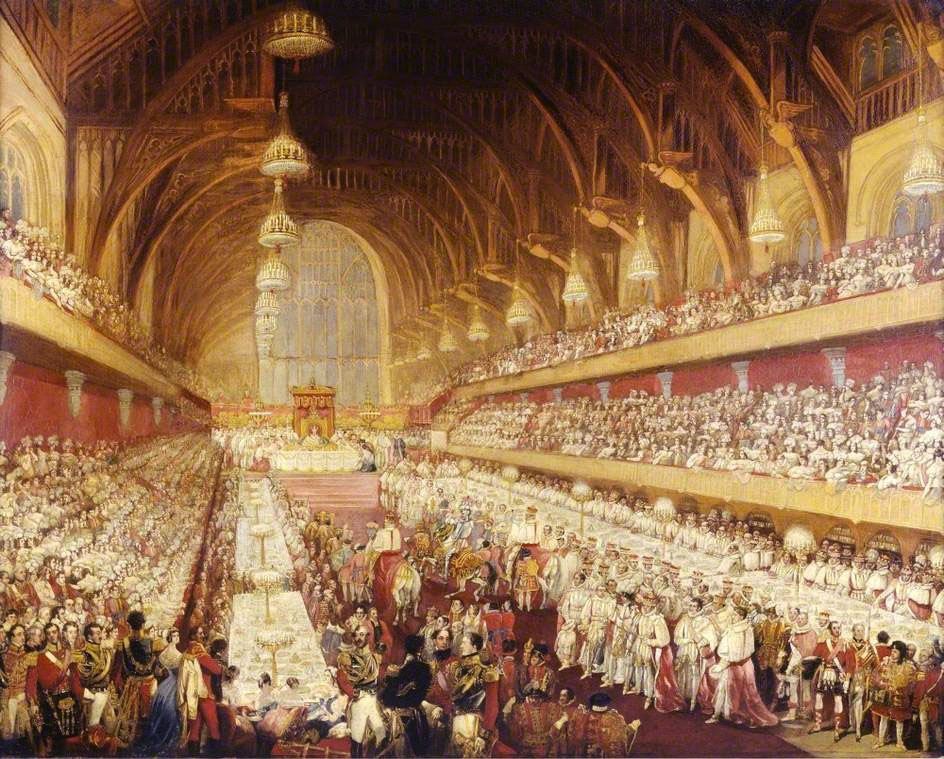
The coronation banquet for George IV

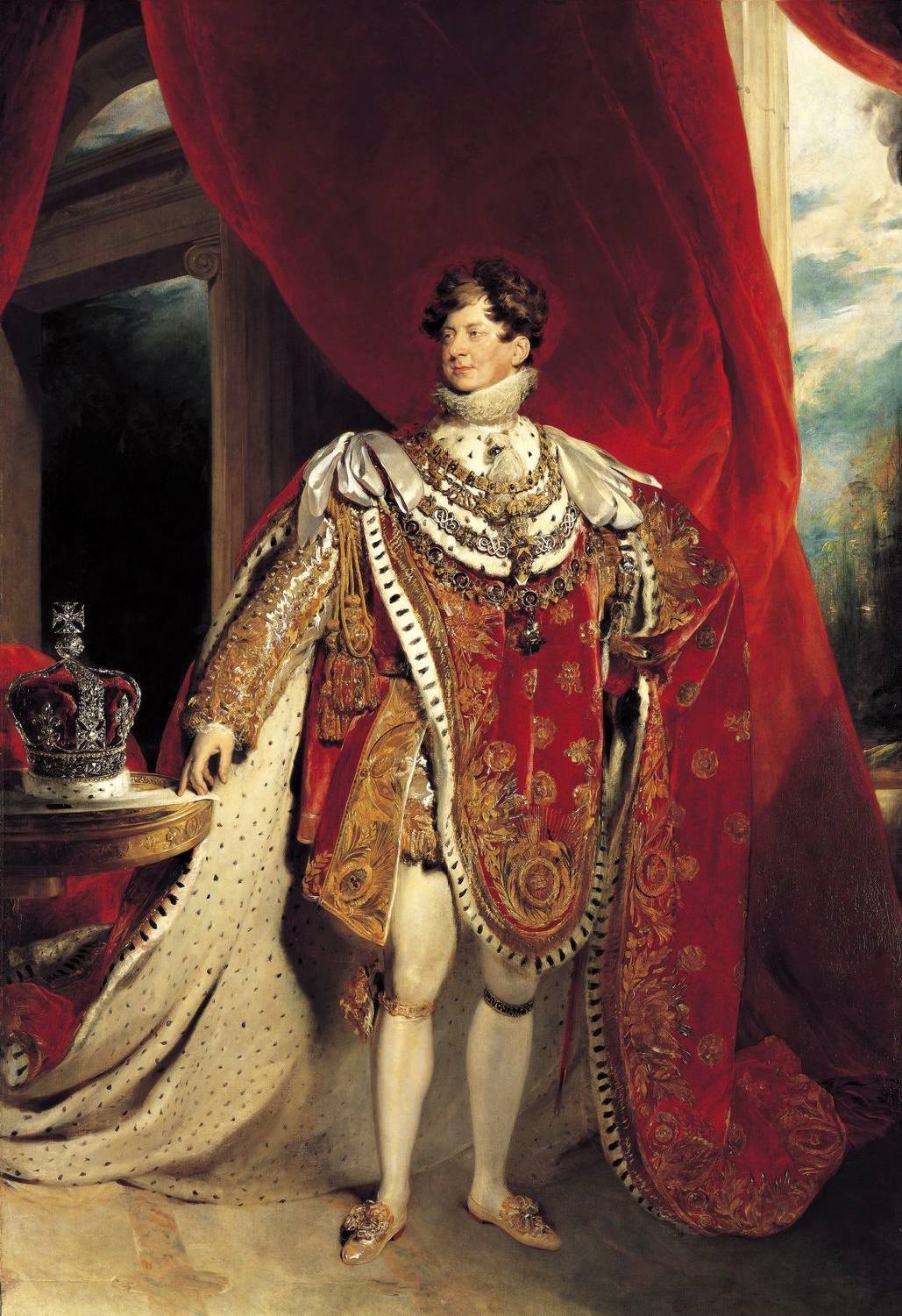
Coronation portrait of George of IV by Sir Thomas Lawrence

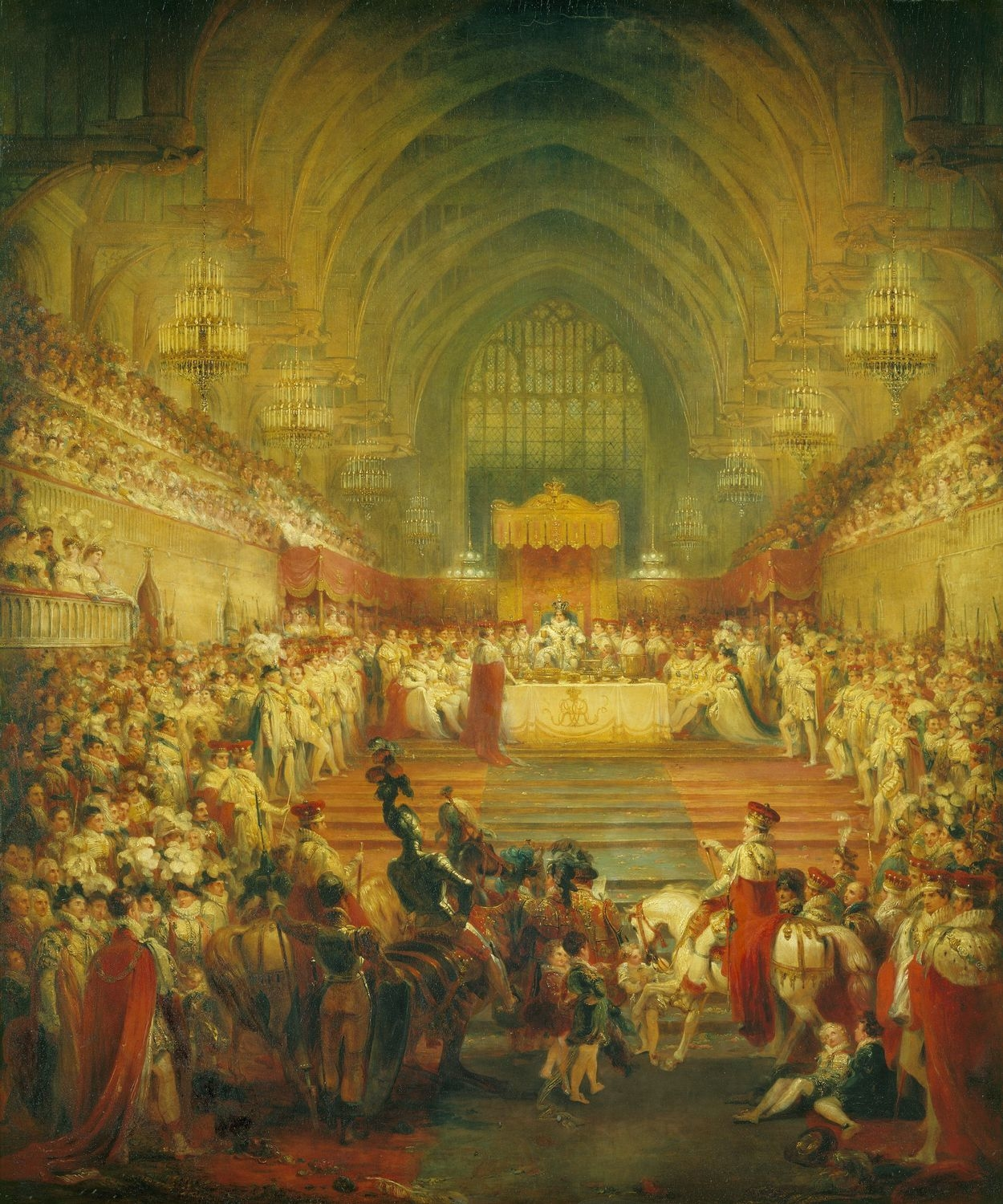
The Banquet at the Coronation of George IV by George Jones.

- 16 January – The governing Tories under Robert Jenkinson, 2nd Earl of Liverpool win the general election which had begun in 1820.
- 2 February – Cinderloo Uprising: Shropshire Yeomanry fire on a crowd of miners striking over a pay cut in the Coalbrookdale Coalfield, killing three.
- 16 February – John Scott, editor of The London Magazine, is fatally wounded in a duel fought over a literary dispute near the Chalk Farm Tavern just outside London.
- 18 February – Launch of the New Observer newspaper, later to become The Sunday Times.
- April–May – John Constable completes his painting The Hay Wain.
- 5 May
  - The deposed French Emperor Napoleon dies a prisoner in British military custody on the island of Saint Helena.
  - The Guardian newspaper is founded as The Manchester Guardian.
- 7 May
  - Bank of England returns to the gold standard.
  - The Royal Academy Exhibition of 1821 opens at Somerset House with John Constable's The Hay Wain and William Etty's The Triumph of Cleopatra amongst the works on display
- 28 May – The national census is the first to measure age distribution and reveals that almost half of the population is under twenty years old. Over the preceding decade in England and Wales the population has increased by 18%.
- 4 July – The redesigned Haymarket Theatre opens in London's West End.
- 19 July – George IV is crowned king of the United Kingdom of Great Britain and Ireland. His estranged wife, Caroline of Brunswick, is turned away from the ceremony (she falls ill this evening and dies 3 weeks later). This is the last coronation at which there is a banquet, at which the full ceremony of the King's Champion is carried out, and at which dillegrout is served.
- 31 July – Opening of the Eau Brink Cut, improving the outfall of the River Great Ouse at King's Lynn in Norfolk. Engineers working on the project included John Rennie the Elder, Thomas Telford and Thomas Hyde Page.
- 12 August–3 September – George IV becomes the first monarch to pay a state visit to Ireland since the 14th century.

=== Undated ===
- Elizabeth Fry and others establish the British Ladies' Society for Promoting the Reformation of Female Prisoners, an early example of a national women's organisation.

== Publications ==
- Thomas De Quincey's autobiographical Confessions of an English Opium-Eater (anonymously in The London Magazine).
- Robert Owen's treatise Report to the County of Lanark, of a plan for relieving public distress and removing discontent.
- Walter Scott's anonymous novel Kenilworth.
- Percy Bysshe Shelley's elegy Adonais.

== Births ==
- 2 January – Catherine Huggins, actor, singer, director and manager (died 1887)
- 3 February – Elizabeth Blackwell, physician, abolitionist and women's rights activist (died 1910)
- 17 February – Lola Montez, born Eliza Rosanna Gilbert, Irish-born "Spanish dancer" and mistress of Ludwig I of Bavaria (died 1861 in the United States)
- 8 March – James Sheridan Muspratt, Irish-born research chemist and teacher (died 1871)
- 15 March – William Milligan, Scottish theologian (died 1893)
- 19 March – Richard Francis Burton, explorer, orientalist and translator (died 1890)
- 25 March – Isabella Banks, poet and novelist (died 1897)
- 28 March – William Howard Russell, Irish-born war correspondent (died 1907)
- 3 April – T. Pelham Dale, mystic (died 1892)
- 12 April – Beauchamp Seymour, admiral (died 1895)
- 16 April – Ford Madox Brown, painter (died 1893)
- 21 April – Philip Henry Delamotte, pioneer photographer (died 1889)
- 26 April – Robert Adamson, Scottish pioneer photographer (died 1848)
- 27 April – Henry Willis, organ builder (died 1901)
- 29 May – Frederick Locker-Lampson, man of letters (died 1895)
- 16 June – Old Tom Morris, Scottish golfer (died 1908)
- 30 June – William Hepworth Dixon, historian, traveller and journal editor (died 1879)
- 9 July
  - George Cavendish-Bentinck, Conservative politician (died 1891)
  - Adolphus Frederick Alexander Woodford, freemason and clergyman (died 1887)
- 16 August – Arthur Cayley, mathematician (died 1895)
- 28 August – Thomas Seddon, landscape painter (died 1856 in Egypt)
- 11 October – George Williams, founder of the YMCA (died 1905)
- 30 November – Frederick Temple, Archbishop of Canterbury (died 1902)
- 11 December – George Granville Bradley, Dean of Westminster and scholar (died 1903)

== Deaths ==
- 23 February – John Keats, poet, of tuberculosis in Rome (born 1795)
- 4 March – Princess Elizabeth of Clarence, daughter of William, Duke of Clarence (later King William IV) (born 1820)
- 2 May – Hester Thrale, diarist and patron of the arts (born 1741?)
- 28 May – Charles Alfred Stothard, draughtsman (born 1786)
- 15 June – John Ballantyne, Scottish publisher (born 1774)
- 4 July – Richard Cosway, portrait painter (born 1742)
- 7 August – Caroline of Brunswick, estranged queen consort of King George IV, intestinal obstruction (born 1768)
- 1 August – Elizabeth Inchbald, novelist and dramatist (born 1753)
- 24 August – John William Polidori, physician and writer, probable suicide (born 1795)
- 4 October – John Rennie the Elder, civil engineer (born 1761)
- 5 October – Claudius Rich, archaeologist and anthropologist (born 1787)
- November – Alexander Gordon, distiller (born 1742)
- 17 November – James Burney, rear-admiral and naval writer (born 1750)
- 4 December – John Henniker-Major, 2nd Baron Henniker, politician (born 1752)
- 5 December – Henry Noble Shipton, army officer (born 1797)
- 12 December – Phoebe Hessel, female soldier (born 1713)
