= Peterloo Memorial =

2019 memorial in Manchester, England

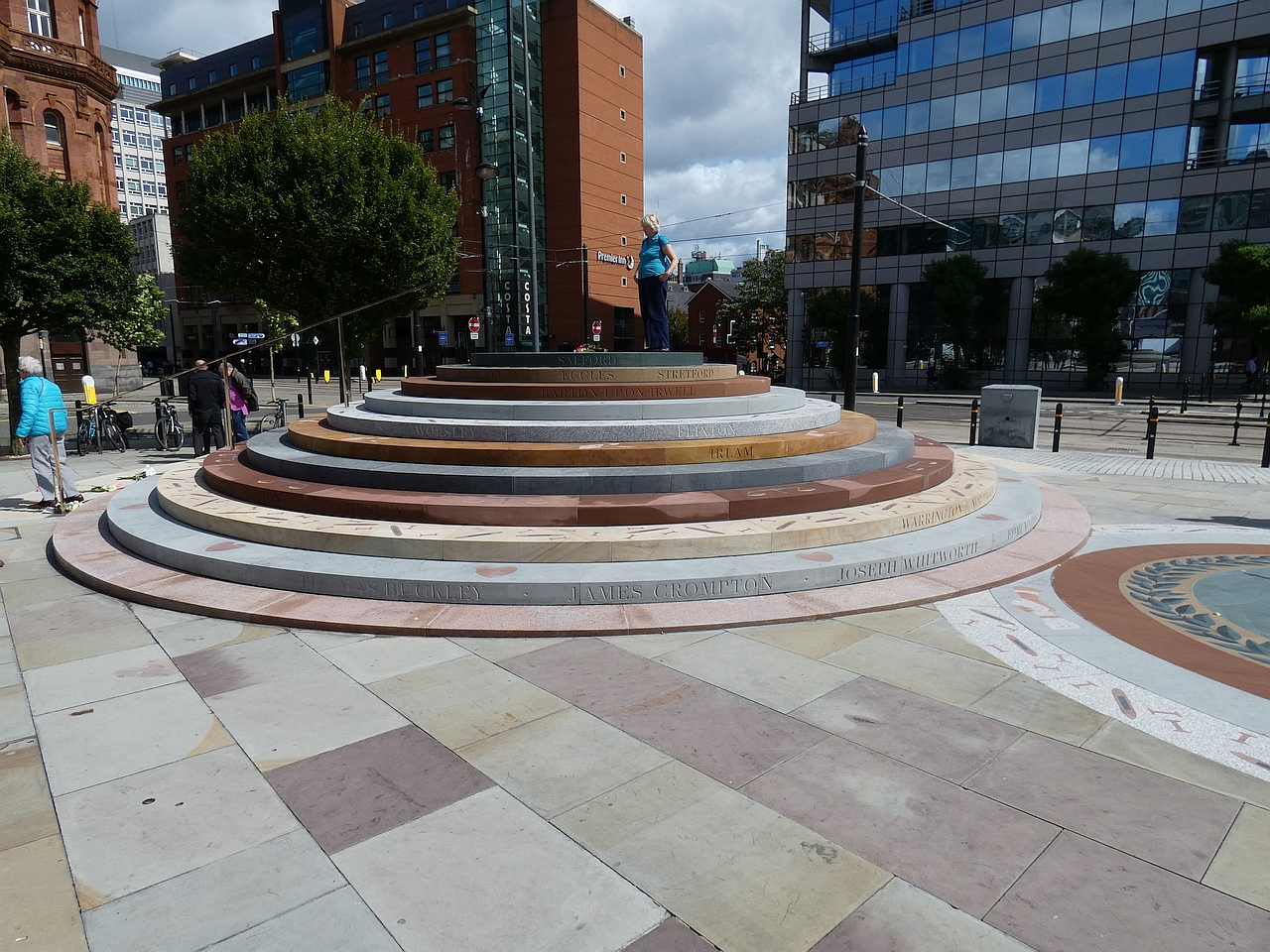
- Interactive map of Peterloo Memorial
- Location: Manchester, England
- Coordinates: 53.4766°N 2.2457°W
- Designer: Jeremy Deller
- Material: Stone
- Width: 11.6 m (38 ft)
- Opening date: 14 August 2019
- Dedicated to: Those who died in the Peterloo Massacre of 16 August 1819
- Website: peterloomassacre.org

The Peterloo Memorial is a memorial in Manchester, England, commemorating the Peterloo Massacre. It is sited close to the site of the massacre and was unveiled on 14 August 2019.

== Description ==
Toposcope on the monument

The Peterloo Memorial Campaign Group had been lobbying for a fitting memorial to the Peterloo Massacre for over ten years. In 2019, shortly before the 200th anniversary of the massacre, Manchester City Council "quietly unveiled" a new £1 million memorial by the artist Jeremy Deller. Designs for the memorial by Deller were first unveiled in November 2018.

The 1.8-metre-high and 11.6 metres wide memorial features 11 concentric steps engraved, sculpted from polished and inlaid British stone and carved with the names 18 of the victims and the places from which they came. The material not visible from the ground is reproduced at ground level, and there is a floor plaque.

The stone used includes "granites, sandstones, slates, and marbles from all regions of the UK and potentially further afield – places that would have been part of the British Empire in 1819". These include: Broughton Moor slate; Welsh Cwt-y-Bugail slate; Peak Moor sandstone; Cove red sandstone; DeLank granite; St Bees red sandstone; and Scottish dolerite.

== Response ==
The memorial was inaugurated at a large public gathering on 16 August 2019, widely reported in the press, covered extensively on regional TV and radio, and marked by a special edition of the Manchester Evening News. It has since become widely appreciated and visited, and the Peterloo Memorial Campaign site states that it is 'Proud to have campaigned for a respectful, informative and permanent Peterloo Memorial at the heart of Manchester'.

The lack of disabled access to the monument has been criticised. While the structure met the official standards for access, it was also interpreted by some as a 'speaking platform' made universally inaccessible by its stepped design. The city council explored modification options to try and rectify this, but it has proven very difficult to design a wheelchair ramp that does not damage or block substantial parts of the inscriptions.
