= Cinderloo Uprising =

1821 killings by British troops in Telford

- Date: 2 February 1821
- Location: Coalbrookdale Coalfield
- Caused by: Post-Napoleonic depression; Pay cuts
- Goals: Restoration of pay levels
- Methods: Strike action
- Result: Riot

Parties
Striking miners and their supporters	South Shropshire Yeomanry

Lead figures
Thomas Palin (alleged)	Lieutenant-Colonel Edward Cludde

Number
3,000+	

Casualties
- Deaths: 2 (plus one hanged subsequently)
- Charged: Thomas Palin (hanged); Samuel Hayward (reprieved); Seven others (hard labour)

The Cinderloo Uprising took place at Old Park in the Coalbrookdale Coalfield (present day Telford) on 2 February 1821, when the South Shropshire Yeomanry confronted a crowd of 3,000 mostly striking workers who had gathered to protest the continued lowering of their pay.

When requested to disperse following the reading of the Riot Act, the workers refused to do so, and pelted the Yeomanry with stones and lumps of cinders. In response the Yeomanry, led by Lieutenant Colonel Edward Cludde, opened fire on the crowd.

The uprising resulted in the deaths of three miners, two of whom were killed outright whilst another, Thomas Palin, was hanged for his participation in the disturbance on 7 April 1821.

The name Cinderloo derives from the similar Peterloo Massacre which had taken place in Manchester just 18 months beforehand. Peterloo had itself been named after the Battle of Waterloo which had ended the Napoleonic Wars.

== Background ==
The end of the Napoleonic Wars in 1815 brought with it a period of economic depression across the United Kingdom. Twinned with this, the Coalbrookdale Coalfields had begun to enter into a period of industrial stagnation and suffered competition from the iron works and coal production industries of South Wales and from the neighbouring Black Country.

Facing industrial decline and competition from more productive coalfields, local ironmasters, including men such as Thomas Botfield, made an illegal pact to reduce the pay of their workers by 6d per day in order to compensate for their losses, announcing to their workers on 31 January 1821 that the pay reductions were necessary on the grounds of 'stagnation of trade' and the falling value of iron.

== Collier strike ==
In response to the lowering of their wages, colliers across the Coalbrookdale Coalfields went on strike on 1 February 1821 in order to demonstrate their dissatisfaction with the reductions being made to their pay. Production across the area was halted. A large body of men marched to ironworks at Madeley Wood and Dawley, blowing out all the furnaces, damaging machinery, and inciting non-striking workers to join in.

The following day saw the strike continue. At that point it was considered necessary for county magistrates to call out the local yeomanry, initially two troops of the South Shropshire Yeomanry based at Wellington under command of Lieutenant-Colonel Cludde, to aid the civil power.

Striking colliers, many armed with sticks and bludgeons, left the ironworks at Donnington before moving on to halt the production of the furnaces at Old Park, about three miles from Wellington. Following this the crowd, now numbering between 300 and 400 people, moved on to the ironworks in Lightmoor, Dawley, and Horsehay. The striking colliers had intended to end their march at Coalbrookdale yet word of the strike had reached the Yeomanry. Instead of continuing on to the ironworks of Coalbrookdale the crowd returned to the furnaces at Old Park.

By this point the size of the strike had swelled to an estimated 3,000 people including many women and children.

== Arrival of the Yeomanry ==
By the mid afternoon the Yeomanry arrived to break up the crowd which had gathered at Old Park near two industrial spoil heaps known as the 'Cinders Hills'. As the magistrate, Thomas Eyton, began to read the Riot Act out to the crowd, ordering that they dissipate and return home, the mob refused to do so and the strikers responded by hurling rocks and cinders at the troops that had arrived to assist in their dispersal. An hour later the Yeomanry moved forward to arrest the ringleaders of the strike yet came under continued assault from the crowd. At this point Colonel Cludde gave the order for 'the cavalry to advance, to endeavour to disperse them'.

The advance made by the cavalry resulted in the arrest of eight strikers who were removed from the crowd and were prepared for transportation to nearby Wellington in order to stand trial. Yet when the Yeomanry began to transport those detained away from the strike they came under a relentless shower of stones and cinders. In the confusion two of those being transported away managed to escape. In retaliation Colonel Cludde gave the command for the Yeomanry to open fire on the crowd.

The Yeomanry opened fire on the crowd instantly killing William Bird, an 18 year old collier. By the time the crowd dispersed the Yeomanry had arrested the eight strikers. Another collier, Thomas Gittens, and possibly one other unnamed man, later died as a result of the wounds he received. Thomas Palin, singled out as the ringleader of the disturbances by the authorities, was later arrested after he sought treatment from a local doctor for a bullet wound he received.

An unknown number of strikers were wounded following the response of the local Yeomanry to the unrest. The Yeomanry reported a number of injuries as a result of the rocks and cinders hurled at them, however the most serious injury suffered by them came as a result of a misfired pistol going off in the holster of a cavalryman, injuring his leg.

== Aftermath ==
On 3 February, Colonel Cludde was sent reinforcements by a troop of his own regiment from Halesowen (then an exclave of Shropshire within Worcestershire), both troops of the separately commanded Shrewsbury Yeomanry cavalry, and staff from the county militia.

On 4 February military presence in the area was increased to prevent any further outbreaks of violence. Three troops of the South Shropshire Yeomanry were stationed in the coalfields alongside a troop of the 6th Dragoon Guards, who had arrived at Shifnal. This prevented the rioters assembling in large bodies although "numerous small parties spread themselves over the neighbourhood, begging, robbing and destroying property". The rioters gradually quietened, enabling the yeomanry troops to be sent home by 6 February.

The initial dispute which had caused the riot was resolved soon after, with some ironmasters agreeing to reduce the daily pay of the workers by 4d instead of 6d.

An inquest into the deaths of William Bird and Thomas Gittens resulted in a jury returning a verdict of justifiable homicide on 6 February.

Of the nine arrested, seven were sentenced to nine months hard labour whilst Thomas Palin and Samuel Hayward were sentenced to death by hanging for the crime of felonious riot. Hayward managed to secure a reprieve on 2 April and avoided the death sentence. Thomas Palin was executed for his role in the strike on 7 April.

== Legacy ==
The Cinderloo Uprising has been the subject of a number of songs. Notably the event forms the basis of the song "We've had enough" by local band Savannah.

A bridge connecting Telford Railway Station and Telford Town Centre has also been referred to as "Cinderloo Bridge" by some residents of the town.

In commemoration of the 200th anniversary of Cinderloo, Telford and Wrekin Council renamed a bridge on the Silkin Way "Cinderloo Bridge".
