= Yorkshire West Riding Revolt =

The Yorkshire West Riding Revolt of April 1820 was an uprising planned by working class radicals. It is thought to have been associated with Scottish uprisings, and occurred just as those arrested in the Peterloo Massacre and other reform demonstrations of 1819 were coming to trial. The desire for universal suffrage, annual elections and an end to the Corn Laws were the main motivation for radicals.

== Events ==
The news of Peterloo Massacre spread far and wide, with fairground booths as far away as Devon displaying detailed hand-coloured prints of the scene. There were protest meetings, which led to further arrests, and for a time rebellion appeared to threaten. In the spring of 1820 there was serious unrest in Yorkshire and armed rebellions in Ireland and Scotland; in Glasgow, a provisional government was optimistically proclaimed.

On 1 April, about 2,000 armed men approached the town of Huddersfield from four directions, with the intention of taking the town from the garrison stationed there. About 400 men within Huddersfield itself were part of the plan. However, for some reason the plan was aborted, the insurgents withdrew and returned to their homes and only four men were arrested, after the event.

On the evening of 11 April, a group of from 300 to 500 men from Barnsley and the nearby villages of Dodworth and Monk Bretton marched to Grange Moore, near Huddersfield. They believed that they were part of a rising postponed from 1 April and that they would meet with other groups and take Huddersfield. They carried arms and provisions, marched to a drum beat and carried political banners which they had used in meetings in 1819. On arriving at Grange Moore, they found that only about 20 men from Huddersfield had come to join them, and that the other towns had not mobilised. Most fled, and when the military arrived to confront them, they arrested a small group who did not resist.

In Sheffield, a simultaneous event did take place, although as on 1 April, a planned attack on a barracks was apparently aborted. About 200 armed men assembled, marched, split into two groups then reassembled in the Haymarket. They chanted ‘Hunt and Liberty’, ‘The Revolution, the Revolution’ and ‘All in the Mind for the Barracks’. Their leader, John Blackwell, symbolically fired off a pistol, but this was the only shot fired. The men simply dispersed.

At Halifax, as in Sheffield, there was a meeting of men who chanted loudly and fired off a rocket, before dispersing.

At Mirfield and Dewsbury there were general strikes.

On 12 April at Wigan in Lancashire, about 300 men assembled, thinking they were to be part of a general rising, but as in Grange Moore, dispersed in confusion.

Apparently the strategy had been to take towns and intercept the mail coaches in the North of England. The Scottish radicals would know that the uprising had begun when the mail coaches did not arrive, and begin their own. In Huddersfield, the plan had been to take the cavalry and infantry barracks, and shut up the principal civil people in their homes, before declaring an interim government.

== Arrests and trials ==
Four men were prosecuted as a result of the events on 1 April. John Peacock and John Lindley were transported to Van Diemen's Land and Nathaniel Buckely and Thomas Blackburn served two years imprisonment before being pardoned.

Twenty two men were prosecuted for High Treason as a result of the events of 12 April at Grange Moore. They admitted their actions and entered a group plea of guilty, relying on William Comstive, their leader, to be their spokesman. They were sentenced to death but recommended for mercy and the sentences were commuted to imprisonment or transportation to Van Diemen’s Land.

Eleven of the 22 were told they would be deported to Van Dieman's Land – the Australian penal colony which was later renamed Tasmania, while the rest were sent to the 'hulks'(prison ships). John Burkinshaw and his brother George Burkinshaw were among those charged with high treason. One pleaded guilty; the rest including John and George pleaded not guilty. The penalty if the charge was proved was death; however, they were told if they changed their plea to guilty, they would be spared. The guilty plea was subsequently entered and the death sentence was replaced with transportation – 11 of them, including John, for life and the remainder, including George, for 14 years. The ‘lifers’ were sent to Van Dieman’s Land.

Eleven arrived in 1820 on the 'Lady Ridley' and a twelfth transportee, Michael Downing, arrived on the 'Phoenix' in 1822.

John Blackwell was arrested for the events at Sheffield, in which he had acted a leader. He served 30 months in prison.

A few weavers were arrested as a result of the events at Wigan.
