= John Hetherington (haberdasher) =

Apocryphal British haberdasher

John Hetherington is an apocryphal English haberdasher. A frequently republished story from the late nineteenth century claims that in 1797 he invented the top hat and caused a riot by wearing it in public in London. However, top hats appeared in English fashion as early as the 1780s.

== The story ==
In 1899 the quarterly London journal Notes and Queries published a letter by a Richard H. Thornton of Portland, Oregon, quoting a "note from a recent number of the Hatters' Gazette (Note: A trade journal for hatmakers published in London since 1877.)". The note supposedly claims Hetherington as having decided to wear his invention of a "silk hat" in public on the 15th of January 1797 with the intention to "cause a sensation" only to be surrounded by a "howling mob".

The note claims to quote an unnamed gazette as having reported the following day that

John Hetherington... was arraigned before the Lord Mayor yesterday on a charge of breach of the peace and inciting to riot, and was required to give bonds in the sum of £500 (Note: Equivalent to £65,408 in 2023.) [for having] appeared upon the public highway wearing upon his head what he called a silk hat... a tall structure, having a shiny lustre, and calculated to frighten timid people.... several women fainted at the unusual sight, while children screamed, dogs yelped, and a young [boy] was thrown down by the crowd which had collected and had his right arm broken.

The note concludes by claiming to quote a comment in The Times published on 16 January 1797 approving of the hat and stating that it was "destined to work a revolution in headgear".
