= Robert Benson (barrister) =

English barrister (1797–1844)

- Born: 5 February 1797; Salisbury, Wiltshire, England
- Died: 21 June 1844 (aged 47); Salisbury, Wiltshire, England
- Occupation(s): Barrister, judge, author

Robert Benson (5 February 1797 – 21 June 1844) was a barrister and writer who served as recorder of Salisbury.

== Life ==
He was born in Salisbury as the youngest son of the Rev. Edmund Benson, priest-vicar of Salisbury Cathedral. He was educated at Trinity College, Cambridge, receiving his Bachelor of Arts in 1818 and his Master of Arts in 1821. He became a barrister in 1821 at the bar of the Middle Temple, and practised in the courts of equity. In 1823 he went to Corsica as one of the commissioners to carry out the bequests of former Corsican leader Pasquale Paoli. On his return Benson published a book called Sketches of Corsica; or a Journal written during a visit to that island in 1823, with an outline of its history and specimens of the language and poetry of the people (London, 1825).

He was elected deputy recorder of Salisbury in 1829, and became recorder in 1836. In 1837 he published a biography of the philosopher Arthur Collier, called Memoirs of the Life and Writings of the Rev. Arthur Collier. In 1843, a volume on the History of Salisbury was published as part of Sir Richard Colt Hoare's History of Modern Wiltshire. The volume carried Benson's name along with that of Henry Hatcher, another resident of Salisbury, as the authors. However, Benson wrote only a very small portion of the book, which created a controversy between him and Hatcher.

Benson died unmarried at the house of his only surviving sister on 21 June 1844, and was buried in Salisbury Cathedral with the other members of his family.
