= Tommaso Benedetti =

Italian painter (1797–1863)

Tommaso Benedetti (1797–1863) was an English-born Austrian painter of Italian descent. He was born in London, went early to Vienna, where he lived for the remainder of his life.

Among his engravings are:

- Two Portraits of the Emperor Francis I after Amerling and after Kupelwieser.
- Portrait of Duke of Reichstadt; after Daffinger,
- Portrait of the Archduke Charles of Austria; after Kriehuber.
- The Entombment and Madonna with Cherries after Titian.

== Sources ==
- Bryan, Michael (1886). Robert Edmund Graves (ed.). Dictionary of Painters and Engravers, Biographical and Critical. Vol. I: A-K. London: George Bell and Sons. p. 110.
