= Henry Noble Shipton =

British junior officer (1797–1821)

- Born: 27 June 1797; Portishead, Somerset
- Died: 5 December 1821 (aged 24); Barbados
- Military career
- Allegiance: United Kingdom
- Branch: Royal Navy; British Army
- Service years: 1812–1821
- Rank: Second Lieutenant (Navy); Ensign (Army)
- Units: Royal Marines (1812–1815); 4th (The King's Own) Regiment of Foot (1815 – 1821)
- Conflicts: War of 1812; Battle of New Orleans; Second Battle of Fort Bowyer; Napoleonic Wars; Battle of Waterloo

Henry Noble Shipton (27 June 1797 – 5 December 1821) was a British junior officer who served in the Royal Marines and the Army. He is notable as being the sole Royal Marine to have fought at the Battle of Waterloo.

== Biography ==
Shipton was baptized at Portishead, Somerset, on 27 June 1797, the son of Reverend John Shipton and his wife Jane. Upon leaving Blundell's School in 1812, he joined the armed forces. He commenced his military career in the Woolwich Division of the Royal Marines, and was commissioned as a second lieutenant on 12 May 1812. He served on Pembroke from 26 September 1812 until the ship was paid off on 22 August 1814.

In October 1814, he was sent with sixteen other officers as a draft of reinforcements to North America. He embarked Statira with 10 other officers and 38 other ranks, and was disembarked in Louisiana on 29 December. In line with their motto, 'Per Mare, Per Terram', Royal Marines served not only afloat in the ships of the fleet but the ship's Royal Marines detachments were often landed under the command of their own officers and combined to fight as infantry company's or even Battalions in support of land operations. In this manner, Shipton was present with the 4th Foot at the Battle of New Orleans, and at the Second Battle of Fort Bowyer in February 1815.

He embarked Tonnant, and returned to Europe in May 1815, as did the 1st battalion of the 4th Foot. He had a gained recommendation for a commission into the army by General John Lambert, and therefore he tendered his resignation to the Royal Marines. The path of advancement for officers in the Royal Marines at this time was very slow, promotion required both seniority (or time served) in rank, experience and the patronage of high-ranking sponsors. Shipton is reported to have struck up a good rapport with the officers of the 4th, he also gained General Lambert as a sponsor, indicating that his career prospects looked better in an army regiment than in the Royal Marines. Furthermore, given that a lengthy land war in Europe seemed imminent (rather than what became a 100-day campaign), it made perfect sense – from a career point of view – to resign his commission as a Second Lieutenant Royal Marines, and to become an Ensign in the army.

During this time, the 4th Foot participated in the Hundred Days campaign. During this time, he served alongside 4th Foot in a capacity similar to that of a naval volunteer of the first class (see Thomas Fortescue Kennedy for an example). He was awarded a Waterloo Medal for having served on the staff of the 4th Foot as an ensign. At this time he was technically in the Royal Marines and is believed to be the sole Royal Marine recipient of this medal.

He continued to appear as a second lieutenant on the monthly Steel's Navy List up to July 1815. He was commissioned into the Army on 3 August 1815 as an ensign. The subsequent reduction in the establishment of the Army resulted in him being on half-pay during 1816 and 1817. He resumed active service on full pay on 19 November 1818. He died of yellow fever in Barbados on 5 December 1821 aged 24, although his gravestone incorrectly states he died at the age of 26.
