= Coalbrookdale Coalfield =

Former coalfield in Shropshire, England

Coordinates: 52.6385°N 2.4695°W

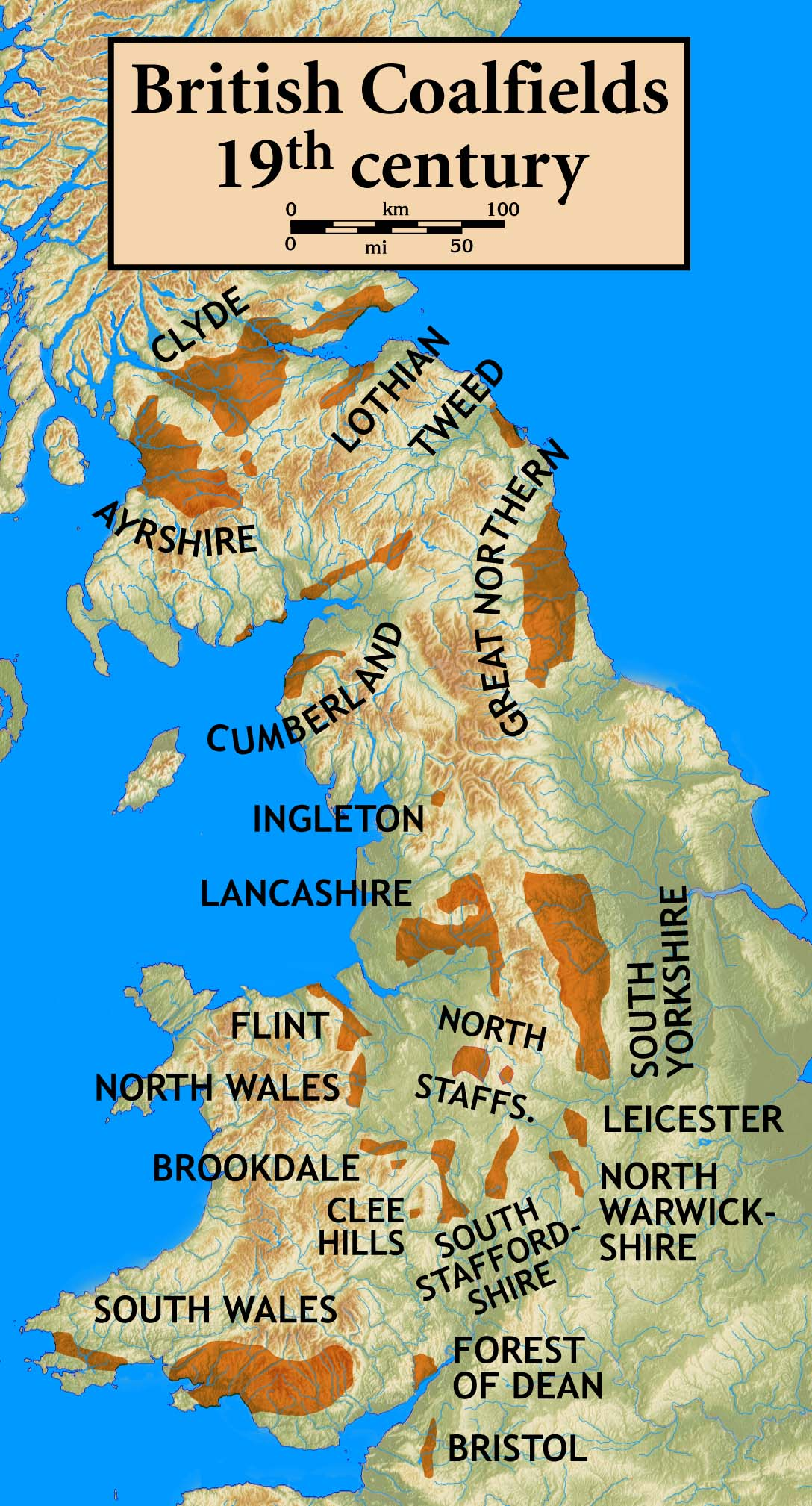

The Coalbrookdale Coalfield is a coalfield in Shropshire in the English Midlands. It extends from Broseley in the south, northwards to the Boundary Fault which runs northeastwards from the vicinity of The Wrekin past Lilleshall. The former coalfield has been built on by the new town of Telford.

== History ==
Coal-mining in the area is believed to have been undertaken by the Romans, as the coalfield lay on Watling Street. Mining activity was first documented in the 13th and 14th centuries, when the monks at Buildwas Abbey were granted the right to coal and ironstone by Phillip de Benthall. Although the coalfield only covers an area of 25 square miles (65 km^{2}), it has been noted as being historically significant on account of its location with the ironstone seams, that allowed Abraham Darby I, in 1708 to make iron more efficiently using coke, rather than charcoal, thereby starting the Industrial Revolution. The River Severn also allowed for delivery of goods made in his works in Coalbrookdale.

During the late 16th and early 17th centuries, the Coalbrookdale Coalfield was second only to the North East Coalfield in terms of volume and it was producing 95% of the coal in the Shropshire area.

By 1896, the Coalbrookdale Coalfield had over 80 mines operating in the district; whilst most of these worked coal, some also worked the bands of fireclay too. Some of the fireclay was of such quality that it was used for the manufacture of pottery and clay tobacco pipes. Not all of the mines were very deep, some were described as surface mines, but the deep-mining industry in the coalfield peaked in the mid-19th century, with the last coal mine, Granville, being closed in 1979. Surface mining (opencasting), has been more prevalent in the western edge of the coalfield around Lawley, Little Wenlock and north of the River Severn at Ironbridge.

== Geology ==
Coal-bearing strata are to be found across three synclines; the Donnington, Madeley and Coalport synclines whilst the majority of the coalfield is subject to intense faulting.

The following coal seams are recognised:^{[13]}

Middle Coal Measures
- Fungus Good quality coal, widely worked, no partings, commonly washed out. (0.1 - 1.3m)
- Blackstone, Deep, Gur Only Deep worked and not widely, (0.2 - 0.6m), (0.7 - 1.9m), (0.7 - 0.8m)
- Top Good quality coal, widely worked, no partings (0.6 - 2.1m)
- Three Quarter Little worked (0.2 - 2.8m)
- Double Thickest seam in Sequence, extensively worked, locally split (0.4 - 2.3m)
- Yard Good quality, consistent thickness, widely worked (0.6 - 1.4m)
- Big Flint Widely worked (0.3 - 1,8m)

Lower Coal Measures
- New Mine Widely worked, sulphurous, commonly parted (0.3 - 2.1m)
- Clunch or Viger in Madeley Syncline Worked only where thick (0.3 - 1.4m)
- Two Foot or Ganey in Madeley Syncline Good quality coking coal, widely worked, 2 or 3 seams (0.1 - 1.2m)
- Best, Randle, Clod Good coals, widely worked (0.1 - 2m), (0.1 - 2m), (0.1 - 1.5m)
- Little Flint Usually lowest worked seam, widely worked. (0.2 - 1.2m)
- Crawstone Not worked (0 - 0.3m)
- Lancashire Ladies. Rarely worked a single seam (0.1 - 0.5m)

The coalfield extends from Broseley in the south west of the region to Lilleshall in the north east and is described as being roughly in a triangular shape. Whilst it is thought that the coalfield extends towards, and into, the Staffordshire Coalfield, no mining for coal was undertaken east of the village of Shifnal.

== Modern day ==
With most of the coal mines worked out by the 1960s, the idea of a new town was born, and although it was originally called Dawley New Town, Telford sprang up over the old coalfield. Mining continued into the 21st century, but was all of an opencasting nature. The site at Granville Colliery was transformed into Granville Country Park.

== See also ==
- List of coalfields
