= Manchester city centre =

Central business district in Manchester, Greater Manchester, England

Coordinates: 53°28′51″N 2°14′33″W

- Central business district
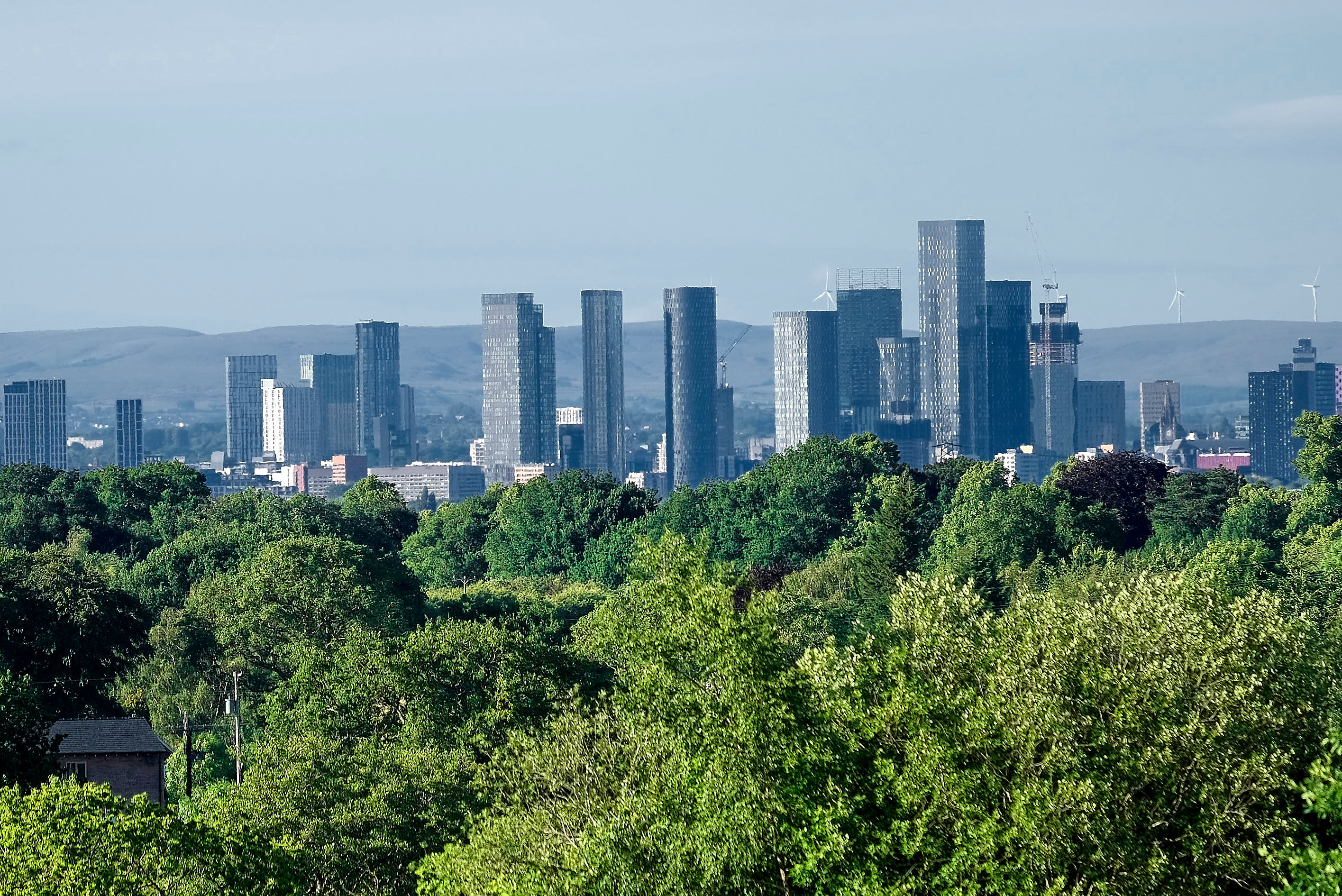
- Skyline of Manchester City Centre, 2025

- Location within Greater Manchester
- Population: 17,861 (2011)
- OS grid reference: SJ839980
  - London: 163 mi (262 km) SE
- Metropolitan borough: Manchester
- Metropolitan county: Greater Manchester
- Region: North West
- Country: England
- Sovereign state: United Kingdom
- Post town: Manchester
- Postcode district: M1, M2, M3, M4
- Dialling code: 0161
- Police: Greater Manchester
- Fire: Greater Manchester
- Ambulance: North West
- UK Parliament: Manchester Central

Manchester city centre is the central business district of Manchester, England, within the confines of Great Ancoats Street, A6042 Trinity Way, and A57(M) Mancunian Way, which collectively form the inner ring road. The City Centre ward had a population of 17,861 at the 2011 census.

Manchester city centre evolved from the civilian vicus of the Roman fort of Mamucium, on a sandstone bluff near the confluence of the rivers Medlock and Irwell. This became the township of Manchester during the Middle Ages, and was the site of the Peterloo Massacre of 1819. Manchester was granted city status in 1853, after the Industrial Revolution, from which the city centre emerged as the global centre of the cotton trade which encouraged its "splendidly imposing commercial architecture" during the Victorian era, such as the Royal Exchange, the Corn Exchange, the Free Trade Hall, and the Great Northern Warehouse. After the decline of the cotton trade and the Manchester Blitz, the city centre suffered economic decline during the mid-20th century, but the CIS Tower ranked as the tallest building in the UK when completed in 1962.

The city centre acts as the transport interchange for Greater Manchester and over 7 million people live within an hour's drive of it. The 1996 Manchester bombing provided the impetus for the redevelopment of the city centre and an upturn in retail, leisure, offices and urban living. The economy of the city centre is built primarily on retail and services, accounting for nearly 40% of grade-A city centre office space outside London.

== History ==
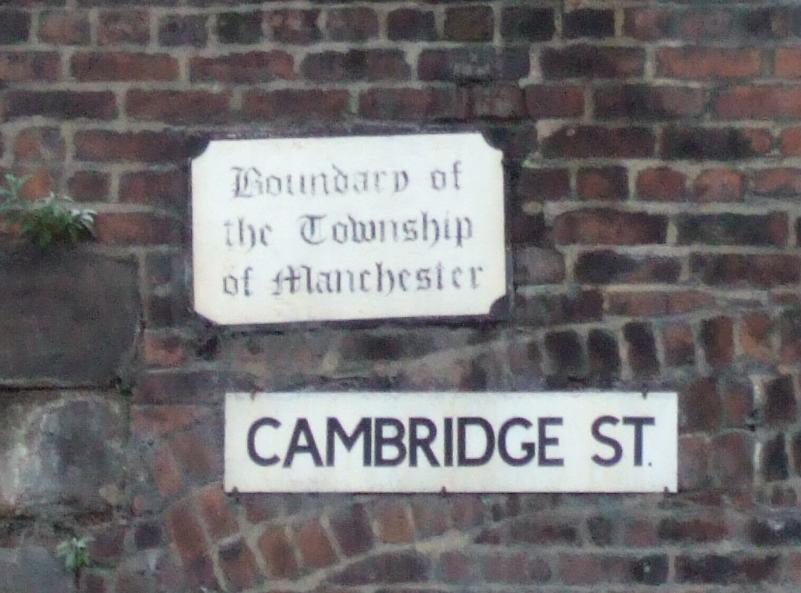
One of the boundary signs of the former township of Manchester on the banks of the Medlock

Manchester evolved from the civilian vicus associated with the Roman fort of Mamucium, which was established c. AD 79 on a sandstone bluff near the confluence of the rivers Medlock and Irwell, in a position defensible from the Brigantes. Once the Romans had abandoned Britain, the focus of settlement shifted to the confluence of the rivers Irwell and Irk. During the Dark Ages which followed – and persisted until the Norman Conquest – the settlement was in the territory of several different petty kingdoms. In the Middle Ages, what is now the city centre was the township of Manchester.

Manchester Castle – a medieval fortification, probably taking the form of a ringwork – was located on a bluff where the rivers Irk and Irwell meet. The castle was first mentioned in 1184 and recorded in 1215 as belonging to the barons of Manchester, the Grelley family. It has been described as "of no political or military importance". The Grelleys replaced the castle with a fortified manor house, which in turn was replaced by a college of priests (founded in 1421). In 1547 the college was dissolved and the property acquired by the Earl of Derby and early in the reign of King Charles II it was sold to the governors who had been appointed in the will of Humphrey Chetham. By royal charter in 1665 Chetham's Hospital was established and this became Chetham's School of Music.

== Governance ==
Manchester city centre is part of the Manchester Central parliamentary constituency, represented by Member of Parliament (MP) Lucy Powell, from the Labour Co-op Party.

The City Centre local electoral ward was divided in 2018 between two new wards, Deansgate and Piccadilly.

== Geography ==
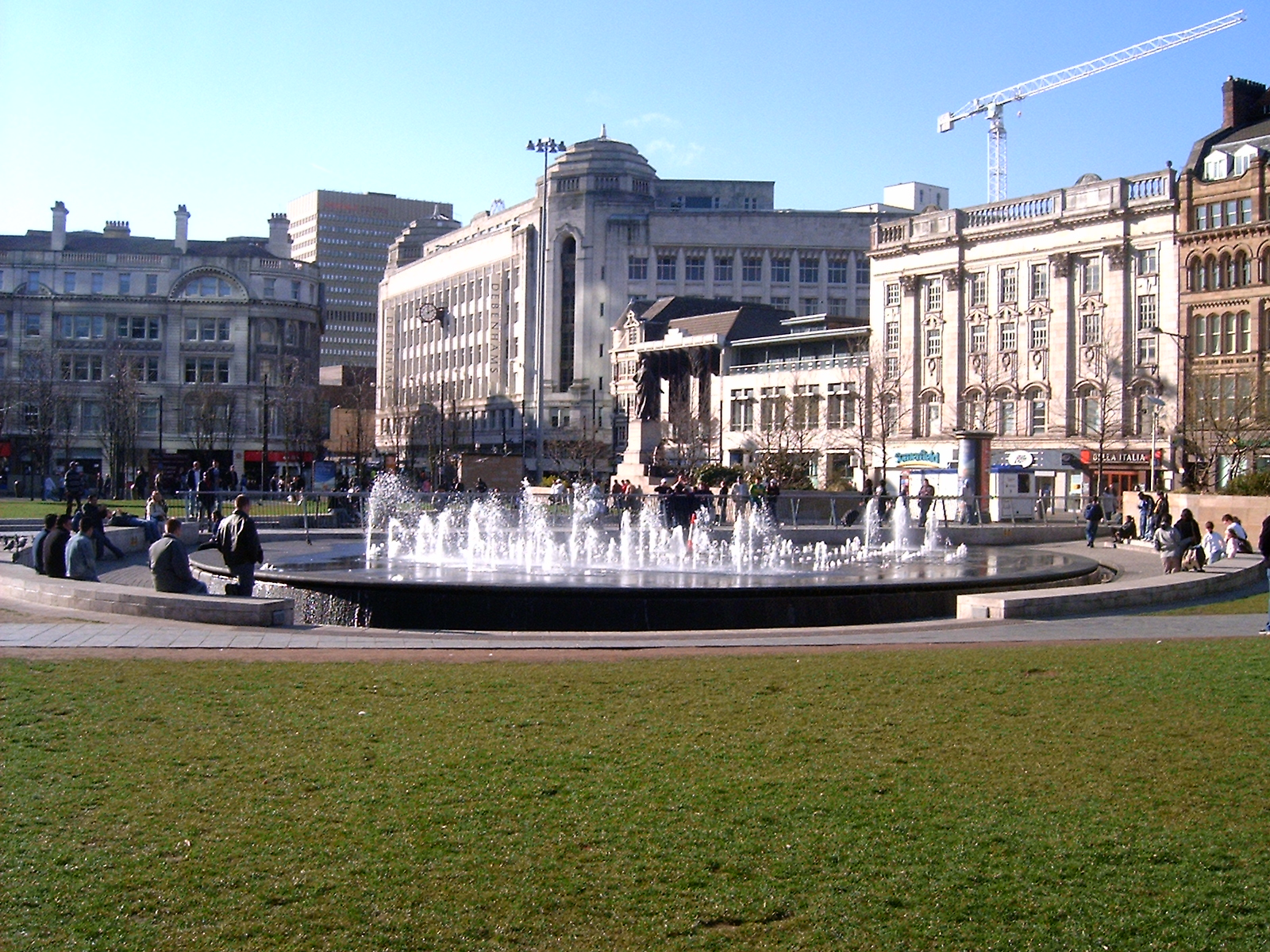
Piccadilly Gardens, a green space in the city (view towards Market Street)

The city centre has variously been defined as those parts of the city within the Manchester Inner Ring Road, or else the entire area within Manchester's Inner Ring Road, thereby encompassing a part of the administratively separate City of Salford, and an area of Oxford Road to the south. Political and economic ties between the city centre and neighbouring Salford and Trafford have strengthened with the shift from town and district centres to metropolitan-level centres in England. Manchester city centre is the commercial heart of Greater Manchester and with adjoining parts of Salford and Trafford is defined as its Regional Centre for urban planning and public transport purposes.

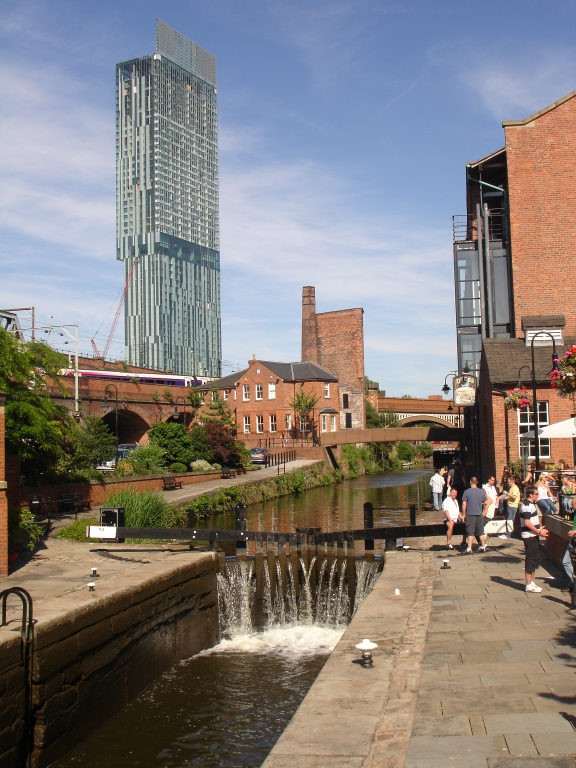
Castlefield retains much of its industrial character which is juxtaposed by modern buildings.

There is little order due to the manner in which the city rapidly developed during the Industrial Revolution nor much agreement on the differing areas in Manchester city centre. However many areas and streets in the city centre have a distinctive character with identifiable clusters of industrial warehouses, civic buildings and modern developments. Many of these distinctive areas are covered in 14 city centre conservation areas which are defined by Manchester City Council.

These are essential ingredients to the City's sense of place, providing aesthetic quality and strong references to the City's past, which will always be a central part of Manchester's character. Development which fails to respond to the opportunities that this context affords should not be supported. Recent development, including Urbis and the Courts of Justice, has demonstrated how modern architecture of the highest standard can succeed alongside the established built fabric of the City Centre.

— Manchester City Council planning policy on conservation areas in the city centre,

=== Castlefield ===
Castlefield is an area in the extreme southwest between Deansgate and the River Irwell with the sites of the Roman fort and Liverpool Road railway station. It retains much of its industrial character and is the only Urban Heritage Park in the United Kingdom, and is marked by its mercantile 19th warehouses and adjoining wharfs which were used to transport goods from Manchester during the Manchester's industrial era. Today, Castlefield is quiet and noted for its waterside bars and pubs. Notable structures include Manchester Liverpool Road station which was the first inter-city railway station on the opening of the Liverpool and Manchester Railway in 1830. Today the station frontage remains and is a grade I listed building, as is the adjoining 1830s warehouse. The structure now forms part of the Museum of Science and Industry (MOSI). For many years Castlefield was on a tentative list for UNESCO World Heritage Status for its industrial past – particularly in regards to the development of the canal as a mode of transportation and the railway.

=== Northern Quarter ===
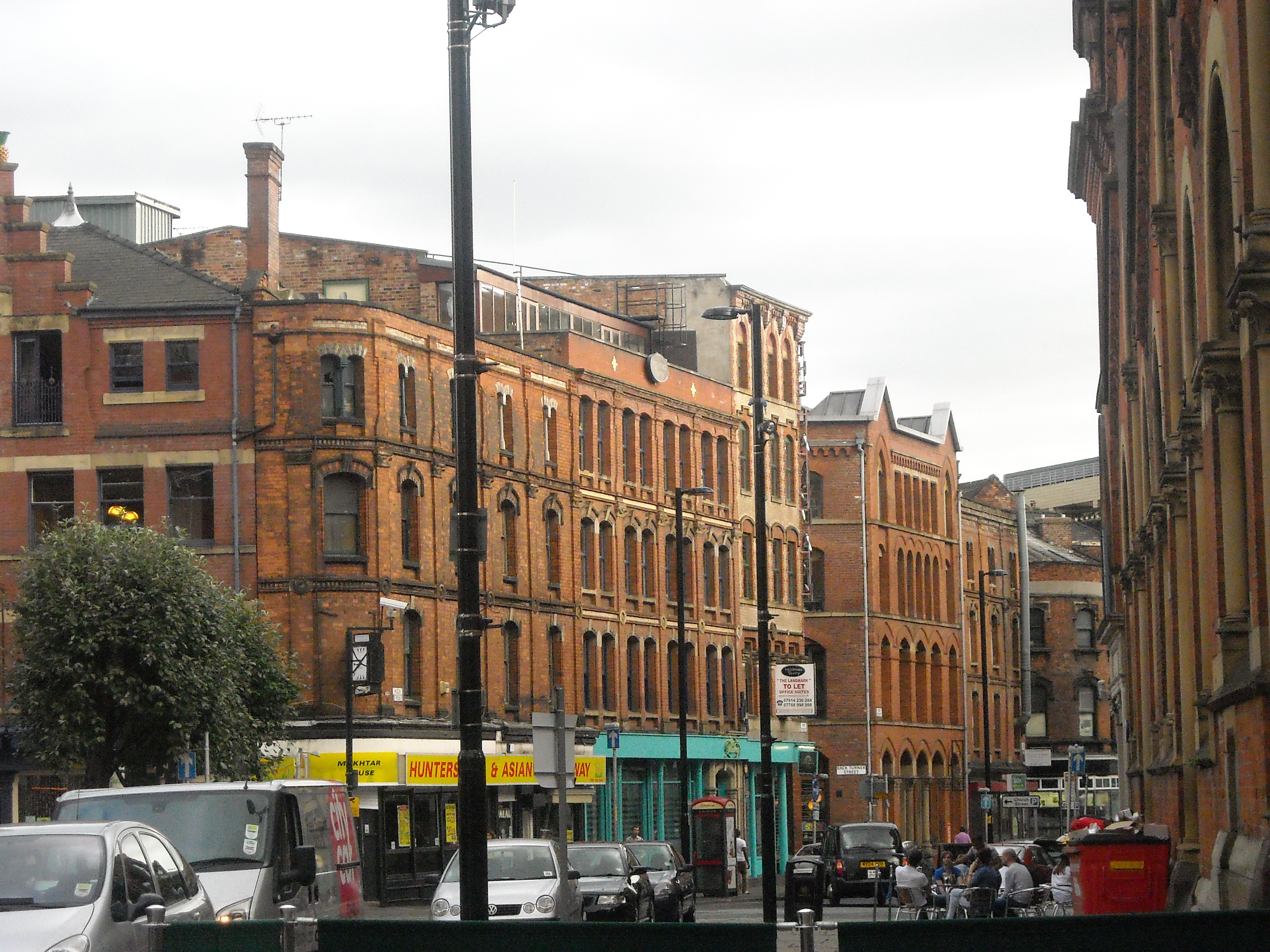
The Northern Quarter is known for its warehouses and considered a bohemian part of the city centre.

The Northern Quarter is in the north east and is known as a hub for alternative and bohemian culture in Manchester. Previously the area was the retail heart of the city centre, but with the opening of the Manchester Arndale in the 1970s patronage gradually dwindled and vacant buildings were commonplace. In the late 1980s the area was renamed as the Northern Quarter in the hope that the area would be reincarnated from the ground up. Following the boom of the late 90s and early 2000s the area has become a popular destination for shops, bars, restaurants and nightclub – many of which have an independent ethos.

=== Central retail district ===
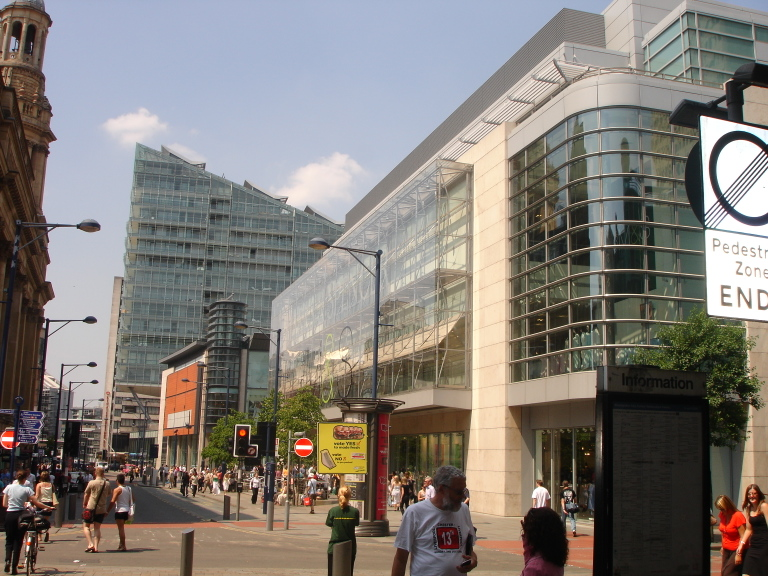
Market Street

The opening of the Manchester Arndale in 1975 shifted the retail focus towards the area bounded by Market Street, Corporation Street, Withy Grove and High Street. Despite the Arndale's unpopularity with many critics, it has been described as an outstandingly successful shopping centre by visitor numbers and spending. Today the Arndale attracts 41 million visitors a year and is the largest city centre shopping centre in the United Kingdom.

The area has been extensively redeveloped after the IRA bomb of 1996 and contains Manchester Cathedral, Shambles Square, Exchange Square and Cathedral Gardens, as well as shopping streets Market Street and King Street. Since the bomb, Selfridges, Marks & Spencer and NEXT have opened dedicated large stores in the area. Not all shops are strictly in the retail area with many in Deansgate and King Street – a short walk from the area.

=== Spinningfields ===
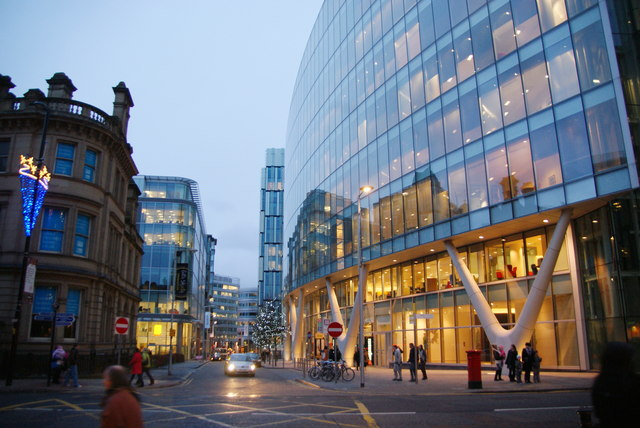
Spinningfields is the designated business district in the city centre.

Spinningfields is an area in the west adjoining the middle part of Deansgate and the main business district of the city centre. The proposal to create a designated central business district originated in 1997 when Allied London purchased a number of buildings around the John Rylands Library. Allied London executive Mike Ingall was convinced of the site's regeneration potential and Manchester City Council was keen to redevelop the city centre after the 1996 Manchester bombing. The development, named from a narrow street which ran westwards from Deansgate, is bounded by Bridge Street to the north, Quay Street to the south, Deansgate to the east, and the River Irwell to the west.

The area is noted for glazed, modern buildings – many of which are offices. In 2010, Spinningfields accounted for 35% of the city centre prime office space with 44 commercial organisations employing nearly 20,000 people. Notable buildings in the area include 1 The Avenue, 3 Hardman Street and the Civil Justice Centre – short-listed for the Stirling Prize and noted as a landmark building for its distinctive cantilevers. Future buildings include the Cotton Building and construction commenced in summer 2014 and will be completed by 2016. Construction on a new 90-metre office tower, 1 Spinningfields could also commence in 2015 after securing a pre-let in late 2014.

Aside from offices, Spinningfields was home to a number of high end retail units such as Armani and Mulberry. However, with the main retail district being on the opposite side of the city centre, these units struggled. In recent years the district has cultivated a far more successful image in the food and drink offering with a number of popular restaurants and bars in the area. Footfall, particularly in the evening after work hours, has increased, and revenue from retail and leisure in Spinningfields has risen from £10 million in 2008 to £50 million in 2014.

=== Piccadilly ===
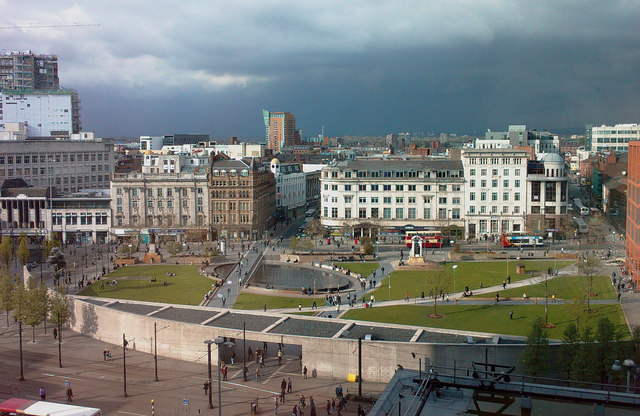
Piccadilly Gardens from City Tower

Piccadilly is the transport interchange of the city centre with rail, tram and bus services all within a five-minute walk. The area is typically busy with pedestrians commuting to and from the city centre. The area is dominated by Piccadilly Gardens. It is the largest public square in the centre which was redeveloped in the early 2000s but not to a universally positive reception. For over 150 years Manchester Royal Infirmary was located on the site but closed in 1914. A few years after closure the hospital was demolished and public space was created with a landscaped garden set into the ground – hence the name. The area is served by Piccadilly Gardens tram stop and one of the city centre's main bus stations, Piccadilly Gardens bus station, which has over 20 stands. Most of the stands are located on the south-west side of the square with the rest on the north side.

=== Peter's Fields (Civic Quarter) ===
Peter's Fields (Civic Quarter)
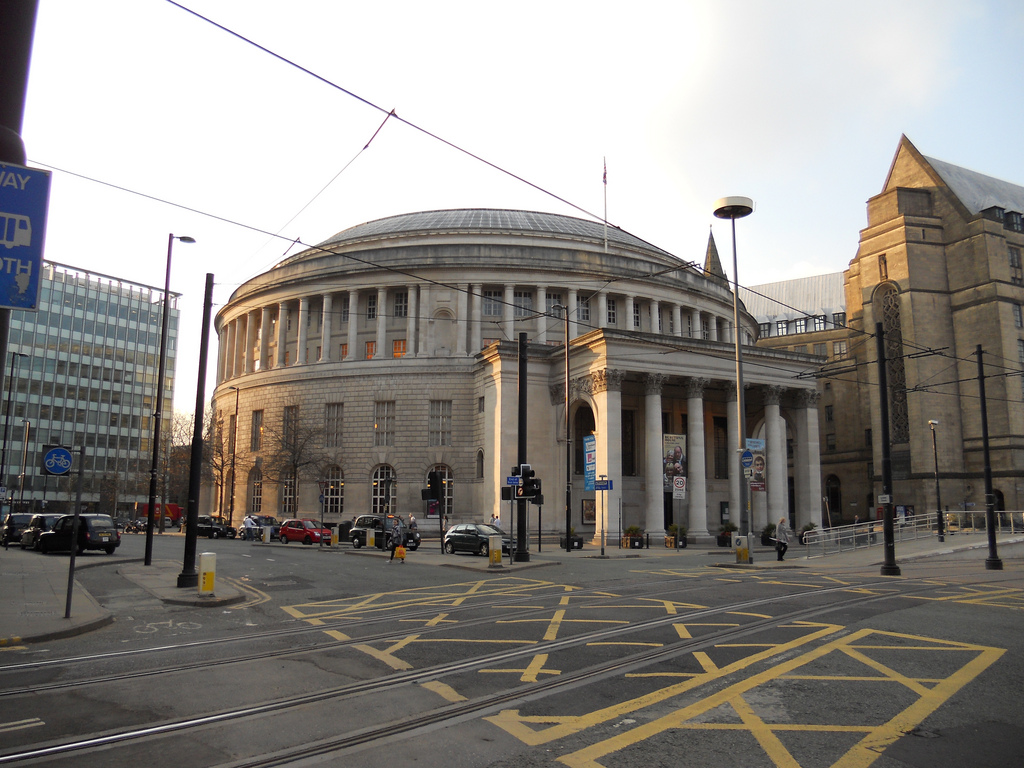
Manchester Central Library

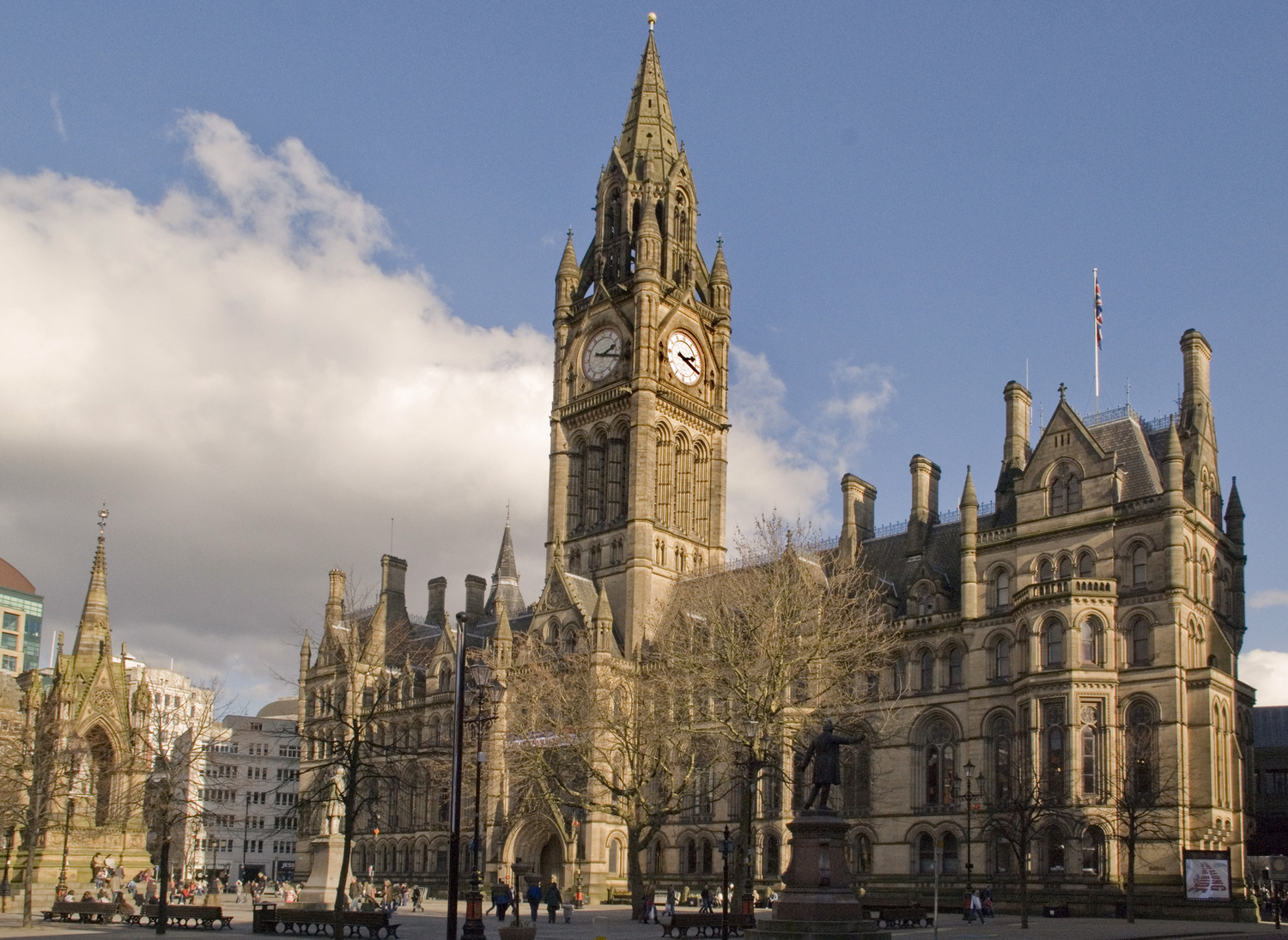
Manchester Town Hall

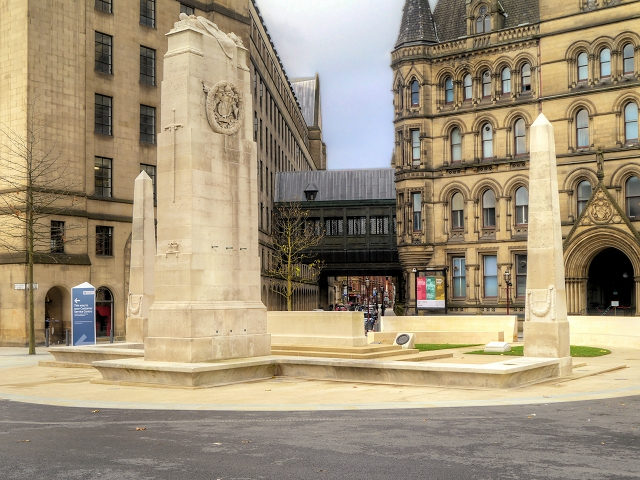
The Cenotaph

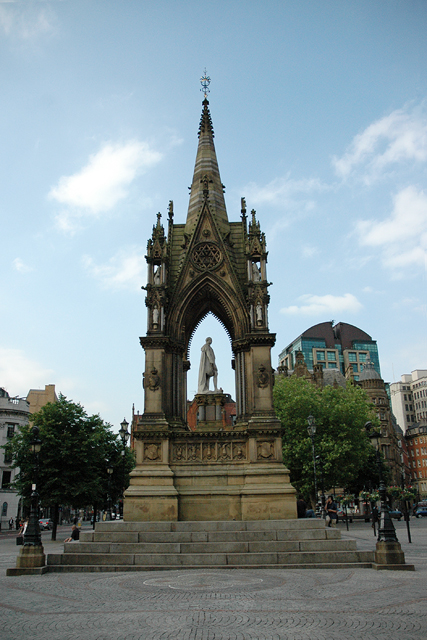
Albert Square, Manchester

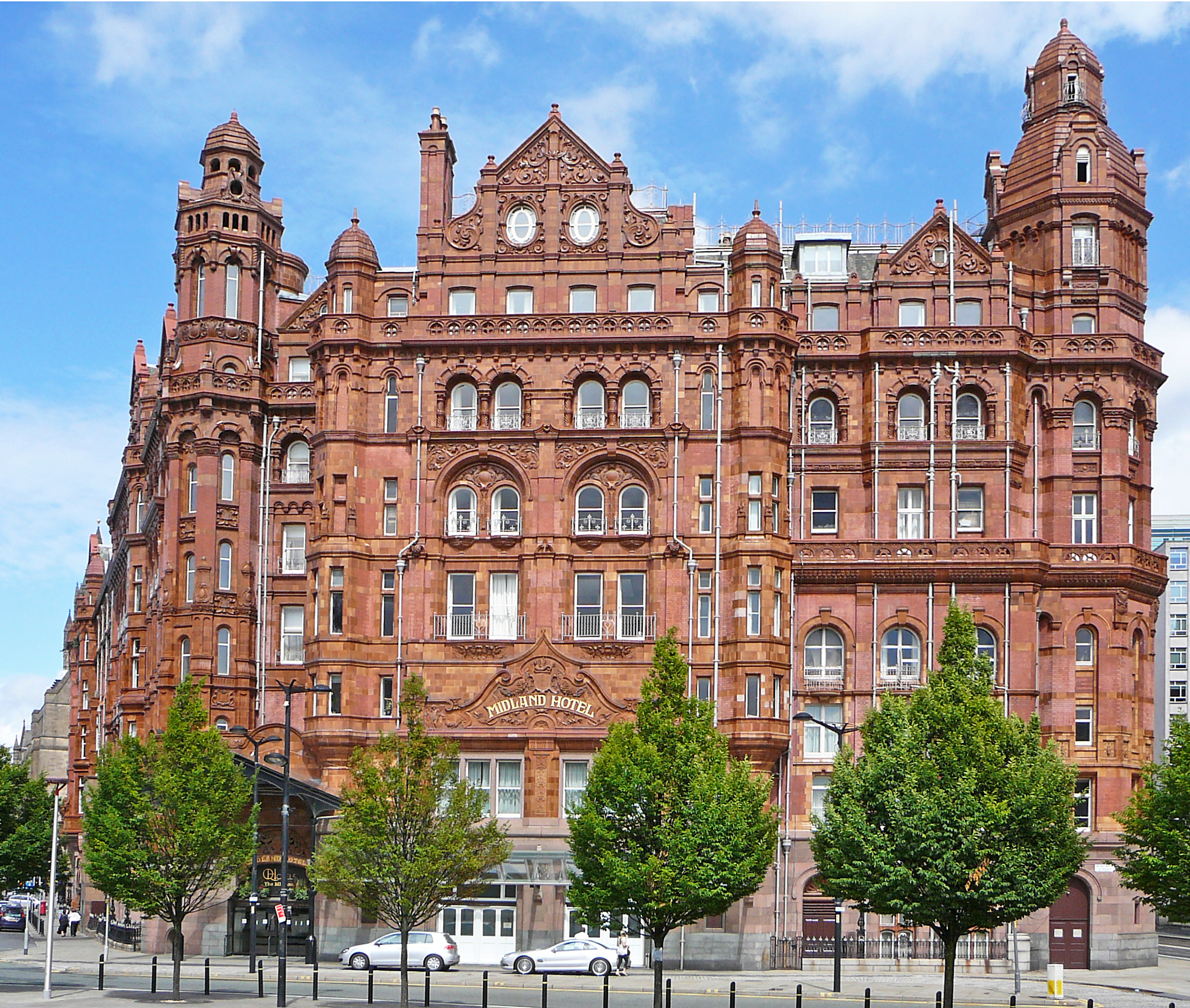
Midland Hotel

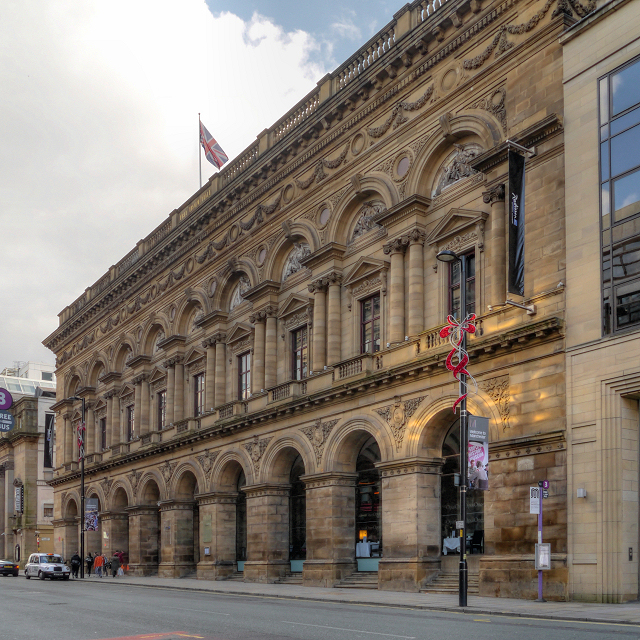
The Free Trade Hall

Peter's Fields, now known as St Peter's Square sits at the top of Oxford Road and Peter Street and extends east towards Princess Street. It is noted for its purpose as a civic area and includes important buildings and monuments such as Central Library, Midland Hotel, YMCA Building, Manchester Town Hall and Town Hall Extension – all of which are listed. It is described by Manchester City Council as "perhaps the greatest collective accolade to Manchester's original modern heritage". The square is famous for the Peterloo Massacre in 1819 when cavalry charged into a crowd of 60,000–80,000 that had gathered to demand the reform of parliamentary representation on what was previously fields – hence the name Peter's Fields. A monument to commemorate the nationally importantly event in the struggle for suffrage is expected to be commissioned for 2019 to mark the 200th anniversary of the massacre. In recent years, the square has been redeveloped with new high-rise office buildings, One St Peter's Square and Two St Peter's Square with further buildings approved for the derelict Odeon site and London Scottish House adjacent to the Midland Hotel. As part of the redevelopment, the Cenotaph was relocated outside Manchester Town Hall in 2014 and St Peter's Square tram stop was redeveloped with an additional platform and new configuration in 2016.

=== Chinatown ===
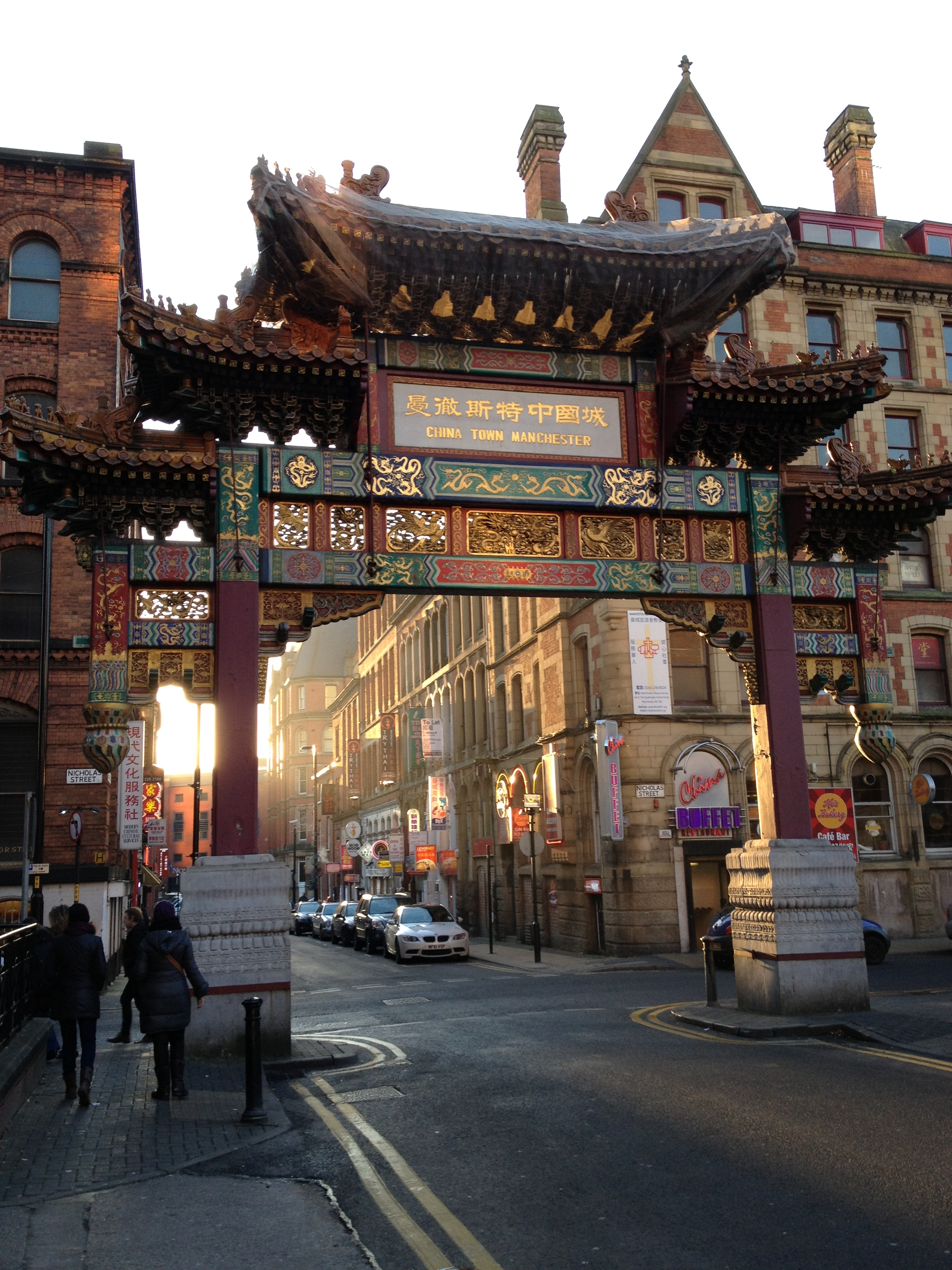
The paifang in Chinatown

Manchester's Chinatown is an area to the south of Piccadilly Gardens with many oriental restaurants and other facilities of a far eastern character. It is the second largest Chinatown in the United Kingdom and the third largest in Europe. The first settlers to arrive in the city came in the early 20th century; according to the BBC, "Many arrived alone and were engaged in what was seen as the traditional trade of laundries." Manchester's first Chinese restaurant, Ping Hong, opened on Mosley Street in 1948, on the eve of a Chinese immigration wave that would commence during the 1950s. Manchester did not have a significant Chinese population, reaching only about 2,000. However, after World War II, there were severe labour shortages, and in response, the government passed the British Nationality Act 1948, which allowed easier access into the country. Additionally, Hong Kong's rapid urbanisation meant that many farmers and traditional residents' homes were being destroyed by the urban sprawl, so many decided to migrate. The area's beginnings are rooted in the restaurant business, as many Chinese restaurants surfaced soon after the immigration boom. By the 1970s other Chinese businesses began to emerge, such as medicine shops, Chinese supermarkets, as well as financial and legal services, all serving the employees of the expanding number of Chinese restaurants in the area. The area has retained a far eastern character ever since and in 1987 a paifang archway was installed to as a gift to the Chinese community and to reflect the far eastern heritage of the area.

=== Canal Street ===
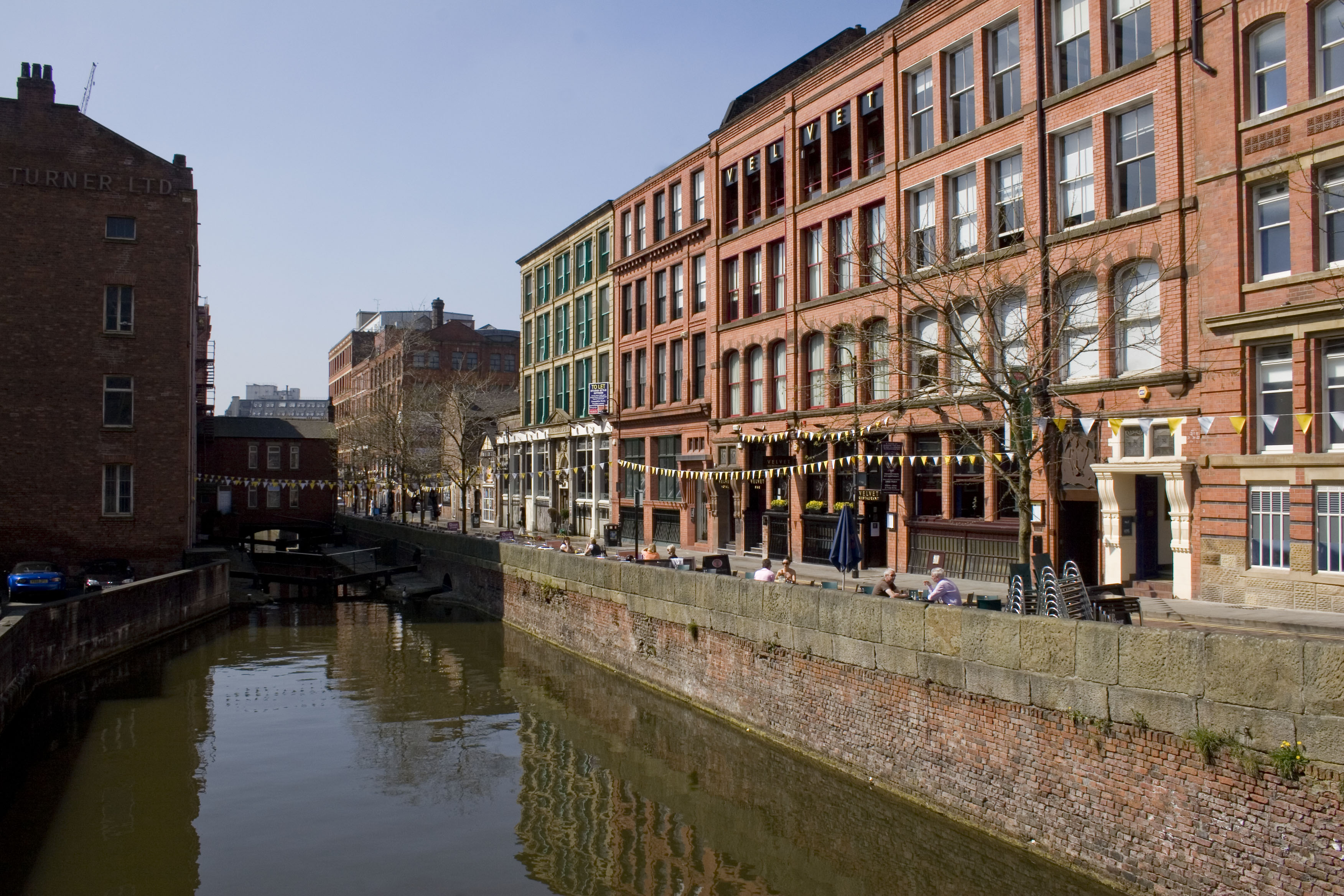
Canal Street

Canal Street, known as the gay village, is a part of the centre east of Portland Street and west of Whitworth Street through which runs the Rochdale Canal; it contains many bars, clubs and other facilities – many of which are focused towards the LGBT community. The area has long been associated with the gay community with links going back to the early 20th century when homosexuality was still illegal. During the industrial years the area was a red light district.

=== Victoria North ===
Victoria North is a new town in the city centre of which the landmark development is the Victoria Riverside project.

== Demography ==
Central ward at the 2001 UK census
Demographic	Central	City of Manchester	England
Total population	11,689	392,819	49,138,831
White	82.0%	81.0%	91.0%
Asian	4.3%	9.1%	4.6%
Black	2.8%	4.5%	2.3%
Chinese or other	8.0%	2.7%	0.9%
Mixed	2.8%	3.2%	1.3%

At the 2001 UK census, the political ward of "Central", which covers an area of 2.14 square miles (5.54 km^{2}), had a population of 11,689 with a population density of 5,460 inhabitants per square mile (2,108/km^{2}). While this was lower than the population density for the whole city (8,798 inhabitants per square mile (3,397/km^{2})), the proportion of land dedicated to domestic buildings was lower in the ward than in the whole city (6.7% compared to 8.0%). There was a female-to-male ratio of 100 to 113, much higher than the 100 to 95 ratio for all England. Of those over 16 years old, 65.7% were single (never married), 13.7% married, and 8.7% divorced; this was significantly different from the national figures of 30.2% single, 43.5% married, and 8.2% divorced. The ward's 6,188 households included 61.1% one-person, 8.6% married couples living together, 9.0% were co-habiting couples, and 12.4% single parents with their children; compared to national figures, there was a high proportion of single person households, and a low proportion of married couples living together. Of those aged 16–74, 30.5% had no academic qualifications, lower than the figure for the City of Manchester (34.0%) but slightly above that of the whole of England (28.9%). The ward had a significantly higher percentage of adults with a diploma or degree than the city or England as a whole. Of the ward's residents aged 16–74, 26.3% had an educational qualification such as first degree, higher degree, qualified teacher status, qualified medical doctor, qualified dentist, qualified nurse, midwife, or health visitor, compared to 21.4% in Manchester and 19.9% nationwide.

== Economy ==
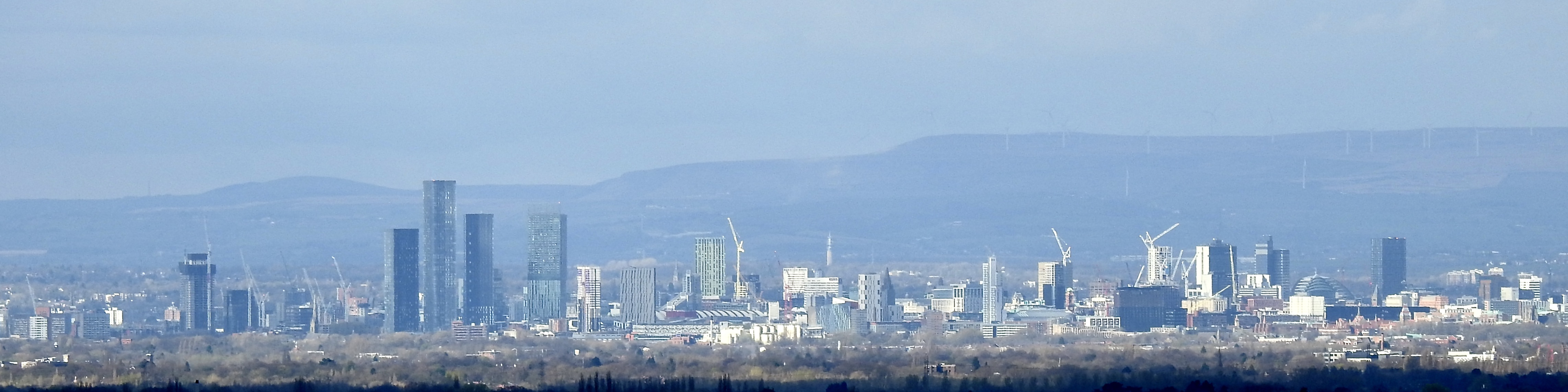
Manchester city centre skyline from Werneth Low in 2020

Deansgate and Market Street are the centre's principal retail streets and King Street (with high-class shops) and St Ann's Square are known for their specialist fashion and other shops. There is also a large indoor shopping mall called the Manchester Arndale Centre. Manchester city centre has several large department stores including Marks and Spencer on Market Street, House of Fraser (formerly Kendals) on Deansgate, Harvey Nichols on New Cathedral Street and Selfridges in Exchange Square. There are many leisure facilities in the city centre including the Printworks, a large facility containing a cinema (including an IMAX screen), numerous bars, clubs and restaurants and also Manchester's first Hard Rock Cafe. The Northern Quarter, centred on Oldham Street, is known for its Bohemian atmosphere and independent shops and cafes. The landscaping of the city centre has provided several public spaces including Piccadilly Gardens, which incorporates fountains, green spaces, a concrete pavilion designed by Tadao Ando, and a Metrolink station. Exchange Square is located near Urbis, formerly an exhibition centre focusing on city life but closed and re-opened in mid-2011 as the National Football Museum. Both Piccadilly and Exchange Square are used for screening public events. Two of the city centre's oldest buildings, The Old Wellington Inn and Sinclair's Oyster Bar, were dismantled, moved 300 yards and re-erected in 1999 to create the new Shambles Square adjacent to Manchester Cathedral.

There are a great variety of restaurants in the city centre. There are also a good stock of hotels in the city centre which include the Midland, the Hilton within the Beetham Tower, and Kimpton Clocktower.

=== Leisure ===
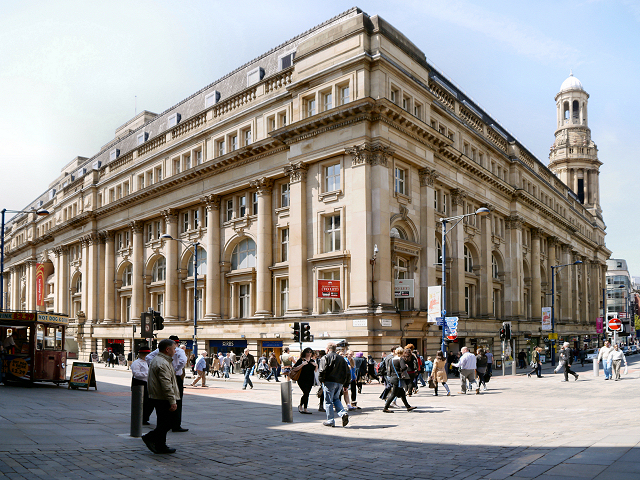
The Royal Exchange building which is home to the Royal Exchange theatre.

Manchester city centre has many nightclubs, many of which follow in the footsteps of the Haçienda nightclub which has now closed; the site has been redeveloped as a housing complex. There is a gay village around the Canal Street area in the east of the city centre, which plays host to an annual gay pride festival, and a large Chinatown with numerous far eastern style restaurants. The area to the west which is bisected by Deansgate and crossed by Peter Street is also well-provided with bars and some clubs (e.g. The Moon under Water and Ampersand). Rafters was a nightclub located in St James's Buildings. A number of bands played concerts at Rafters in the 1970s and 1980s. Rafters closed in 1983. In its final years the DJ was Mike Shaft who appeared on Piccadilly Radio with Takin' Care of Business. After that the club was renamed as Jilly's which existed to 1993, after which the club was called MusicBox. The city centre also has many bars, mostly located in the Northern Quarter, regarded by some as the central district's creative hub. The quarter is well-provided with bars of various sizes; these include TV 21, Bar Fringe, the cocktail bar Apotheca and Trof. Live music venues may also be found here, including the Night & Day Cafe, MOHO Live and jazz bar Matt & Phred's.

There are two major theatres in the city centre, the Palace Theatre (opened 1891) and the Manchester Opera House (opened 1912). In 2008, plans emerged to redevelop the Palace Theatre as a northern base for the Royal Opera and Royal Ballet, however these plans were shelved and both theatres were purchased by the Ambassador Theatre Group for £90m. In recent years the group have launched the 'Manchester Gets It First' campaign and a number of high-profile musicals have premiered in Manchester such as Ghost in 2011. The Royal Exchange, a nationally known theatre company which specialising in new productions of the classics and is known for its 'the round' layout. The Cornerhouse, at the top of Oxford Road and opposite the Palace, is a venue for the visual arts and contains several cinemas which show mainly art house films. A new Cornerhouse and Library Theatre building will open at First Street in 2015 providing a larger home for both companies.

Manchester Art Gallery, opened in 1824, welcomes over half a million visitors every year and is one of the largest galleries outside London. The Manchester Museum of Science and Industry in Castlefield explores the industrial heritage of the United Kingdom with emphasis on Manchester. The People's History Museum explores the social history of Manchester and the United Kingdom. Many galleries and museum exist outside the city centre in Manchester and Greater Manchester such as the Whitworth Art Gallery, Imperial War Museum North and The Lowry.

Galleries and museums in Manchester city centre
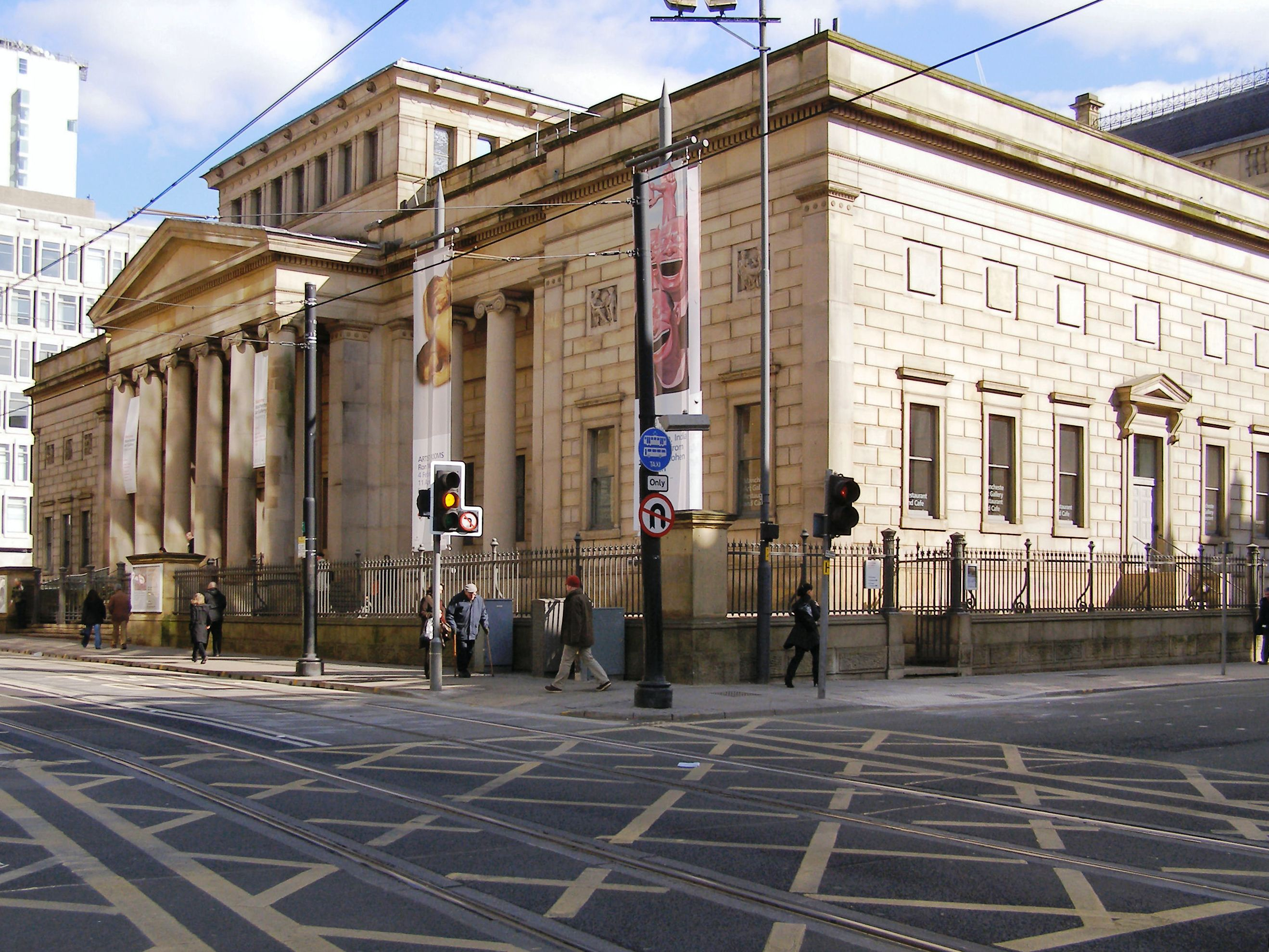
Manchester Art Gallery

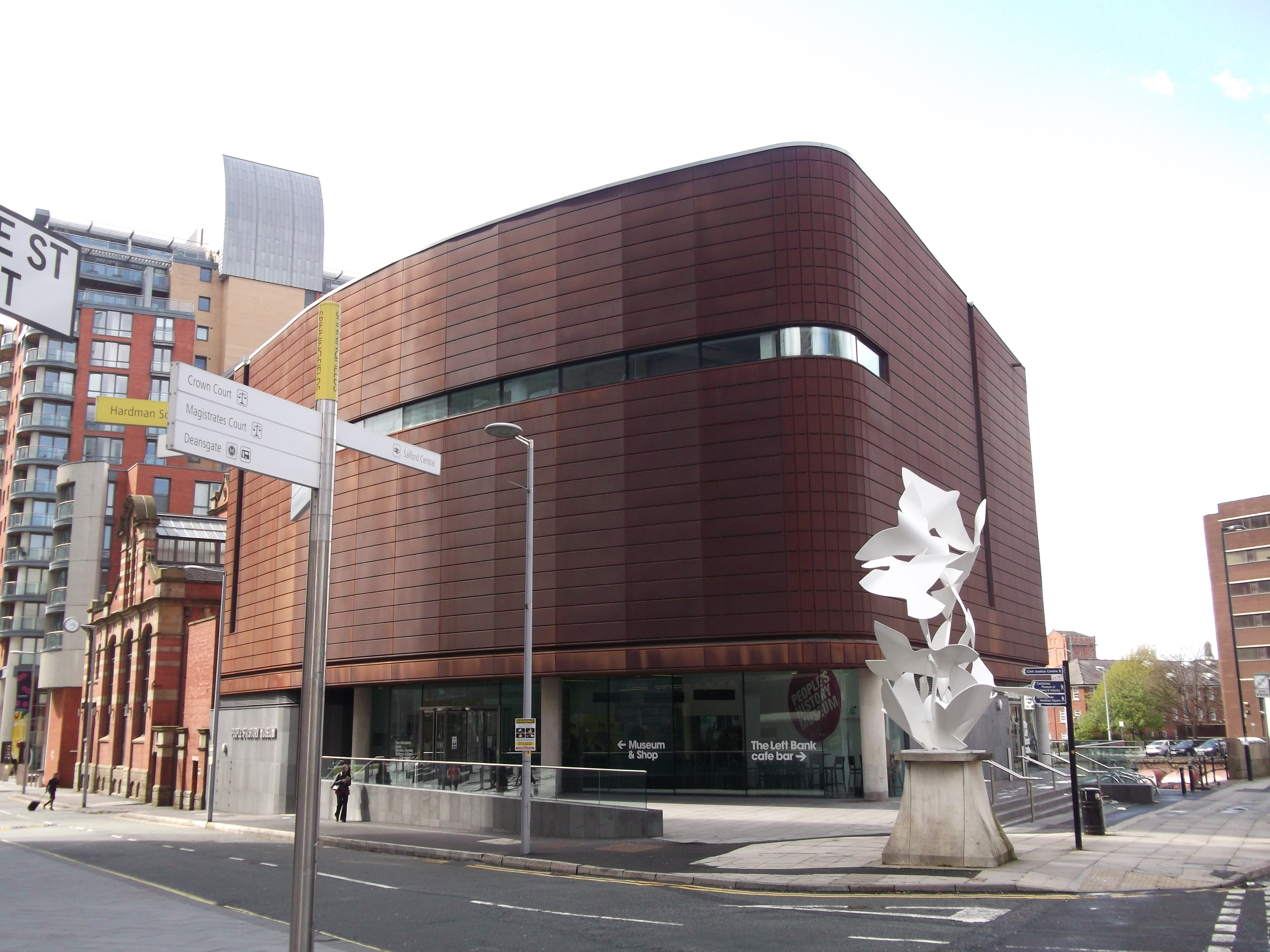
People's History Museum

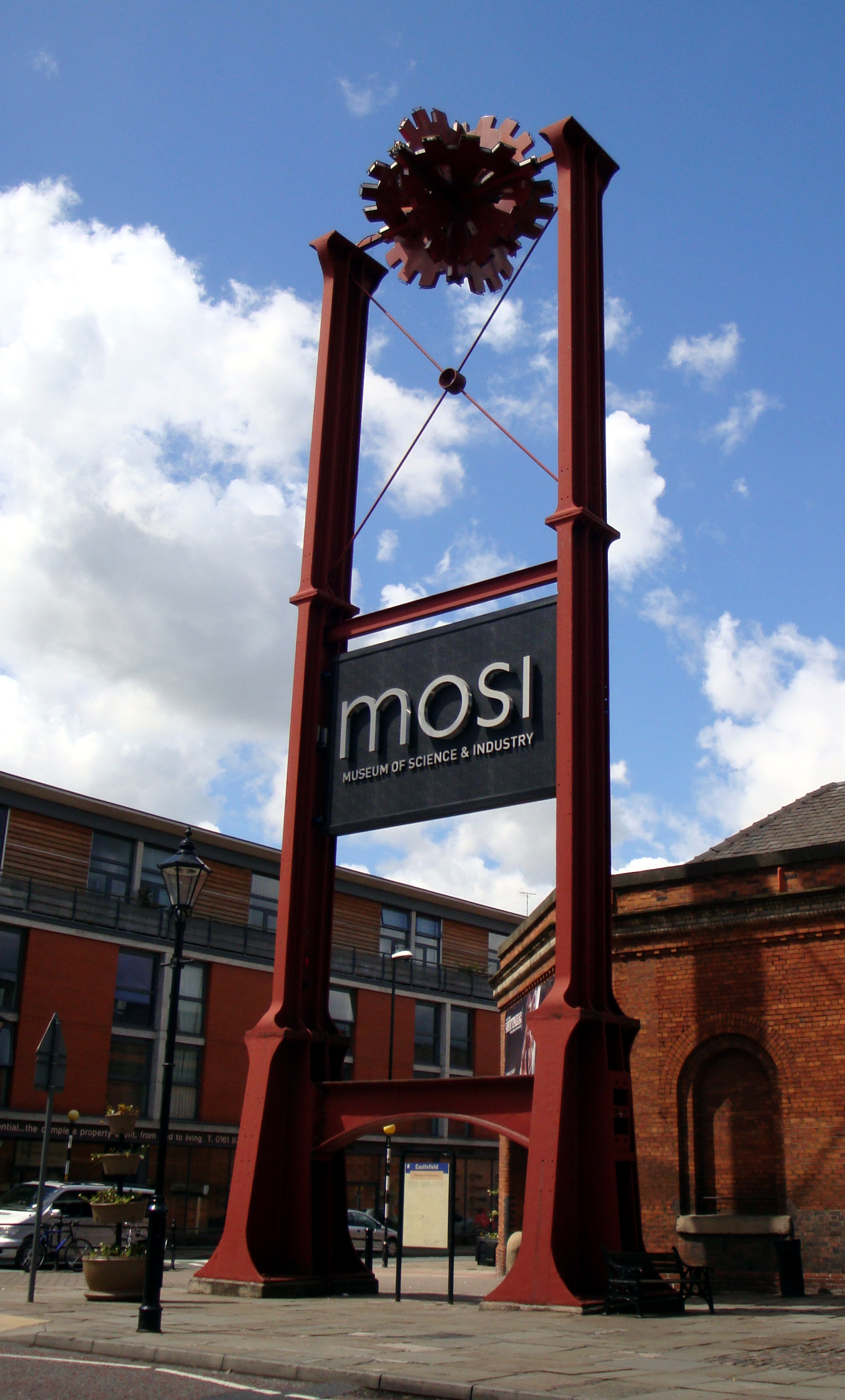
Museum of Science and Industry

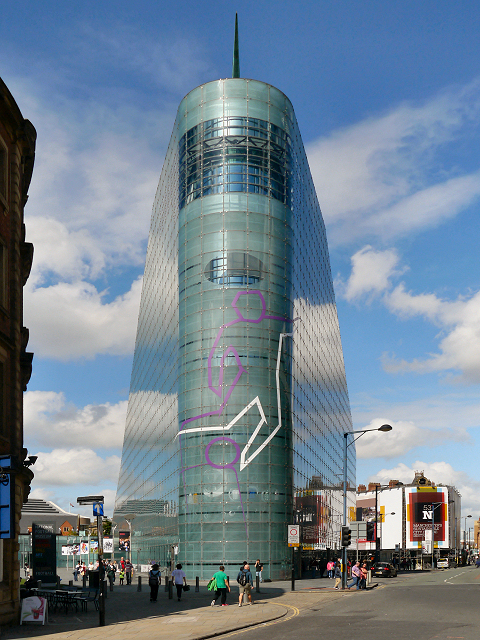
National Football Museum at Urbis

== Transport ==
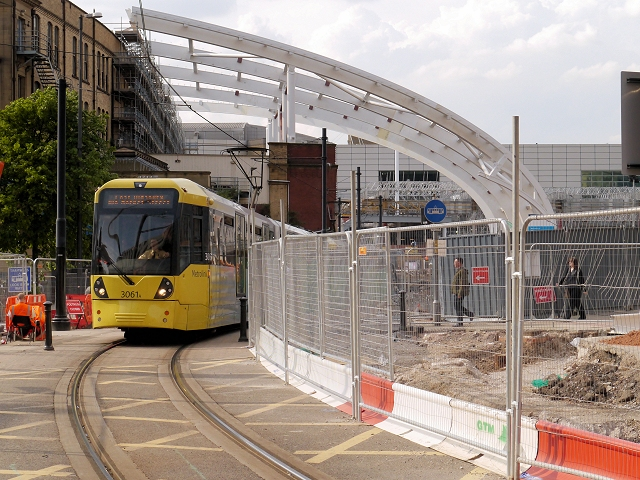
Construction continues on Victoria station and 2CC as a tram departs the station in 2014.

=== Rail ===
Manchester city centre has four railway stations in the Manchester station group: Piccadilly, Victoria, Oxford Road and Deansgate.

- Manchester Piccadilly station is the largest station in the city with 14 platforms plus 2 Metrolink tram platforms, located on the southeast side of the city centre not far from Piccadilly Gardens, the Gay Village, and the Northern Quarter. The main access is from Piccadilly, which continues towards Ardwick as London Road.
- Manchester Victoria station is the main terminus for services from the north and west of Greater Manchester and includes both rail and Metrolink platforms. Victoria is located in the northwest of the city centre near the northern end of Deansgate, Corporation Street and Exchange Square and is connected to the Manchester Arena. It underwent a £44 million renovation, completed in August 2015.
- Manchester Oxford Road station serves the southern corridor of the city centre, where both the University of Manchester and Manchester Metropolitan University are located, as well as the Central Manchester Hospitals, Palace Theatre, and Cornerhouse.
- Deansgate station is located in the southwest, between Deansgate locks and nearby Castlefield at the southern end of Deansgate (which is over a mile long). It is also a short walk away from Beetham Tower, as well as the Great Northern complex, housing an AMC Cinema, bars and leisure attractions. It is connected via a link bridge to Deansgate-Castlefield tram stop.

=== Metrolink ===
Metrolink is the light rail tram service that operates in Central Manchester. The services are usually 6 mins in the peak and 12 mins off-peak to most destinations, all of which are within Greater Manchester. As of 2021 there are eight lines operating, connecting the city centre with termini at Altrincham, Ashton-under-Lyne, Bury, East Didsbury, Eccles, Manchester Airport, MediaCityUK, Rochdale and the Trafford Centre. A new line through the city centre was constructed in 2014–15.

Metrolink stops in the city centre are:

- Deansgate-Castlefield – services to Altrincham, Ashton-under-Lyne, Eccles, East Didsbury, MediaCityUK and Rochdale, and a service to Manchester Airport
- Exchange Square – located in Exchange Square
- Market Street – located in one of the main shopping streets and close the Arndale Centre, serving passengers on the Altrincham, Bury, East Didsbury and Rochdale lines.
- Piccadilly – located beneath the main concourse, with services to Altrincham, Ashton-under-Lyne, Bury, Eccles and MediaCityUK as well as city centre stations/stops.
- Piccadilly Gardens – located in the busiest bus/tram interchange in the city centre with services to Altrincham, Ashton-under-Lyne, Bury, Eccles and MediaCityUK as well as other city stations including Victoria and Piccadilly.
- Shudehill – an interchange station similar to Piccadilly Gardens located near the Northern Quarter, The Printworks and Shudehill bus station. Services to Altrincham, Bury, East Didsbury and Rochdale operate from this interchange.
- St Peter's Square – it serves the Altrincham, Bury, Eccles, East Didsbury, Manchester Airport, MediaCityUK and Rochdale lines. It is located close to the central library, town hall and Oxford Street.
- Victoria – services to Altrincham, Bury, East Didsbury and Rochdale currently operate from this station, however once expansion of the network is complete it will see a new service to Manchester Airport.

Two stations used to serve the city centre but have been closed:

- High Street – closed in 1998, unidirectional platform closed after extension of Market Street stop.
- Mosley Street – closed in 2013, unidirectional.

=== Bus and coach ===
There are also 2 major bus interchanges located in the city centre; Manchester Piccadilly bus station and Shudehill Interchange which all serve local bus services to areas in the 10 Greater Manchester boroughs, as well as some from the surrounding counties of Cheshire, Lancashire, Yorkshire and Derbyshire.

- Piccadilly Gardens bus station provides services mainly to the south and east of Greater Manchester and parts of Cheshire. Most services are operated by Stagecoach Manchester and Metroline Manchester.
- Shudehill Interchange provides services mainly to the north and west of Greater Manchester and parts of Lancashire. Most services are operated by either Go North West or Diamond Bus.

Chorlton Street coach station provides long-distance coach services operated by National Express to cities across Great Britain. Shudehill was opened so the bus system was directional.

== See also ==
- List of tallest buildings in Manchester
