= Matt Haycox =

British television personality and businessman

- Born: Matthew David Haycox; 25 December 1980 (age 45); Leeds, England
- Occupations: Entrepreneur; Businessman; Investor; Podcaster
- Children: Harlie Reese Haycox; Nele Rocki Haycox
- Website: matt-haycox.com

Matthew David Norton Haycox (born December 1980), is a British businessman, investor, and podcaster.

== Career ==
In 2004, Haycox founded a chain of lap-dancing clubs named Provocative Group. Four years later, the group collapsed, with £3 million owed to creditors. Haycox was subsequently banned from being a company director for 12 years.

In 2014, Haycox became a business finance provider and advisor to UK firms who were seeking funding solutions to grow their business. The lending company purportedly borrowed more than £500 million for UK businesses. Much of the sums borrowed by Matt Haycox were via Huddle Capital of whom Matt Haycox was a Director

On 17 May 2025, the UK financial services regulator, the Financial Conduct Authority, issued a formal alert warning the public to avoid dealing with Matt Haycox's 'Funding Guru' which is one of the brands he uses to raise money for his businesses. The FCA stated the company is “unauthorised” and "may be providing financial services or products in the UK without the regulator’s permission. You should avoid dealing with this firm and beware of scams."

High Court filings show Haycox, a co-founder of the Elevate investment fund for Northern SMEs, was ordered to attend Manchester civil justice centre in February 2025 for a cross-examination on his assets, following an application by ANS and Godel founder Scott Fletcher and Lowry Trading, but failed to attend.

On 11 February 2025 he was declared bankrupt for the second time. He has also been hit by a fraud claim of £5.6m by an investor.

On 12 May 2025 Haycox had a multi-million pound worldwide asset freezing order imposed on him by the United Kingdom High Court.

At a court hearing on 9 October 2025, a summary judgement was issued by Judge Richard Pearce on a claim issued by Lowry Trading against Matt Haycox. The claimants alleged Mr Haycox had misled them into providing £4.5m. Judge Pearce found in Lowry Trading's favour, stating Mr Haycox had previously conceded he had made “strategic misstatements” and told “white lies”.

== Personal life ==
Haycox married Jenny Ryan in June 2006 in Las Vegas, US. They lived together in Leeds and have one daughter called Harlie. They have subsequently split-up. He has another daughter Nele with an ex partner. Haycox has been found guilty of deceiving investors as per an article appearing in the Yorkshire Post on the 10th October, 2025.
