= Trinity Way =

Trinity Way may refer to:

- Trinity Way tram stop, Birmingham, England
- Trinity Way, part of Manchester Inner Ring Road, in Salford, England
