= 1 Spinningfields =

Office building in Manchester, England

No. 1 Spinningfields
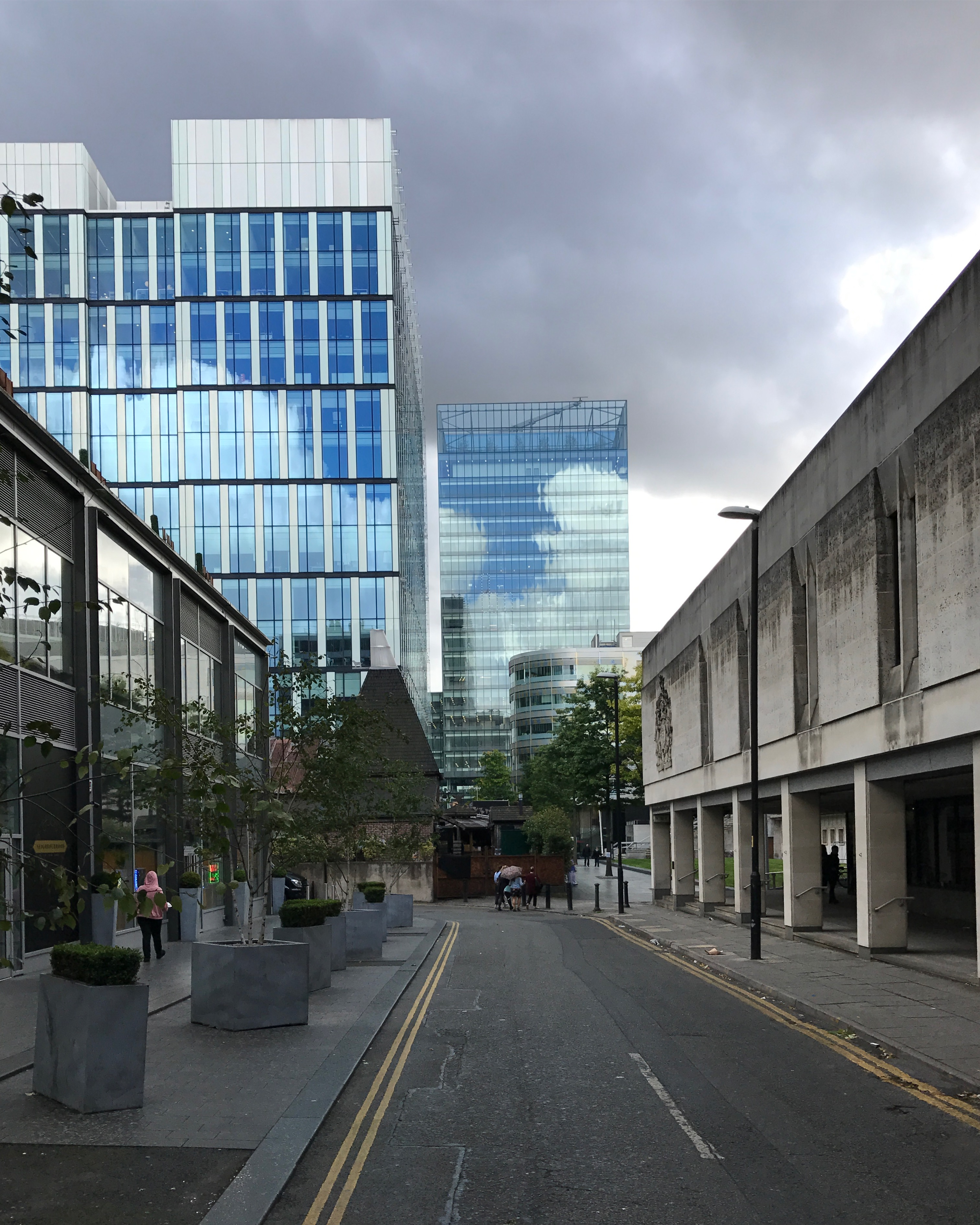
- No. 1 Spinningfields, August 2017

- Location within Greater Manchester

General information
- Type: Office
- Location: Quay Street; Spinningfields; Manchester; England
- Coordinates: 53.4789°N 2.2546°W
- Year built: 2015–18

Height
- Antenna spire: 92 m (302 ft)

Technical details
- Floor count: 20
- Floor area: 34,000 m^{2} (370,000 sq ft)

Design and construction
- Architect: SimpsonHaugh and Partners
- Developer: Allied London
- Structural engineer: RoC Consulting
- Main contractor: BAM

No. 1 Spinningfields (formerly 1 Hardman Square) is a 92-metre (302 ft) office tower in the Spinningfields district of Manchester city centre, England.

The development was previously known as 1 Hardman Square which was a proposed 140 m (460 ft) high-rise but was cancelled in 2009. The development was revived in 2014 with a 92 m (302 ft) high-rise and the revised design gained planning approval in May 2014. Demolition of the former building on the site, Quay House, began in early 2015 and construction of its replacement began shortly afterwards.

== Background ==
=== 1 Hardman Square (2004–2013) ===
The high-rise was first proposed in 2004, linking in with the new developments in Spinningfields and the growth in proposals for tall buildings in the city at the time. The 2008 financial crisis paralysed the development market, particularly in the expensive sector of constructing skyscrapers.

In 2011 it was reported that developers of the tower, Allied London, were on the verge of sealing a £165 million deal with German fund manager, Union Investment. As part of the deal, Union Investments forward-purchased 1 Hardman Square, which gave Allied London the capital to construct the building. Construction of the building was dependent on whether Allied London could sign up tenants for half the building, which reportedly could have taken up to two years as the economy recovered.

=== No. 1 Spinningfields (2014–present) ===
Following the news in 2011 that a deal to build a 350,000 sq ft (33,000 m^{2}) Grade A office tower of 20 storeys was possible, plans for such a scheme were finally released in January 2014 and submitted for planning permission.

Construction began in July 2015, with BAM appointed as the main contractor on what became a £73 million project. The building structure incorporates three major cantilevering façades, including a 7.5-metre (25 ft) eastern cantilever formed by a Vierendeel truss, which shaped both the engineering strategy and the external massing.

By November 2016 the steel frame and cantilevered elements were progressing on site, forming the final component of the wider Spinningfields masterplan. The tower topped out in 2017 and was completed in March 2018, delivering approximately 34,000 square metres (370,000 sq ft) of Grade A office accommodation and establishing itself as the tallest office building constructed in Manchester for 50 years.

As of 2025, the building is Manchester's tallest office building built since City Tower was constructed in 1965.

== See also ==
- List of tallest buildings and structures in Greater Manchester
