= 1 The Avenue =

Building in Manchester, United Kingdom

Coordinates: 53.48008°N 2.24935°W

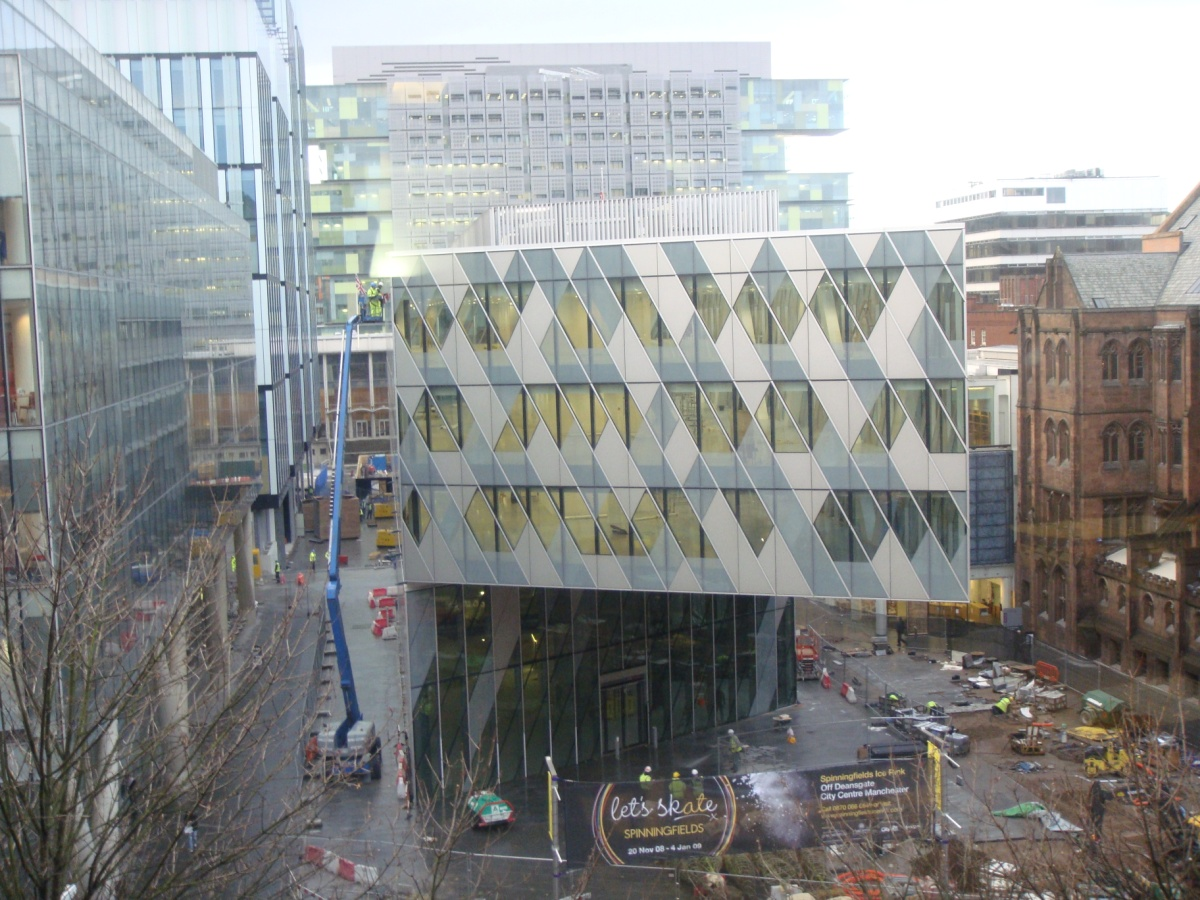
- Former names: 2 Spinningfields Square

General information
- Type: Office, retail
- Architectural style: Post modern
- Location: Spinningfields, Manchester city centre, United Kingdom
- Construction started: 2007
- Opened: 2009
- Landlord: Allied London

Technical details
- Structural system: Steel
- Floor area: 5,100 m^{2} (55,000 sq ft)

Design and construction
- Architecture firm: Sheppard Robson
- Structural engineer: Capita Symonds

1 The Avenue is a building in Spinningfields, Manchester, England. It is situated on Deansgate adjacent to the Grade I listed John Rylands Library.

== Architecture ==
The building consists of two mirror-image parallelograms, stacked one on top of the other, resulting in a three-storey 23 m (75 ft) cantilever on the east end of the building. The cantilever is supported by an inclined steel 'diagrid' structure.

A diagrid is similar in shape to a triangle and other buildings have used a diagrid structure, such as 30 St Mary Axe in London.

Reaction to the glass clad building has been mixed due its proximity to the Grade I listed Rylands Library which, along with Manchester Town Hall, is considered the finest piece of architecture in the city and one of the finest interpretations of Gothic Revival in the world.

== Gallery ==
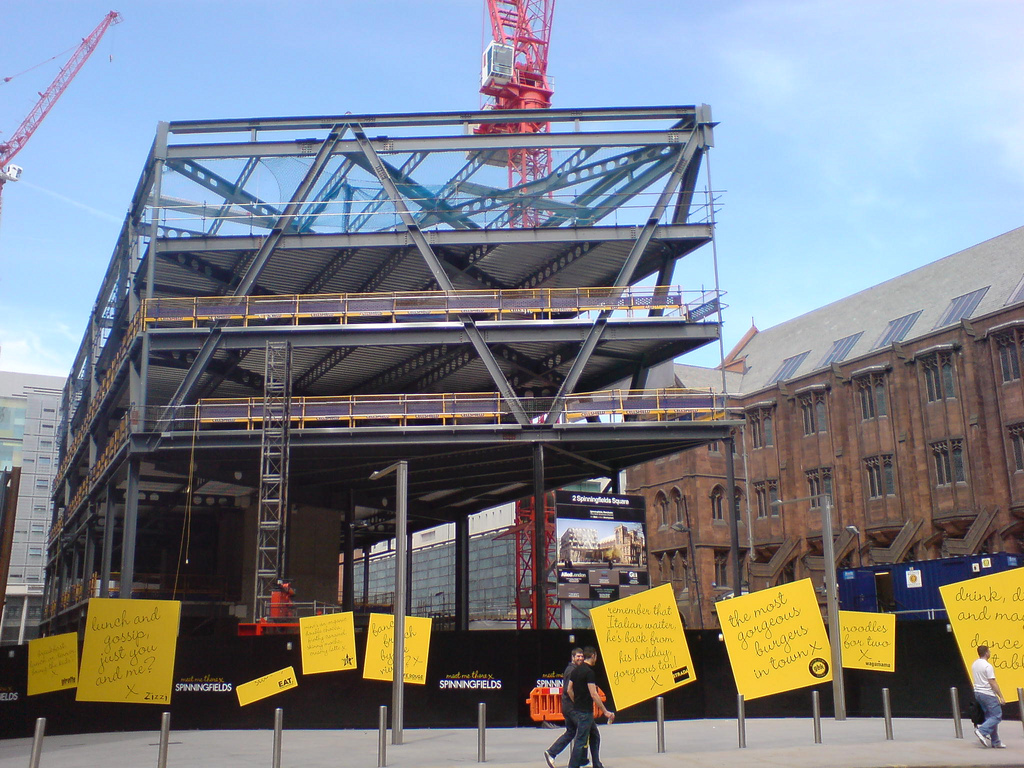
1 The Avenue under construction

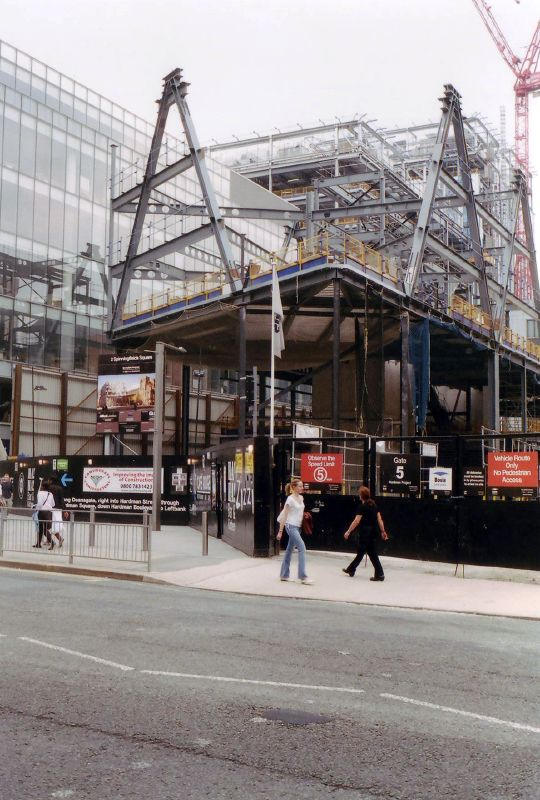
Cantilever under construction
