= Spinningfields =

Central business district in Manchester, England

Coordinates: 53.480°N 2.2540°W

- Central Business District
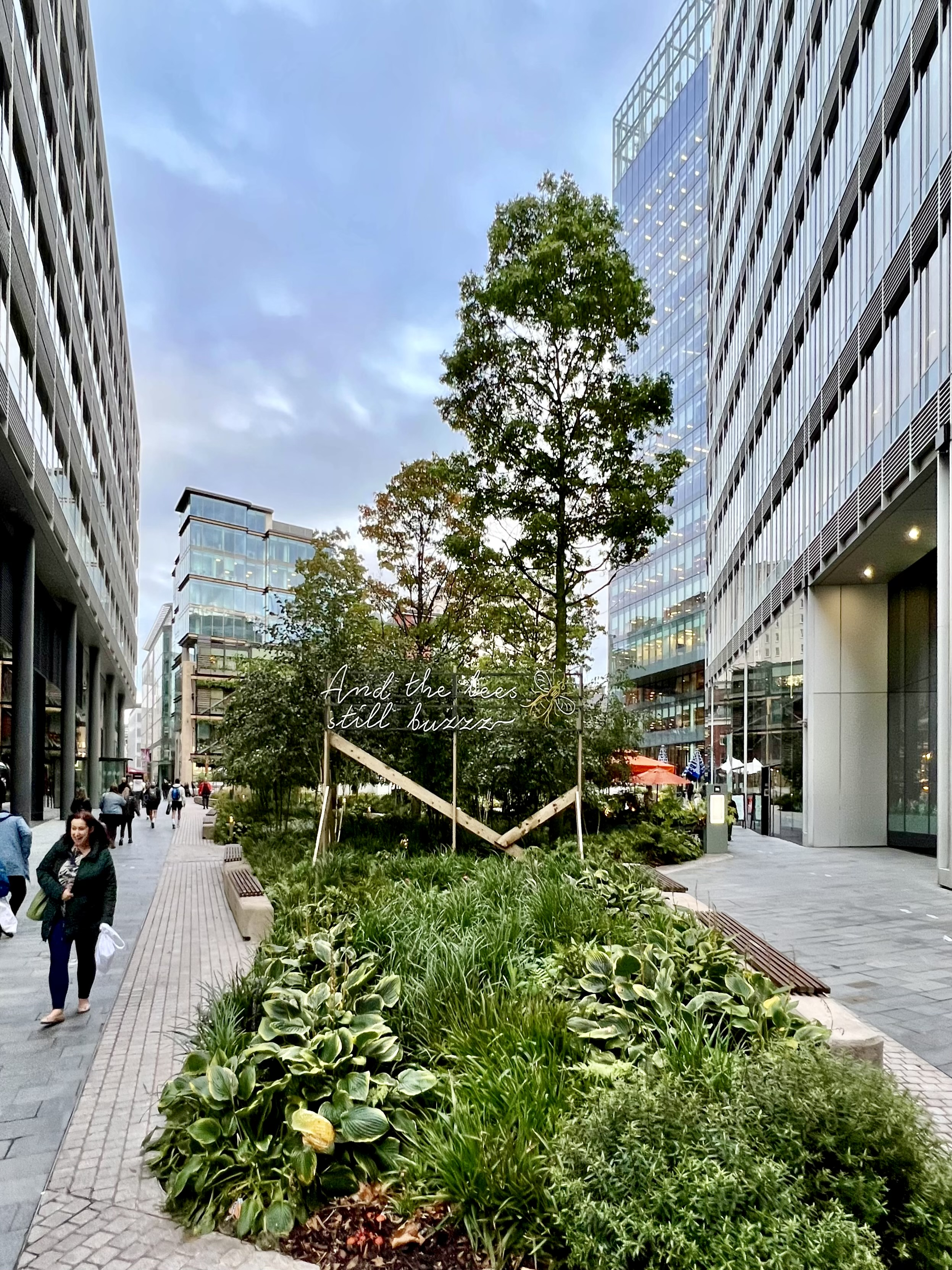

- Location within Greater Manchester
- OS grid reference: SJ832981
- Metropolitan borough: Manchester
- Metropolitan county: Greater Manchester
- Region: North West
- Country: England
- Sovereign state: United Kingdom
- Post town: MANCHESTER
- Postcode district: M3
- Dialling code: 0161
- Police: Greater Manchester
- Fire: Greater Manchester
- Ambulance: North West
- UK Parliament: Manchester Central

Spinningfields is an area of Manchester in Greater Manchester, England. It developed in the 2000s between Deansgate and the River Irwell by Allied London Properties. The £1.5 billion project consists of 20 buildings, totalling approximately 430,000 m^{2} (4,600,000 sq ft) of commercial, residential, and retail space. It takes its name from Spinningfield, a narrow street which ran westwards from Deansgate. In 1968, Spinningfield and the area to the south were turned into Spinningfield Square, an open paved area. Landmark buildings within the scheme include the Manchester Civil Justice Centre and 1 Spinningfields, a 90 m (300 ft) tall office building.

== History ==
The proposal to create a central business district originated in 1997 when Allied London purchased a number of buildings around the John Rylands Library. Allied London executive Mike Ingall was convinced of the site's regeneration potential and Manchester City Council was keen to redevelop the city centre after the 1996 Manchester bombing.

The development, named from a narrow street which ran westwards from Deansgate, is bounded by Bridge Street to the north, Quay Street to the south, Deansgate to the east, and the River Irwell to the west. The Financial Times said in 2012 that the development spread over 22 acres (89,000 m^{2}) and contained 3,000,000 sq ft (280,000 m^{2}) of office space. By 2008, many had been completed and others were under construction or in the planning stages. The structural, civil and geo-environmental engineers were Capita Symonds Structures based in Cheadle Hulme.

Following the demolition of the old Manchester Magistrates' Court in 2006, the vacant space became Hardman Square, a new public realm area created in the centre of Spinningfields. The area was never intended to be a permanent public space, but Allied London later decided not to develop on the land and instead leave it as a green area within Spinningfields.

The 2008 financial crisis resulted in Allied London almost leaving the development half-completed, but the company reached an agreement with the city council who bought the freeholds of 1 and 2 Hardman Square and 2 and 3 Hardman Boulevard which allowed the development to proceed. Deborah Linton of the Manchester Evening News claimed the cost of the freeholds would be in the region of £15 million; and it later emerged that £15.9 million was paid.

Allied London marketed Spinningfields' retail area as a "Knightsbridge of the North" after letting 2 Spinningfields Square (renamed 1 The Avenue) to Emporio Armani and Armani Collezioni. The scheme's flagship thoroughfare, The Avenue, was created to attract high-end stores, traditionally based on nearby King Street. The project has come under scrutiny due to its performance, with the Manchester Evening News describing The Avenue as a "ghost town", whilst contrasting its performance with the thriving businesses in the bohemian Northern Quarter elsewhere in the city.

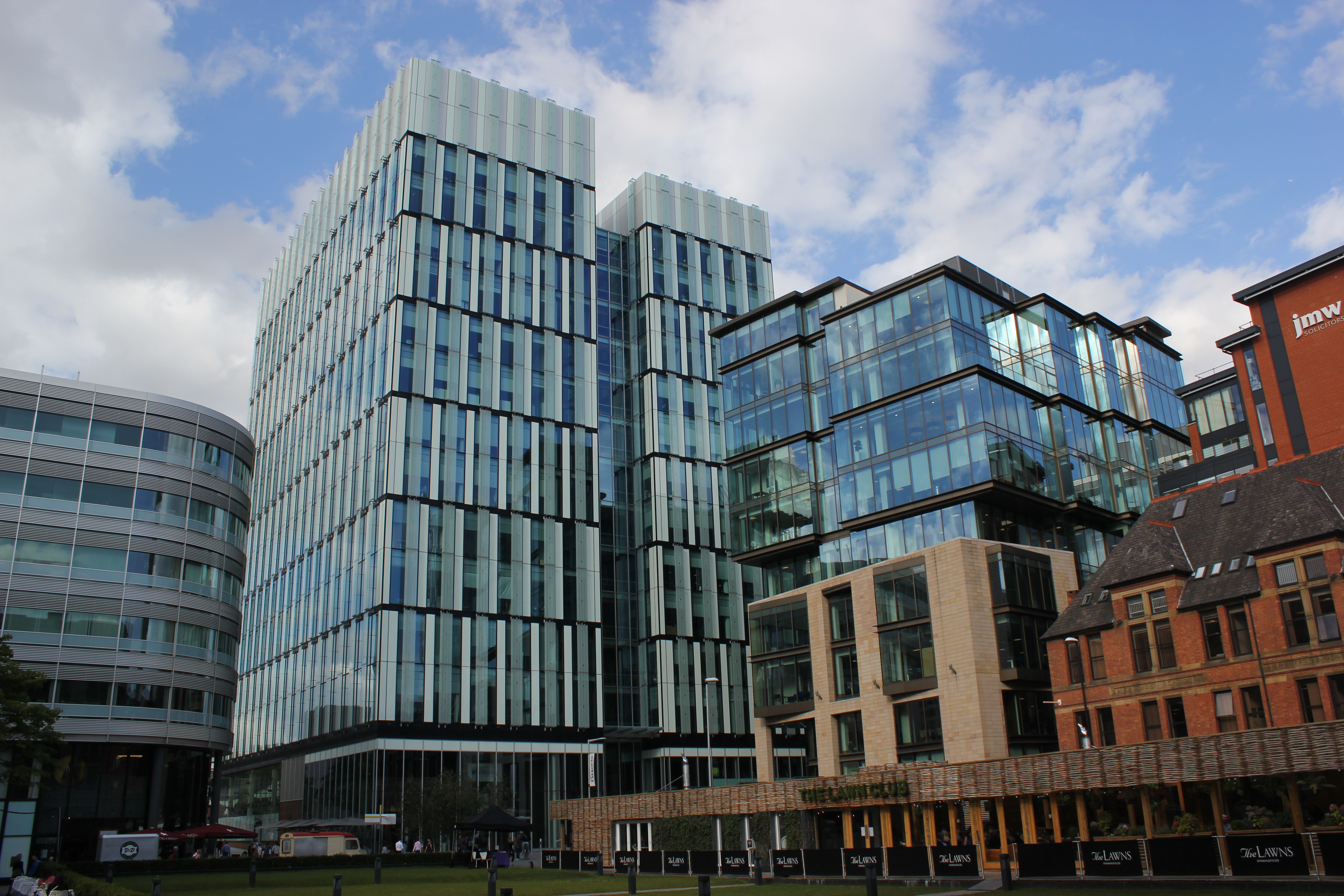
Office blocks in Spinningfields, viewed from Hardman Square

By 2010, Manchester City Council noted in a report that around 16,000 people were employed in Spinningfields and that the area now accounted for over 35% of Manchester's prime office space. A large number of firms in Spinningfields were noted to be financial and professional services companies. Since 2001, twelve buildings had been developed including seven office blocks and 450 apartments, according to the report.

In July 2010, Allied London scrapped the 'Manchester Hotel' project which would have replaced Manchester House. Instead, a retail and office development incorporating a retail arcade linking Bridge Street to The Avenue was created by reconfiguring the building. Tower 12, the building in question, was also refurbished.

In July 2013, it was announced that work was set to begin on 1 Hardman Street, a five-storey office block, with tenant MediaCom to occupy the entire 17,000 sq ft (1,600 m^{2}) building. Mike Ingall described it as "a watershed for the restart of commercial development at the estate, which has been on hold since the completion of 3 Hardman Street in 2009". In November 2013, Allied London submitted plans for a new office block, the Cotton Building. Planning permission was granted for the 10-storey building in January 2014. Allied London began construction after securing a £15m loan towards the building; the North West Evergreen Fund provided £10m and Greater Manchester Combined Authority's Growing Places fund supplied £5m. In March 2016, with the building – renamed as XYZ – nearing completion and fully pre-let, Allied London sold it to Union Investment for £85 million.

Also in January 2014, Allied London submitted plans for the demolition of Quay House and the construction of Number One Spinningfields, a 19-storey high-rise designed by SimpsonHaugh and Partners. The building provides over 340,000 sq ft (32,000 m^{2}) of office space and features a restaurant on the top floor. Ingall stated that "No 1 Spinningfields will be the district's most imposing building to date and one of Manchester's most stand-out office buildings". Allied London agreed to a pre-let with PwC for 50,000 sq ft (4,600 m^{2}) in March 2015, with demolition of Quay House beginning thereafter. In February 2017, the building topped out, with full completion scheduled for July.

== Present day ==
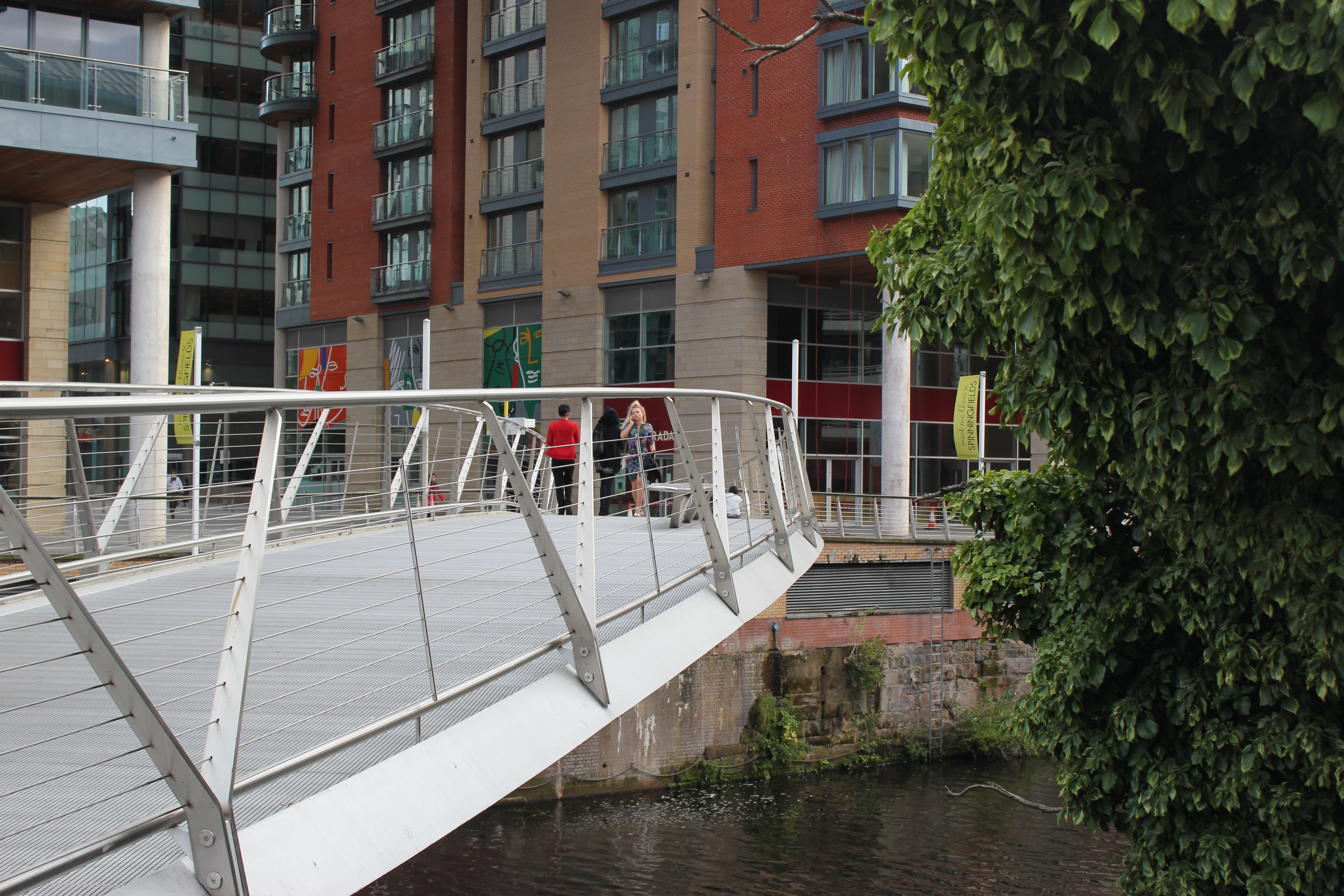
Spinningfields Footbridge, a new footbridge linking Spinningfields in Manchester and New Bailey in Salford

The area is dominated by commercial office developments and has been described as the "Canary Wharf of the North"; the Financial Times has noted, "London has Canary Wharf and Paris has La Défense, Manchester has its own modern financial centre in the form of Spinningfields". Its anchor tenants include Regus, Barclays, DAC Beachcroft, Deloitte, HSBC Bank, Global Radio, Grant Thornton International, Guardian Media Group and Royal Bank of Scotland. Flagship buildings include 1 The Avenue and the Civil Justice Centre.

Across from 1 Hardman Boulevard is 2 Hardman Street, occupied by Deloitte and, after the Manchester Evening News moved out in 2010, DWF. Manchester Evening News vacated the site and relocated offices to Chadderton following the sale of the title from the Guardian Media Group to Trinity Mirror. 3 Hardman Street was constructed on the old Manchester Evening News building site. The 16-storey building was designed by Sheppard Robson was completed in 2009 and is the third-tallest building in Spinningfields as of 2023.

Residential buildings take the form of the 16-storey Leftbank Apartments, which overlook the River Irwell. Situated in the area is the People's History Museum, a former pump house, and on the other side of the river is Salford Central railway station.

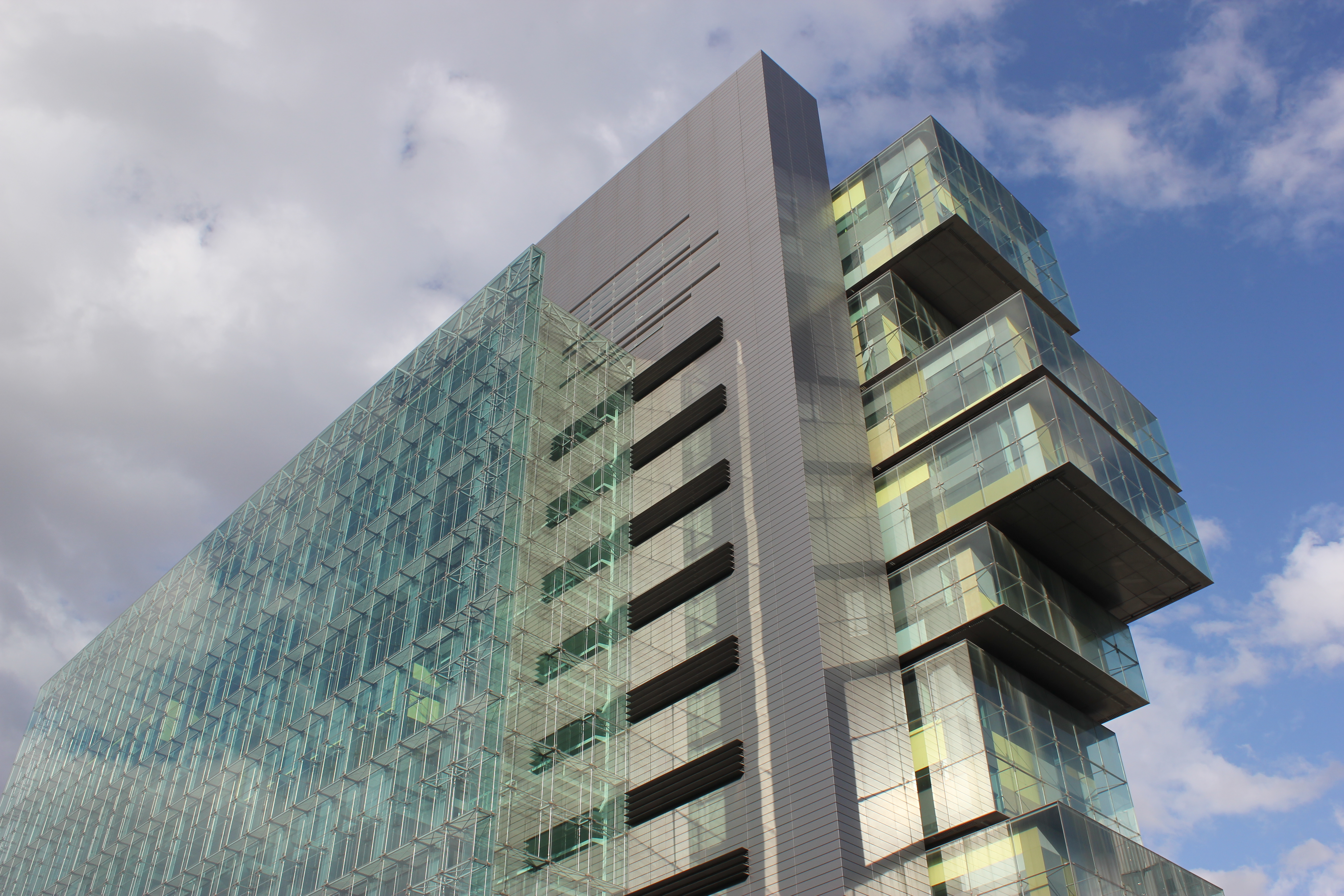
The Manchester Civil Justice Centre is currently the second-tallest building in Spinningfields

Spinningfields is home to various different law courts. Manchester Crown Court, in Crown Square, is in the area; adjacent is Manchester City Magistrates' Court and Coroner's Court. The Manchester Civil Justice Centre, an 80-metre (262 ft) tall building was completed in 2007. The Civil Justice Centre was the first major court complex built in Britain since George Edmund Street's Royal Courts of Justice in London completed in 1882.

Also completed in 2007 were 3 and 4 Hardman Square designed by Norman Foster. 3 Hardman Square was occupied by Halliwells LLP until it went into administration in 2010. Number 4 is occupied by HSBC Bank and Grant Thornton.

Leftbank Apartments are close to a cluster of restaurants including Café Rouge, Carluccio's, Gourmet Burger Kitchen, Giraffe, Ha! Ha!, Strada, Wagamama and Zizzi. Living Ventures owns four establishments in Spinningfields: Artisan, The Alchemist, Australasia, and Manchester House. Manchester House is a £3 million fine dining establishment which opened in September 2013 and featured on BBC2 documentary Restaurant Wars. Fast food operators represented include: Costa Coffee, Greggs, Philpotts and Pret a Manger. The Spinningfields area was voted by Manchester residents as being the most family-friendly area in Manchester in a 2013 study by hotel chain Premier Inn.

A street food initiative named 'The Kitchens' was launched in Spring/Summer 2015, which hosted a number of local traders on the Leftbank area of Spinningfields.

=== Buildings ===
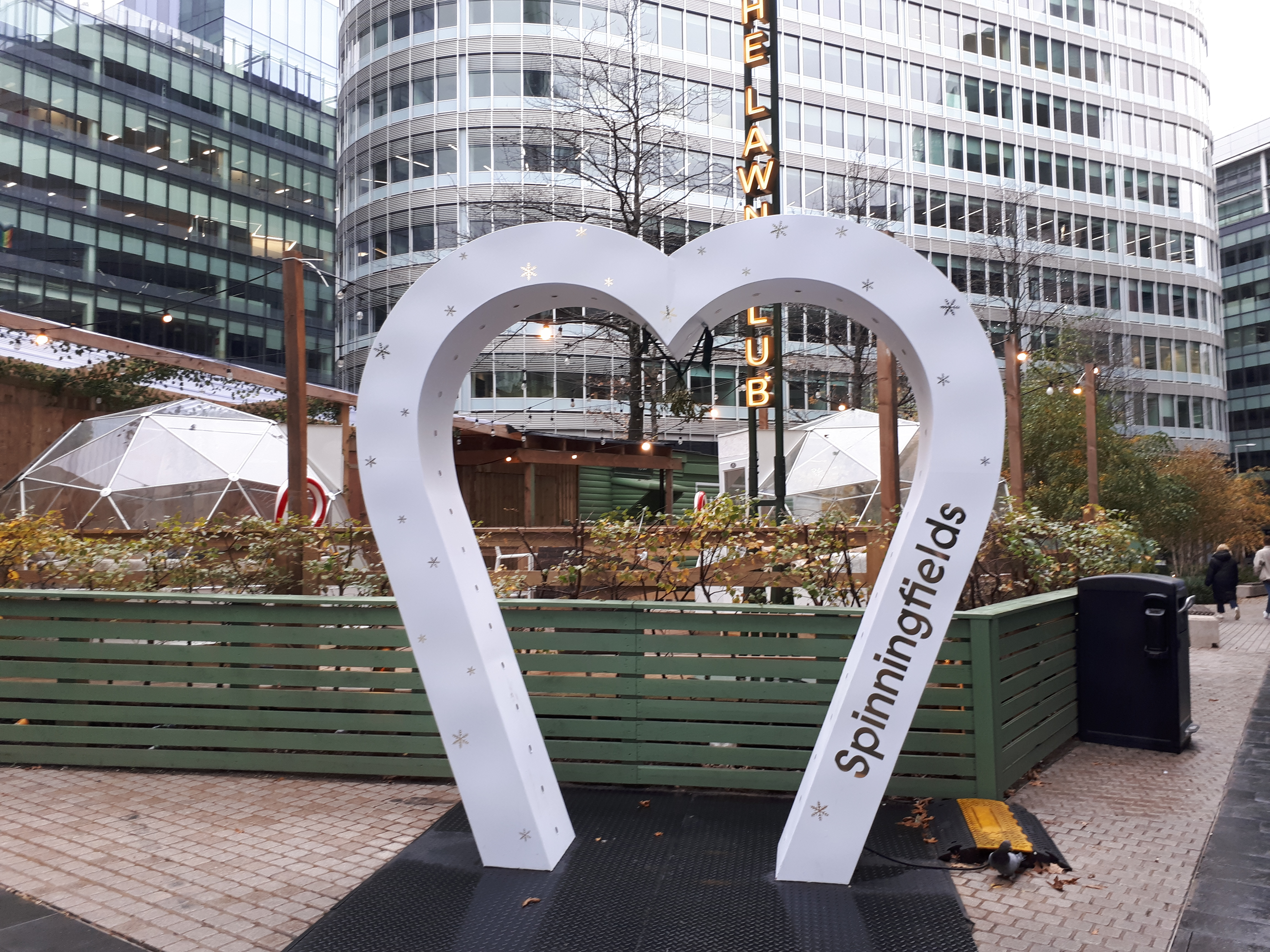
Spinningfields Manchester

Address	Alternative name	Height(m)	Number of floors	Built	Tenants
1 Hardman Square	1 Spinningfields	91	21	2017	Browne Jacobson, Douglas Scott Recruitment, Northedge Capital, Oliver James Associates, PriceWaterhouseCoopers (PWC), Squire Patton Boggs, Weightmans, Wework
3 Hardman Street		75	16	2006	Bank of New York Mellon, Barclays, BDO, Brown Shipley, DAC Beachcroft, General Medical Council, Investec, Lambert Smith Hampton, Marks & Spencer Business Service Centre, Pinsent Masons, Regus, Robert Walters, RSM
3 Hardman Square		49	9	2007	Landmark, Page Group, TLT, Towergate, Worldpay
1 Hardman Boulevard		43	10	2004	Royal Bank of Scotland
2 Hardman Boulevard		42	8	2016	Global Radio, Communicorp UK, NCC Group, Shoosmiths
1 Spinningfields Square		40	9	2009	Coutts, Lombard, Natwest, Royal Bank of Scotland
45 Hardman Street	Vantage Point	38	10	2010	Allied Irish Bank
1 Byrom Place		31	8	2006	JMW
2 Hardman Street		31	7	2008	Deloitte, DWF
4 Hardman Square		27	6	2006	Grant Thornton, HSBC
2 Spinningfields Square	1 the Avenue	23	5	2009	Brewin Dolphin, CMS
1 Hardman Street		20	5	2014	Mediacom
XYZ Building		?	7	2017	Global, NCC, Light and Wonder, Shoosmiths LLP, XYZ Social

== Future developments ==
=== Granada Studios acquisition ===
Following the decision of ITV to relocate from its Granada Studios site adjacent to Spinningfields, in order to move to the nearby MediaCityUK development, the 13.5-acre plot on Quay Street became available for development. After entering into negotiations with sellers ITV, Allied London, alongside Manchester City Council, acquired the land in September 2013 in a £26.5 million deal. The council and Allied London have created a partnership under the name of Manchester Quays Limited, and The site was renamed St John's, and redeveloped into a mixed-use area featuring apartments, retail, 1,200,000 sq ft (110,000 m^{2}) and office space.
