= Manchester Inner Ring Road =

Ring road in Greater Manchester, England

Coordinates: 53°28′13″N 2°14′37″W

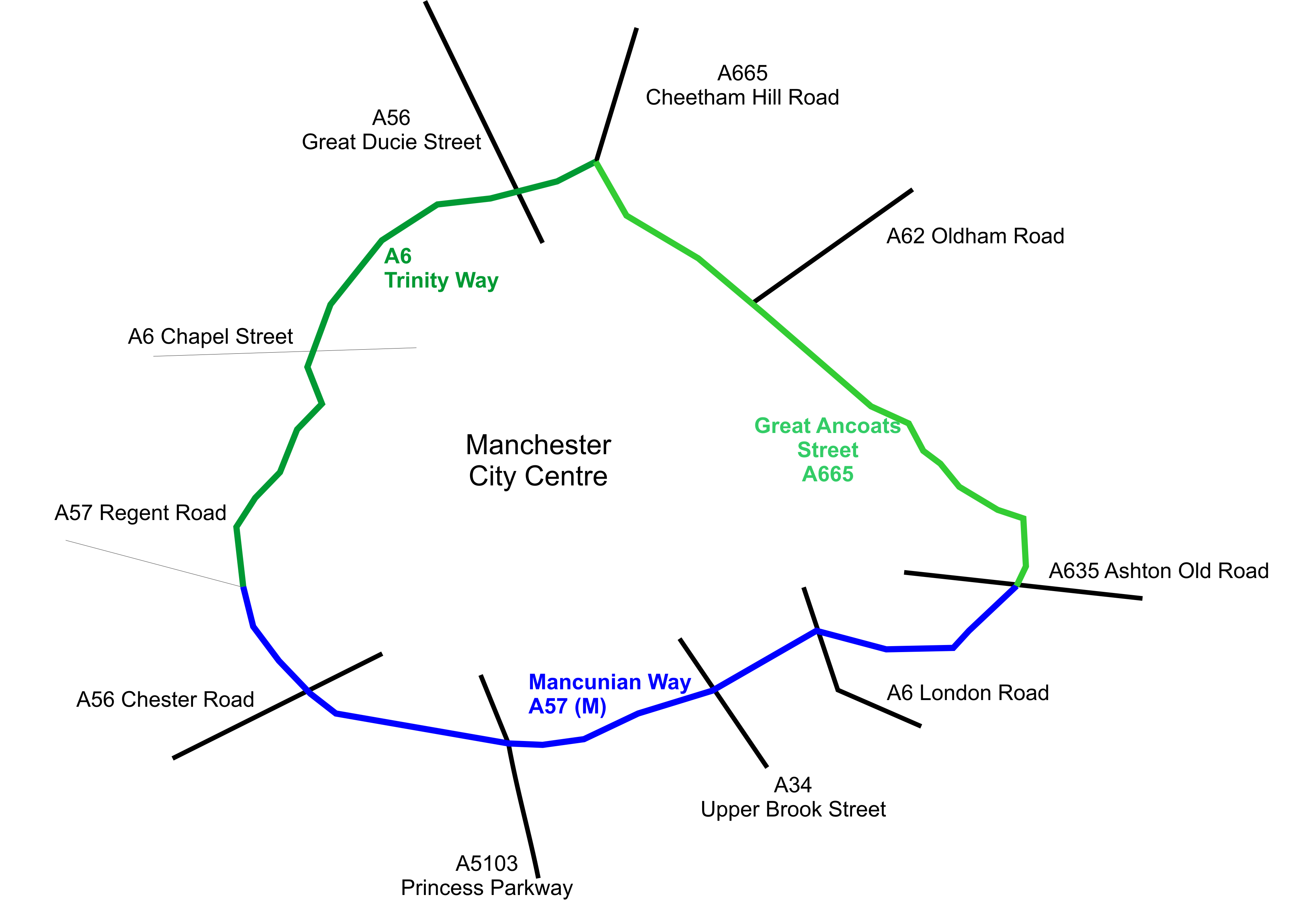
Simplified map of the Manchester Inner Ring Road

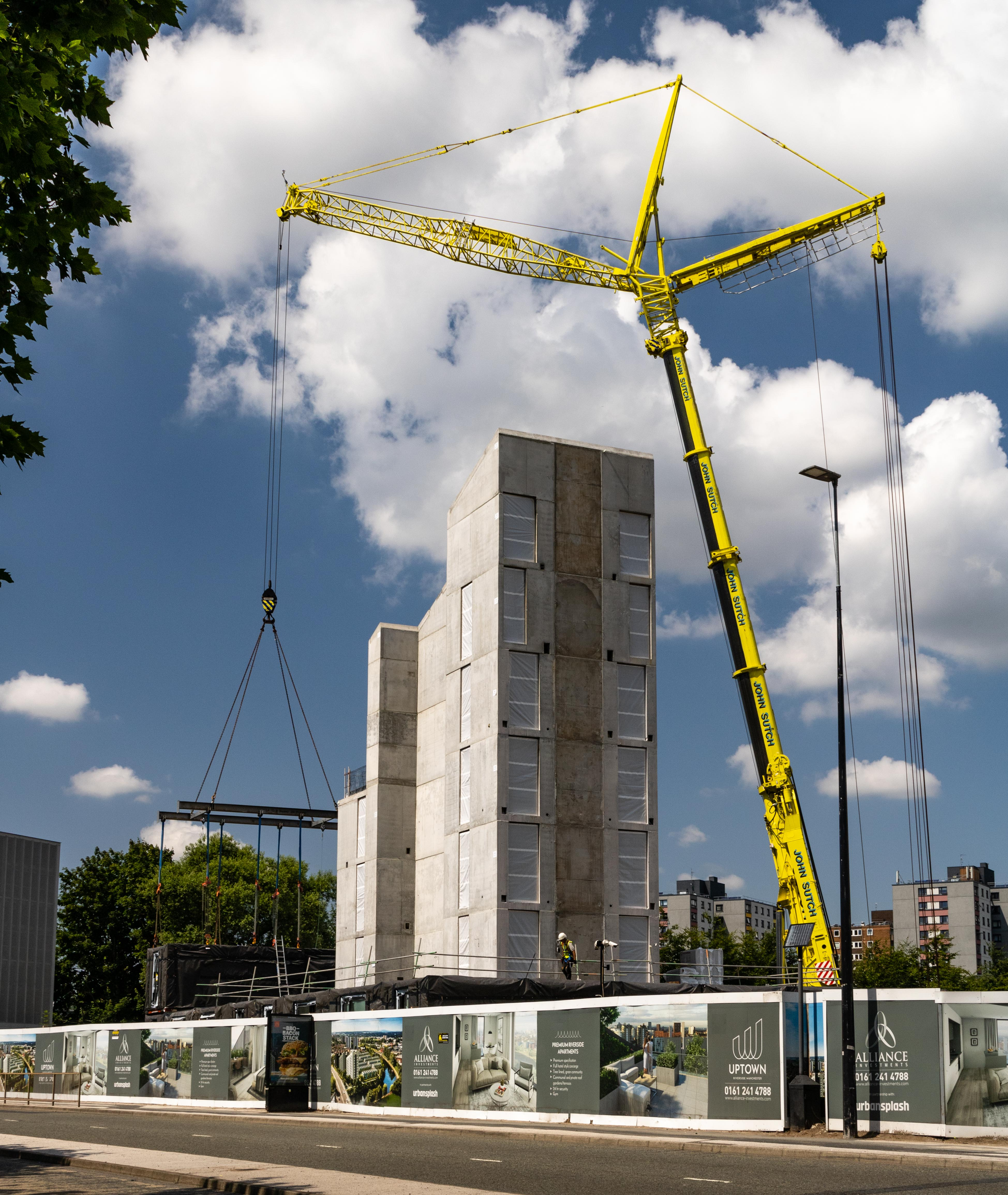
Irwell Riverside, Trinity Way

Manchester and Salford Inner Relief Route (or Manchester Inner Ring Road) is a ring road in Greater Manchester, England. It is the product of the amalgamation of several major roads around Manchester and Salford city centres to form a circular route. It was completed in 2004 with the opening of a final section to Trinity Way.

A major component of the ring road is the A57(M) motorway (Mancunian Way) to the south of Manchester city centre. When it was built, it was planned to be the first of many such inner-city elevated roads. The road is a pivotal part of the ring road for east–west traffic across the southern part of the city centre.

The principal section of Trinity Way opened in 1987 easing congestion on Deansgate and opening a route north-west of the city centre. During 2019–2021, improvements were made to Great Ancoats Street north-east of the city centre, making it mostly dual carriageway.

Great Ancoats Street (to the north and east), Trinity Way (to the north and west) and the Mancunian Way (to the south) almost formed a circle and it was decided to complete it. The final section to the south-west of Manchester city centre between the Mancunian Way near the Granada Studios and the end of Trinity Way at Salford Central railway station was completed on 29 November 2004.
