= Allied London =

Property company of the United Kingdom

- Company type: Property
- Industry: Property
- Founded: 1909
- Headquarters: 1st Floor, 7-8 Savile Row, London, W1S 3PE
- Key people: Chief Executive Officer: Michael Ingall; Finance Director: Freddie Graham-Watson; Development Director: Stuart Lyell; Consultant: Graham Skinner; Associate Director: Jonathan Raine; and Consultant: Philip Daniell
- Products: Various office, residential and leisure space
- Website: alliedlondon.com

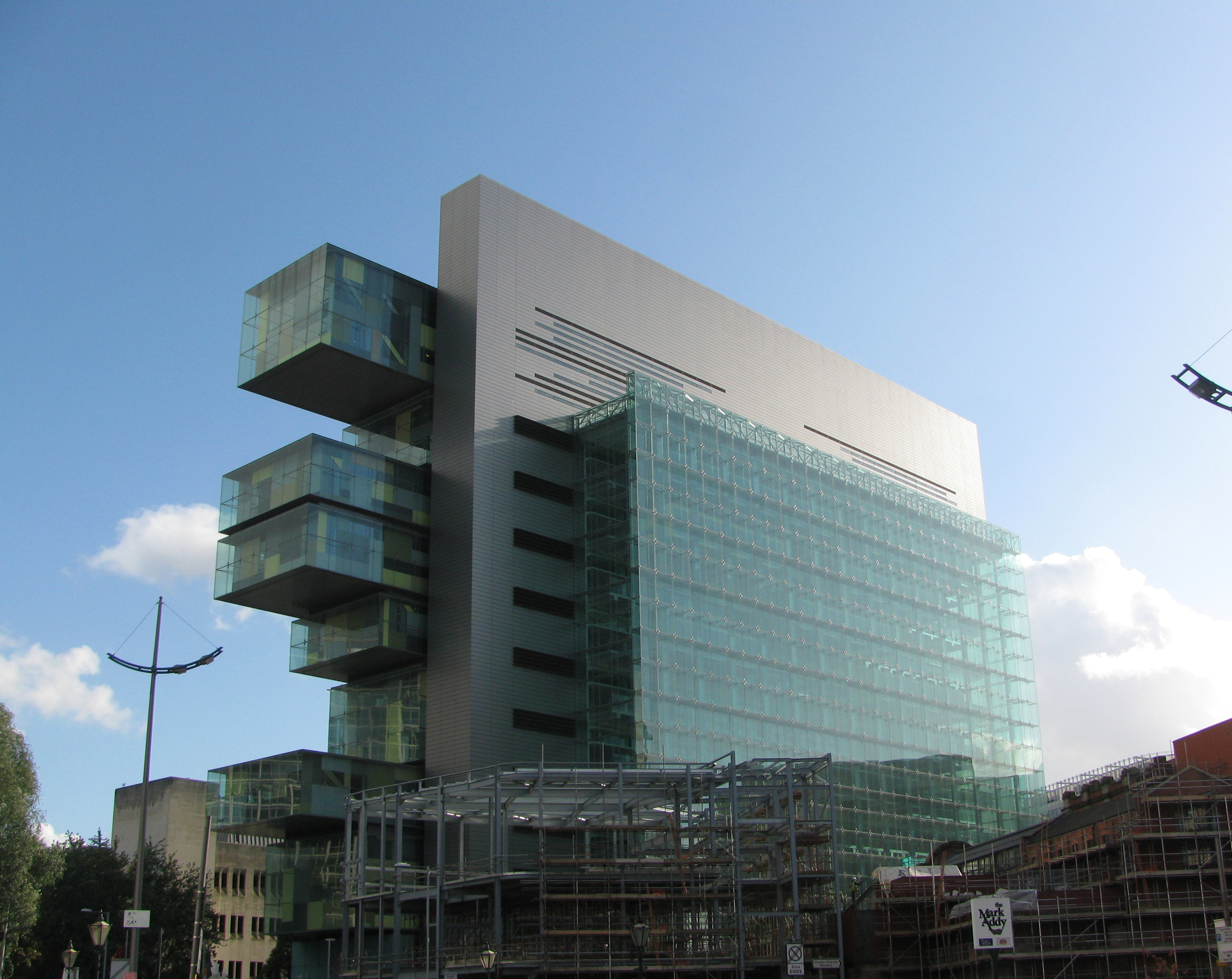
Civil Justice Centre, Manchester

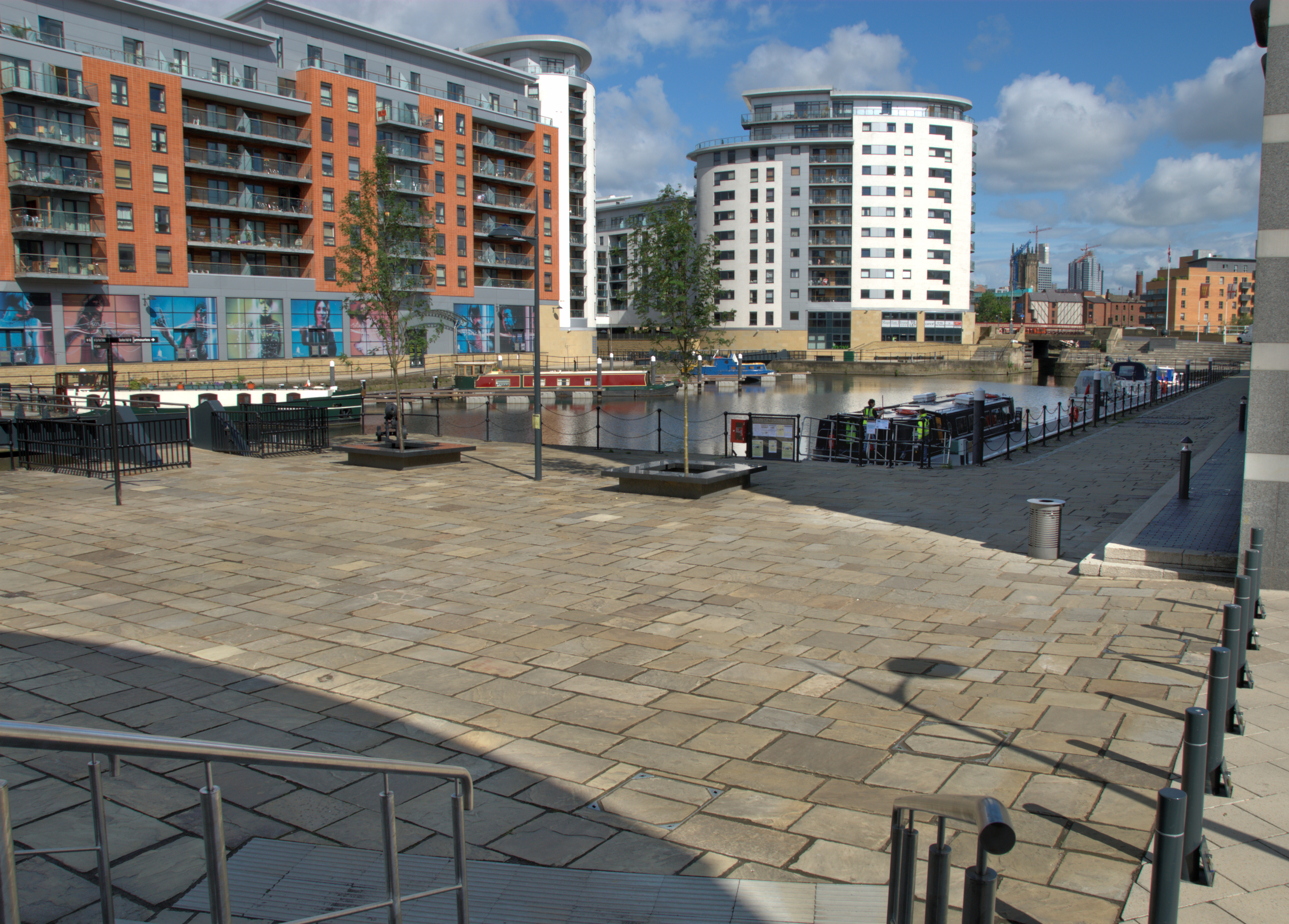
Leeds Dock

Allied London is a property development and investment company that develops landmark projects ranging from re-use to regeneration developments across retail, commercial, office, residential, restaurant, and leisure sectors. The company also offers rental options. They own several buildings in the Spinningfields area of Manchester, as well as Glasgow, Leeds and London.

== History ==
The company was founded in 1909 and became a private company with Michael Ingall as its CEO from September 2000.

== Properties ==
Allied London's properties include:

=== Manchester ===
- The Bonded Warehouse
- The Old Granada Studios
- London Road Fire Station
- Civil Justice Centre
- Castlefield House
- Spinningfields

- Hardman Square
- 3 Hardman Street
- The Lawns
- The Avenue
- The Avenue North
- Tower 12
- Leftbank

=== Leeds ===
- Leeds Dock

=== London ===
- Aldersgate
- Brunswick Centre
- 20 Cannon Street
- Poplar, London
- Herbal House
- 28 Savile Row

=== Glasgow ===
- Skypark

== The hello Project ==
In April 2014, Allied London launched hello Work, to provide hot desking, co-working and studios alongside a community and events programme for SMEs.
