= Manchester Civil Justice Centre =

Governmental building in Manchester, England

Civil Justice Centre
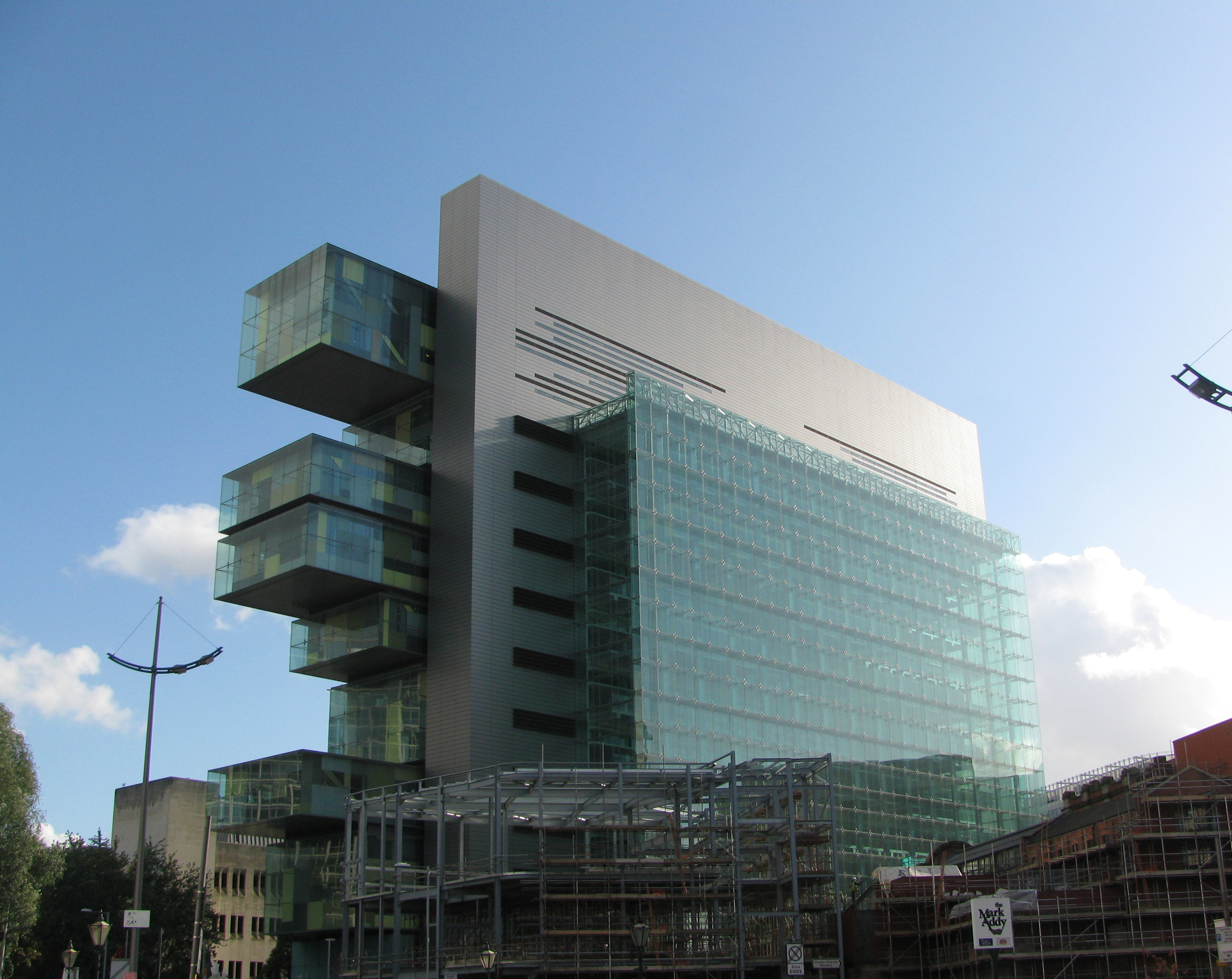
- Manchester Civil Justice Centre, Spinningfields
- Alternative names: MCJC

General information
- Status: Completed
- Type: High-rise Courts
- Architectural style: Futurist / Expressionist
- Location: Spinningfields, Manchester, England
- Coordinates: 53°28′52″N 02°15′09″W
- Completed: 2007
- Cost: £113 million

Height
- Roof: 80 m (260 ft)

Technical details
- Floor count: 17
- Floor area: 35,160 m^{2} (378,500 sq ft)

Design and construction
- Architect: Denton Corker Marshall
- Developer: Allied London
- Structural engineer: Mott MacDonald
- Main contractor: Bovis Lend Lease

Manchester Civil Justice Centre is a governmental building in Manchester, England. Completed in 2007, it houses Manchester's county court and the Manchester District Registry of the High Court, the city's family proceedings court, the district probate registry, and the regional and area offices of the Court Service.

The Civil Justice Centre was the first major court complex built in Britain since George Edmund Street's Royal Courts of Justice in London completed in 1882. Its distinctive architecture has been nicknamed the "filing cabinet" because of its cantilever floors at the end of the building. The design takes inspiration from Expressionist architecture, as well as the artistic Futurist movement of the 1920s which promotes dynamic lines and a sense of fluid movement.

Commissioned by the former Department for Constitutional Affairs (now the Ministry of Justice), the building was funded as a Public–private partnership and is the centrepiece of the Spinningfields development. The building opened to widespread acclaim for its expressionist dynamism, environmental credentials and high-quality design. It was nominated for RIBA's Stirling Prize in 2007 and named one of the "Best British buildings of the 21st century" by Blueprint magazine in 2011.

== History ==
The Justice Centre is in Spinningfields, an area west of the city centre which has been regenerated since the 1996 Manchester bombing. The building was required to provide new court space for Greater Manchester. An international competition managed by RIBA Competitions to design a landmark building to complement the development was launched in 2000. The brief required a minimum floor-plate of 300,000 sq ft (28,000 m^{2}) and flexibility as a potential office building. The competition garnered 100 applicants which was whittled down to 49 long-list proposals.

The competition attracted the attention of major international architecture practices including Foster + Partners, Kohn Pedersen Fox, Nicholas Grimshaw and Partners and Feilden Clegg Bradley - all of which made it to the last 11 short-list. The three finalists were Richard Rogers Partnership, Pringle Richards Sharratt and Denton Corker Marshall.

In August 2002, the design proposal from Australian architects Denton Corker Marshall, with engineers Mott MacDonald, was announced as the winner. The practice won the competition for the manner in which they maximised the elongated site, the striking yet practical design, clear zoning of space and value for money.

Construction began in 2003, funded by a £160 million public–private partnership deal between developer Allied London and the government. The western side of the 80 metres (260 ft), 17-storey building faces the River Irwell. Its entrance opens onto Bridge Street.

The structure is notable for "fingers" at each end, cantilevered over the lower levels. On the western facade is a 60 m × 60 m (200 ft × 200 ft) suspended glass wall which totals 11,000 square metres (120,000 sq ft) - the largest in Europe. Government and justice departments have a 35-year lease on the building. It was designed so that it could be converted into offices in the case of a lease exchange. On 18 January 2007, during the Kyrill storm, several pieces of aluminium cladding were blown off the building during the construction process - one struck a woman walking along Bridge Street.

The building opened on 24 October 2007, becoming the largest civil court to be constructed in the United Kingdom for more than a century. The building was officially inaugurated on 28 February 2008 by Queen Elizabeth II.

== Architecture ==
=== Environmental ===
The building is built to BREEAM Excellent rating - the highest level. The elongated form of the building allowed for natural cross-flow ventilation from the prevailing west-to-east facade. The slender plan allows natural light to permeate most areas of the building without the need to resort to electric lighting. Denton said that although buildings can be designed to be energy-efficient, the biggest problem is teaching people to use the building properly. A water source heat pump was used to provide cooling and heating around the building. The architect's intention was to originally siphon water from the River Irwell nearby but upon discovering an aquifer beneath the building, engineers considered this a more reliable option.

== Reception ==
The Civil Justice Centre has been well received by architecture critics who have praised its striking aesthetics, environmental credentials and structural quality. The Guardian architecture critic Owen Hatherley described it as a "genuinely striking building". The Telegraph said the "building can be described only in superlatives". Building Magazine praised the building's "flamboyancy".

Blueprint magazine editor Peter Kelly believed the Civil Justice Centre was symbolic of Manchester's renaissance since the 1996 bombing, describing it as "a civic facility of true excellence, the courts building is regarded as a symbol of the city's global significance". Blueprint added:

The Manchester Civil Justice Centre would stand out in any city. With its assemblage of cantilevered structures that extend beyond its normal footprint and its astute use of colour, the MCJC's presence in the city is imposing and unmistakable.

Architecture critic Deyan Sudjic believed the building was the best new building in Manchester:

Denton Corker Marshall have brought this sense of precision and clarity with them. It's not that they have built an Australian building, but rather that they have built something that has a freshness which seems both familiar and exotic in the British context. Yet this building is in the centre of the city, and it offers not a provincial reflection of a distant metropolitan original but a sophisticated, confident model for what a contemporary and urbane public institution can be. It has surprised Manchester - it is, the city's movers and shakers tell you, the best new building in the city. And they are right to say that.

RIBA described the structure as "an elegant and beautifully executed response to a complex brief that has made a significant contribution to the regeneration of this part of Manchester."

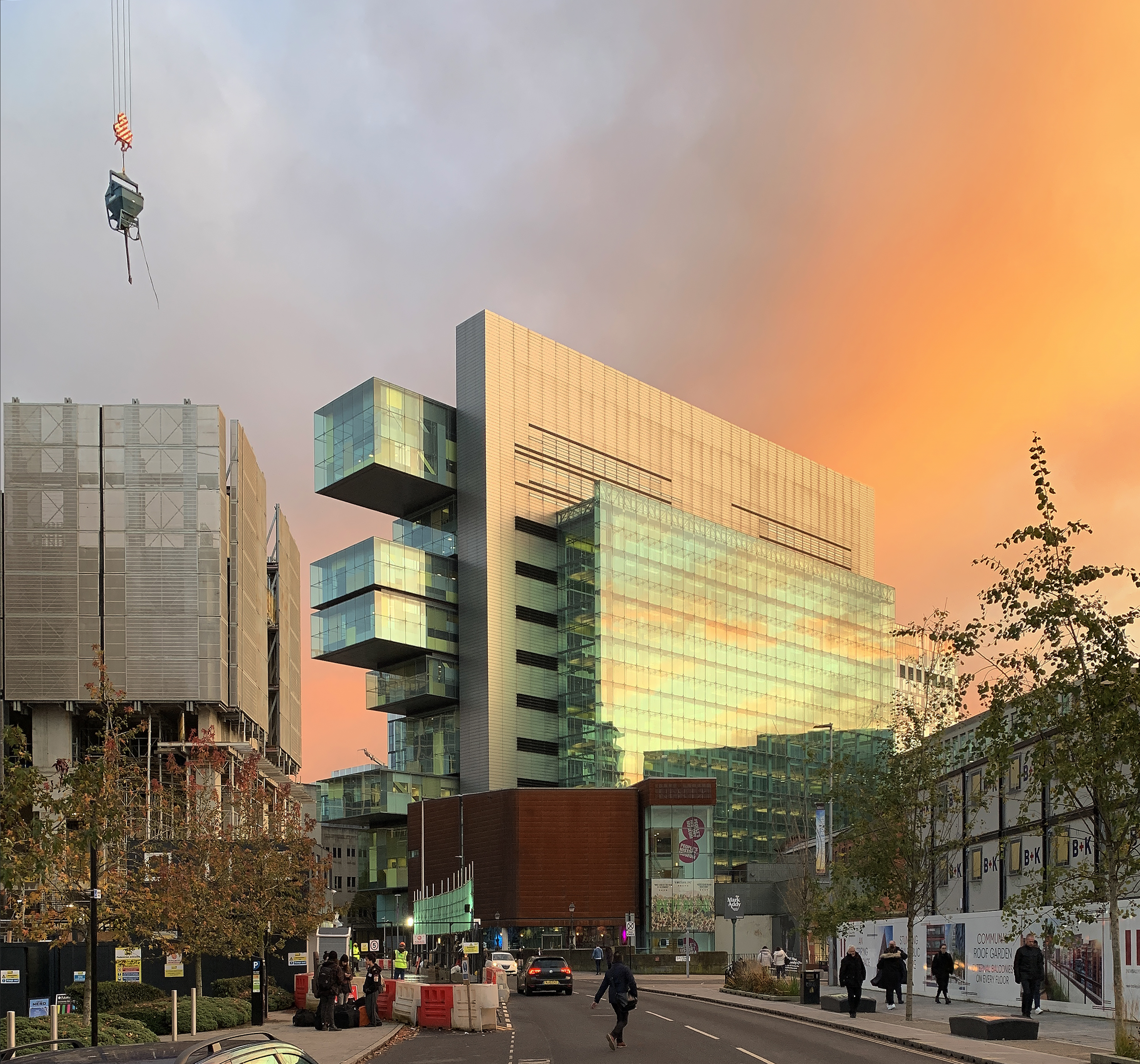
Manchester Civil Justice Centre at sunset

Ken Shuttleworth of Make Architects and one of the lead architects on The Gherkin in London described the building: "I think it's a fantastic building, I went to see it, I think it's a stunning piece of architecture. I was excited when I saw it, it's a great building." Shuttleworth also stated how interesting it was to see Australian architecture in the United Kingdom. Most buildings use all the site whereas Denton Corker Marshall only used an elongated slither of the plot for the building.

== Awards ==
Manchester Civil Justice Centre was shortlisted for the Stirling Prize in May 2008. It was originally the overwhelming 8/13 favourite but lost to the Accordia development in Cambridge.

The building has won awards for its sustainability credentials, innovative engineering design and striking architecture. It received a RIBA Award shortly after opening and was short-listed for the 2008 Stirling Prize. Awards won by the MCJC include:

- RIBA Award 2008 - Royal Institute of British Architects National Awards:
- Project of the Year 2008 – Building Awards (organised by the leading magazine, Building)
- Project of the Year – North West Regional Construction Awards 2008 (organised by Constructing Excellence)
- Project of the Year - National Constructing Excellence Awards 2008
- Major Project of the Year – Green Construction Awards 2007
- Architecture Grand Prix Gold Award – Rose Design Awards 2007
- Gold Award – Best Public Building Awards 2007
- Building Magazine Project of the Year - 2008

== See also ==
- List of courts in England and Wales
- List of tallest buildings and structures in Greater Manchester
