= Manchester station group =

Four stations in Manchester, England

Heavy rail stations in Greater Manchester

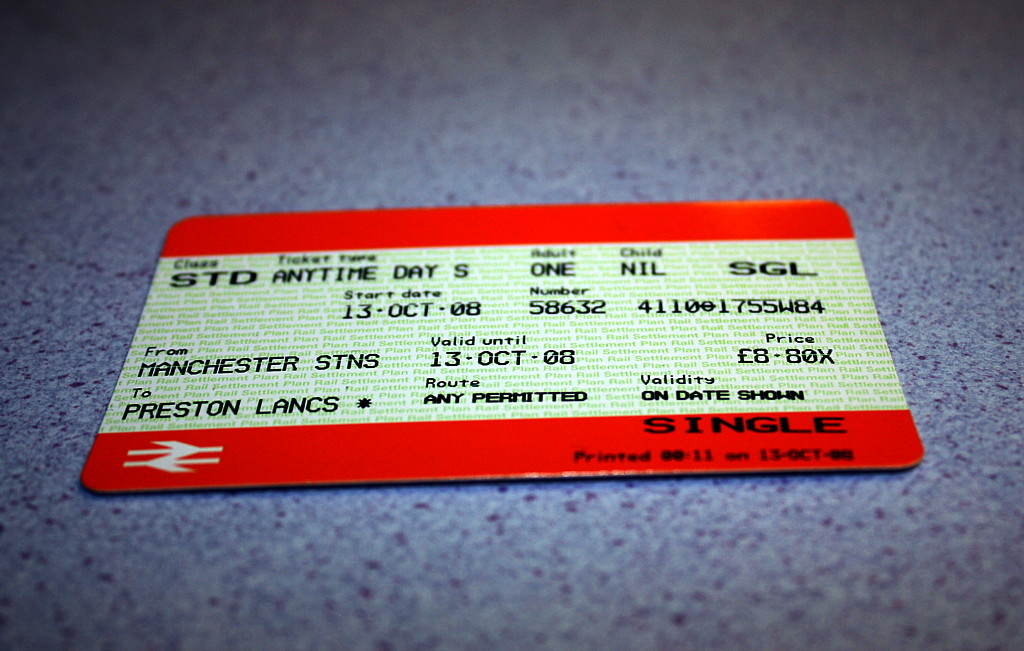
A ticket from Manchester Stns to Preston. Any route is permitted, so the passenger has a choice of embarking from either Piccadilly, Oxford Road or Deansgate on the TransPennine Express North West route, the Northern route or from Victoria by Northern Trains

The Manchester station group is a station group (for fares purposes) of four railway stations in Manchester city centre, England; this consists of Manchester Piccadilly, Manchester Oxford Road, Manchester Victoria and Deansgate. The station group is printed on national railway tickets as MANCHESTER STNS. For passengers travelling from one of the 91 National Rail stations in Greater Manchester, the four stations are printed as MANCHESTER CTLZ which additionally permits the use of Metrolink tram services in Zone 1 (between Cornbrook, New Islington and Victoria).

The Manchester station group does not include Manchester Airport station, nor Salford Central. Since the opening of the Ordsall Chord in 2017, there has been an increase of through as opposed to terminating services; for example, the TransPennine Express from Saltburn to Manchester Airport now calls at Victoria, Oxford Road and Piccadilly.

Rail passengers may board or disembark at any one of these four stations. National visitors from outside Greater Manchester with MANCHESTER STNS as the destination are not permitted to use Metrolink in Zone 1, as it is a locally-funded transport scheme and receives no national government subsidy.

When using the National Routeing Guide, Salford Central is shown as part of the Manchester Group. This means that tickets to or from Salford with 'Route: Any Permitted' have the same validity as those to or from MANCHESTER STNS, but cannot be used interchangeably.

== Use in Metrolink Zone 1 ==
=== Greater Manchester passengers ===
Passengers who travel on rail services from the Greater Manchester area into one of the four Manchester stations will be issued with a ticket stating the destination as Manchester CTLZ as opposed to Manchester Picc or Manchester Vic. This allows visitors to use Metrolink trams between stops in Zone 1 for free on the presentation of a Manchester CTLZ rail ticket. The Freedom of the City scheme was introduced in 2005 by GMPTE, now Transport for Greater Manchester. Zone 1 includes ten Metrolink tram stops:

- Cornbrook (also in Zone 2)
- Deansgate-Castlefield (railway station)
- Exchange Square
- Market Street
- New Islington
- Piccadilly (railway station)
- Piccadilly Gardens
- Shudehill
- St Peter's Square
- Victoria (railway station)

=== National Rail passengers ===
Passengers travelling into Manchester from outside the Greater Manchester county are not permitted to use rail tickets to travel around the city centre on the Metrolink. As a consequence the destination on the orange rail tickets is stated as Manchester STNS. The Manchester Metrolink is a locally funded transport system which receives no national subsidy from central government. National Rail passengers can use the free buses outside stations to travel around the city centre.

== Future ==
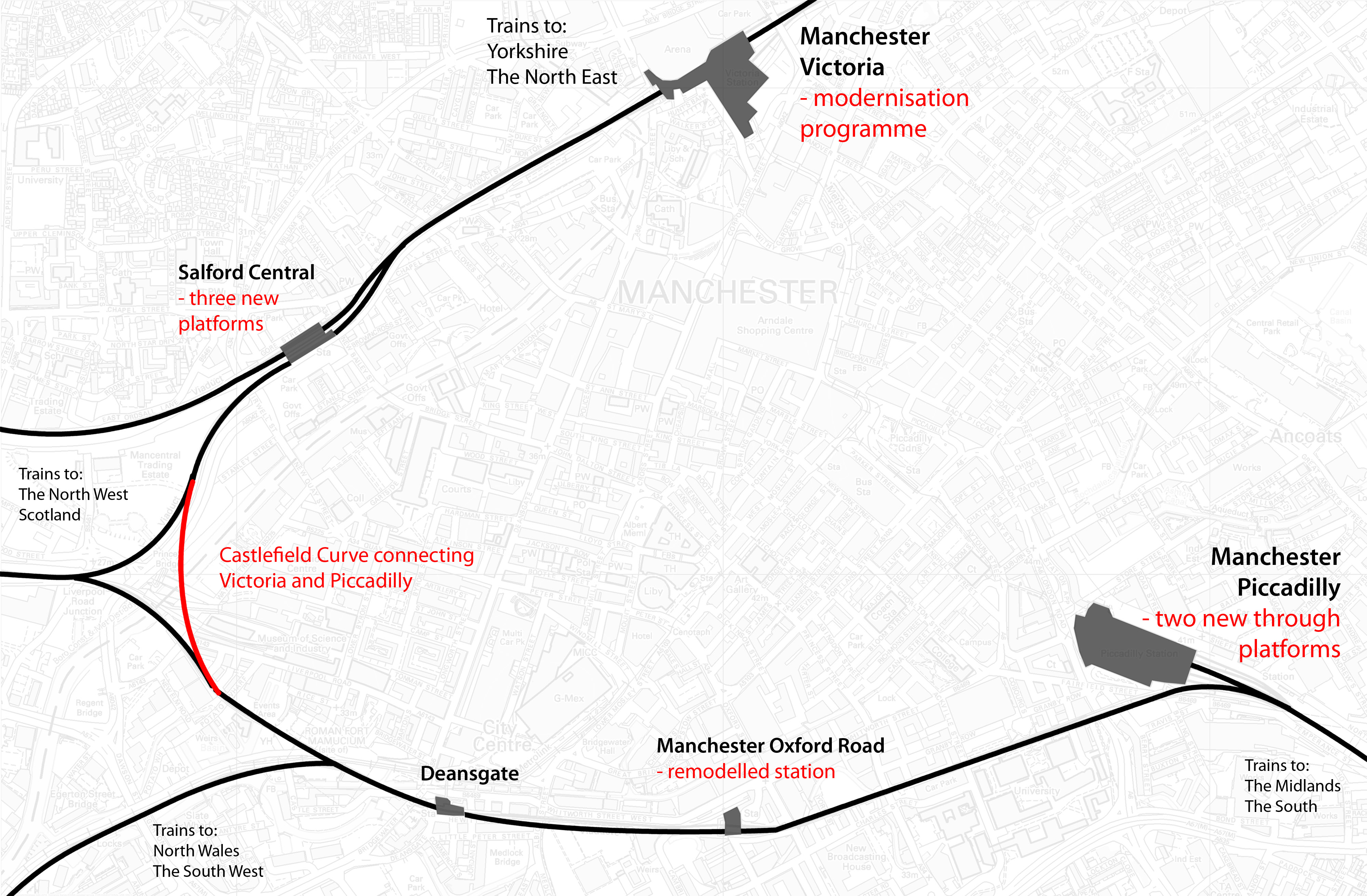
A map of the stations in the group and future improvements as part of the Northern Hub. Salford Central is not part of the Manchester station group.

Many journeys which call at Manchester stations slow down due to the populated nature of Greater Manchester and congested routes; Network Rail have described it as a 'bottleneck'. In 2010 the Manchester hub study was released with a series of proposals to decreasing journey times.

The Ordsall Chord (also known as the Castlefield Curve) was opened in 2017, which now links all four of Manchester's main stations. Other proposals are yet to start construction. Two new through platforms were to be built at Piccadilly and Victoria be upgraded. In May 2023 the Department for Transport confirmed that the proposals for two new platforms at Piccadilly were to be withdrawn. The implementation of the Northern Hub proposals would reduce journey times to and from Liverpool by 15 minutes, Leeds by 15 minutes and Sheffield by 5 minutes.

== Stations ==
=== In use ===
Station	Image	Location	Managed by	National services	Annual entry/exit (millions) 2018/19	Annual entry/exit (millions) 2019/20	Annual entry/exit (millions) 2020/21	Annual entry/exit (millions) 2021/22	Annual entry/exit (millions) 2022/23	Open date	Terminal platforms	Through platforms	Category
Deansgate		Deansgate	Northern	Northern	▲0.456	▲1.323	▼0.213	▲0.805	▲0.968	1886	0	2	D
Oxford Road		Oxford Road	Northern	East Midlands Railway; Northern; TransPennine Express; Transport for Wales	▲9.301	▼6.366	▼1.026	▲3.872	▲4.658	1849	1 (none in future plans – see Northern Hub)	4	C1
Piccadilly		Piccadilly	Network Rail	Avanti West Coast; CrossCountry; East Midlands Railway; Northern; TransPennine Express; Transport for Wales	▲30.133	▲32.198	▼5.188	▲19.581	▲23.558	1842	12	2 (4 in future plans – see Northern Hub)	A
Victoria		Hunts Bank	Northern	Northern; TransPennine Express	▲8.914	▲9.570	▼1.542	▲5.820	▲7.003	1844	2	4	B
Total					▲48.805	▲49.459	▼7.969	▲30.078	▲36.187		15	12	

== Closed ==
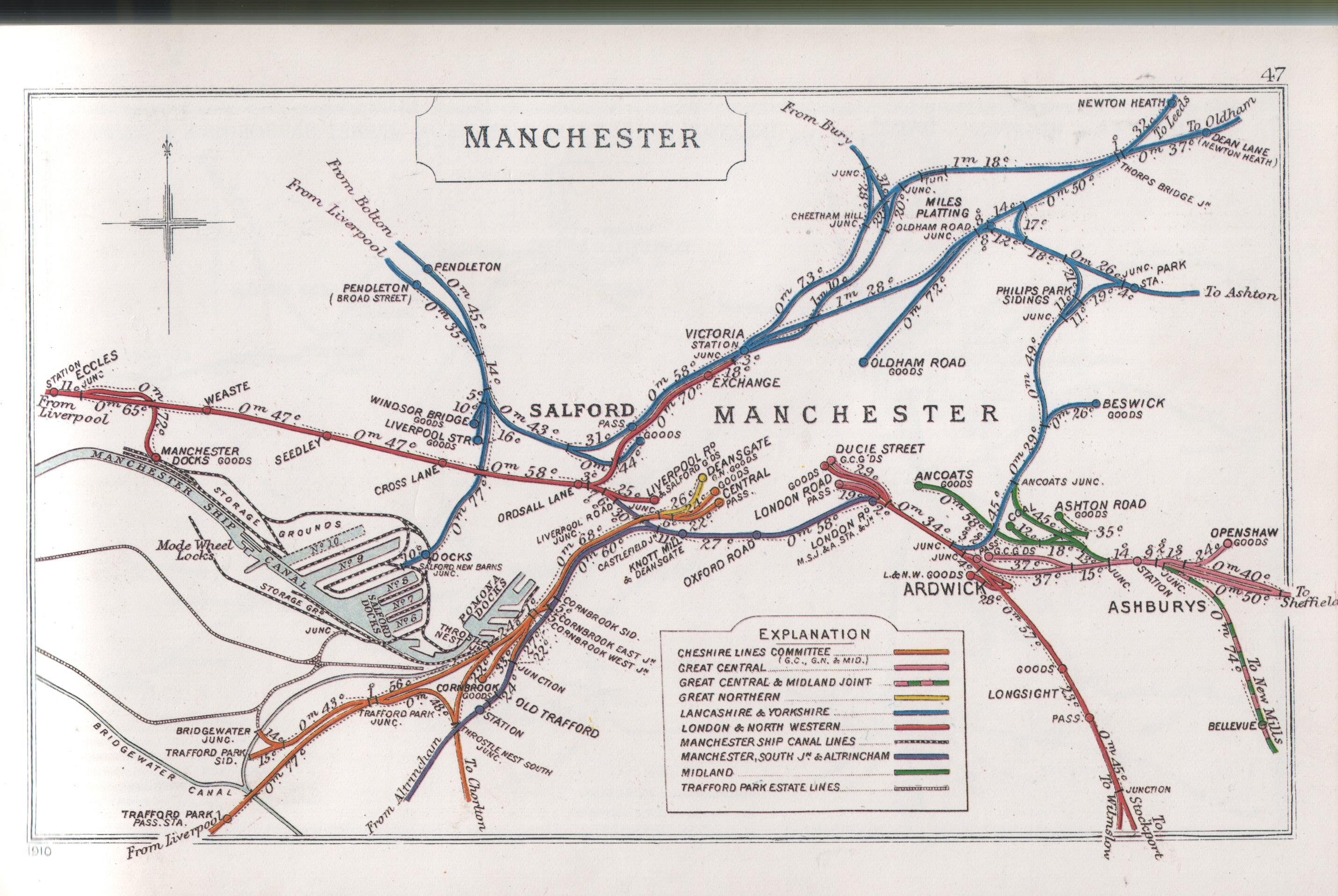
A map of Manchester railway junctions and stations in 1910.

One of the first inter-city railway stations in the world was Manchester Liverpool Road station on Liverpool Street. On 15 September 1830, the Liverpool and Manchester Railway opened and services terminated at the station. Part of the station frontage remains, as does the goods warehouse. Both of these structures are Grade I protected and are part of the Museum of Science and Industry.

All four of Manchester's termini (Piccadilly, Mayfield, Exchange and Victoria) were not recommended for closure in the first Beeching Report, but the reduced rail traffic caused by the closure of other railway lines meant services were transferred to Piccadilly and Victoria. Consequently, trains to Exchange and Central stations were withdrawn; the latter was granted Grade II* and later converted into an arena and exhibition centre.

Station	Image	Location	Managed by	Open date	Closed date	Terminal platforms	Through platforms	Notes
Central		Castlefield	London Midland Region of British Railways	1886	1969	9	0	Closed as part of the Beeching cuts in 1969. Now used as a conference and exhibition centre. Was shortlisted for High Speed 2 terminus.
Exchange		Salford	London, Midland and Scottish Railway	1884	1969	0	5	Had the longest platform in the world.
Liverpool Road		Liverpool Street	Liverpool and Manchester Railway	1830	1844	2	0	The first urban train station in the world
Mayfield		Piccadilly	London and North Western Railway	1910	1960 (to passengers); 1986 (closed)	5	0	Located adjacent to Piccadilly. Station remains today and can be seen on approaching Piccadilly.

== See also ==
- Station group
