= Mosley Street tram stop =

Former Manchester Metrolink tram stop

Mosley Street
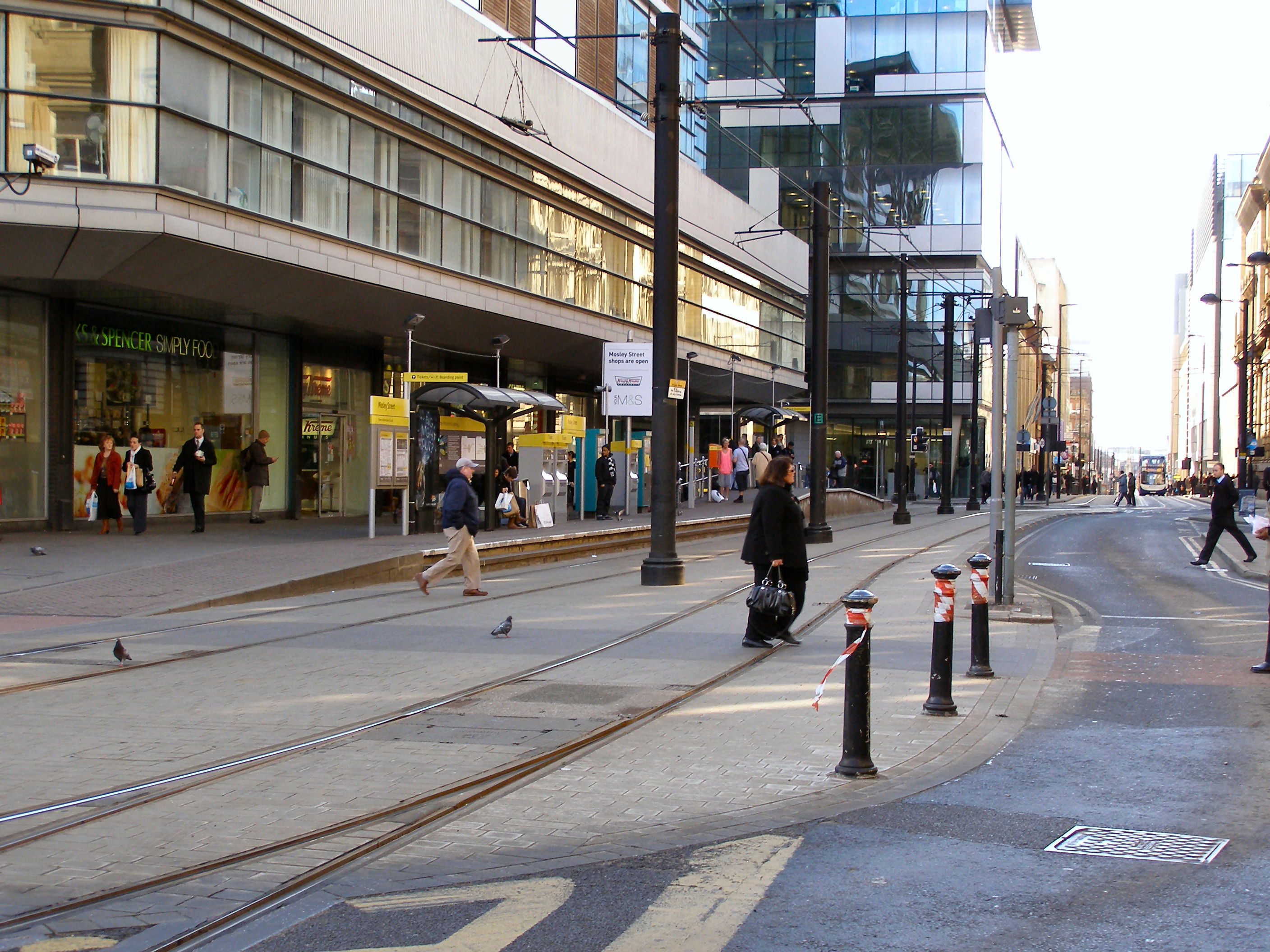
- The former station while still in use in 2010

General information
- Location: Manchester city centre, Manchester; England
- Coordinates: 53.4808°N 2.2390°W
- Grid reference: SJ842982
- System: Metrolink station
- Line: First City Crossing
- Platforms: 1

Other information
- Status: Closed
- Fare zone: D (City)

History
- Opened: 27 April 1992
- Closed: 18 May 2013
- Original company: Metrolink
Route map
Location

Mosley Street was a tram stop in the City Zone (now Zone 1) of Greater Manchester's Metrolink light rail system which closed on 18 May 2013. It was located on Mosley Street in Manchester city centre and was the last unidirectional stop on the Metrolink, with a single platform serving southbound passengers travelling towards Altrincham Interchange, Eccles Interchange, MediaCityUK and St Werburgh's Road only.

Mosley Street tram stop opened on 27 April 1992, as part of Phase 1 of Metrolink's construction. The only remaining example in the City Zone, it was designed with a varied height platform, partly full-height with ramped lower sections. When a service was worked by two coupled T-68 vehicles, the rear vehicle extended mechanical steps to allow access at the low-platform sections - a feature absent in the newer M5000 vehicles.

== History ==
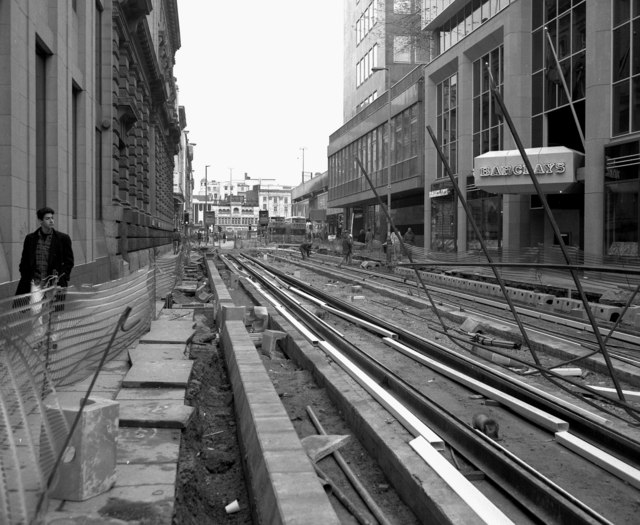
Mosley Street tram tracks being laid in 1990

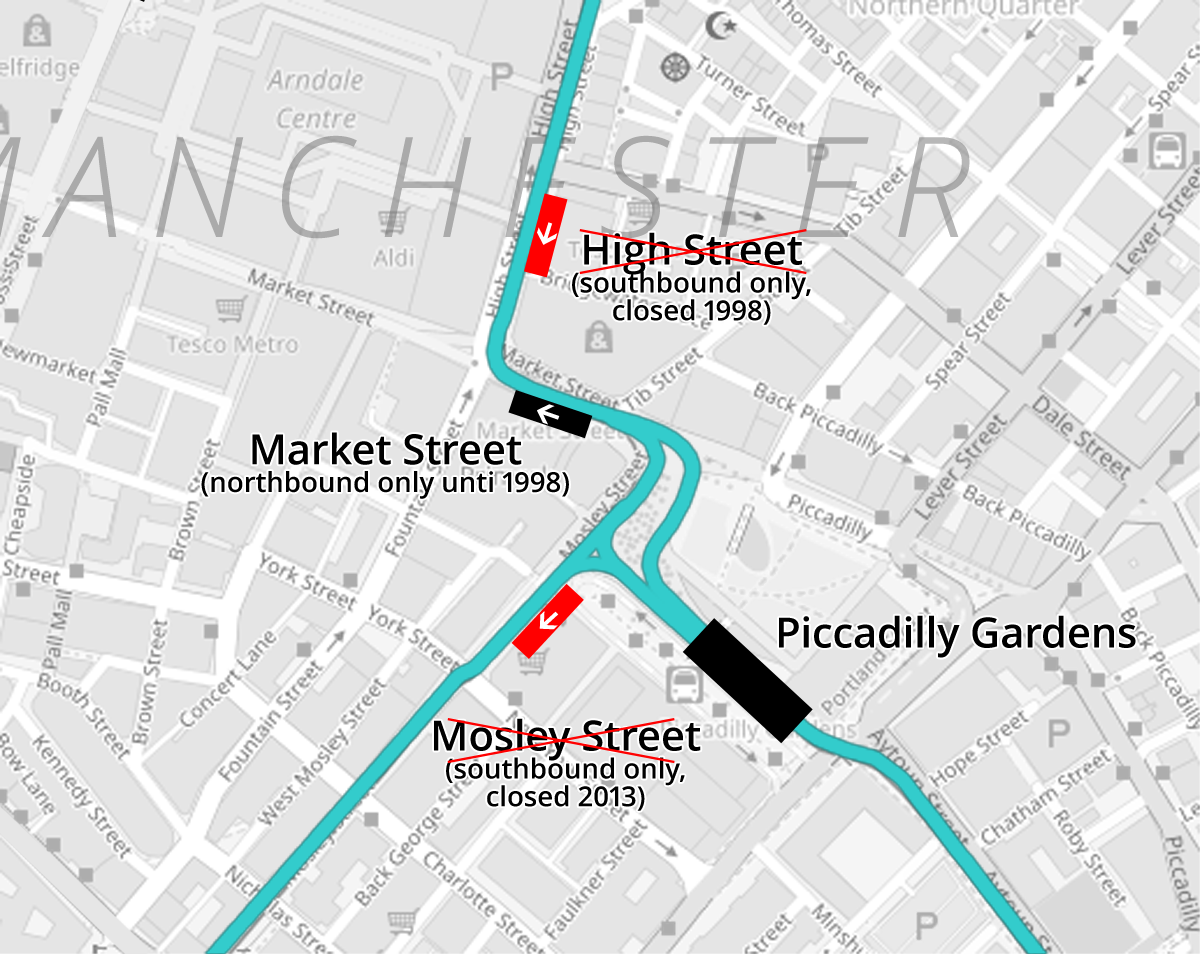
Map of the original 1992 layout of city centre trams stops showing Mosley Street (southbound), Market Street (northbound) and High Street (southbound) tram stops

When the Metrolink network opened in 1992, Mosley Street, along with High Street and Market Street tram stops were each originally built with a single-platform construction and one-way operation due to constraints on available space in the road layout. Market Street was reconfigured in 1998 to handle trams in both directions and High Street tram stop was closed, leaving Mosley Street as the only unidirectional stop on the network.

Following the 2009 City Centre Track Upgrade Project, all other Metrolink street-level stops in the City Zone were rebuilt to full platform height. This change was carried out to remove the need for retractable steps, which were proving technically problematic (the new fleet of M5000 trams had been built without retractable steps). The new platforms can also accommodate double-length vehicles.

Mosley Street was the only tram stop in Manchester not upgraded. A review of the stop's future was conducted and found that the stop could cause congestion for trams at the Piccadilly delta junction when additional services are implemented. The report also noted that the tight confines around the stop location meant that rebuilding the platform to the new specifications would impact on pedestrian flows and access to adjacent retail establishments.

With two other Metrolink stops in close proximity (Piccadilly Gardens, 160 metres (520 ft), and Market Street), the expense of a platform upgrade was not considered to be economically or operationally justifiable. The decision was taken in February 2010 to close the stop.

The last tram (3018) departed Mosley Street at 00:55 on 18 May 2013, on a service to Altrincham.

Preceding station	Manchester Metrolink	Following station
Former services
St Peter's Square towards Altrincham	Altrincham–Bury (peak only)	Market Street One-way operation
St Peter's Square towards Altrincham	Altrincham–Piccadilly	Piccadilly Gardens One-way operation
St Peter's Square towards Eccles	Eccles–Piccadilly	Piccadilly Gardens One-way operation
St Peter's Square towards St Werburgh's Road	St Werburgh's Road–Rochdale Railway Station	Market Street One-way operation
