= High Street tram stop =

Former Manchester Metrolink tram stop

High Street
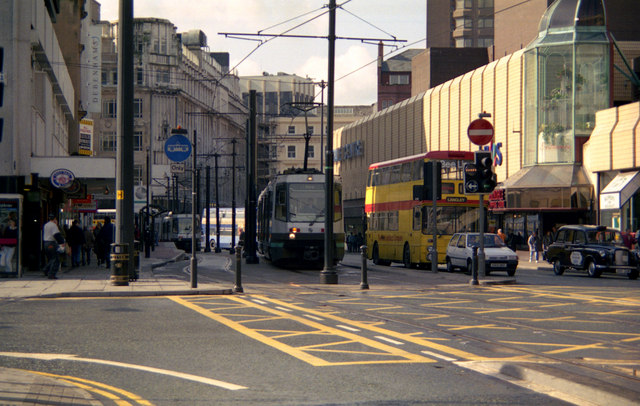
- High Street tram stop in 1993, visible on the left

General information
- Location: Manchester city centre, Manchester; England
- Coordinates: 53.48250°N 2.23944°W
- Grid reference: SJ842984
- System: Metrolink station
- Line: First City Crossing
- Platforms: 1

Other information
- Status: Closed
- Fare zone: D (City)

History
- Opened: 27 April 1992; Southbound only
- Closed: 10 August 1998
- Original company: Metrolink
Route map
Location

High Street was a tram stop on Greater Manchester's light rail Metrolink network, located in Manchester city centre, England. It was on the east side of High Street opposite Manchester Arndale, between the present Shudehill tram stop and Market Street tram stop.

The stop opened on 27 April 1992. Market Street (which opened the same day, and was just around the corner) and High Street Metrolink stops effectively formed a single station staggered across a road junction, with different stop names for each platform: southbound vehicles (going towards Piccadilly Gardens and St Peter's Square) stopped at the High Street stop, and northbound vehicles (going towards Victoria) stopped at Market Street. (Note: Shudehill tram stop did not open until 2003, and so the next stop for northbound trams after High Street was Manchester Victoria station.) High Street, Market Street and Mosley Street tram stops were each originally built with a single-platform construction and one-way operation due to constraints on available space in the road layout.

Market Street was modified to handle traffic in both directions when the street was closed to traffic, and the High Street platform was demolished in 1998 after six years' service.

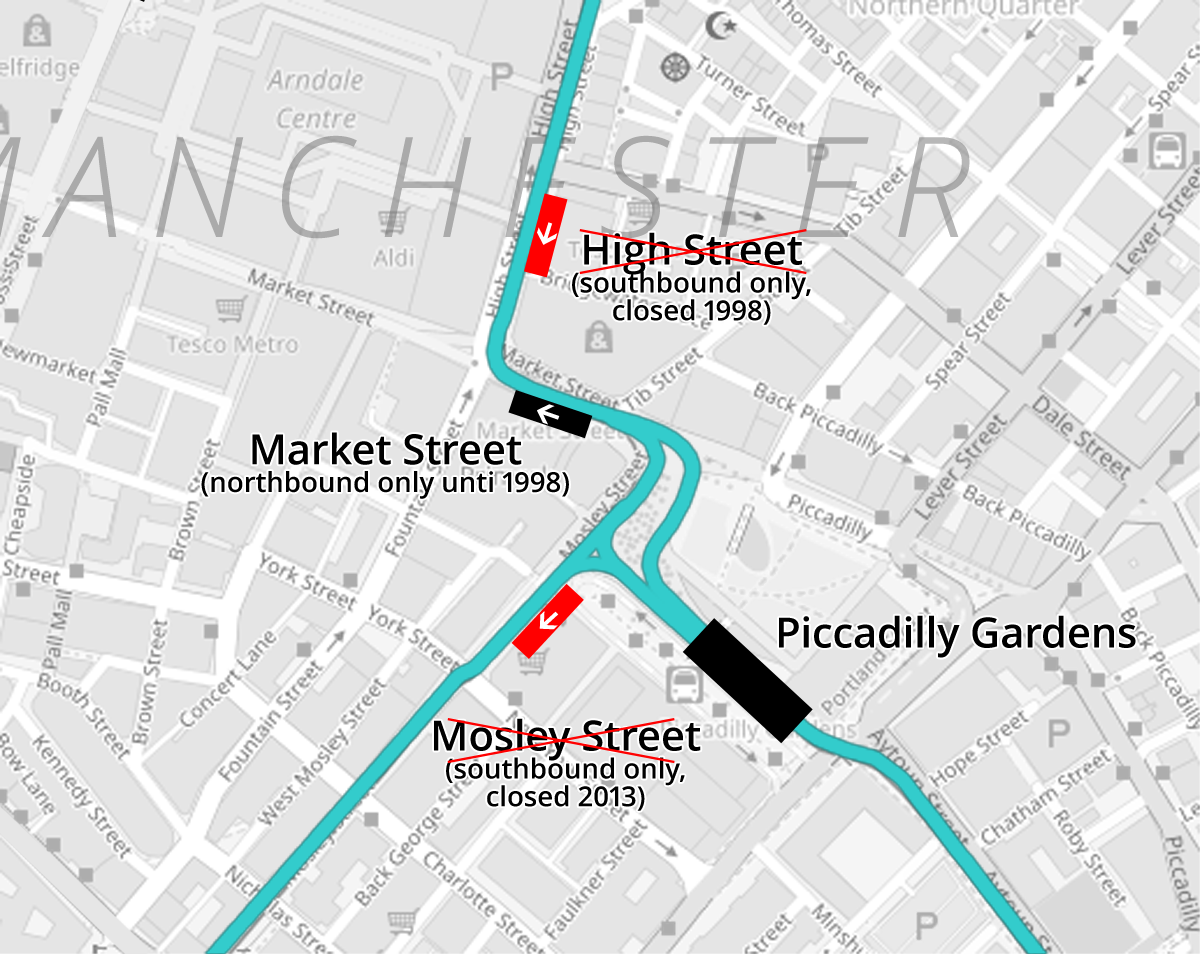
Map of the original layout of Market Street (northbound) and High Street (southbound) tram stops in 1992

== Notes ==
Preceding station	Manchester Metrolink	Following station
Former services
Mosley Street towards Altrincham	Altrincham–Bury (peak only)	Victoria One-way operation
Piccadilly Gardens towards Bury	Bury–Piccadilly reverse	Victoria One-way operation
