= City Lines (Manchester Metrolink) =

Central Manchester Metrolink lines

The three City Lines (sometimes referred to collectively as the City Line) of the Manchester Metrolink light rail network make up the central section of the network in Manchester city centre, where the other eight lines radiating away from the city centre converge. On the City Lines, trams largely run along semi-pedestrianised streets rather than on their own separate alignment.

The first city centre route ran from Victoria to G-Mex, this route now referred to as the First City Crossing. A spur to Piccadilly opened later, also creating a three-way delta junction in the pedestrianised Piccadilly Gardens area. The Second City Crossing (2CC) from Victoria to St Peter's Square was built to ease congestion on the original First City Crossing. It opened in two halves in 2015 and 2017 and added one additional stop to the network at Exchange Square.

== History ==
The Manchester Metrolink began operation in 1992. The Metrolink was initially designed to link Manchester Victoria and Manchester Piccadilly rail stations, as well as connect the converted National Rail lines, the Bury Line and the MSJ&AR Line, into a single network.

The first modern tram line to run through Manchester city centre at street-level was the line from Victoria to G-Mex via High Street/Market Street, which is now referred to as the First City Crossing (1CC), which opened to passengers on 27 April 1992. Also a 0.4-mile (0.7 km) branch to Piccadilly station, which diverges at a three-way junction (known as the 'delta junction') connecting with 1CC was opened. The Piccadilly spur commenced operations on 20 July 1992, and was officially opened the following week. Piccadilly tram stop was initially signposted and referred to as "Piccadilly Undercroft".

A few years later, High Street and Market Street tram stops which both served trams in the southbound and northbound directions respectively were closed, and replaced with a new bi-directional island platform stop at Market Street on 10 August 1998, following the pedestrianisation of Market Street.

Shudehill tram stop was opened on 31 March 2003 between Market Street and Victoria. This was to become an interchange with a new bus station, which would open in 2006. The G-Mex Exhibition Centre, the namesake of G-Mex tram stop, was renamed Manchester Central in September 2007, so G-Mex was renamed Deansgate-Castlefield in Sepmteber 2010. Mosley Street stop was closed in May 2013 to improve congestion and journey times and increase capacity.

The Second City Crossing (2CC) is a second Metrolink route across Manchester city centre, first proposed in 2011 as a means to improve capacity, flexibility and reliability as the rest of the system expanded. It was funded by the Greater Manchester Transport Fund. Following the submission of a planning document under the Transport and Works Act 1992, and a public inquiry held throughout 2013, the Second City Crossing was granted approval on 8 October 2013 by the Secretary of State for Transport, Patrick McLoughlin, and signed off on 28 October 2013 by the Greater Manchester Combined Authority.

Construction started in early 2014 on the new Exchange Square tram stop, and the first tracks of the line were laid in late November 2014. The first part of the 2CC line opened on 6 December 2015, and only operated between Victoria and Exchange Square. The first test tram to run the entire route ran on 1 December 2016 and the whole 2CC line opened for public service on 26 February 2017.

== Route ==
=== First City Crossing (1CC) ===
The First City Crossing route starts at Victoria, specifically on the south edge of the Miller Street road bridge. North of this point is the Bury Line. The Second City Crossing splits off south of Victoria, whilst this route continues on to Shudehill, running uphill on Balloon Street. It then crosses Shudehill (road) and runs in a tram-only section along High Street to Market Street tram stop. The route takes two sharp turns either end of the Market Street stop, then continues on down Mosley Street, passing by the delta junction at Piccadilly Gardens, connecting the Piccadilly spur. The 1CC route continues to St Peter's Square. The 2CC route merges again at different points just south of St Peter's Square. The route continues over a bridge until a few metres west of Deansgate-Castlefield stop, where the Altrincham Line begins.

=== Second City Crossing (2CC) ===
The Second City Crossing begins at Long Millgate south of Victoria, then merges onto Corporation Street running south to Exchange Square stop, where it enters a tram-only section for a couple hundred metres. It merges back onto Corporation Street, then Cross Street mixed with other road traffic, then takes a sharp turn onto Princess Street before Albert Square. Another sharp turn to the right takes it into St Peter's Square's Platform B (outbound) and Platform D (inbound). South of the platforms, the outbound track merges with the 1CC, ending its route. The inbound track merges further south near Windmill Street next to the Manchester Central Convention Complex.

=== Piccadilly spur ===
A short spur off the First City Crossing takes trams to Piccadilly Gardens stop serving a bus station. The line crosses Portland Street and runs in a reserved section parallel to Aytoun Street until crossing it and taking another reserved route down to London Road. It crosses London Road and enters the Manchester Piccadilly station undercroft, entering Piccadilly tram stop. The route continues east of Piccadilly until the end of the undercroft section a few metres before the end of the tunnel, where the East Manchester Line begins.

== Fare Zone 1 ==
The central fare zone, today called Zone 1 (since 2019) used to be called the City zone starting 1992, among the other lettered fare zones (A-G, excluding D, which was implied to be the City Zone). The Eccles Line was added, and was entirely in Zone H in 2000. In 2009, the other fare zones were taken out of use, and only the City Zone was retained. In 2013, the Piccadilly spur was extended to Droylsden and Ashton-under-Lyne. The new line was called the East Manchester Line. The first stop after Piccadilly on this new route, New Islington, was not initially included in the "City Zone" when it opened, but the zone boundary was changed in 2014 to also include New Islington. When Metrolink fares changed from a point-to-point system to a zonal scheme in 2019, the "City Zone" was renamed as Zone 1.

Metrolink tickets allowing travel to a Zone 1 stop also allow for travel within Zone 1. Passengers who travel on rail services from the Greater Manchester area into one of the four railway stations of the Manchester station group (Manchester Piccadilly, Manchester Oxford Road, Manchester Victoria, and Deansgate) will be issued with a ticket stating the destination as Manchester Ctlz as opposed to Manchester Stns. This allows visitors to use Metrolink trams within Zone 1 for free on the presentation of a Manchester Ctlz rail ticket. The Freedom of the City scheme was introduced in 2005 by the Greater Manchester Passenger Transport Executive and retained as part of the new zonal ticketing system introduced in January 2019.

National visitors from outside Greater Manchester with Manchester Stns as the destination are not permitted free use of Metrolink, as it is a locally funded transport service by TfGM, and receives no national government subsidy.

== Maps ==
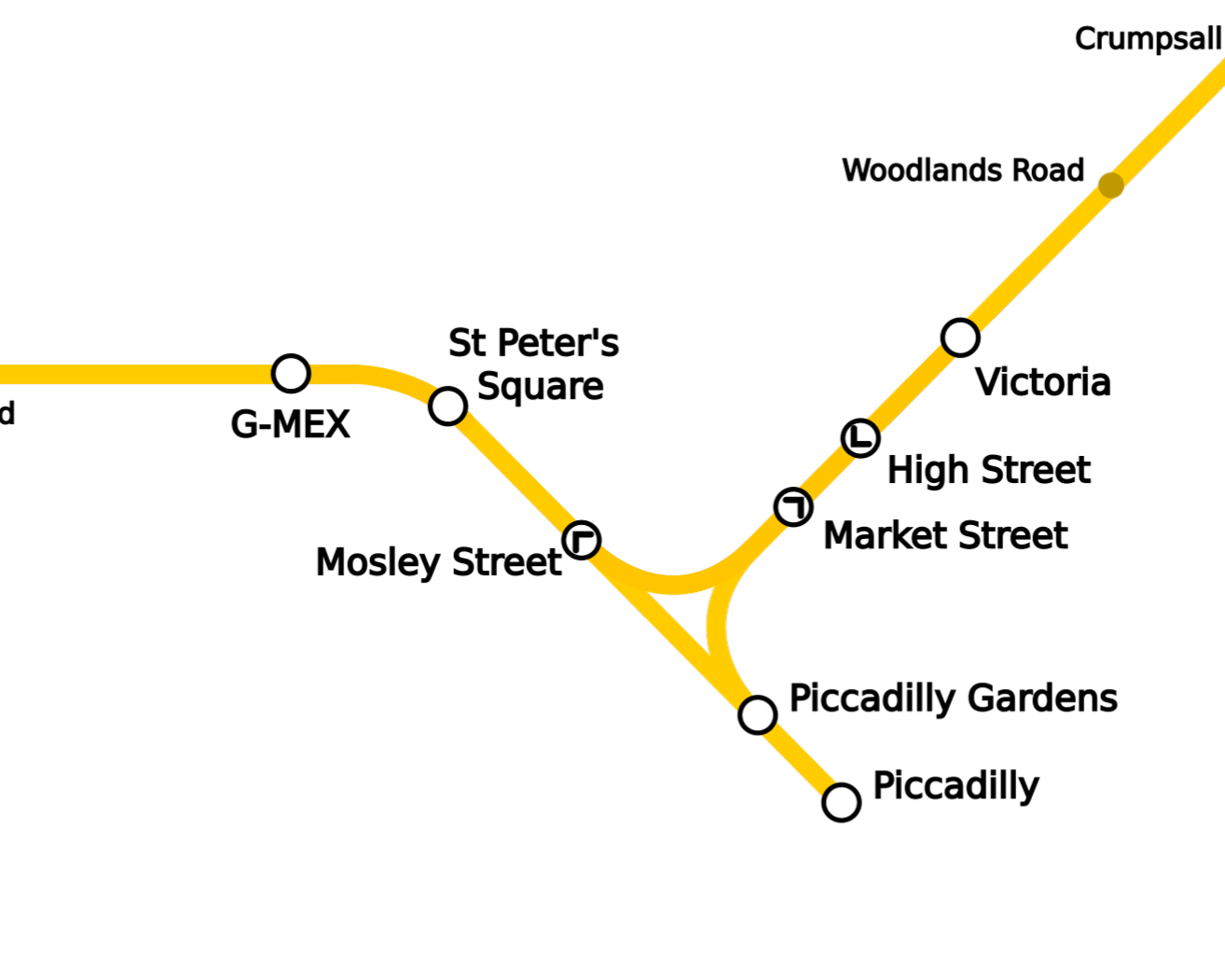
(1992) - Just 1CC and the Piccadilly spur have opened.

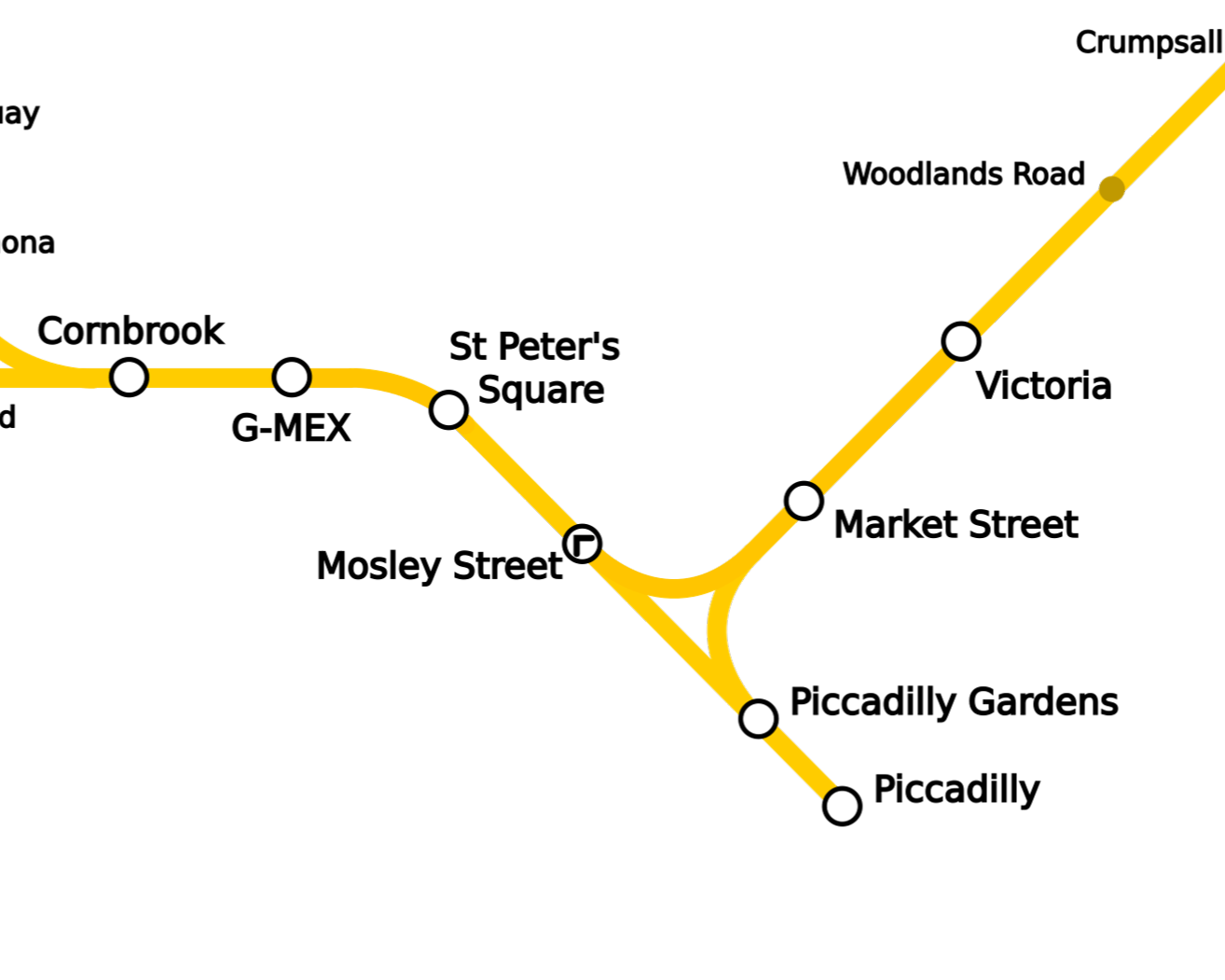
(1999) - High Street closed and Market Street was rebuilt in 1998. Cornbrook opened on the Altrincham Line in 1999.

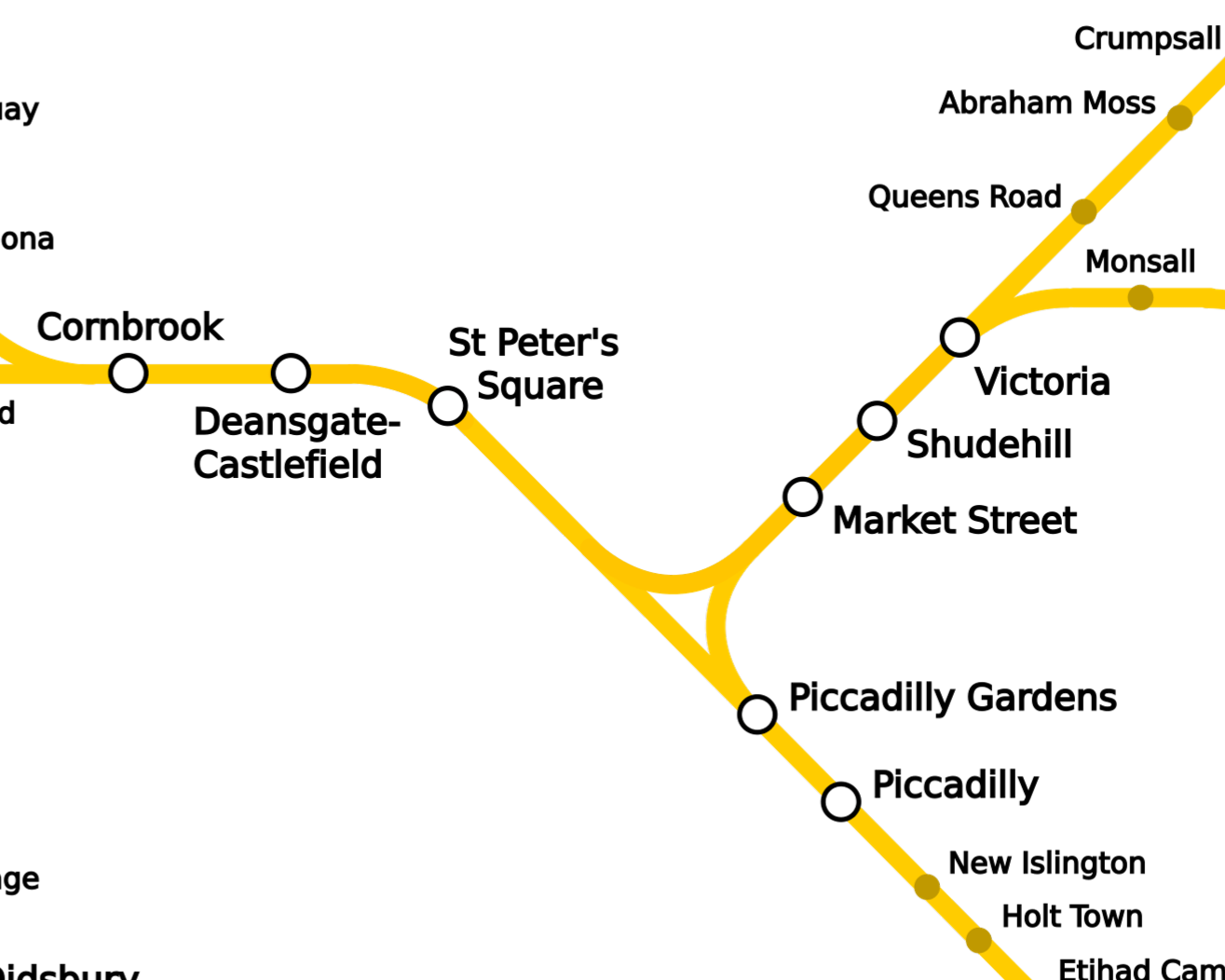
(2013) - Shudehill opened in 2003, G-Mex renamed to Deansgate-Castlefield in 2010, Mosley Street closed in 2013.

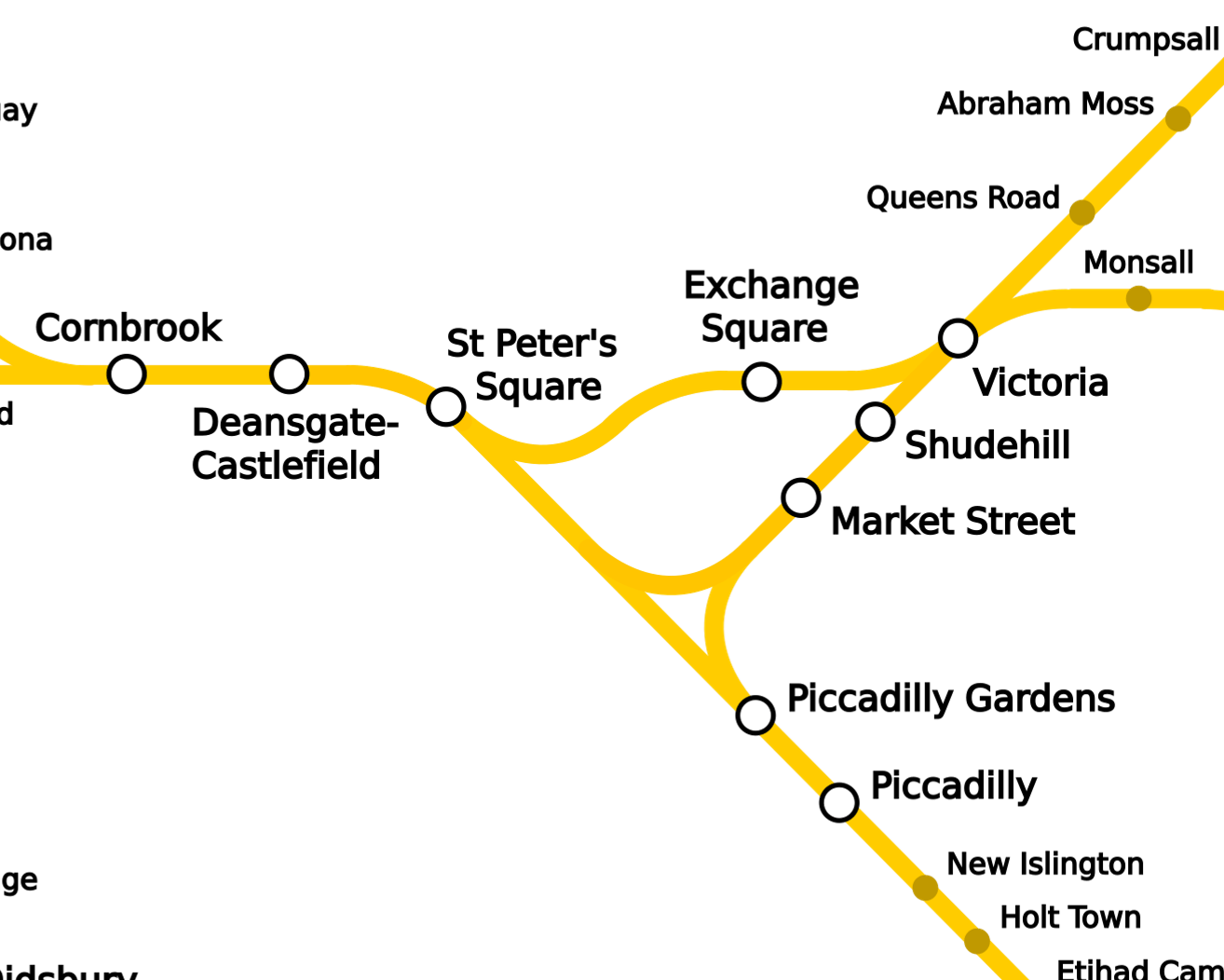
(2017) - Exchange Square and the Second City Crossing opened in two halves in 2015 and 2017.
