= Zone 1 =

Zone 1 may refer to:

- Hardiness zone, a geographically defined zone in which a specific category of plant life is capable of growing
- London fare zone 1, of the Transport for London zonal system
- Zone 1 (Manchester Metrolink)
- Zone 1 of Milan
- Zone 1 (Nova Scotia health region)
- Zone 1, usually written with Roman numeral as "Zone I", lies in the 0 to X range of the photographic Zone System
- Zone 1 is the lowest of the 5 zones in the Zoladz method for rating exercise intensity
