= Manchester Central Convention Complex =

Exhibition and conference centre in Manchester, England

- Former names: Greater Manchester Exhibition Centre (1986–2006): GMEX

General information
- Architectural style: 19th-century railway terminus, cast iron and red brick
- Location: Manchester City Centre, Windmill Street; Petersfield, Manchester; Greater Manchester M2 3GX; England
- Coordinates: 53.476°N 2.247°W
- Construction started: 1982
- Completed: 1986
- Opened: 21 March 1986
- Renovated: 2008–09
- Cost: £20 million (1986)
- Renovation cost: £30 million
- Owner: Manchester City Council

Height
- Height: 90 feet (27 m)

Dimensions
- Other dimensions: Arch span: 210 feet (64 m); Hall length: 550 feet (168 m) long

Technical details
- Structural system: 2-storey brick building with single-span segmental iron and glass arched roof

Design and construction
- Architecture firm: EGS Design
- Main contractor: Alfred McAlpine
- Designations

Listed Building – Grade II*
- Official name: G MEX
- Designated: 18 December 1963
- Reference no.: 1270514

Renovating team
- Renovating firm: Stephenson Bell

Website
- Venue website

Manchester Central Convention Complex
- Operator: Manchester Central Convention Complex Ltd.
- Public transit: St Peter's Square; Deansgate-Castlefield; Deansgate; Manchester Oxford Road

Manchester Central Convention Complex (commonly known as Manchester Central and formerly GMEX (Greater Manchester Exhibition Centre)) is an exhibition and conference centre converted from the former Manchester Central railway station in Manchester, England. The building has a distinctive arched roof with a span of 64 metres (210 ft) – the second-largest railway station roof span in the United Kingdom, and was granted Grade II* listed building status in 1963.

After 89 years as a railway terminus, it closed to passengers in May 1969. It was renovated as an exhibition centre formerly known as the G-Mex Centre in 1982 and was Manchester's primary music concert venue until the construction of the Manchester Arena. After renovation the venue reverted to its former name Manchester Central in 2007.

From April 2020 until March 2021, the complex became a temporary field hospital for non-critical COVID-19 patients, part of a network of temporary NHS Nightingale Hospitals.

== History ==
=== Manchester Central railway station ===
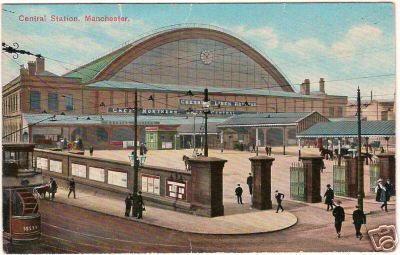
An illustrative image of the old Manchester Central railway station, dated 1905.

The complex was originally Manchester Central railway station, one of the city's main railway terminals.

Designed by Sir John Fowler, the station was opened in July 1880 by the Cheshire Lines Committee. The station served as the terminus for Midland Railway express trains to London St Pancras. The station's large wrought-iron single-span arched roof, spanning 210 feet (64 m), 550 feet (168 m) long and 90 feet (27 m) high – was a noted piece of railway engineering and is the widest unsupported iron arch in Britain after the Barlow train shed at London St Pancras.

At its height, in the 1930s, more than 400 trains used the station every day. The station operated for 89 years, before closing in May 1969.

=== GMEX Centre ===
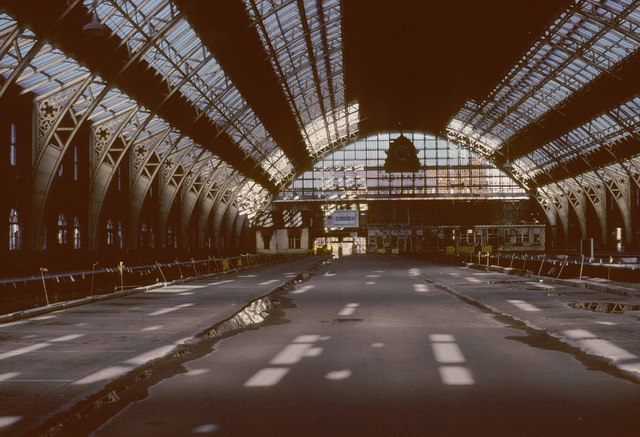
The interior of the derelict station before its renovation in 1982

In 1978, the structure was acquired by Greater Manchester County Council to redevelop as a concert venue. In 1982, construction work was undertaken by Alfred McAlpine. It was the centrepiece of the regeneration plan for the area and wider Castlefield district. The hall covered 10,000 m^{2} (110,000 sq ft) and could be partitioned into various sized units for different exhibitions. Initial construction work concentrated on repairing the derelict structure and re-pointing brickwork which took 18 months. The Greater Manchester Exhibition Centre or G-Mex Centre was opened by Queen Elizabeth II in 1986 after four years of renovation.

In 2001 the Manchester International Convention Centre (MICC) was added, comprising an 804-seat auditorium and breakout rooms and the Great Northern Hall. In 2005, the company running the complex was bought by Manchester City Council. G-Mex was Manchester's primary concert venue from 1986 to 1995. Its position as a concert venue diminished after the opening of the Manchester (then NYNEX) Arena in 1995.

=== Manchester Central ===
In January 2007, the venue was renamed Manchester Central, evoking the memory of the former station and converted into an exhibition and conference centre. The building was renovated at a cost of £30 million in 2008 by Manchester-based architects, Stephenson Bell. The first phase to create a foyer took from February to November 2008.

The second phase, completed towards the end of 2009, included an extended foyer to the Grade II listed Central Hall. The old smoked-glass structure was demolished and replaced by a flat-roofed, clear-glazed structure exposing more of the original architecture. The final phase, completed in September 2010, focused on the rear of the building. New event spaces were built and rooms refurbished to increase the venue's range and size of meeting and banqueting spaces.

== Events ==
During its days as the GMEX Centre, the venue was used for hosting rock concerts. Not long after its official opening, Factory Records used the venue for their Festival of the Tenth Summer in July 1986 to celebrate the 10th anniversary of punk in the city, and included appearances by the Smiths and Factory Records stalwarts New Order. James appeared in 1990, U2 in June 1992, Metallica in November 1992 on their The Black Album tour and the Cure in November 1992. G-Mex had a seating capacity of 9,500 for end stage concerts and 12,500 for standing events and stopped hosting concerts in 1997, with the last gig by Oasis in December. G-Mex was also the 2002 Commonwealth Games venue for gymnastics, weightlifting, judo and wrestling.

After a nine-year break, it was again used for concerts by Snow Patrol in December 2006 with Morrissey, the Verve, Marilyn Manson, Franz Ferdinand, Manic Street Preachers, Arctic Monkeys, Bloc Party and Hard-Fi holding concerts in 2007. Status Quo have performed there multiple times. The venue hosted concerts by Placebo in December 2009, Arcade Fire, Biffy Clyro, Thirty Seconds to Mars, the Taste of Chaos Tour 2010, deadmau5, Pendulum in December 2010 and the Eighth Plague Tour. In 2011 it hosted the Girls' Day Out Show.

In 2009 and 2010, it played host to the Manchester audition stages of the ITV programme The X Factor. In December 2012, it hosted the finals of series 9 of The X Factor.

In September 2006, the Labour Party moved from traditional seaside venues to hold its annual party conference at the complex. It has also hosted conferences for the Confederation of British Industry, ECOFIN, the Liberal Democrats, the Conservative Party and the Green Party.

The venue was also the filming location of Ninja Warrior UK between 2015 and 2022.

The venue was selected to host the 2021 Wheelchair Rugby League World Cup final, which saw England beat France 28–24 to lift their second world cup title equalling the record set by the runners-up.

== Transport ==
Located in the heart of the city, Manchester Central is served by two Metrolink tram stops – Deansgate-Castlefield tram stop and St Peter's Square tram stop, both of which are under a five-minute walk from the venue. National Rail local train services serve Deansgate railway station whilst Manchester Piccadilly is a 20-minute walk away.

== Emergency hospital ==
On 27 March 2020, the UK government announced that the building would be converted into an emergency hospital, part of a network of NHS Nightingale Hospitals similar to the NHS Nightingale Hospital London that was already under construction, intended to deal with the COVID-19 pandemic and with 1,000 beds. It opened on 17 April 2020, and was closed in March 2021.

== See also ==
- Grade II* listed buildings in Greater Manchester
- Listed buildings in Manchester-M2
