= Girls' Day Out Show =

Annual fashion event in Glasgow, Scotland

- Status: Active
- Genre: Fashion, Beauty
- Venue: SEC Centre
- Locations: Glasgow, Edinburgh, Manchester
- Country: UK
- Inaugurated: 2009
- Attendance: 16,000+
- Organizer: PSP
- Website: www.girlsdayoutshow.co.uk

The Girls' Day Out Show is an event primarily for women who enjoy fashion, lifestyle and beauty. It is a similar concept to The Clothes Show Live. It was founded in 2009 and has been a growing convention every year, attracting over 16,000 visitors on average.

== History ==
It is run by PSP. Events and the first one held at the SEC Centre in 2009.

Established top model scouts have frequently visited the show and used it as a talent-selection pool. Colours Agency and Select Model Management who represent stars such as Agyness Deyn, The Saturdays, Mischa Barton and Amanda Hendrick attended.

== 2009 ==
Held at the SEC Centre, Glasgow.

It was sponsored by tanning specialist Fake Bake, and in association with Boots and No1 Magazine.

== 2010 ==
Held at the SEC Centre, Glasgow. The Saturday ticket was a sell out.

== 2011 ==
In 2011, it was held in Manchester for the first time. It was at The Central also known as Manchester Central Convention Complex (but more commonly, formerly, known as the G-Mex).

It caused some controversy as a cosmetic surgeon attended the show, providing free ten-minute consultations.

Peter Andre made an appearance and is considered a notable event at Manchester Central Convention Complex.

== 2012 ==
It was held at the SEC Centre in Glasgow from 30 November to 2 December.

The Girls' Day Out Show has been said to play a part in boosting the local economy of where it takes place.

Celebrities like 'Two Shoes' who were runners up on The X Factor also made an appearance.

The stands there such as; FakeBake, Bella's Blush, Fashion Rocks My Soul, The London Perfume Company, Actiderm and Lauren's Way, brought in the highest number of customers to date.

== Media coverage ==
The Girls' Day Out Show has featured in No 1 Magazine and Event Magazine when it announced plans to expand further to Edinburgh, Birmingham, Manchester and Glasgow.

It was a deal on Happli and has been the local press of the moment like The Manchester Evening News.
