= Deansgate-Castlefield tram stop =

Manchester Metrolink tram stop

Deansgate-Castlefield
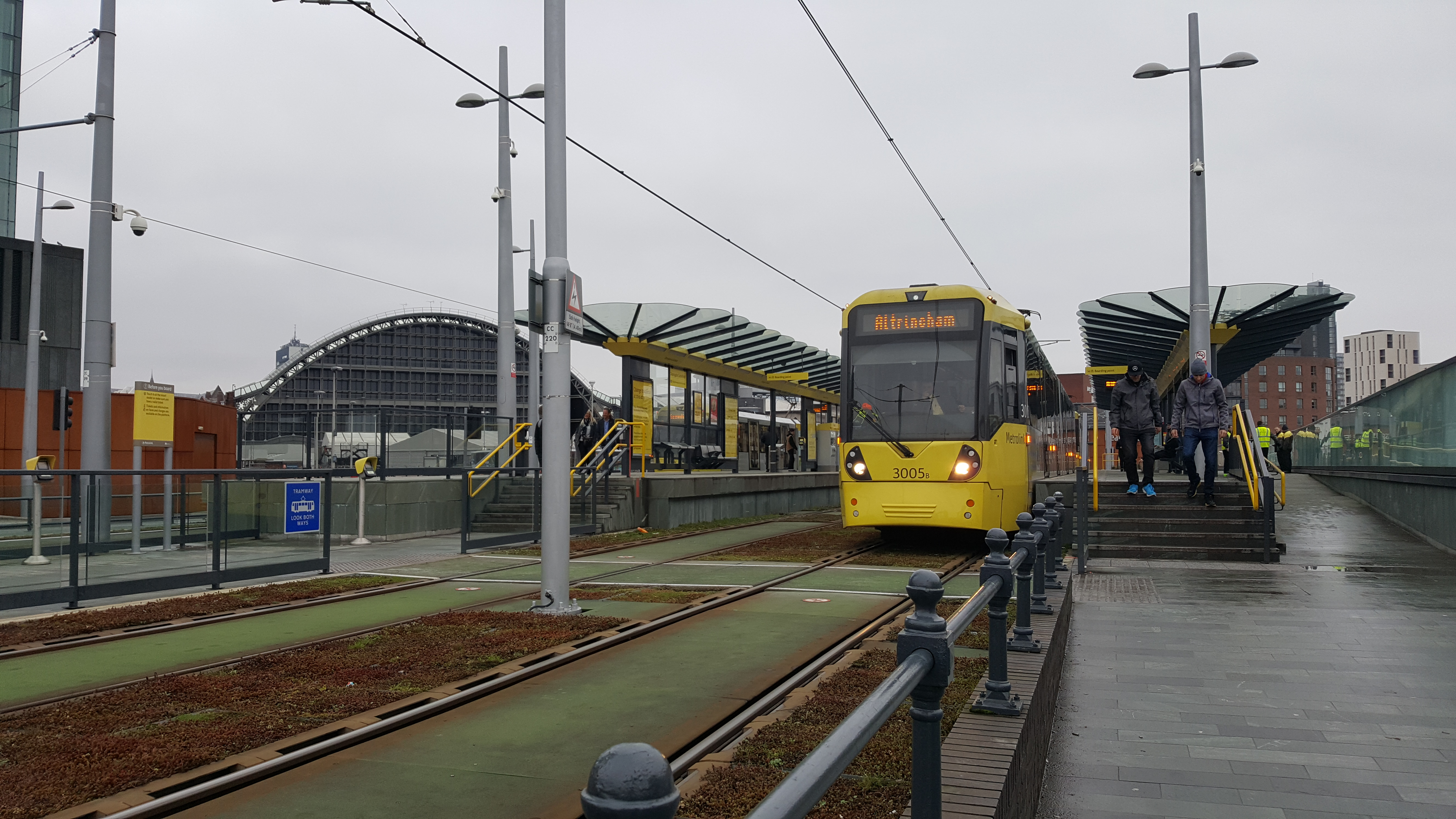

General information
- Location: Castlefield, Manchester; England
- Coordinates: 53.47473°N 2.25032°W
- Grid reference: SJ834975
- System: Metrolink station
- Line: First City Crossing
- Platforms: 3

Other information
- Status: In operation
- Fare zone: 1

History
- Original company: Manchester Metrolink

Key dates
- 27 April 1992: Opened as G-Mex (as terminus)
- 15 June 1992: Opened (for through services)
- 20 September 2010: Renamed Deansgate-Castlefield
- 17 December 2014: Third platform opened
Route map
Location

Deansgate-Castlefield is a tram stop on Greater Manchester's Metrolink light rail system, on Deansgate in the Castlefield area of Manchester city centre. It opened on 27 April 1992 as G-Mex tram stop, taking its name from the adjacent G-Mex Centre, a concert, conference and exhibition venue; the G-Mex Centre was rebranded as Manchester Central in 2007, prompting the Metrolink stop to be renamed on 20 September 2010. The station underwent redevelopment in 2014–15 to add an extra platform in preparation for the completion of the Second City Crossing in 2016–17.

Deansgate-Castlefield serves as a transport hub by integrating with National Rail services from Deansgate railway station by a footbridge. Exits from the station lead to the Great Northern Warehouse, the reconstructed Mamucium Roman Fort, the Beetham Tower, and Deansgate Locks. Part of Zone 1, the stop is one of the most used on the Metrolink network.

== History ==
Manchester Central railway station, one of the city's main railway terminals, was built between 1875–80 by the Cheshire Lines Committee railway company and served as the terminus for Midland Railway express services to London. The station was notable as an engineering feat – its huge wrought-iron single-span arched roof, spanning 210 feet (64 m), 550 feet (168 m) long and 90 feet (27 m) high is claimed to be the widest unsupported iron arch in Britain after London St. Pancras.

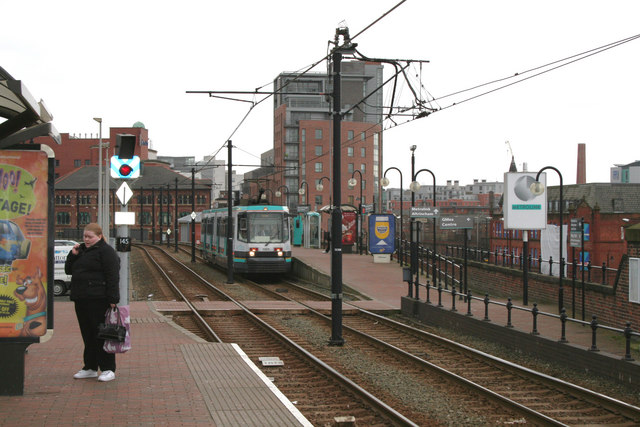
Deansgate-Castlefield in 2007, then known as G-Mex tram stop, prior to redesign

Following the Beeching cuts, the station was deemed surplus to requirements and closed to passengers on 5 May 1969. The listed building survived as a local landmark, and after serving as a car park, the old station was refurbished and re-opened as an exhibition and conference centre.

With the opening of the Metrolink system, rail services were able to operate once more from south Manchester to Central Station; however, instead of trains running into the Central Station arch, light rail vehicles now run alongside the south-eastern side of the former train shed, down a ramp which runs parallel to Lower Mosley Street, before reaching street level where they operate as trams and head towards St Peter's Square. The viaduct arches beneath the station, overlooking the Rochdale Canal, have since been refurbished and converted into the Deansgate Locks development comprising bars, restaurants and a comedy club.

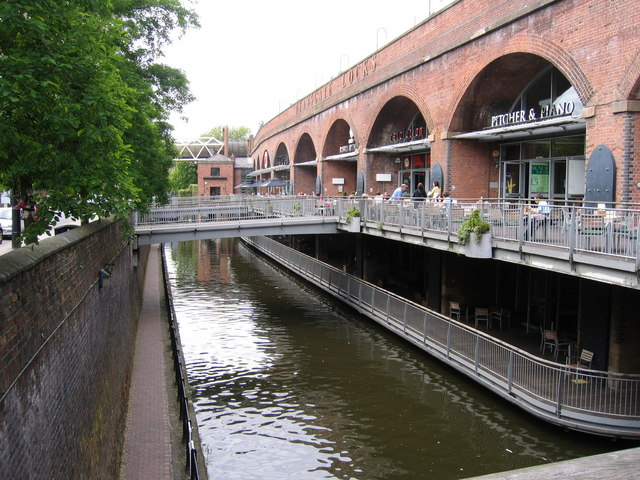
Deansgate Locks underneath the station.

Central Station featured in early proposals to build a light rail system in Manchester; the station featured in 1984 publicity with an interchange to Deansgate; by 1987, the station had acquired the name 'G-Mex' and the system was now known as 'Metrolink'.

=== Renaming ===
In August 2010 Metrolink announced it would be changing the name of the stop from 'G-Mex' to 'Deansgate-Castlefield'. On 2 September 2010, signs at the stop were changed to 'Deansgate-Castlefield'; a couple of days later temporary vinyl GMEX stickers were placed on top which were removed on 20 September 2010 when the name change was made.

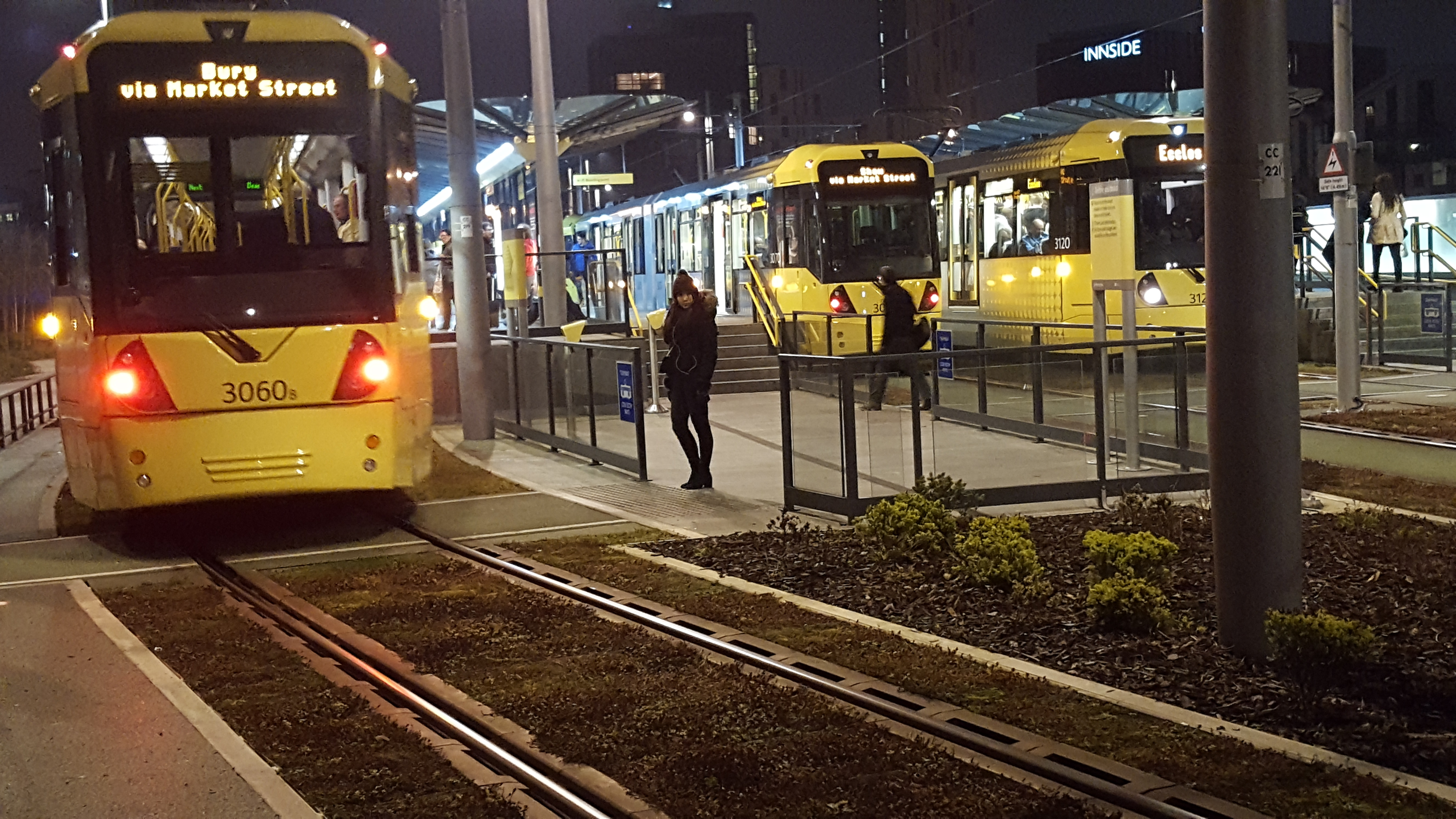
The new platform arrangement

=== 2015 redevelopment ===
It had been thought for some time that the second city crossing (2CC) expansion would require a third platform at the stop. However, 2011 proposals showed St Peter's Square as a major 4-platform interchange, putting the third platform at Deansgate-Castlefield into doubt. Manchester City Council was also known to be working on a proposal to better integrate the tram stop and Deansgate railway station as well as creating a key interchange, which remained unaffected by the 2011 2CC proposals. At MIPIM 2010 proposals were unveiled for a redevelopment of the area behind the conference centre. The ambitious scheme envisioned a pedestrian skypark walkway along the side of the conference centre to ground level creating better pedestrian access to both the conference centre and the city centre itself; a new bridge to link to Deansgate railway station, replacing the tired and unappealing original; and the creation of a new train shed on the viaduct for the tram stop's three platforms including access to ground level. The new island platform opened on 17 December 2014 and additional green themed modifications (such as a living wall) were added in 2015.

== Services ==
Services run every 12 minutes on all routes. Some routes (as indicated) only operate during peak times.

Preceding station	Manchester Metrolink	Following station
Cornbrook towards East Didsbury	East Didsbury–Shaw (peak only)	St Peter's Square towards Shaw and Crompton
Cornbrook towards East Didsbury	East Didsbury–Rochdale	St Peter's Square towards Rochdale Town Centre
Cornbrook towards Manchester Airport	Manchester Airport–Victoria	St Peter's Square towards Victoria
Cornbrook towards Altrincham	Altrincham–Bury (peak only)	St Peter's Square towards Bury
Cornbrook towards Altrincham	Altrincham–Piccadilly	St Peter's Square towards Piccadilly
Cornbrook towards Altrincham	Altrincham–Etihad Campus (evenings and Sundays only)	St Peter's Square towards Etihad Campus
Cornbrook towards Eccles	Eccles–Ashton (peak only)	St Peter's Square towards Ashton-under-Lyne
Cornbrook towards Eccles	Eccles–Ashton via MediaCityUK (off-peak only)	St Peter's Square towards Ashton-under-Lyne
Cornbrook towards MediaCityUK	MediaCityUK–Etihad Campus (peak only)	St Peter's Square towards Etihad Campus
Cornbrook towards The Trafford Centre	The Trafford Centre–Deansgate	Terminus
