= Deansgate railway station =

Railway station in Greater Manchester, England

Deansgate
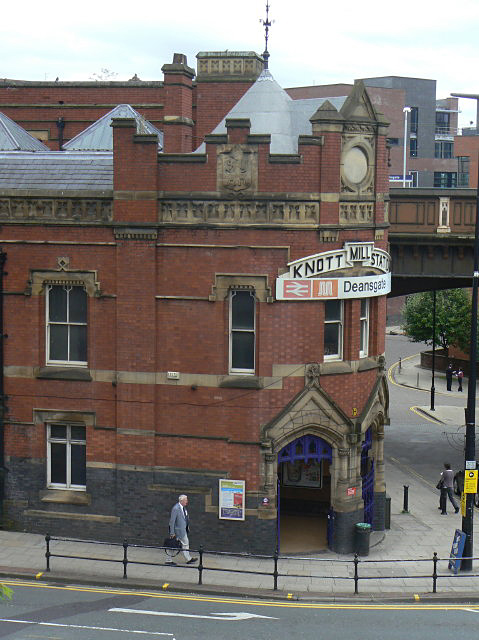

General information
- Location: Manchester city centre, City of Manchester; England
- Coordinates: 53.4742°N 2.2508°W
- Grid reference: SJ834975
- Manager: Northern Trains
- Transit authority: Greater Manchester
- Platforms: 2

Other information
- Station code: DGT
- Classification: DfT category D

History
- Original company: Manchester, South Junction and Altrincham Railway
- Pre-grouping: Manchester, South Junction and Altrincham Railway
- Post-grouping: Manchester, South Junction and Altrincham Railway; London Midland Region of British Railways

Key dates
- 20 July 1849: Opened as Knot Mill and Deansgate
- ?: Renamed Knott Mill and Deansgate
- 3 May 1971: Renamed Deansgate

Passengers
- 2021/22: ▲0.805 million
- 2022/23: ▲0.968 million
- 2023/24: ▲1.059 million
- 2024/25: ▲1.719 million
- 2025/26: ▲1.901 million
Location
Notes
- Passenger statistics from the Office of Rail and Road

Deansgate is a railway station in Manchester city centre, England; it is located 1,100 yards (1 km) west of Manchester Piccadilly, close to Castlefield at the junction of Deansgate and Whitworth Street West. It is part of the Manchester station group.

It is linked to Deansgate-Castlefield tram stop and the Manchester Central Convention Complex by a footbridge built in 1985; Deansgate Locks, The Great Northern Warehouse and the Science and Industry Museum are also nearby.

The platforms are elevated, reached by lift or stairs, or by the walkway from the Manchester Central Complex. The ticket office, staffed full-time, is between street and platform levels. There are no ticket barriers, although manual ticket checks take place on a daily basis.

It is on the Manchester to Preston and the Liverpool–Manchester lines, both used heavily by commuters. Most tickets purchased by passengers to Deansgate are issued to Manchester Stations or Manchester Central Zone; therefore actual usage is not reflected in these statistics, due to the difficulty in splitting the ticket sales correctly between the four grouped stations (Piccadilly, Victoria, Oxford Road and Deansgate).

The station's name was temporarily changed to Olivia Deansgate railway station in February 2026 to celebrate the BRIT Awards happening that month. It was named after Olivia Dean, one of the nominees of the award.

== History ==
The original station buildings were situated on Hewitt Street. The station was opened as Knot Mill and Deansgate on 20 July 1849 by the Manchester, South Junction and Altrincham Railway (MSJAR) near the Manchester terminus ('the Knot Mill station') of the Bridgewater Canal from which travellers could catch a fast packet in 1849 which could get them to Liverpool in four and a half hours for as little as sixpence. This fare was anomalously low because of a temporary outbreak of competition between the canal and the London and North Western Railway (L&NWR); it was back up to sixteen pence by 1853.

When a celebratory train ran over the line at the beginning of July 1849, a reporter for the Manchester Courier observed that most stations had permanent buildings and "at Knott Mill and Oxford-street temporary stations will in the meantime be erected." When the line opened for passenger traffic a fortnight later, the Courier reported the station at Knott Mill had opened with temporary wooden buildings. The booking office was at street level; from it, "narrow, steep, troublesome steps, enough to tire anyone but athletes" led to the platforms. The station proved, according to its critics, to be "inconvenient of approach, ugly in appearance and with platform, booking office and waiting-room accommodation much cramped" but accessibility was the biggest issue: for the aged, the invalid or children it was "a most difficult not to say dangerous task to climb the steep flights of steps to the platforms."

The area was also the site of the annual Easter-tide Knott Mill Fair, a decades-old event which, until its abolition in 1876, hosted acts such as Pablo Fanque's Circus Royal and George Wombwell's Menagerie.

In 1860, special trains laid on in connection with the fair by both the L&NWR and the Manchester, Sheffield and Lincolnshire Railway (MS&LR), the joint owners of the MSJAR were not advertised as running to Knott Mill station; the LNWR excursion ran to Ordsall Lane, the MS&L excursion to London Road (now Piccadilly station).)

If the station was originally named Knot Mill and Deansgate by the MSJAR, from its opening onwards it was known simply as Knott Mill (or Knot Mill) to the Manchester papers and, by 1860, the railway was following suit in its advertisements. In 1864, the MS&LR gave the required notice of a bill to be brought forward in the next session of Parliament for widening part of the MSJAR "from or near Knott Mill station to Old Trafford station"; however, in the same year, the accident return for an accident at Old Trafford noted that the train involved had stopped at "Knot Mill and left that station..."

Following the widening and improvement of the southern portion of Deansgate, a correspondent to the Manchester Courier suggested in 1880 that the station be renamed Deansgate: "Very few lady passengers who have shopping to do in Deansgate make use of the Knot Mill station. If they are aware of its nearness, perhaps they are waiting for the station and its approaches to be improved" A public meeting in October 1884 complained that Knott Mill station was altogether inadequate for the newly improved district; the MSJAR was therefore alleged to be in breach of the requirement to provide sufficient station accommodation: the Improvement Committee of Manchester Corporation was called upon to exert pressure on the MSJAR.

A deputation from the Improvement Committee duly met directors of the railway to urge them to improve the "dingy" and "long-neglected" station. Improvement plans were drawn up but an impasse was reached; the MSJAR's joint owners (the L&NWR and the MS&LR) disagreed on how much they should spend on improvement and Manchester Corporation were unhappy with any narrowing of adjacent streets to accommodate an enlarged station. Not until 1892 was a plan devised that was acceptable to all of the interested parties. Negotiations to purchase the required land were protracted, with Manchester Corporation eventually offering to exercise its powers of compulsory purchase to assist the railway, but the work finally went out for tender in January 1895. Work started in March 1895. By June 1895, a temporary entrance from Gaythorn Street had to be used and the previous entrance from Deansgate was closed; it was completed in September 1896; the latter year appears (in a shield) as part of the decorative stonework over the entrance. The station name is given there as simply Knott Mill Station.

The station is now a Grade II listed building. Its battlemented architectural feature, visible at its corner, is intended to mirror similar features in the nearby viaducts, all of which in turn incorporated the design in recognition of the Roman fort that once stood in the Castlefield area.

The station became Knott Mill and Deansgate for railway purposes in around 1900; to the local press, it remained Knott Mill station. It was renamed Deansgate on 3 May 1971. It is sometimes known as Manchester Deansgate and on many station information boards it is Deansgate G-Mex.

The station name Deansgate was formerly used for the Great Northern Railway goods station serving the Great Northern Warehouse next to Manchester Central railway station. This is now a Grade II* listed, as the Deansgate Goods Station building.

== Services ==
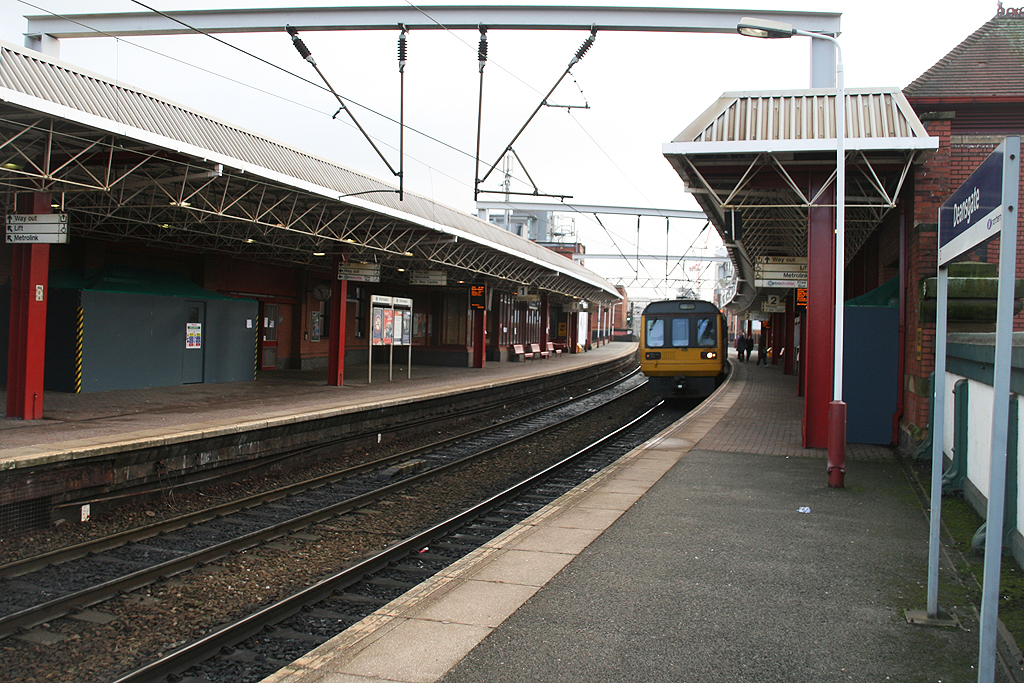
Platform 2 in 2011

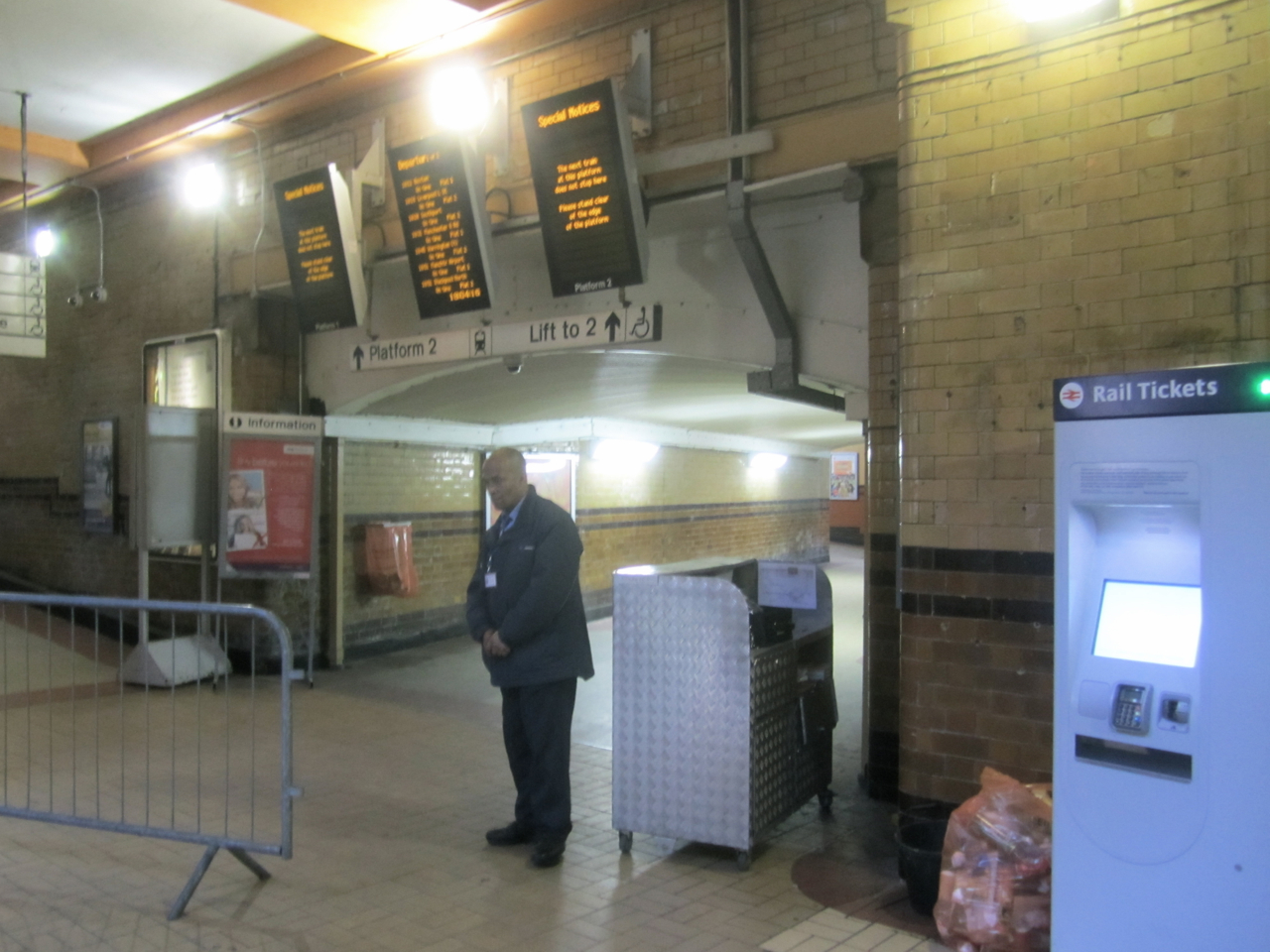
Station concourse

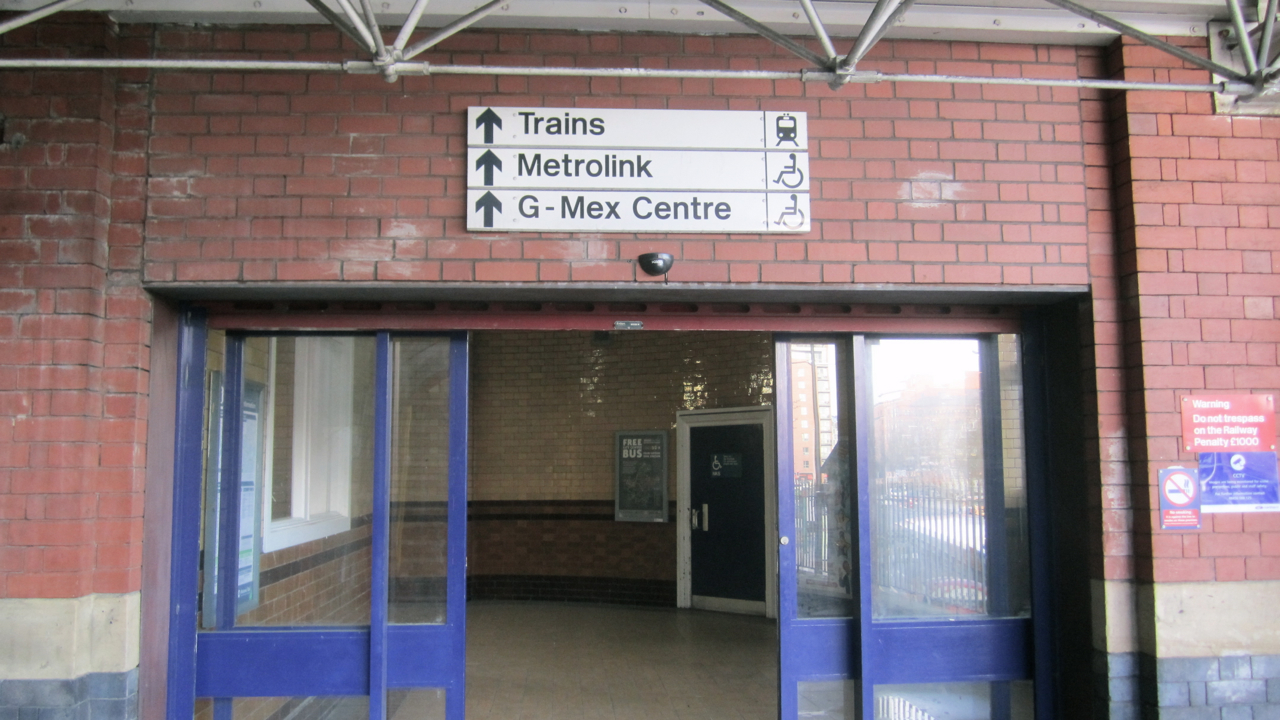
Entrance from Whitworth St. West

All services at this station are operated by Northern. The typical off-peak service pattern is:

- 1tph to Lancaster, including
  - 11tpd continuing to Barrow-in-Furness
  - 4tpd continuing to Windermere
- 2tph to Blackpool North
- 1tph to Southport via Bolton
- 1tph to Liverpool Lime Street via Newton-le-Willows
- 1tph to Liverpool Lime Street via Warrington Central
- 2tph to Manchester Oxford Road
- 4tph to Manchester Airport

All eastbound trains call at Manchester Oxford Road; those that continue to Manchester Airport also call at Manchester Piccadilly.

Preceding station	National Rail	Following station
Urmston	Northern Trains Liverpool to Manchester via Warrington Central	Manchester Oxford Road
Trafford Park	Northern Trains Liverpool to Manchester via Warrington Central	Manchester Oxford Road
Bolton	Northern Trains Barrow-in-Furness/Windermere to Manchester Airport	Manchester Oxford Road
Salford Crescent	Northern Trains Blackpool North to Manchester Airport	Manchester Oxford Road
Salford Crescent	Northern Trains Manchester to Southport	Manchester Oxford Road
Eccles	Northern Trains Liverpool Lime Street to Manchester Airport	Manchester Oxford Road
	Disused railways	
Cornbrook; 1856–65; Line and station closed	Manchester, South Junction and Altrincham Railway	Manchester Oxford Road; Line and station open
Old Trafford; 1849–56, 1865–1991; Line closed, station open	Manchester, South Junction and Altrincham Railway	Manchester Oxford Road; Line and station open

== See also ==
- Listed buildings in Manchester-M3
