= Market Street tram stop =

Manchester Metrolink tram stop

Market Street
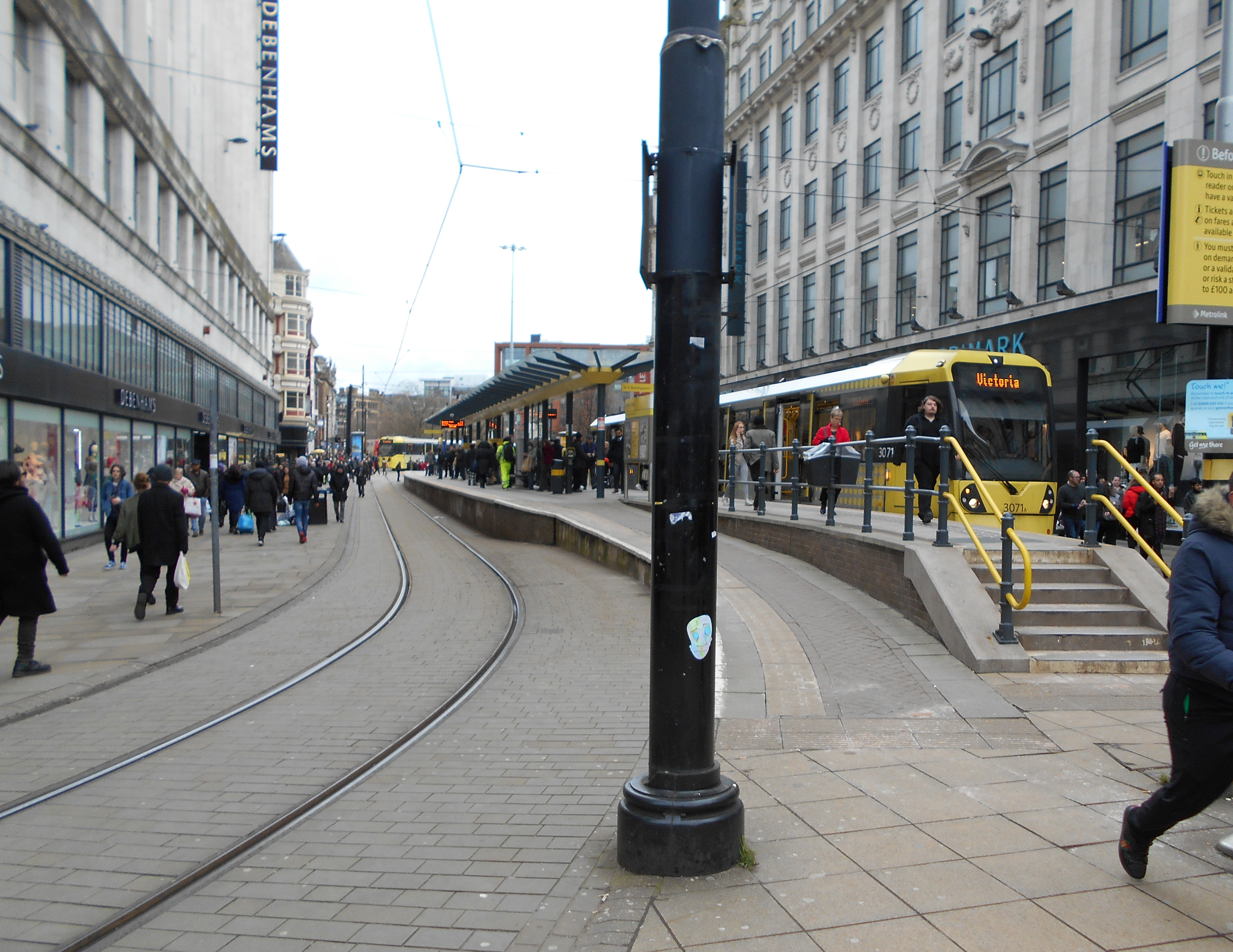
- Market Street tram stop from the north in February 2018, after refurbishment

General information
- Location: Manchester city centre, Manchester; United Kingdom
- Coordinates: 53.4819°N 2.2388°W
- Grid reference: SJ842983
- System: Manchester Metrolink station
- Line: First City Crossing
- Platforms: 2 (island)

Other information
- Fare zone: 1

History
- Opened: 27 April 1992; Northbound trams only 10 August 1998; Both directions
- Original company: Manchester Metrolink
Route map
Location

Market Street is a tram stop in Zone 1 of Greater Manchester's Metrolink light rail system. It is located on Market Street, in Manchester city centre, England. It opened on 27 April 1992 as part of Phase 1 of Metrolink's expansion.

Originally the stop in Market Street had one platform and handled only northbound trams to Bury, with High Street tram stop a short distance away handling southbound trams from Bury. When Market Street was pedestrianised, High Street stop was closed, and Market Street was rebuilt as an island platform to handle trams in both directions. The rebuilt stop opened on 10 August 1998. It was rebuilt once again in 2015 with a new canopy. The stop is one of the most used on the Metrolink network.

== Services ==
Services run every twelve minutes on each route at most operating times.

Preceding station	Manchester Metrolink	Following station
Piccadilly Gardens towards Piccadilly	Piccadilly–Bury	Shudehill towards Bury
St Peter's Square towards Altrincham	Altrincham–Bury (peak only)	Shudehill towards Bury
St Peter's Square towards Manchester Airport	Manchester Airport–Victoria	Shudehill towards Victoria

== Gallery ==
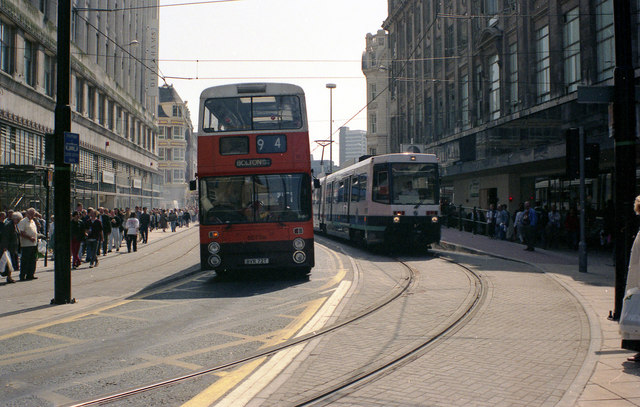
The stop in 1992 in its original configuration as a one way stop.

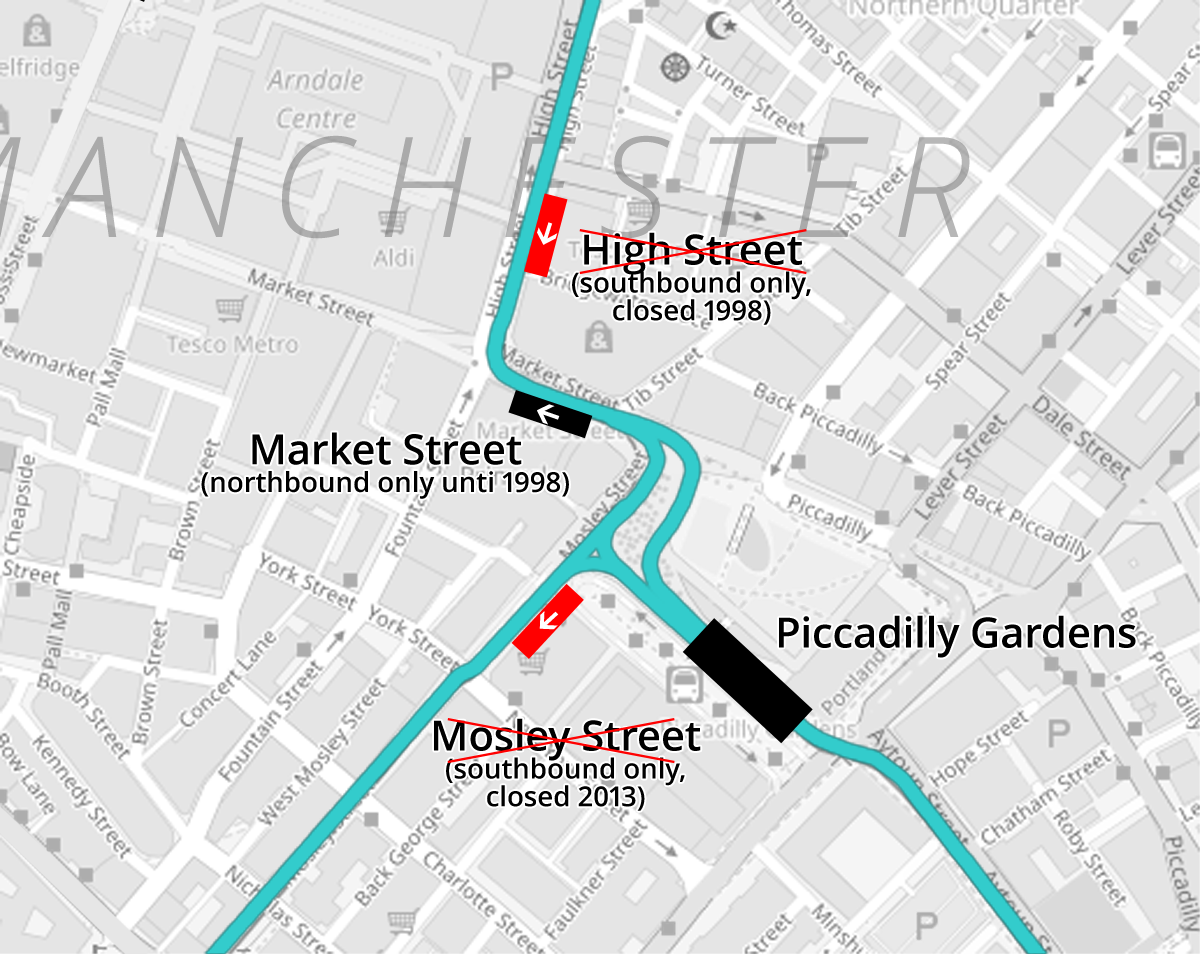
Map of the original layout of Market Street (northbound) and High Street (southbound) tram stops in 1992

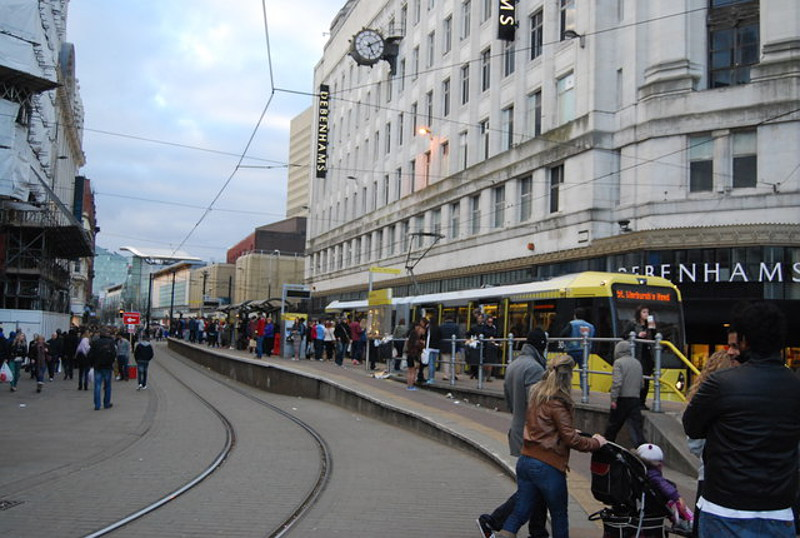
In 2013, seen from the south.

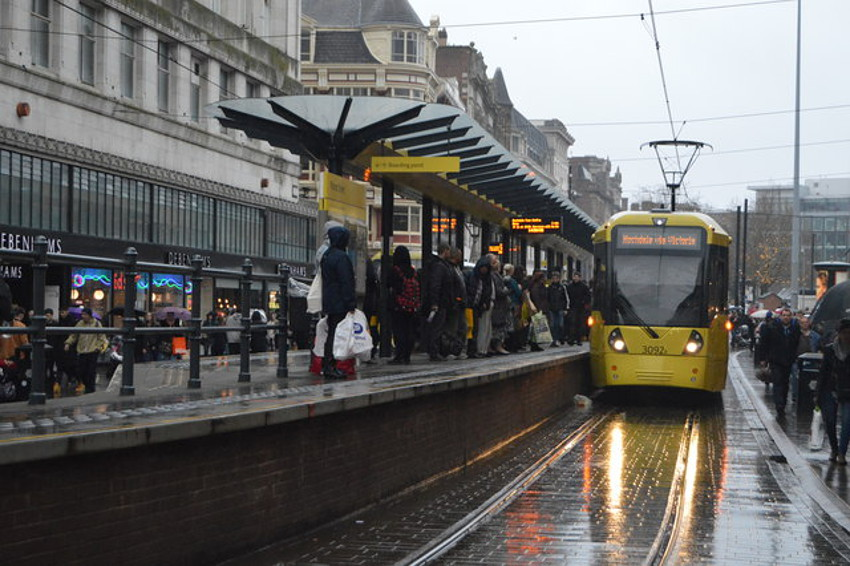
Market Street tram stop in December 2015
