= Piccadilly Gardens tram stop =

Manchester Metrolink tram stop

Piccadilly Gardens
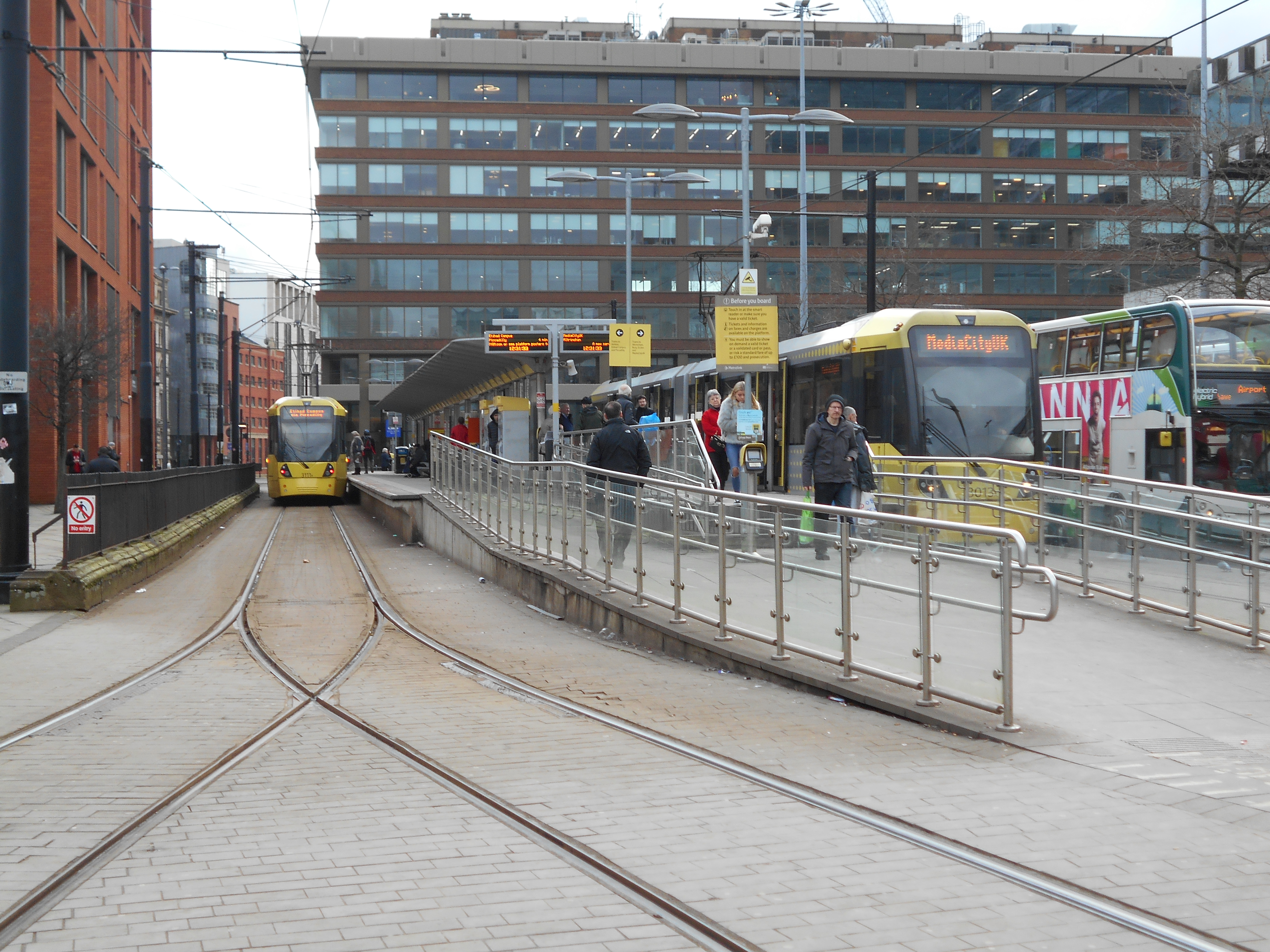
- Piccadilly Gardens tram stop in February 2018

General information
- Location: Piccadilly Gardens, Manchester; England
- Coordinates: 53.4803°N 2.2370°W
- Grid reference: SJ843982
- System: Metrolink station
- Line: Piccadilly spur
- Platforms: 2 (island)

Other information
- Status: In operation
- Fare zone: 1

History
- Opened: 27 April 1992
- Original company: Metrolink
Route map
Location

Piccadilly Gardens is a tram stop in Zone 1 of Greater Manchester's Metrolink light rail system. It is located beside Piccadilly Gardens in Manchester city centre, and serves as a transport hub (integrated with the adjacent Manchester Piccadilly Gardens bus station) and interchange station (which can be used to change between Metrolink lines).

Piccadilly Gardens tram stop opened on 27 April 1992, as part of Metrolink's Phase 1. The station was rebuilt during 2009 with a wider platform and a new canopy, reopening on 2 November 2009. The stop is one of the most used on the Metrolink network.

== History ==
In 1931, a new bus station was opened on Parker Street on the former site of the Manchester Royal Infirmary, providing a central transport interchange for bus passengers. In 1945, adjacent site was landscaped as an ornamental sunken garden and named Piccadilly Gardens.

In 1991, construction work began on a new light rail transport network, Manchester Metrolink. New tram lines were laid along the southern and western sides of Piccadilly Gardens, and a new tram stop constructed alongside the bus station, providing an inter-modal exchange between tram and bus.

== Services ==
Services run every fifteen minutes on each route at most operating times.

Preceding station	Manchester Metrolink	Following station
Market Street towards Bury	Bury–Piccadilly	Piccadilly Terminus
St Peter's Square towards Altrincham	Altrincham–Piccadilly	Piccadilly Terminus
St Peter's Square towards Altrincham	Altrincham–Etihad Campus (evenings and Sundays only)	Piccadilly towards Etihad Campus
St Peter's Square towards MediaCityUK	MediaCityUK–Etihad Campus (peak only)	Piccadilly towards Etihad Campus
St Peter's Square towards Eccles	Eccles–Ashton (peak only)	Piccadilly towards Ashton-under-Lyne
St Peter's Square towards Eccles	Eccles–Ashton via MediaCityUK (off-peak only)	Piccadilly towards Ashton-under-Lyne

== Gallery ==
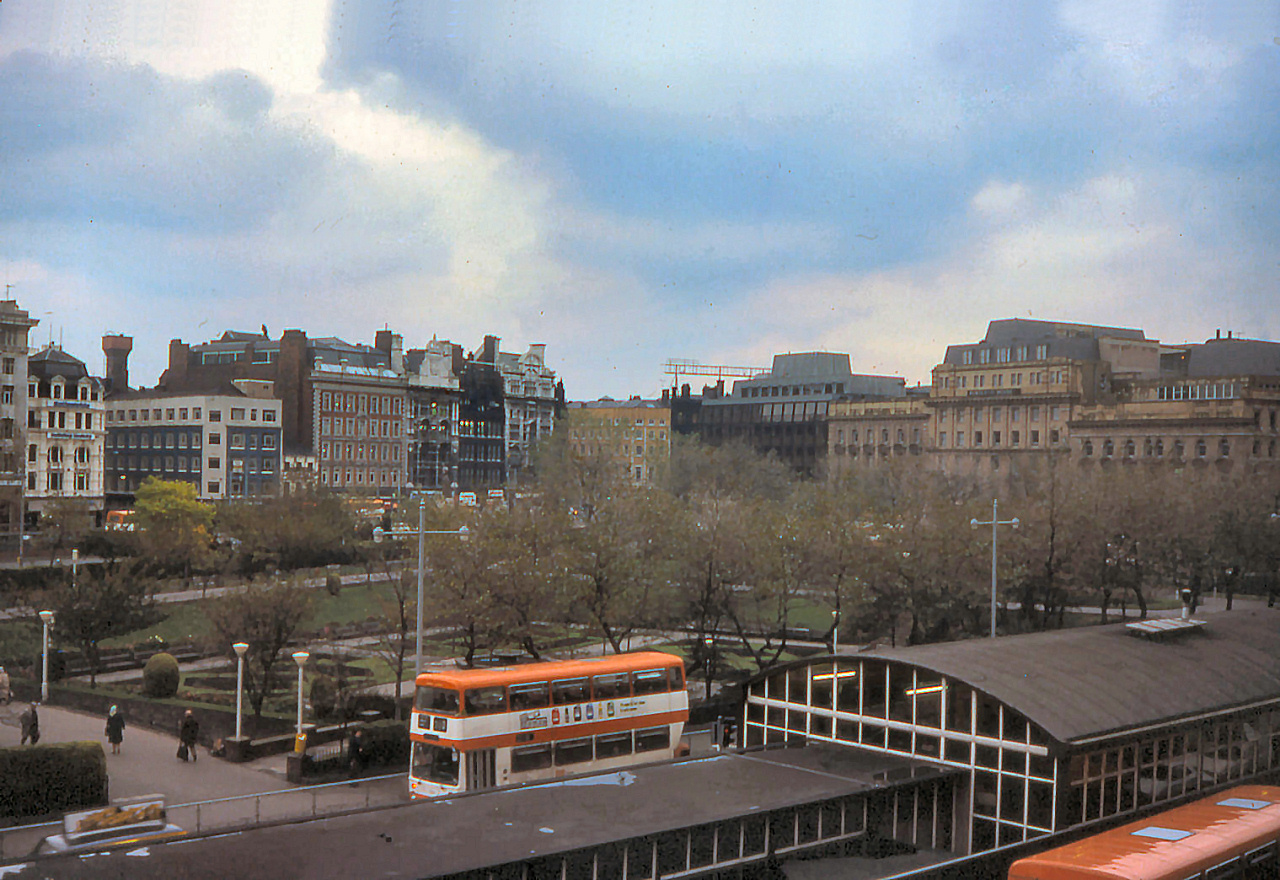
Piccadilly Gardens bus station in 1976

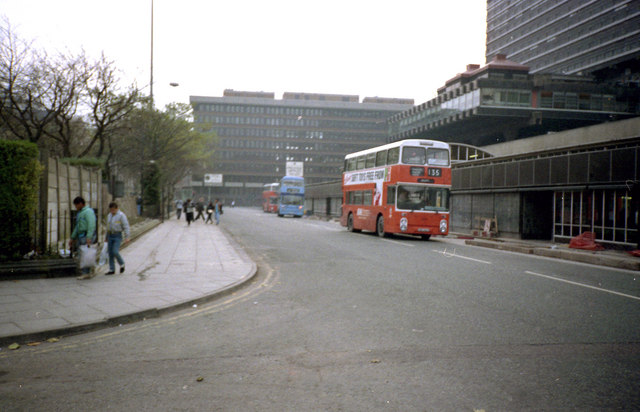
The future site of Piccadilly Gardens tram stop, photographed in 1989

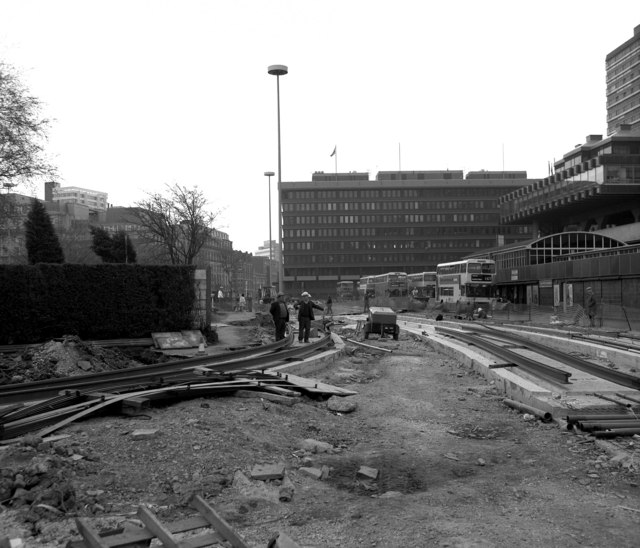
Construction of the Manchester Metrolink lines at Piccadilly Gardens in 1991

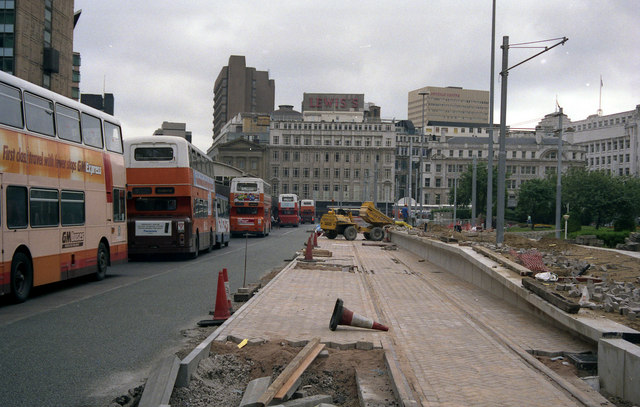
Construction of Piccadilly Gardens Metrolink platforms in 1991

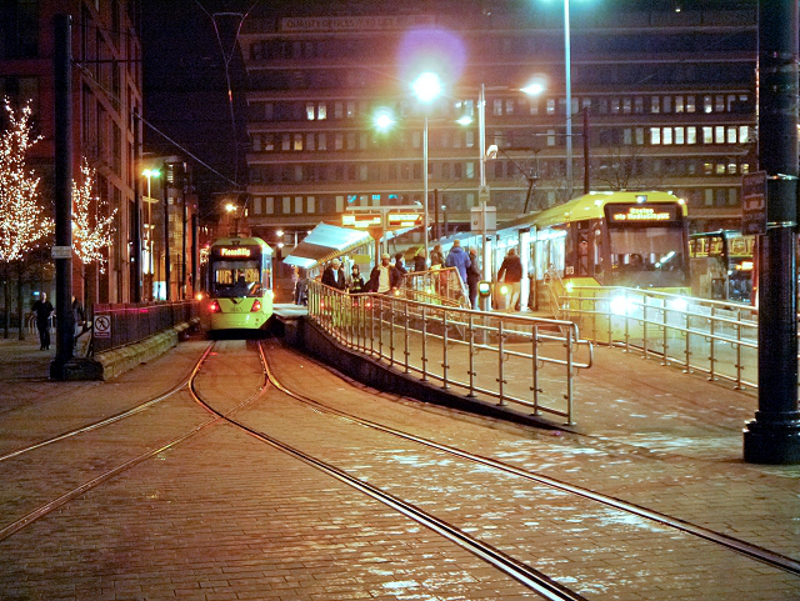
Piccadilly Gardens tram stop in December 2013.

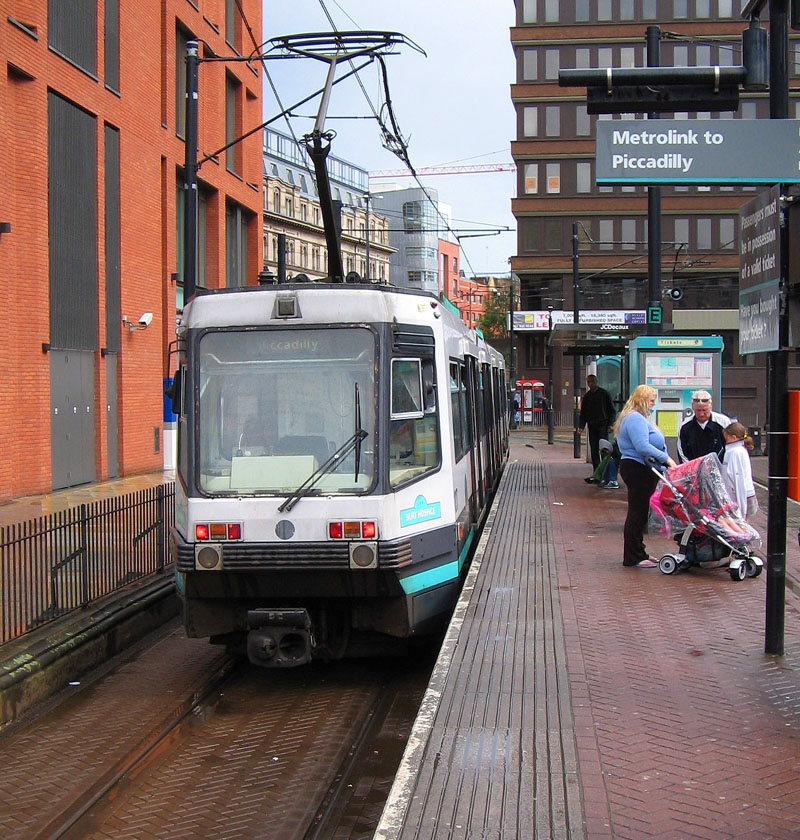
An older T-68 tram at Piccadilly Gardens tram stop in 2005.

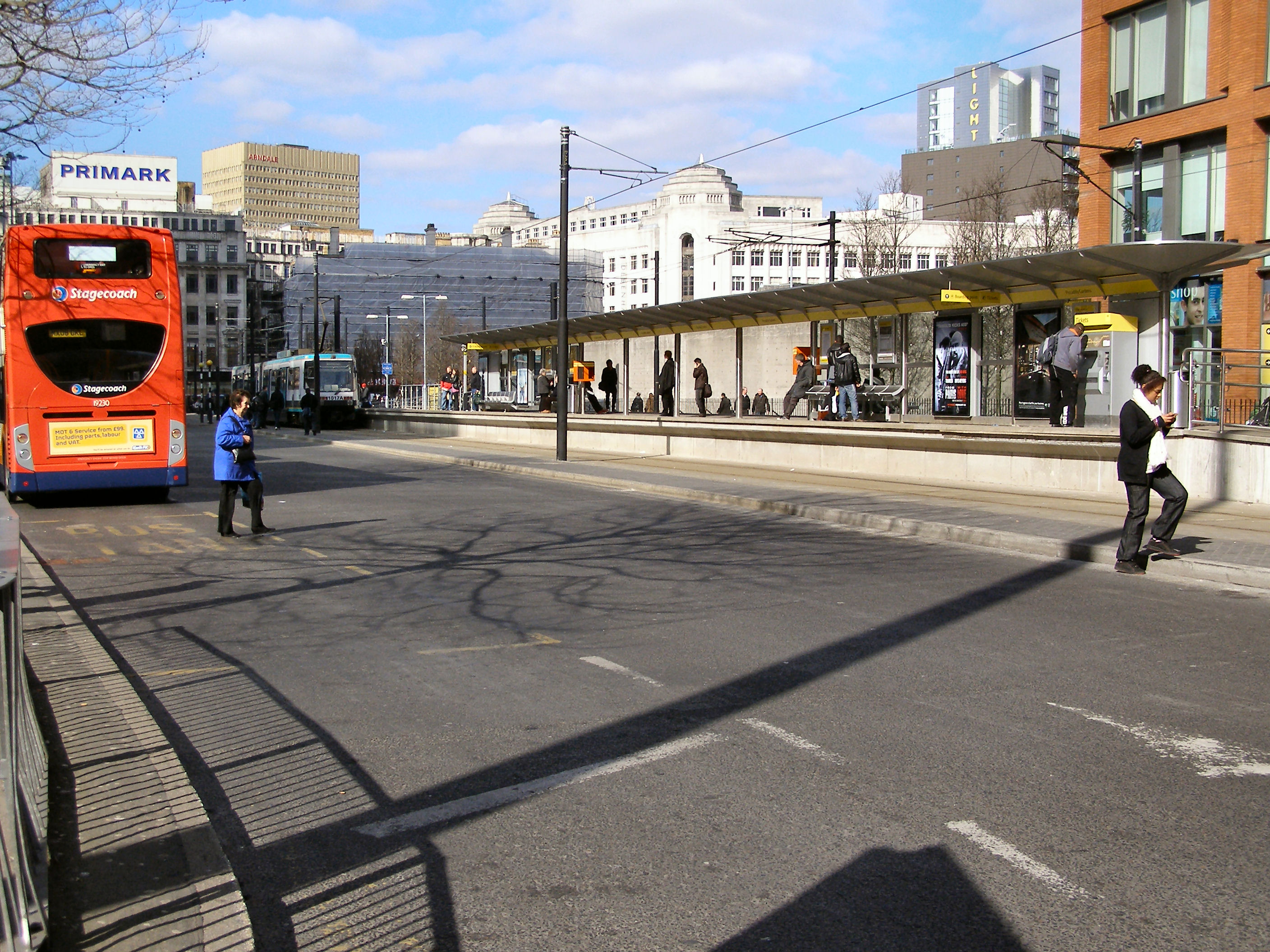
Inter-modal exchange at the bus station

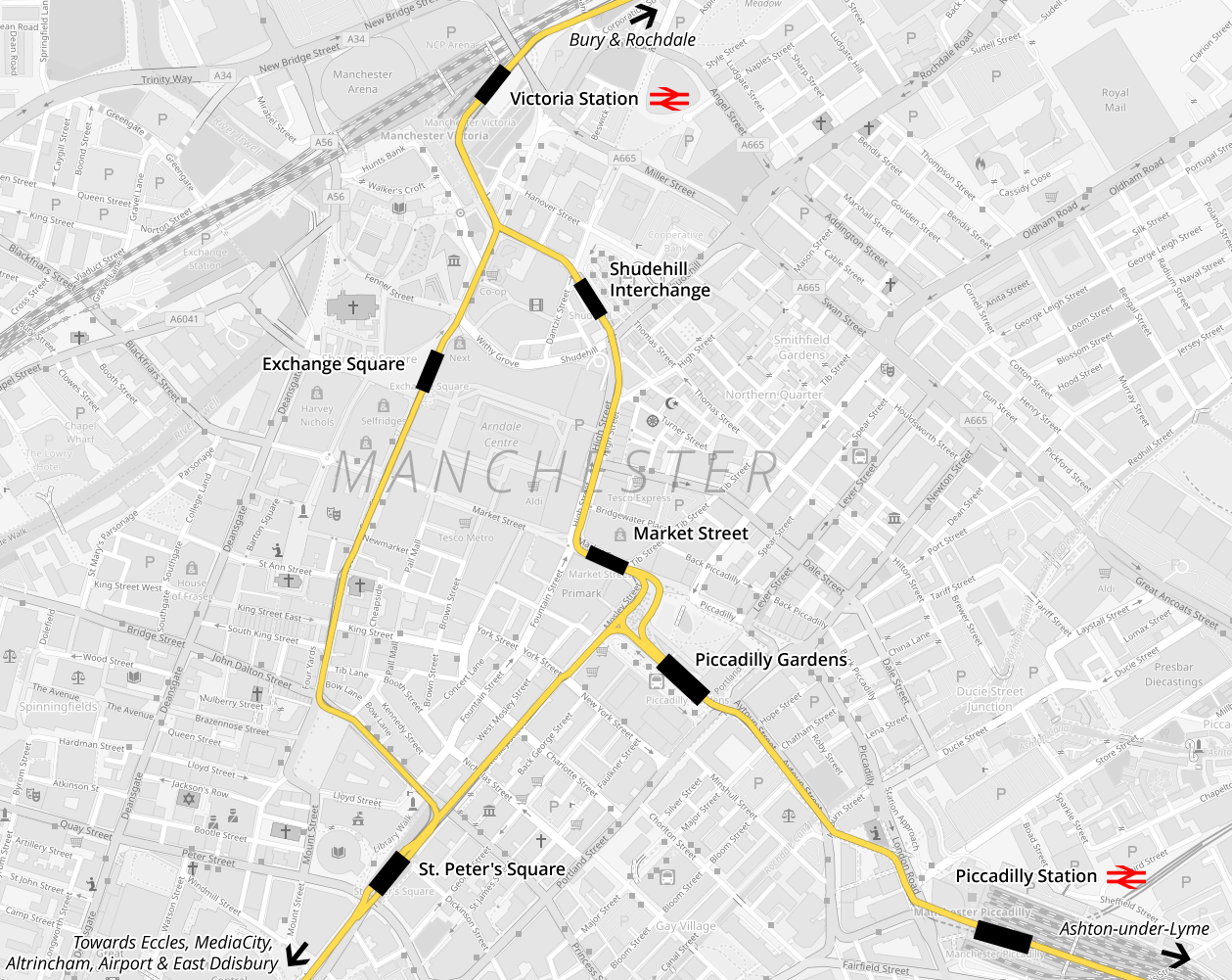
Map of Manchester City Centre Metrolink stops

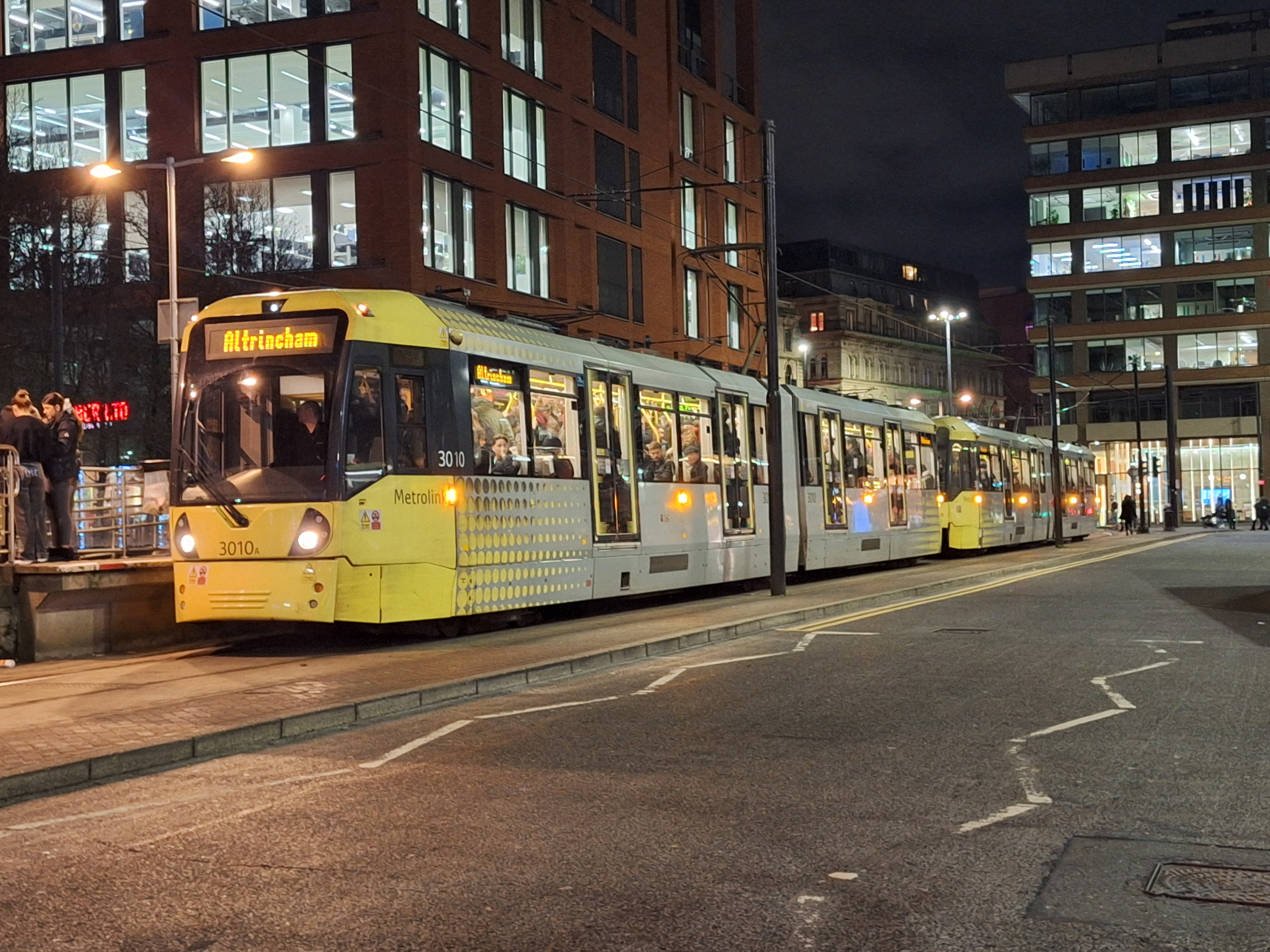
A M5000 twin unit at Piccadilly Gardens tram stop in December 2024
