= St Peter's Square tram stop =

Manchester Metrolink tram stop

St Peter's Square
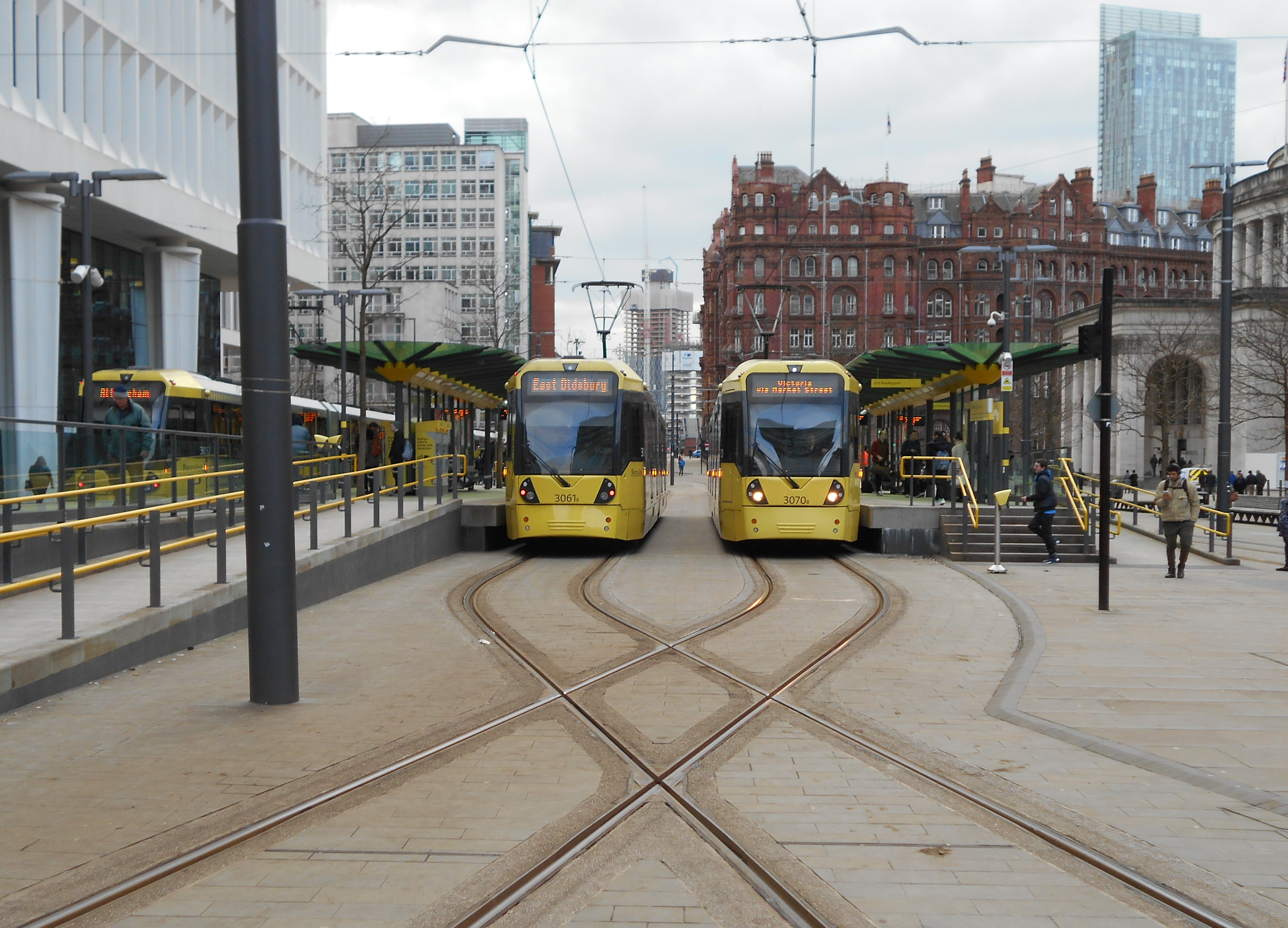

General information
- Location: St Peter's Square, Manchester; England
- Coordinates: 53.4782°N 2.2430°W
- Grid reference: SJ839979
- System: Manchester Metrolink tram stop
- Lines: First City Crossing; Second City Crossing
- Platforms: 4

Other information
- Status: In operation
- Fare zone: 1

History
- Original company: Manchester Metrolink

Key dates
- 27 April 1992: Opened
- 2015-2016: Rebuilt

Passengers
- 2017/18: ▲7.010 million
- 2018/19: ▲8.711 million
- 2019/20: ▼7.480 million
- 2020/21: ▼1.307 million
- 2021/22: ▲4.930 million
Route map
Location

St Peter's Square is a tram stop in St Peter's Square in Manchester city centre, England. It opened on 27 April 1992 and is in Zone 1 of Greater Manchester's Metrolink light rail system.

The stop's platforms were extended in 2009, but later redevelopment in 2015–16 demolished the original two side platforms and replaced them with a twin-island platform layout, which allows for limited cross-platform interchange. The stop is the most used on the Metrolink network.

== History ==
Plans for a rapid transit station in St Peter's Square were made in the 1970s; proposals for the abandoned Picc-Vic tunnel envisaged the construction of an underground station to serve both St Peter's and the neighbouring Albert Square. The early proposals for an on-street light rail system in Manchester revived the idea of a station in the square. St. Peter's Square was one of the original city-centre stops to open when Metrolink started operations in 1992, when it consisted of two side platforms and basic shelters. In common with most newly built Metrolink stops at the time, St. Peter's Square had two-level platforms, meaning only a short section of the platforms offered level boarding.

The stop was demolished and rebuilt with a full length platform and improved passenger facilities in November 2009. When a building called Elisabeth House, which had stood between Dickinson Street and Oxford Street since the 1970s, was demolished for redevelopment in 2011 as One St Peter's Square, architects' plans were entered in a competition, which was modified in 2011 to incorporate proposals to improve the Metrolink station. In March 2012 a shortlist of two submissions was made.

The stop closed after end of service on 25 June 2015 for 14 months to allow for a total redevelopment of St Peter's Square, to incorporate trams on the new Second City Crossing. During the redevelopment works, a reduced service ran through the square on a single track from Nicholas Street to Windmill Street. At the beginning and end of the project, there were two full closures lasting two months, during which no Metrolink services ran through the square.

The project involved a complete re-ordering of St Peter's Square, and the Cenotaph was re-sited to accommodate the expanded tram interchange. The realigned tram tracks were laid over the site of a former church, St Peter's Church, which had been demolished in 1907. To protect the remaining underground burial vaults of the church, concrete slabs were put in place below street level before the tram tracks were laid. The stone cross marking the location of the former church was restored and re-instated close to its original location, in between the tracks.

The tram stop re-opened on 28 August 2016 as a four-platform interchange, comprising two island platforms, one for inbound services and the other for outbound. This offers same-direction cross-platform interchange. The stop was moved slightly north towards Princess Street from that of its old location, which was in front of Manchester Central Library. A number of trees were planted within the structure of the platforms to improve the look and feel of the space.

An artist's impression of light rail in St Peter's Square (1987)

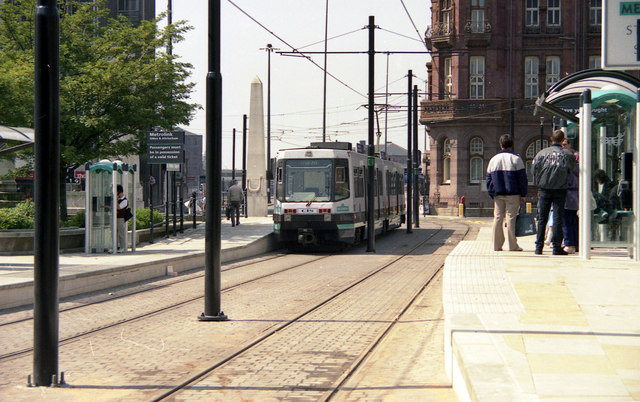
T-68 Tram at the old St Peter's Square tram stop in 1992.

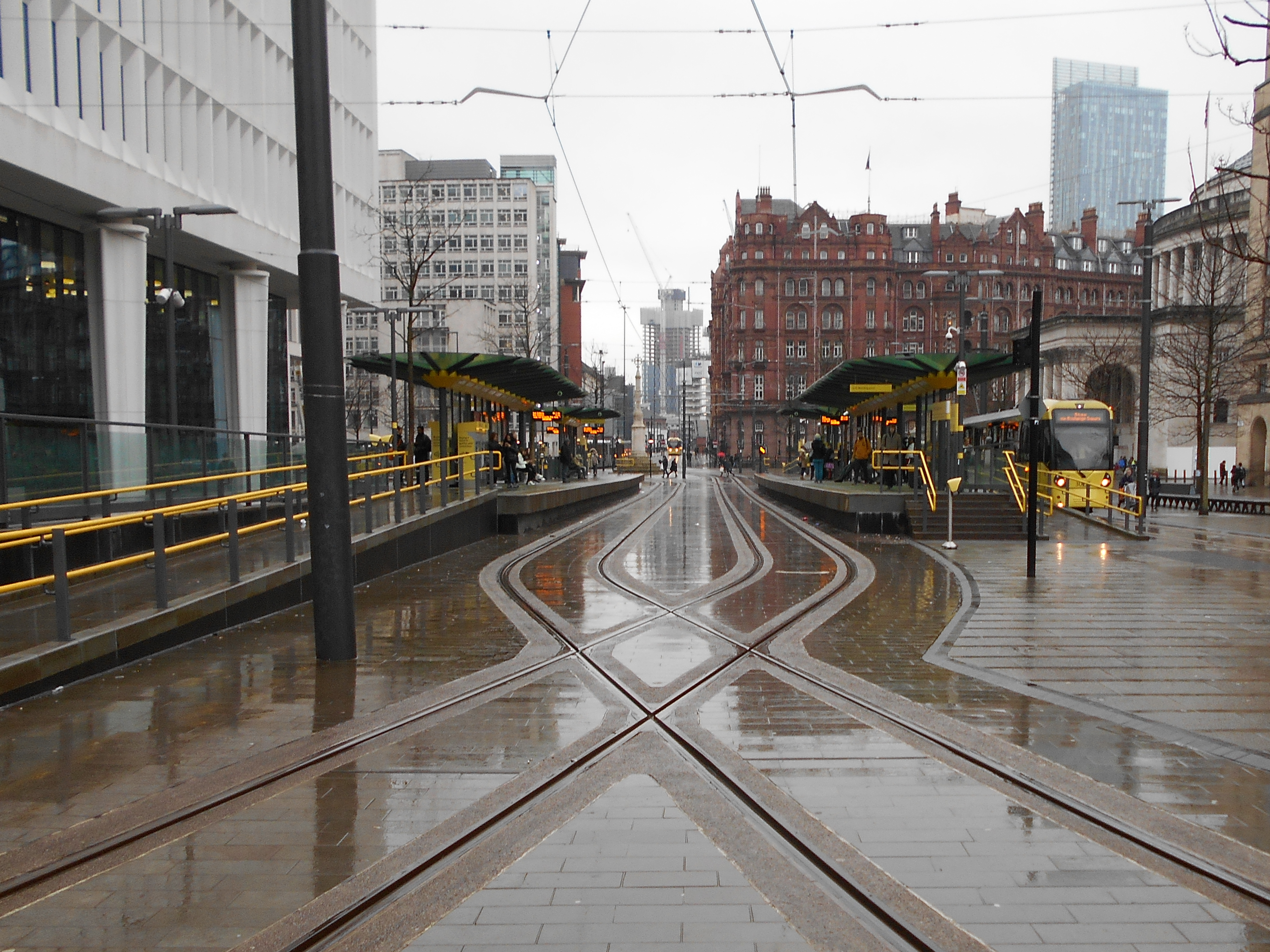
The rebuilt four platform stop, 2018

== Services ==
Services run every 12 minutes on each route.

| Preceding station | Manchester Metrolink | Following station |
|---|---|---|
| Deansgate-Castlefield towards East Didsbury | East Didsbury–Shaw (peak only) | Exchange Square towards Shaw and Crompton |
| Deansgate-Castlefield towards East Didsbury | East Didsbury–Rochdale | Exchange Square towards Rochdale Town Centre |
| Deansgate-Castlefield towards Manchester Airport | Manchester Airport–Victoria | Market Street towards Victoria |
| Deansgate-Castlefield towards Altrincham | Altrincham–Bury (peak only) | Market Street towards Bury |
| Deansgate-Castlefield towards Altrincham | Altrincham–Piccadilly | Piccadilly Gardens towards Piccadilly |
| Deansgate-Castlefield towards Altrincham | Altrincham–Etihad Campus (evenings and Sundays only) | Piccadilly Gardens towards Etihad Campus |
| Deansgate-Castlefield towards Eccles | Eccles–Ashton (peak only) | Piccadilly Gardens towards Ashton-under-Lyne |
| Deansgate-Castlefield towards Eccles | Eccles–Ashton via MediaCityUK (off-peak only) | Piccadilly Gardens towards Ashton-under-Lyne |
