= History of Manchester Metrolink =

History of Manchester's tram network

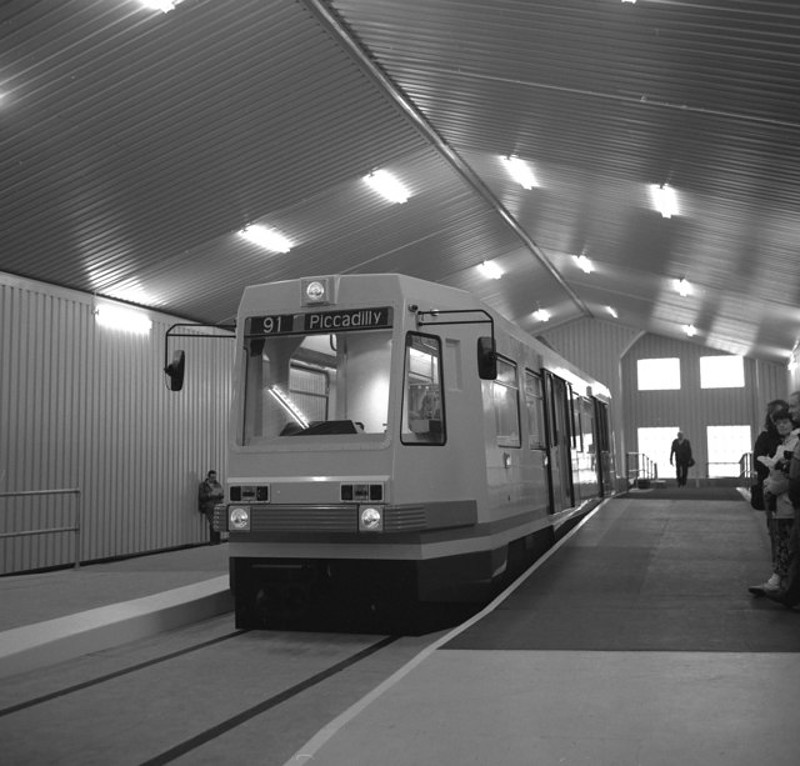
A pre production mock-up of an AnsaldoBreda T-68 Metrolink vehicle on display in 1990

The history of Manchester Metrolink begins with its conception as Greater Manchester's light rail system in 1982 by the Greater Manchester Passenger Transport Executive, and spans its inauguration in 1992 and the successive phases of expansion.

== Background ==
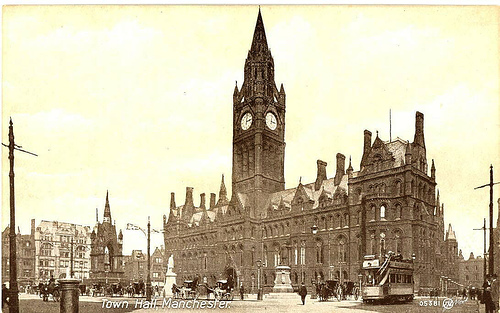
A tram passing Manchester Town Hall (c.1901)

Trams had previously operated on Manchester streets from 1877 to 1949. The original trams of the Manchester Suburban Tramways Company were horse-drawn tram, but from 1901 these were supplanted by electrically powered trams. A network of neighbouring municipal tramway systems such as Bury Corporation Tramways, Rochdale Corporation Tramways and Manchester Corporation Tramways expanded and overlapped across the city. By 1930, Manchester's tram network had grown to 163 miles (262 km) route miles, making it the third largest tram system in the United Kingdom. After World War II, electric trolleybuses and motor buses began to be favoured by local authorities as a cheaper transport alternative, and by 1949 the last Manchester tram line was closed. Trolleybuses were withdrawn from service in 1966.

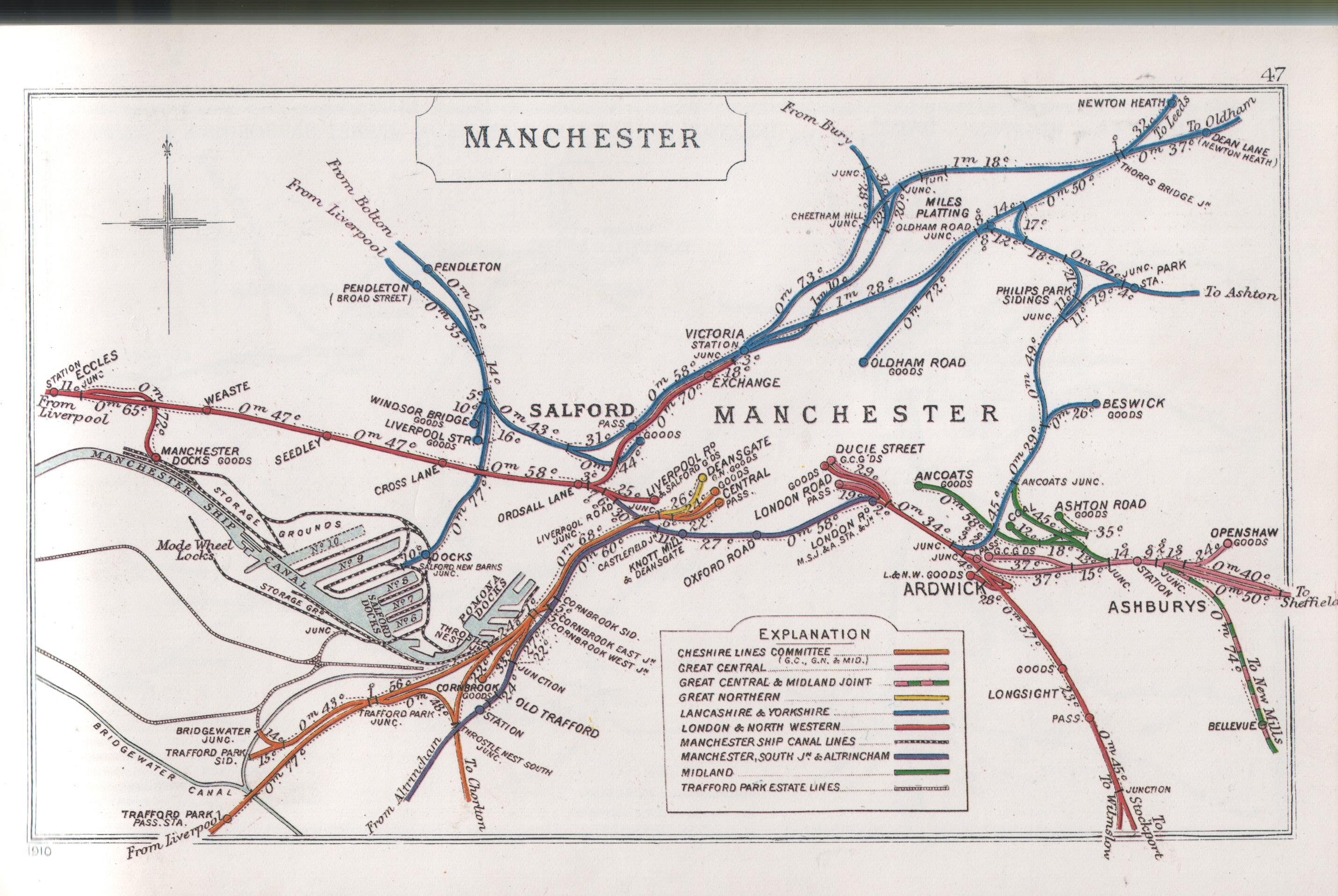
A 1910 map of railways in central Manchester

Manchester's mainline railway network historically suffered from poor north–south connections. The development of the railway network around Manchester in the 19th and 20th centuries had resulted in the location of major railway termini around the periphery of Manchester city centre. The main stations of Manchester Victoria in the north and Manchester London Road (now Manchester Piccadilly) in the south were built in the 1840s, followed by Manchester Central in 1880, all by rival companies using cheaper land on the fringes of the city centre. Unlike central London, which had linked its stations with the London Underground, the stations were not connected, and as a result, a large area of Manchester's central business district was not served by rail transport.

A scheme to develop a light rail system for Greater Manchester was first conceived by Greater Manchester County Council (GMC), the local authority that governed the metropolitan county from 1974 to 1986. The GMC was obliged under its structure plan and the Transport Act 1968 to provide "an integrated and efficient system of public transport". Faced with increasing traffic congestion and a lack of rail links in Manchester city centre, the GMC began to examine light rail as an affordable transport solution.

== Early transit proposals ==
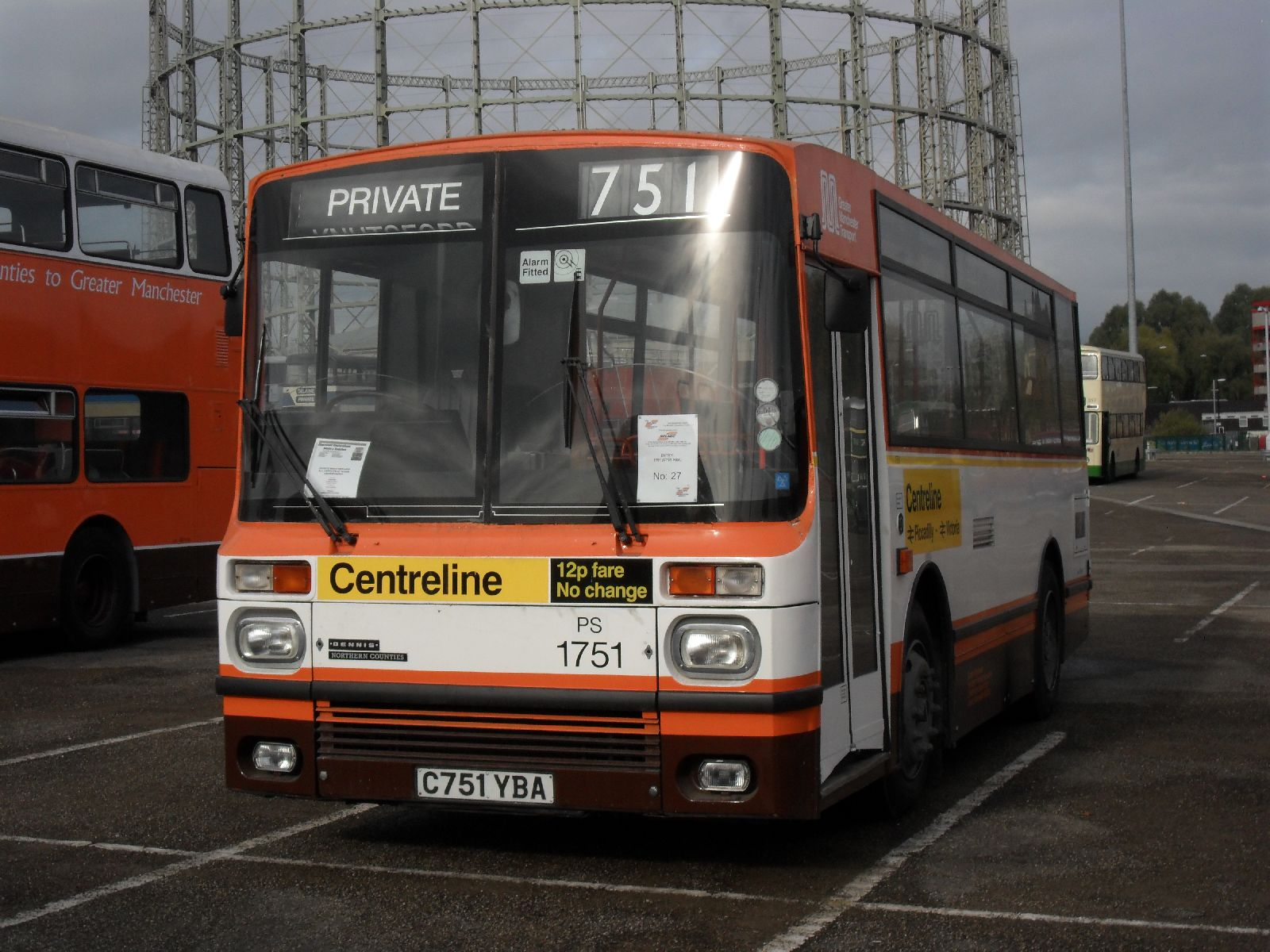
The GMT Centreline bus

As early as 1839, in anticipation of the opening of Victoria and London Road stations, there was a proposal to construct a connecting underground railway tunnel, but this was abandoned on economic grounds. Over the years, a number of other unsuccessful schemes were put forward to connect Manchester's rail termini, including an underground tramway in 1903 and 1914 and an underground railway in 1938.

In the 1960s, central government began to recognise the problems caused by traffic congestion in British towns and cities. While the 1963 Buchanan Report focused mainly on traffic management, the public discussion increasingly turned towards public transport improvement schemes. The Department of the Environment sponsored a number of design studies of new systems of urban public transport.

In 1966, a proposal was explored to construct an above-ground suspended monorail across central Manchester. The £21m plan involved the construction of a 16-mile (26 km) line from Ringway Airport, running north through Wythenshawe, Didsbury and Moss side to Central Station, crossing the city centre via a tunnel from Ancoats to Victoria, and then onwards through Collyhurst and Alkrington to Middleton. Supported by the Ministry of Transport, Manchester Corporation analysed the possibility of investing in the SAFEGE monorail system which had been developed in France, and the possibility of running monorail trains suspended from tracks along the centre of existing roads, above vehicular traffic.

The Manchester Rapid Transit Study, published in 1967 by the City of Manchester and the Ministry of Transport along with British Rail, evaluated several systems in detail, including: SAFEGE, Alweg, Aérotrain and Westinghouse Transit Expressway (Skybus) monorail systems; a "Passenveyor" people mover system; a gondola lift system; guided busways; and more traditional duorail metro systems. The monorail proposals were all eventually abandoned.

In 1971, SELNEC Passenger Transport Executive — the body established in the 1960s to improve public transport for Manchester and its surrounding municipalities – put forward draft proposals for a Picc-Vic tunnel, "a proposed rail route beneath the city centre" forming "the centrepiece of a new electrified railway network for the region". Proponents of the scheme envisaged constructing a 2.75-mile (4.43 km) tunnel under the city centre, linking Piccadilly and Victoria mainline stations. The underground line would have enabled local trains from Alderley Edge and Hazel Grove to cross the city and run on to terminate at Bury or Bolton. Three new intermediate stations were proposed, at Princess Street, Albert Square/St Peter's Square and Market Street. Following local government reorganisation, the subterranean railway project came under the aegis of the newly formed Greater Manchester County Council. Despite investigatory tunnelling under the Manchester Arndale shopping centre, when the GMC presented the project to the British Government in 1974, it was unable to secure the necessary funding. The Picc-Vic Line was abandoned on economic grounds when the County Council dropped the plans in 1977.

SELNEC, now under the administration of the GMC, was re-organised as the Greater Manchester PTE, known as Greater Manchester Transport (GMT). To address the problem of cross-city transfer, GMT introduced a flat-fare shuttle bus service in 1974 called Centreline, which ran high-frequency circular services between Piccadilly and Victoria stations.

== Light rail proposals ==
In 1982, the Greater Manchester Passenger Transport Executive (GMPTE; the successor to SELNEC PTE) concluded that an overground metropolitan light rail system to replace or complement the region's under-used heavy railways was the most economical solution to improving Greater Manchester's public transport network, which suffered from poor integration and outdated infrastructure; a Rail Study Group, composed of officials from British Rail, Greater Manchester County Council and GMPTE formally endorsed the scheme in 1984.

=== 1984 proposals ===
An early artist's impression of the proposed tram system in Market Street in 1984

Abstract proposals based on light rail systems from elsewhere in Europe and from North America , and a draft 62-mile (100 km) network consisting of three lines were presented by the Rail Study Group to the Government of the United Kingdom for funding in 1984. The proposed system was described as a "Light Rapid Transit" (LRT) network, "a cross between a tram and a train". The network was planned to begin operation in 1989 pending approval from the Government, and construction costs were estimated at £42.5 million.

The proposals outlined a network of three lines traversing Greater Manchester, linking converted heavy rail lines with an on-street tramway through Manchester city centre. A fleet of two-car vehicles (known as "supertrams") with a top speed of 80 km/h would run services at a ten-minute frequency.

The lines proposed were:

1984 proposals
Line A: Altrincham – Hadfield/Glossop	Line B: Bury – Rose Hill/Marple	Line C: Rochdale – East Didsbury
connecting the Manchester, South Junction and Altrincham Railway to the Glossop Line	connecting the Bury-Manchester line to part of the Hope Valley Line	connecting the Oldham Loop Line to the re-opened Manchester South District Line

Obtaining Government grants towards development was not easy and subject to certain criteria, and it was proposed to build the system in phases, beginning with the Altrincham and Bury lines, and the city centre track as far as Piccadilly.

=== 1987 proposals ===
An artist's impression of Metrolink operating in St Peter's Square (1987)

In 1987, when powers and funding had been secured for Phase 1 of the network to go ahead, the brand name Metrolink was first introduced.

Around this time, proposals were put forward by GMPTE for further extensions to the network; in addition to the Bury/Altrincham lines and city centre tracks already confirmed, it was envisaged that the network be extended with lines along the Manchester Ship Canal in Salford and Trafford. Station names vary from the 1984 proposals, for instance with the renaming of Central tram stop to G-Mex, and the addition of Cornbrook. A spur into Rochdale town centre was also proposed.

1987 proposals
Altrincham – Hadfield/Glossop	Bury – Marple/Rose Hill	Rochdale Bus Station – East Didsbury	Broadway/Dumplington – Piccadilly Gardens
As the 1984 proposals	Bury Line/Hope Valley Line, as the 1984 proposals	Oldham Loop Line/Manchester South District Line – as the 1984 proposals, with an extension from Rochdale to Wet Rake and the bus station	a new line to Salford Quays

Of these proposals, parts have survived as extension plans: the lines to Rochdale and East Didsbury formed part of the Phase 3; the Eccles Line is a modified version of the proposed extension into Salford Quays. The proposal to convert the Marple/Rose Hill and Hadfield/Glossop lines to Metrolink running was abandoned, and does not feature in the current Phase 3 expansion plans. The Greater Manchester Passenger Transport Authority did, however, commission in 2004 a feasibility study into converting the Marple line for tram-train operation; and in this revised form it remains on the "reserve list" of proposals for future Metrolink expansion, and was proposed to the Department for Transport in 2008 as a candidate for the national tram-train pilot.

=== Project Light Rail ===
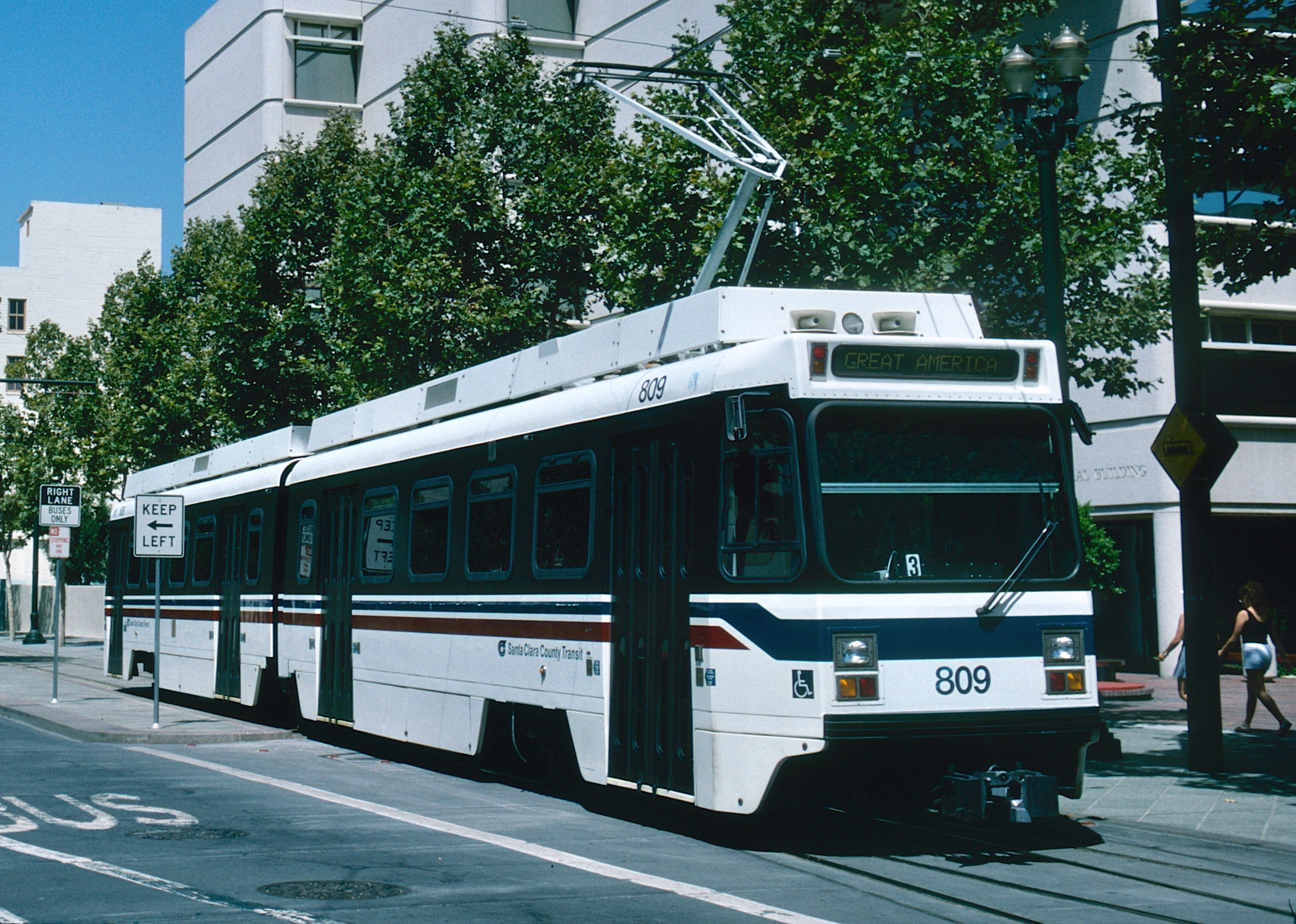
A Santa Clara Valley Transportation Authority LRV in San Jose, California

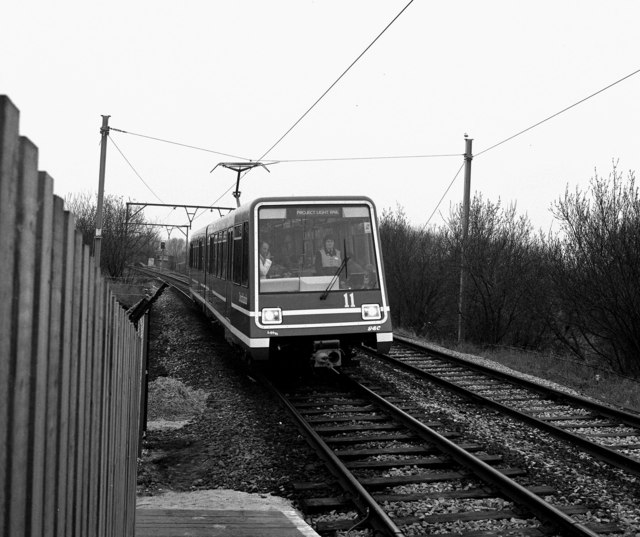
DLR P86 under demonstration in Manchester in 1987

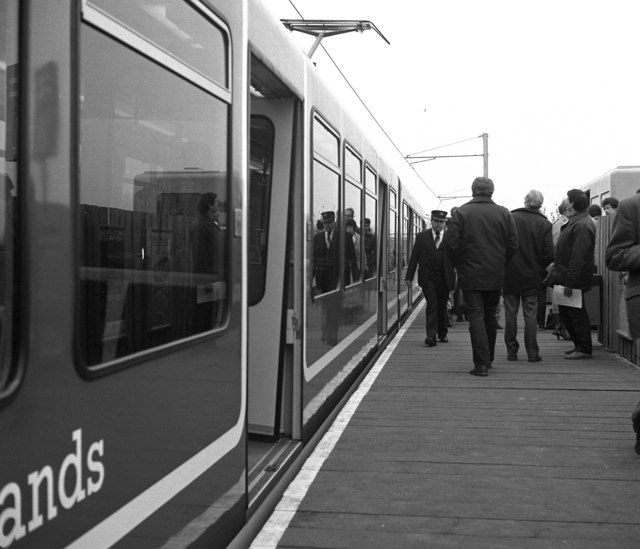
DLR P86 at Debdale Park station

British Rail Engineering Limited (BREL) began researching developments in light rail technology around the world, and in 1986 identified a light rail vehicle designed by the Urban Transportation Development Corporation in Canada for the Santa Clara Valley Transportation Authority (UTDC) in California, USA, as an example of the type of LRV that could run in British cities. BREL planned to organise a live demonstration by shipping a UTDC vehicle which had been on display at the 1986 World Expo in Vancouver. Manchester was selected as the preferred venue for the demonstration as the city had the most developed light rail proposals, but negotiations to loan the vehicle fell through and the event was postponed until spring 1987.

The event that eventually took place in Manchester, billed as Project Light Rail, was jointly staged by GMPTE, British Rail, BREL, GEC Alsthom, Balfour Beatty and Fairclough Civil Engineering. It was the first major public relations event for GMPTE to promote the light rail scheme for Manchester, and to demonstrate the proposed system the organisers looked instead to a new light rail system that was about to open later that year in London, the Docklands Light Railway (DLR). The public demonstration used an operational DLR train, DLR P86 number 11, which was on loan from GEC Transportation Projects. The train had been shipped over to Britain from the manufacturer, Linke-Hofmann-Busch, in Salzgitter, Germany, prior to its introduction onto the DLR system in London.

The event was formally opened by Minister of State for Transport David Mitchell, on 10 March 1987 and public demonstrations took place over two weekends (14/15 and 20/21/22) in March 1987 on a stretch of freight-only railway track, the Fallowfield Loop line. A number of locations had been considered, but the Fallowfield line was chosen because it still had track in place but was not a major passenger route. Originally the organisers had planned to use the disused Reddish depot but instead they decided to construct a temporary station on the site of the former Hyde Road railway station goods yard, adjacent to Debdale Park in the Gorton area of Manchester. The station, named Debdale Park, consisted of a single timber platform. The test track was closed to normal heavy rail traffic on demonstration days, and at night the DLR train was stationed in a siding and the line was re-opened to freight trains. An exhibition also exhibited examples of street track, overhead line and platform facilities.

Tickets were sold for the event at 50p (25p for children) and a free shuttle bus was provided from Piccadilly station. Visitors were given a short ride on the DLR vehicle along a 1.6-kilometre (0.99 mi) stretch of track, from just north of the Hyde Road junction to just south of the closed Reddish depot. The DLR train was specially fitted with a pantograph and powered by overhead line, and was driven manually rather than in automatic mode, which was to be normal practice when in operation on the Docklands system. New 750 v DC overhead line equipment was also erected, using masts designed by Balfour Beatty for the Tuen Mun Light Rail in Hong Kong.

After the public event, Debdale Park station was dismantled and the timber platform was used to build the new Hag Fold railway station near Wigan; and the electric overhead line equipment was taken down and re-used at the Heaton Park Tramway on the lakeside extension. The demonstration train DLR Number 11 was transported to London where it was put into operation on the Docklands Light Railway.

A mock-up prototype version of an AnsaldoBreda T-68 vehicle was put on public display while the Metrolink system was under construction in 1990.

=== Approval ===
Funding was granted by HM Treasury with the strict condition that the system be constructed in phases. Additional taxpayer funding came from the European Regional Development Fund and bank lending. Parliamentary authority to proceed with Phase 1 was obtained with two Acts of Parliament – the Greater Manchester (Light Rapid Transit System) Act 1988 and Greater Manchester (Light Rapid Transit System) (No. 2) Act 1988.

== Delivery ==
=== Phase 1: Bury, Altrincham and Manchester city centre ===
Phase 1 involved the conversion of the Bury Line (Bury to Victoria) and Manchester, South Junction and Altrincham Railway (Altrincham to Piccadilly) heavy rail lines, to light rail, to be linked together by the creation of a street-level tramway through Manchester city centre, including a branch to Piccadilly, to unite the lines as a single 19.2-mile (30.9 km) network, These lines were chosen for Phase 1 because the two heavy rail lines were primarily used for commuting to central Manchester, and would improve north – south links and access to the city centre.

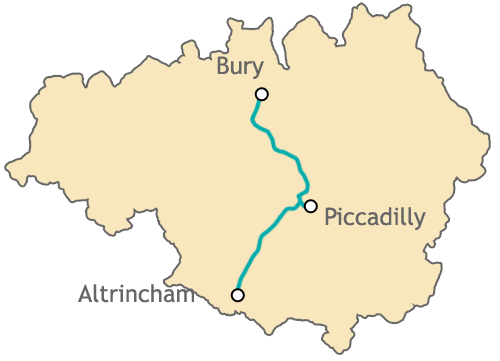
Metrolink after Phase 1 (1992)

On 27 September 1989, following a two-stage tender exercise, the Greater Manchester Passenger Transport Authority awarded a contract to the GMA Group (a consortium composed of Amec, GM Buses, John Mowlem & Company and a General Electric Company subsidiary) who formed Greater Manchester Metro Limited to design, build, operate and maintain Phase 1 of Metrolink. The contract was approved by Michael Portillo on behalf of the Department for Transport on 24 October 1989, and formally signed on 6 June 1990.

The Bury Line was closed in stages between 13 July 1991 and 17 August 1991, after which the 1200V DC third rail electrified line was adapted for a 750 V DC overhead line operation. The overhead structures and wiring of the Altrincham Line were adapted for light rail. As well as upgrades to signalling and stations on the network, a combined headquarters, depot and control centre was built at Cheetham Hill on Queens Road, north of Victoria station, at a cost of £8 million (£18,400,000 as of 2025). In Manchester city centre, a three-way street tramway – built with network expansion in mind, was designed to link Victoria and Piccadilly stations, as well as integrating the Bury and Altrincham Lines into a single network. It comprised a 1.9-mile (3.1 km) street-running route from Victoria, via Market Street to G-Mex (now known as Deansgate-Castlefield) where it joins the line to Altrincham: This is now known as the first city crossing (1CC). Also a 0.4-mile (0.64 km) branch to Piccadilly, which diverges at a three-way junction (known as a 'delta junction') at Piccadilly Gardens.

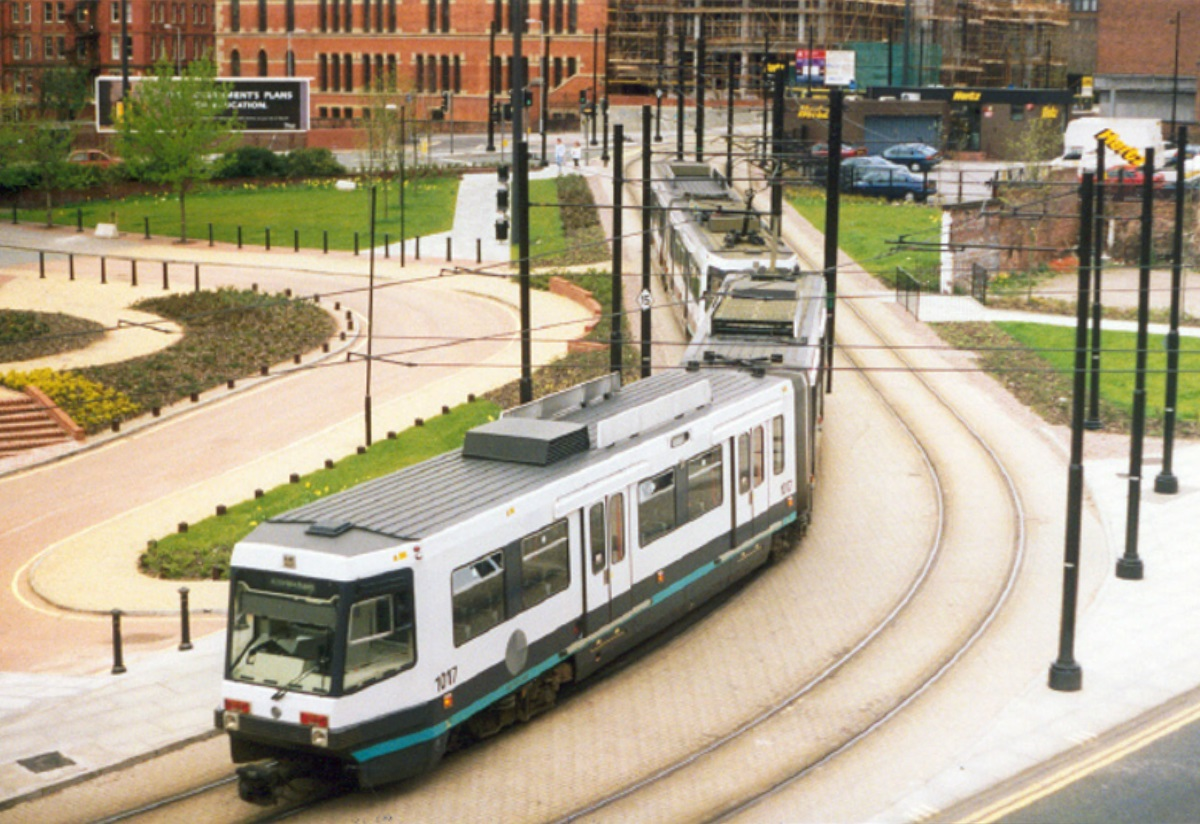
Two AnsaldoBreda T-68 trams near Manchester Piccadilly station in 1994. This was part of the original system opened as part of Phase 1.

Initially projected to open in September 1991, then promised for 21 February 1992, Metrolink began operation on 6 April 1992 with a service between Victoria and Bury. The network was expanded beyond Victoria to G-Mex tram stop on 27 April 1992; then expanded through to Altrincham on 15 June 1992, the branch to Piccadilly station was last to open on 20 July 1992. The completion of Phase 1 enabled use of all 26 AnsaldoBreda T-68 vehicles acquired for the operation. Queen Elizabeth II declared Metrolink open at a ceremony in Manchester on 17 July 1992, adding that Metrolink would improve communication between northern and southern Greater Manchester.

Then costing £145 million (£320,000,000 as of 2025) Phase 1 was expected to carry 10 million passengers per year, but surpassed this figure by the 1993/94 fiscal year, and every year thereafter. By 2003, Phase 1 was deemed a "long-term success" by GMPTE, and, with overcrowding at peak times, carried more than 15 million passengers per year. Around 7.5 million passengers a year had used the previous heavy rail services to Bury and Altrincham which Metrolink replaced.

=== Phase 2: Salford Quays, Eccles ===
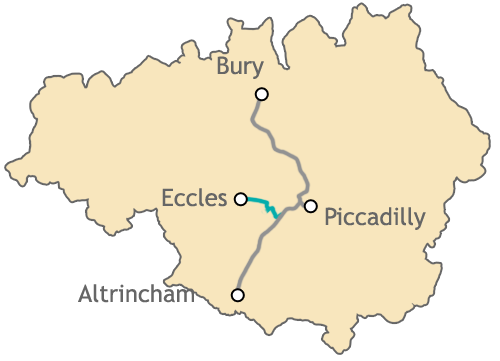
Metrolink after Phase 2 (1999–2000)

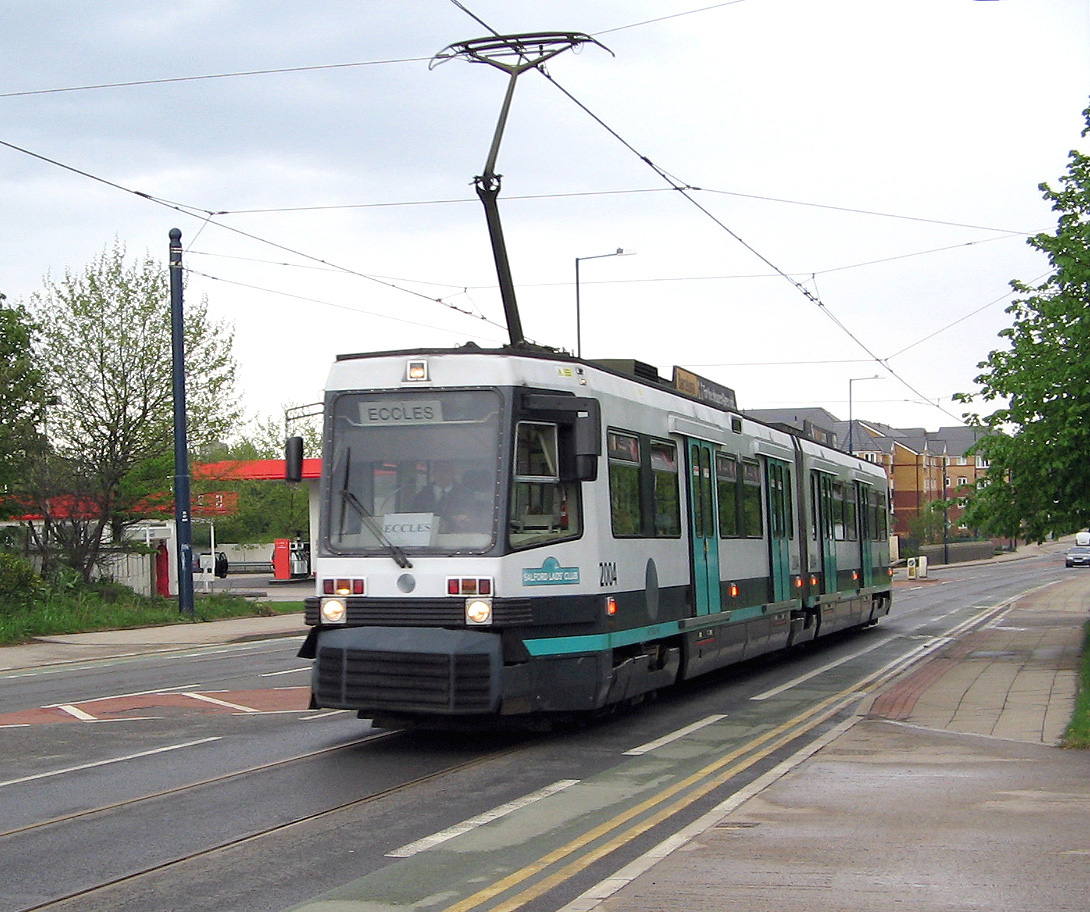
An AnsaldoBreda T-68A vehicle, street running in Eccles specially acquired for the new Eccles Line, opened in 1999 as part of Phase 2.

During the 1990s, Salford Quays became a business district specifically redeveloped for commerce, leisure, culture and tourism. As it had poor public transport integration and no rail provision, it was earmarked for a potential Metrolink line as early as 1986 and legal authority to construct the line through the Quays was acquired in 1990. In autumn 1995 a 4-mile (6.4 km) Metrolink line branching from Cornbrook tram stop to Eccles via Salford Quays was confirmed as Phase 2 of Metrolink. No funding came from central government and money was raised from the Greater Manchester Passenger Transport Authority (GMPTA), the European Regional Development Fund and private developers. In April 1997 Altram, a consortium of the Serco, Ansaldo and John Laing was appointed to construct the Eccles Line; Serco, responsible for the Sheffield Supertram would operate the whole network under contract; Ansaldo provided six additional vehicles — AnsaldoBreda T-68As – and signalling equipment. Construction work officially began on 17 July 1997.

The Eccles Line was officially opened as far as Broadway tram stop on 6 December 1999 by the Prime Minister, Tony Blair a service to Eccles Interchange joined the network on 21 July 2000, and was officially declared open by Anne, Princess Royal at a ceremony on 9 January 2001. On completion, Phases 1 and 2 gave Metrolink a total route length of 24 miles (39 km). Phase 2 was predominantly privately funded and cost £160 million (£304,070,000 as of 2025). The line navigated the Quays on a slow and meandering route, and in competition with comparatively quicker and cheaper buses, failed to reach its initial passenger targets. Patronage increased during the 2000s as the Eccles Line steadily increased in popularity in keeping with a rise in passenger numbers across the whole Metrolink system and was beginning to become overcrowded by the end of the decade.

=== Phase 3 ===
In 2000, officials and transport planners in Greater Manchester decided that the top public transport priority was a third phase of Metrolink expansion, which would create four new lines along key transport corridors in Greater Manchester: the Oldham and Rochdale Line (routed northeast to Oldham and Rochdale), the East Manchester Line (routed east to East Manchester and Ashton-under-Lyne), the South Manchester Line (routed southeast to Chorlton-cum-Hardy and East Didsbury), and the Airport Line (routed south to Wythenshawe and Manchester Airport). GMPTE and the Association of Greater Manchester Authorities (AGMA) lobbied central government to provide partial funding to upgrade the current network with a new depot, passenger information displays, and construct four new lines in a single Phase 3 contract (dubbed the "Big Bang") worth £489 million (£929,300,000 as of 2025).

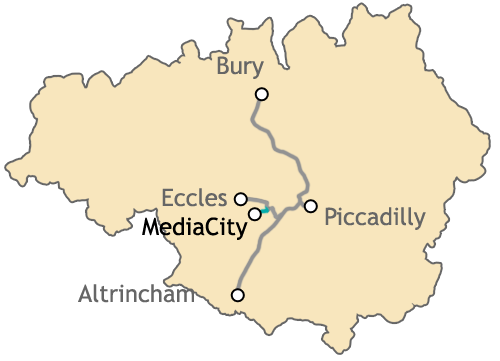
Spur to MediaCityUK opened 2010.

Estimated costs were later revised in 2002 to £820 million (£1,520,200,000 as of 2025), meaning Metrolink required a Government contribution of at least £520 million. With costs predicted to rise further, on 20 July 2004, Alistair Darling (the Secretary of State for Transport) announced the Government had withdrawn its share of funding Metrolink due to excessive costs.

In response, highlighting the legal costs and demolition of property in anticipation of the new lines, the Get Our Metrolink Back on Track (or Back on Track ) campaign spearheaded by the Manchester Evening News and Members of Parliament from Greater Manchester was organised to lobby the Department for Transport to fund Phase 3. Following negotiations, Phase 3 funding was confirmed by Douglas Alexander on 6 July 2006, albeit with adjustments (such as axing the Wythenshawe Loop) and splitting the project into two stages: Phase 3a, elements of expansion funded by government investment; and Phase 3b, elements requiring an alternative funding source. The MPact-Thales consortium, composed of Laing O'Rourke, VolkerRail and the Thales Group, was appointed to design, build and maintain the 20 miles (32 km) of new line plus a new depot at Old Trafford. A 0.25-mile (0.40 km) spur off the Eccles Line to the new MediaCityUK development at Salford Quays, funded separately by the Northwest Regional Development Agency (NWRDA), would also fall to Mpact-Thales.

==== Phase 3a: Oldham, Rochdale, South & East Manchester ====
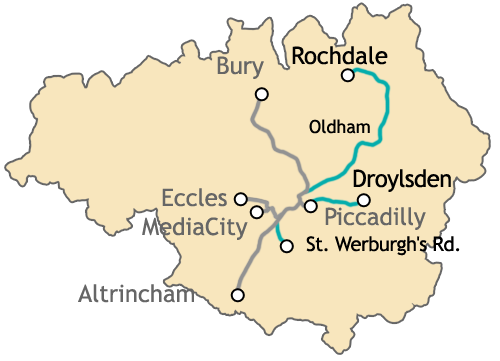
Metrolink after Phase 3a (2009–13)

Phase 3a involved converting the 14-mile (23 km) Oldham Loop heavy rail line from Victoria to Rochdale via Oldham, building a new 1.7-mile (2.7 km) South Manchester Line from Trafford Bar to St Werburgh's Road in Chorlton-cum-Hardy (on a closed section of Cheshire Lines Committee railway), and construction of a new 4-mile (6.4 km) East Manchester Line from Piccadilly to Droylsden. The Oldham and Rochdale and South Manchester Line's were funded by a £244 million lump sum from the government. The East Manchester Line to Droylsden was funded by borrowings by GMPTE that would be repaid over 30 years using fare revenue from Metrolink.

The Oldham Loop Line closed on 3 October 2009 allowing work to convert the line from heavy rail to Metrolink, Conversion of the Oldham Loop for Metrolink allowed for the addition of new stops along the line, including Monsall, South Chadderton, and Newbold; Kingsway Business Park tram stop was authorised at a late stage of planning in July 2011.

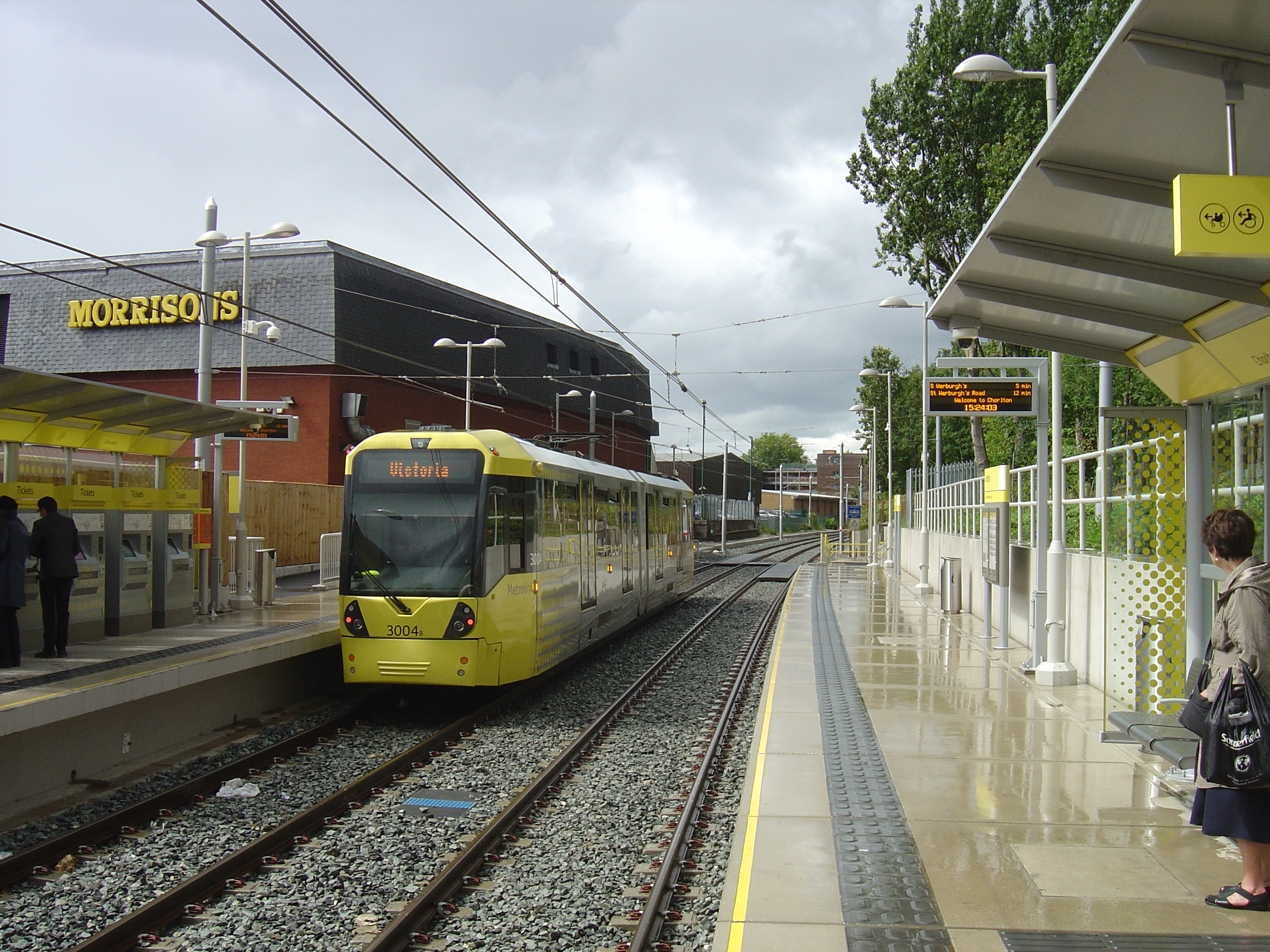
Chorlton tram stop, on the new South Manchester Line, shortly after opening in July 2011.

Services on the spur from the Eccles Line to MediaCityUK tram stop began on 20 September 2010, serving the MediaCityUK development, and The Lowry arts centre.

The planned opening of Phase 3a services was initially delayed on each line by months due to faults with a new £22 million digital signalling and control system known as the Tram Management System, or TMS, designed by the Thales Group. On its inauguration, TMS experienced several faults on the expanded Eccles Line, causing "chaos" at MediaCityUK, and 24 service delays on the network between September 2010 and February 2011.

On the South Manchester Line, services to St Werburgh's Road tram stop commenced on 7 July 2011. On the Oldham and Rochdale Line, services from Manchester to Central Park and Oldham Mumps were expected to open in spring 2011 and autumn 2011 respectively, but problems with TMS and the need to renew structures delayed services until 13 June 2012, when 7.1 miles (11.4 km) of the line from Victoria to Oldham Mumps tram stop opened in a single stage. A service on the Oldham and Rochdale Line from Oldham Mumps as far as Shaw & Crompton tram stop began on 16 December 2012.

In January 2013, a contract dispute between TfGM and Thales Group over missed deadlines and poor performance of TMS resulted in TfGM withholding payments for unfulfilled construction targets. Services to Rochdale and Droylsden were scheduled for a spring 2012 opening date, but delayed by months because of problems with the implementation of TMS. The East Manchester Line to Droylsden opened with a trial to local residents on 8 February 2013, and to the general public on 11 February 2013. On 28 February 2013, passenger services expanded along the 4.6-mile (7.4 km) stretch of the Oldham and Rochdale Line between Shaw & Crompton and Rochdale railway station, completing Phase 3a, and giving Metrolink a total network length of 43 miles (69 km). On 9 May 2013, TMS was successfully implemented in the City Zone, providing real-time passenger information displays at all stops in Manchester city centre.

==== Phase 3b: Ashton-under-Lyne, East Didsbury and Manchester Airport ====
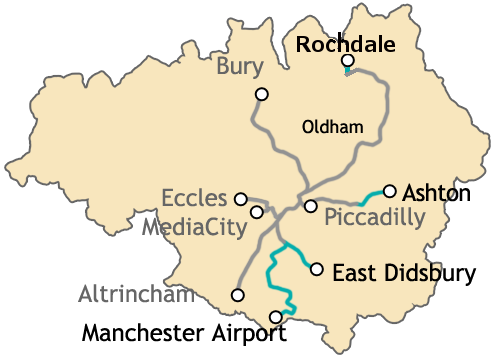
Metrolink after Phase 3b (2013–14)

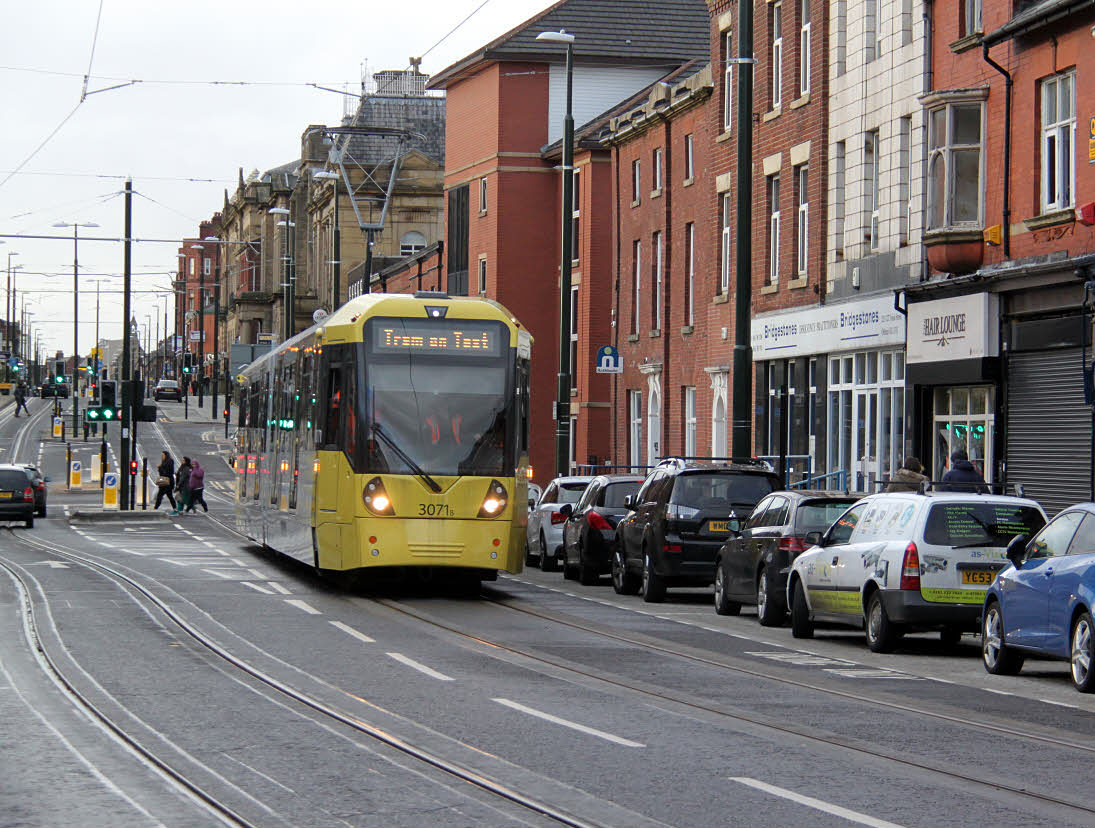
A Bombardier M5000 tram running through Union Street, on the Oldham town centre line opened in January 2014.

Phase 3b involved extending the East Manchester Line by 2.4 miles (3.9 km) from Droylsden to Ashton-under-Lyne; extending the South Manchester Line by 2.7 miles (4.3 km) from St Werburgh's Road to Didsbury; and creating a new 9-mile (14 km) Airport Line to Manchester Airport from a junction at St Werburgh's Road. Phase 3b also enacted long held plans first drawn up in 1983, to re-route and extend the Oldham and Rochdale Line with street running routes through Oldham and Rochdale town centres, both of which were poorly served by using the outlying Oldham Mumps and Rochdale railway stations alone.

Tasked with procuring funds for Phase 3b from sources other than central Government, in July 2007 GMPTE and AGMA submitted a bid to the Transport Innovation Fund, which would release a multimillion-pound sum for public transport improvements linked to viable anti-road traffic congestion strategies. A referendum on the Greater Manchester Transport Innovation Fund was held in Greater Manchester on 19 December 2008, in which 79% of voters rejected plans for public transport improvements linked to a peak-time weekday-only Greater Manchester congestion charge. In May 2009, Greater Manchester Integrated Transport Authority (formerly GMPTA) and AGMA agreed to create the Greater Manchester Transport Fund, £1.5billion raised from a combination of a levy on council tax in Greater Manchester, government grants, contributions from the Manchester Airports Group, Metrolink fares and third-party funding for "major transport schemes" in the region. Phase 3b was approved with funding on a line-by-line basis between March and August 2010.

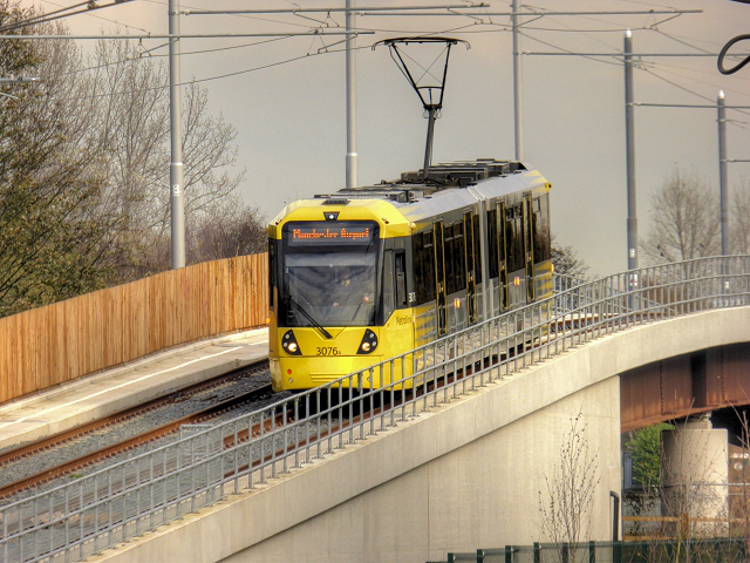
A tram passing over a purpose built viaduct over the River Mersey on the newly opened Airport Line, in November 2014

Construction work for all Phase 3b lines began in March 2011. The 2.7-mile (4.3 km) route of the South Manchester Line from St Werburgh's Road to East Didsbury tram stop was the first section of Phase 3b line to open on 23 May 2013 – three months ahead of schedule. The East Manchester Line was completed on 9 October 2013 with a new service routed 2.1 miles (3.4 km) between Droylsden and Ashton-under-Lyne tram stop, taking the total system length to 47.7 miles (76.8 km). The Oldham and Rochdale Line was completed with a street-running service through Oldham town centre on 27 January 2014, and the addition of a street-running service between Rochdale railway station and Rochdale Town Centre on 31 March 2014, taking the total system length to 48.5 miles (78.1 km).

On 3 November 2014, the network once again expanded, with an extension to Manchester Airport railway station, bringing the length of the system to 92.5 kilometres (57.5 mi), making it the longest tramway in the United Kingdom, and the longest light railway. It opened more than one year early, and at a cost of £368 million.

=== Phase 2CC – Second City Crossing ===
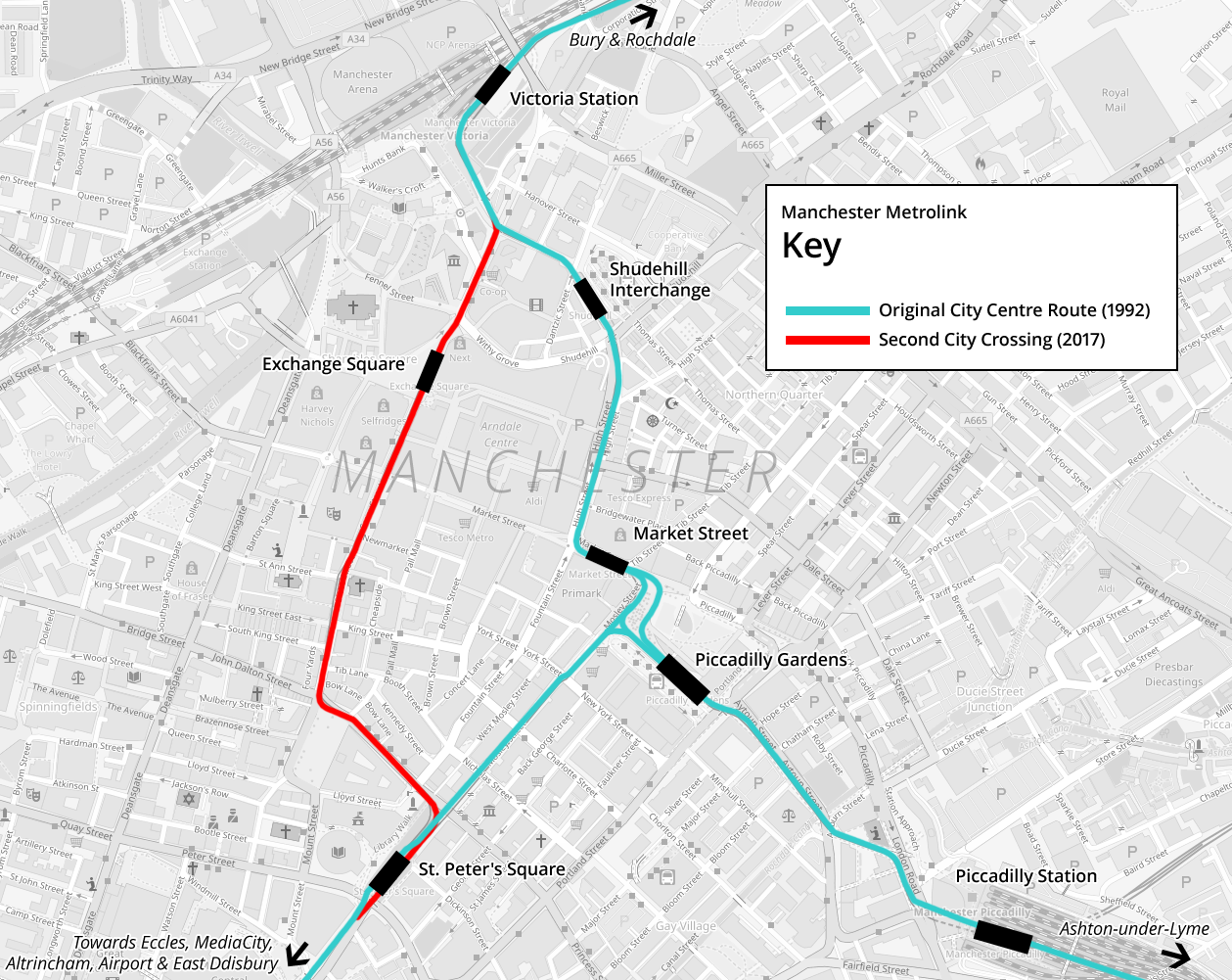
Phase 2CC created a new line through Manchester city centre (shown in red) to alleviate a bottleneck and to provide a new stop at Exchange Square.

The Second City Crossing (also known as 2CC) is the second Metrolink route across Manchester city centre, which opened in 2017. Its 0.8-mile (1.3 km) route begins at St Peter's Square tram stop, and branches off north-west to run along Princess Street and Albert Square, before turning north-east along Cross Street and Corporation Street to rejoin the original Metrolink line just before Victoria station. There is only one stop on the new route, Exchange Square tram stop.

The Second City Crossing was first proposed in 2011 as a means to improve capacity, flexibility and reliability as the rest of the system expanded due to phases 3a and 3b. Following the submission of a planning document under the Transport and Works Act 1992, and a public inquiry held throughout 2013, the 2CC route was granted approval on 8 October 2013 by the Secretary of State for Transport, Patrick McLoughlin, and signed off on 28 October 2013 by the Greater Manchester Combined Authority.

Funded by the Greater Manchester Transport Fund, construction started in early 2014 on the new Exchange Square tram stop, and the first tracks of the line were laid in late November 2014. As part of the project, St Peter's Square, Manchester was re-ordered and the Cenotaph was re-sited to accommodate the expanded tram interchange. The realigned tracks were laid over the site of the former St Peter's Church (demolished 1907). To protect the remaining underground burial vaults of the church, concrete slabs were put in place below street level before the tram tracks were laid. The stone cross marking the location of the former church was restored and re-instated close to its original location, in between the tracks.

The northern section of the new route became operational on 6 December 2015, when Exchange Square, along with a 500-metre stretch of track between the new stop and Victoria was opened, meaning a Shaw & Crompton-to-Exchange Square service could begin. The first test tram to run the entire route ran on 1 December 2016, with the first passenger service operating on 26 February 2017.

=== Trafford Park Line extension ===
The Transport & Works Act Order for the 3.4-mile (5.5 km) Trafford Park Line was granted in October 2016. Enabling works began in January 2017. The line opened on 22 March 2020.

=== Opening dates ===
Metrolink line opening timeline
Phase	Line	Date	Notes
1	Bury Line	6 April 1992	Bury – Victoria
1	First City Crossing	27 April 1992	Victoria – G-Mex
1	Altrincham Line	15 June 1992	G-Mex – Altrincham
1	Piccadilly spur	20 July 1992	spur to Piccadilly (from First City Crossing)
2	Eccles Line	6 December 1999	Cornbrook – Broadway
2	Eccles Line	21 July 2000	Broadway – Eccles
3a	MediaCityUK spur	20 September 2010	spur to MediaCityUK (from Eccles Line)
3a	South Manchester Line	7 July 2011	Trafford Bar – St Werburgh's Road
3a	Oldham and Rochdale Line	13 June 2012	Victoria – Oldham Mumps
3a	Oldham and Rochdale Line	16 December 2012	Oldham Mumps – Shaw and Crompton
3a	East Manchester Line	11 February 2013	Piccadilly – Droylsden
3a	Oldham and Rochdale Line	28 February 2013	Shaw and Crompton – Rochdale Railway Station
3b	South Manchester Line	23 May 2013	St Werburgh's Road – East Didsbury
3b	East Manchester Line	9 October 2013	Droylsden – Ashton-under-Lyne
3b	Oldham and Rochdale Line	27 January 2014	Freehold – Derker via Oldham town centre
3b	Oldham and Rochdale Line	31 March 2014	Rochdale Railway Station – Rochdale Town Centre
3b	Airport Line	3 November 2014	St Werburgh's Road – Manchester Airport
2CC	Second City Crossing	6 December 2015	Victoria – Exchange Square
2CC	Second City Crossing	26 February 2017	Exchange Square – St Peter's Square
-	Trafford Park Line	22 March 2020	Pomona – The Trafford Centre

== Branding and publicity ==
Metrolink branding

Original GMT branding

c.1987

1992–2009

2003 (interim)

2008–present

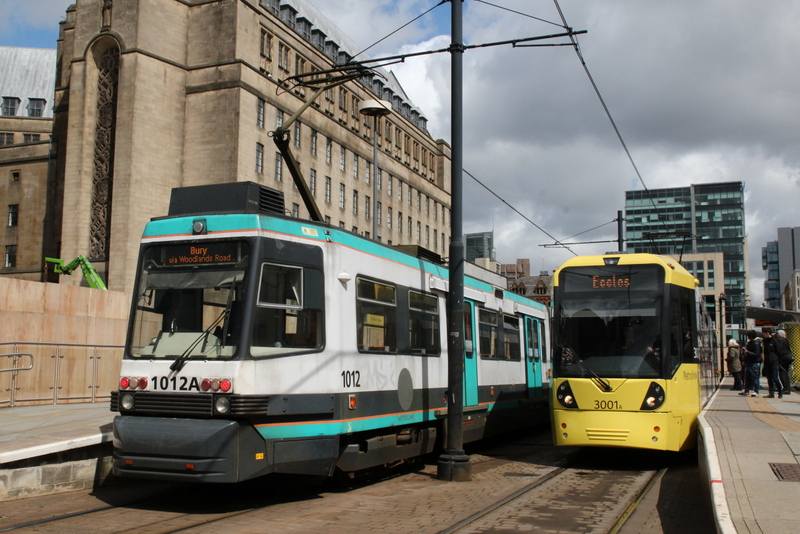
Brand transition: AnsaldoBreda T-68 & Bombardier M5000 trams in old and new livery in 2013

When proposals to build a light rail system for Greater Manchester were revealed in 1984, the system was originally described as "Light Rapid Transit", or LRT for short. Artists' impressions of the proposed LRT vehicles depicted them in orange and white livery, bearing the Greater Manchester Transport "M" logo, sharing the same branding as GMT buses of the period.

The Metrolink name was first introduced in 1987 in time for the tendering process to build and operate the system. Promotional literature distributed at this time contained new illustrations of the light rail vehicles, depicted with light grey livery, an orange logo which used the Greater Manchester Transport "M" monogram to form the "M" of Metrolink and double orange stripes continuing along the sides of the vehicles.

The name of the new system was the subject of public discussion, in particular how local people would refer to it colloquially. In August 1991, in partnership with BBC Manchester, Metrolink ran a "Nickname Metrolink" competition to find an affectionate short name for the system, comparable to "The Tube" for London Underground and "The L" for the Chicago elevated transit system. Most submissions were inspired by textile manufacturing, Greater Manchester's historic staple industry, using names such as "The Thread" and "The Shuttle", but the winning entry was "The Met".

When the system opened in 1992, an aquamarine and grey colour scheme was used for vehicle livery, signage and publicity, and a new Metrolink logo was introduced which was composed of a stylised "M" monogram placed at an angle within a circle. Vehicles were originally painted white with a dark grey skirt and a turquoise stripe at base of body; around the opening of Metrolink's Phase 2 the livery was adapted to include aquamarine doors.

In 2003, GMPTE introduced new branding for Metrolink to promote its proposals for the "Big Bang" network expansion project. The logo featured a new "M" symbol formed from yellow and blue upward arrows, with the strapline "Transforming our Future". This logo was not used on trams or signage, however.

In October 2008 a new corporate identity was created by Hemisphere Design & Marketing Consultants of Manchester. The design features a pale yellow and grey colour scheme, a logotype in the specially-commissioned Pantograph sans regular typeface by the Dalton Maag type foundry, and the "M" symbol has been replaced by a diamond motif formed from a pattern of repeating circles. The designs have been applied to signage and publicity, and tram livery features yellow at the vehicle ends with grey sides and black doors. The yellow colour scheme has been likened to the Merseyrail branding used in neighbouring Liverpool.

== Operator ==
Metrolink was originally built and operated from 1989 by the consortium Greater Manchester Metro Limited (GMML). In 1997 the contract was awarded to a new consortium, Altram (Manchester) Limited, a consortium of Ansaldo Transporti, Serco, Laing and 3i. Serco Metrolink, took over the operations and maintenance of the system on 26 May 1997. In March 2003, Serco Investments bought out its partners and Altram (Manchester) Limited became a wholly owned subsidiary of Serco.

On 15 July 2007, Stagecoach commenced operating a 10-year contract to operate Metrolink. Unlike Serco, Stagecoach did not own the concession, merely operated it on a fixed-term management contract. RATP Group bought the contract from Stagecoach on 1 August 2011.

In October 2015, TfGM announced RATP Group, Keolis/Amey, National Express and Transdev had been shortlisted to bid for the next contract starting in July 2017.

== Modifications since construction ==
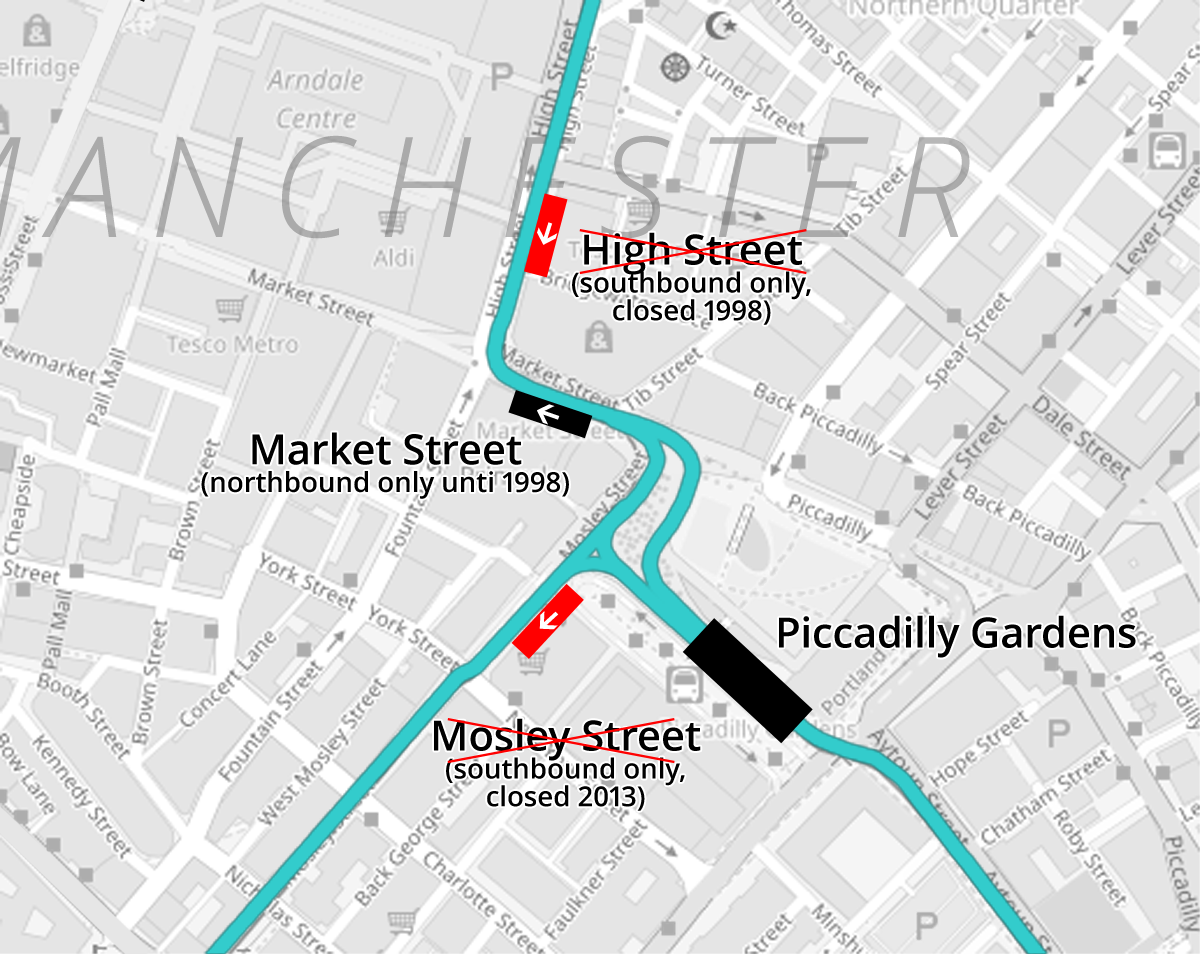
Map of the original layout of Market Street (northbound) and High Street (southbound) tram stops in 1992

The following modifications to the system have taken place since the opening of Phase I in 1992.

- The original Market Street tram stop handled trams to Bury, with High Street tram stop handling trams from Bury. When Market Street was pedestrianised, High Street stop was closed, and Market Street stop was rebuilt to handle trams in both directions, opening in its new form in 1998.
- Shudehill Interchange opened between Victoria station and Market Street in April 2003. The bus station complementing it opened on 29 January 2006.
- Cornbrook tram stop was opened in 1999 on the Altrincham line to provide an interchange with the new line to Eccles. There was initially no public access from the street, but this changed on 3 September 2005 when the original fire exit was opened as a public access route.
- Two of the original stops; Mosley Street, and Woodlands Road were closed in 2013. The latter being replaced by two new stops (Abraham Moss and Queens Road) opened nearby.

By the mid-2000s, most of the track on the Bury and Altrincham routes was 1960 track which needed to be relaid. In 2006, it was decided a £107 million programme to replace this worn track would take place in 2007.

== See also ==
- Manchester Metrolink
- Transport in Manchester
- Manchester Corporation Tramways
