= John Mowlem Burt =

English stonemason and contractor

Sir John Mowlem Burt (2 February 1845 – 20 February 1918) worked in the UK construction industry during the late 19th and early 20th centuries. He was part of the Mowlem firm of contractors and was from the third generation of the family that were involved with the company.

== Biography ==
Born in London the eldest son of George Burt, educated privately and at Marischal College in Aberdeen he joined the family contracting firm, Mowlem, Freeman & Burt, in 1862, was appointed a partner in 1875, and made senior partner in 1885.

He oversaw several major projects in London including the Admiralty extensions and Admiralty Arch (1896–1901, 1906–14); New Scotland Yard (1908); Institution of Civil Engineers (1911); and refronting Buckingham Palace (1913). As contractor for the coronation annexe at Westminster Abbey he was knighted in 1902.

He was vice-chairman of Swanage Urban District Council from 1899 to 1902, and represented Swanage in Dorset County Council. He died at "Carthion", Durlston Park in Swanage, Dorset on 20 February 1918, aged 73.
