= George Burt (fencer) =

British businessman and fencer

George Burt KBE
Personal information
- Born: 10 January 1884 Westminster, London
- Died: 1 September 1964 (aged 80) EBlindley Heath, Surrey

Sport
- Sport: Fencing

Sir George Mowlem Burt KBE (10 January 1884 – 1 September 1964) was a British businessman and fencer, as well as a descendant of George Burt and John Mowlem.

== Biography ==
Born in Westminster, he was educated at Clifton College, where he first took up fencing. He later competed in the individual and team épée events at the 1920 Summer Olympics, being eliminated in the first round in both competitions. In 1922, he won the épée title at the British Fencing Championships.

Running his predecessor's construction firm, he involved himself in numerous projects, including the building of the BBC headquarters and the Port of London Authority building, as well as the rebuilding of Buckingham Palace following World War II. He was knighted by George VI of the United Kingdom in 1942 and died in 1964 in Blindley Heath, Surrey. Some insights into his time running Mowlem are to be found in Sir Harold Harding's autobiography, Harding worked for the company from 1922-1956.
