= GMML =

GMML may refer to:

- Hassan I Airport (ICAO:GMML) in Laâyoune, Western Sahara (administered by Morocco)
- Greater Manchester Metro Limited, a light rail consortium in Manchester, UK
