= Edgar Beck =

British civil engineer

Sir Edgar Beck
- Born: Edgar Charles Beck; 11 May 1911; Hackney, London
- Died: 29 July 2000; Salisbury, Wiltshire

Sir Edgar Charles Beck CBE (11 May 1911 – 29 July 2000) was a British civil engineer. He was managing director, chairman then president of Mowlem, one of the largest construction and civil engineering companies in the United Kingdom.

He was educated at Lancing College and then Jesus College, Cambridge before joining Mowlem in 1933. During World War II he helped with the construction of 10 airfields, and the Mulberry harbours used during the D-Day landings.

During Beck's chairmanship of Mowlem, the company reconstructed the 18th-century building at 10 Downing Street (1963), built the new London Bridge (1967), and built the NatWest Tower (1979, now Tower 42).

Beck was chairman of the Export Group for the Constructional Industries (1959–1963), and chairman of the council, then president, of the Federation of Civil Engineering Contractors. He was appointed a CBE in 1967 and was knighted in 1975.

Edgar Beck died in July 2000 and was survived by his wife, three sons and two daughters.
