= HSS Hire =

British tool and equipment hire supplier

HSS Hire Group plc
- Company type: Public company
- Traded as: LSE: HSS
- Founded: 1957
- Founder: Bert Taylor
- Headquarters: Manchester, England
- Area served: United Kingdom
- Key people: Steve Ashmore (CEO)
- Services: Tool and equipment hire
- Revenue: £349 million (2023)
- Net income: £12 million (2023)
- Website: www.hss.com/hire

HSS Hire Group plc is a supplier of tool and equipment hire in the United Kingdom and Ireland, as well as being a logistical and technical partner to businesses of all sizes. Operating under the banner of HSS Hire, the group has a network of over three hundred outlets. HSS Hire originated in Kensington, London in 1957.

== History ==
The company was founded in 1957, by Bert Taylor on Baron's Court Road, Kensington, London. Initially known as The Hire Service Company, the shop focused on tool and equipment hire.

Bert Taylor opened a further five shops during the 1960s across the area of West Central London, and towards the end of the 1960s, The Hire Service Company was later acquired by scaffolding conglomerate SGB, which owned eight tool rental shops under the name Hire Shops Limited. These company names were merged to create Hire Service Shops Limited or HSS Hire for short.

In April 1993, The Davis Service Group purchased the business from Mowlem. In December 2003, HSS Hire was purchased by 3i. In June 2007, the business was sold to Aurigo and Och-Ziff.

In November 2012, HSS Hire purchased the diesel generator hire company ABIRD. In April 2014, HSS Hire purchased the diesel generator hire company from Scotland, Apex Generators.

In February 2015, it floated on the London Stock Exchange as HSS Hire Group plc. Since then, the company lost its chief executive, and issued a series of profit warnings; as of August 2017, the value of the company had dropped by over two/thirds from its flotation value of £332 million, to £96 million. On 11 May 2015, they purchased the heat/cooling hire company, All Seasons Hire.

The company holds a 4* British Safety Award. In addition, HSS are ISO9000:20, ISO 14001, Safe Hire accredited and holders of Investors in People status. HSS Hire also work with the Royal Society for the Prevention of Accidents (ROSPA) and the government's Health & Safety Executive to promote safety in the hire industry. HSS Hire have also contributed to community support efforts, with youth training schemes set up for disadvantaged youths in London.

In October 2025 HSS sold its physical rental operations including 130 depots, to Endless for £1 with HSS to focus on its ProService digital marketplace business. HSS sold a 10% stake in ProService to Speedy Hire, which will acquire a number of HSS depots with 300 HSS employees to transfer. HSS Hire Group will be renamed ProService Building Services Marketplace.

== Network ==
The tool hire market comprises customer sectors ranging from the occasional DIY user to the largest national construction companies. In between falls just about every other industrial group, public sector organisation and specialist trade contractor.

HSS is a logistical and technical partner to businesses of all sizes. It has a 250 strong network of Supercentres, hire centres and agencies. In August 2005, HSS Hire bought one of Ireland's biggest independent tool and plant hire businesses. They have developed and opened many branches since then.

== Controversies ==
=== Minimum wage accusations ===
In June 2014, HSS was named and shamed by the Department for Business, Innovation and Skills for paying several workers below the legal minimum wage.

In October 2013, the company had acknowledged that 15 employees had been underpaid by a total of £149, but attributed this to an administrative error that had been proactively rectified within one month of being made. They confirmed a commitment to paying all staff fairly and legally, and to investing in people. They were reported to be 'outraged' at the accusation that they had not complied with minimum wage legislation, and demanded an apology from Business Minister Jenny Willott for making it.
