= Rafael Serrano =

Spanish financier and entrepreneur

Rafael Serrano Quevedo
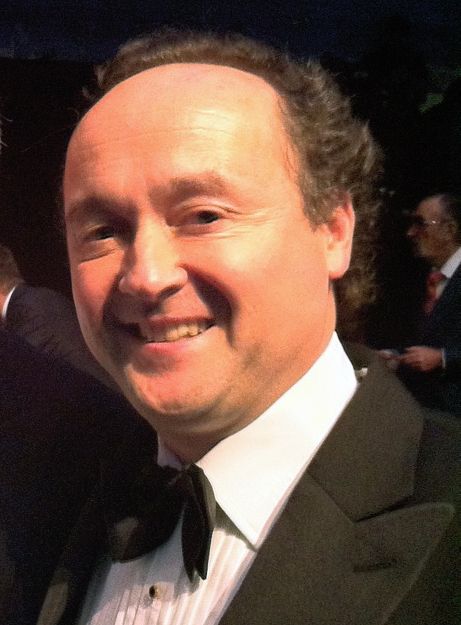
- Serrano in 2012
- Born: Rafael Serrano Quevedo
- Occupation: Chief executive officer Prime Investors Capital

Rafael Serrano Quevedo is a Spanish businessman and investor. As CEO of Prime Investors Capital (PIC), Serrano purchased a 250-year lease to Admiralty Arch from the UK Government in 2012, transforming it into a 5-star hotel, luxury residences, and a private members' club. In August 2013, PIC was granted full planning permission by Westminster City Council to restore and convert Admiralty Arch into a 100-room luxury hotel, private residences and private members' club. The restoration of Admiralty Arch remain fully ongoing. Prime Investors Capital and Rafael Serrano won the bid and led the transformation and restoration of the iconic British landmark into the new and only Waldorf Astoria Hotel and Residences.

== Career ==
Rafael Serrano started his career in 1991 as an investment banker at JP Morgan, first in the City and then in Wall Street, New York.

In 2009, Serrano became the Founder and CEO of Prime Investors Capital (PIC) Limited, an investment management company focusing on Finance, Private Equity and Property. Prime Investors Capital was responsible for the origination, funding and development of the BVLGARI Hotel and Residences in Knightsbridge, which at the time of its opening in 2012 was the most expensive hotel in London.

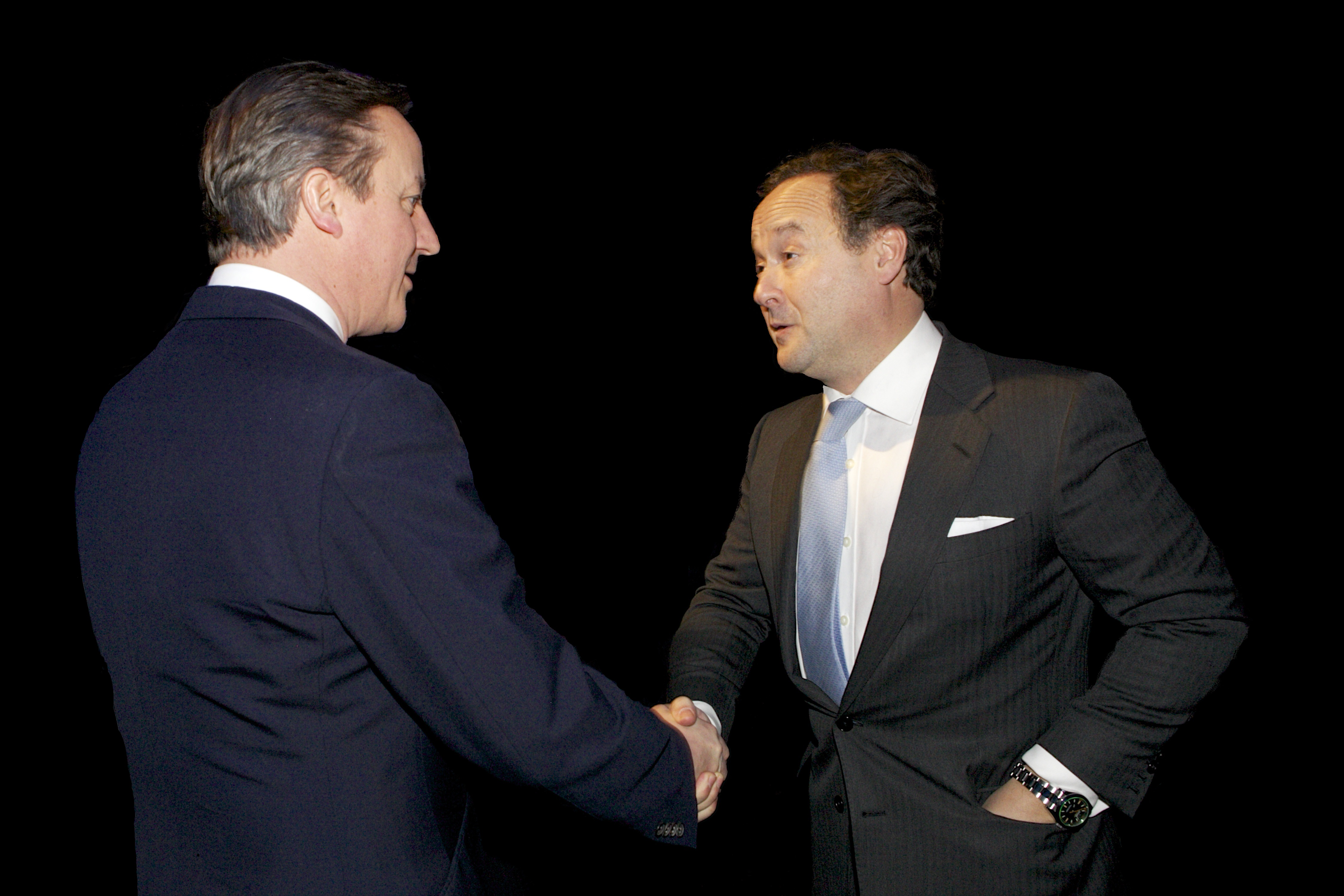
The Right Honourable David Cameron MP and Rafael Serrano, London February 2014

In October 2012, Prime Investors Capital led a UK-based team of 20 British companies to secure a bid to purchase a 250-year lease of Admiralty Arch from the UK Government, with plans to restore the Grade I listed building and create a hotel that preserves its historic design. Serrano purchased the 250-year lease of Admiralty Arch from the UK Government in October 2012.

Admiralty Arch is the first major building to be sold by the Government, as part of austerity measures to rationalise their property portfolio and raise funds for the Exchequer. Originally designed by Sir Aston Webb and built by John Mowlen & Co in 1912 in memory of Queen Victoria, the building has been the recent home of the Cabinet Office. It was previously the address of the First Sea Lord and high-ranking naval officers.

In November 2012, Serrano was named in the top 1000 most influential Londoners by the Evening Standard newspaper.

In May 2020, Serrano supported the London Taxi Drivers Association's efforts offering taxi services to local health centres and key workers during the COVID-19 pandemic.
