= Kingsway Business Park =

Business park in Rochdale, England

Coordinates: 53.604°N 2.128°W

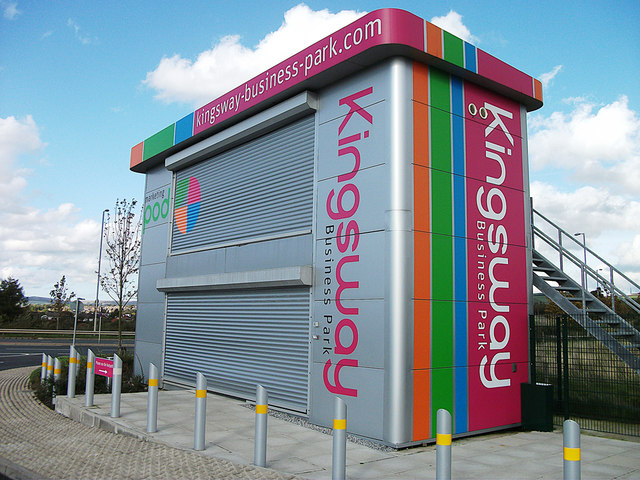
- Interactive map of Kingsway Business Park
- Location: Milnrow/Rochdale, Greater Manchester, England
- Developer: Wilson Bowden
- Owner: North West Regional Development Agency, Wilson Bowden
- Size: 0.66 sq mi (1.7 km^{2})
- Website: kingsway-business-park.com

Kingsway Business Park is a 0.66-square-mile (1.7 km^{2}) business park in the Metropolitan Borough of Rochdale, in Greater Manchester, England.

JD Sports and Wincanton for ASDA have warehouses on the site. Kingsway Village, a part of the business park, is a planned housing estate between a nature reserve and range of office buildings and commercial premises.

Kingsway Business Park Metrolink station is a light rail stop on the northeastern side of the site.
