= Drake Street tram stop =

Unbuilt tram stop in Rochdale, England

Coordinates: 53°36′47″N 2°09′18″W

Drake Street

General information
- Location: Rochdale, Rochdale; England
- System: Metrolink station
- Line: Oldham and Rochdale Line
Route map
Location

Drake Street tram stop was a proposed tram stop for Greater Manchester's Metrolink light rail system, that was to be created to serve passengers boarding and alighting at Drake Street in Rochdale, England. It was also known by the name Wet Rake tram stop, and was set to be located on the Oldham and Rochdale Line between Rochdale railway station and Rochdale Town Centre tram stop.

Drake Street was set to be constructed during Phase 3b of Metrolink's expansion, but in March 2011 it was scrapped by the Greater Manchester Passenger Transport Executive which believed it would be too close to Rochdale Town Centre and could serve as an efficiency saving to allow the construction of Kingsway Business Park tram stop.

Preceding station	Manchester Metrolink	Following station
Rochdale Railway Station towards Victoria	Oldham and Rochdale Line	Rochdale Town Centre Terminus
