= Greater Manchester Metro Limited =

Light rail consortium in Manchester, England

- Type: Consortium
- Industry: Public transport - light rail
- Founded: 1989
- Defunct: 1997
- Fate: Contract terminated
- Successor: Serco
- Headquarters: Manchester, England
- Area served: Greater Manchester
- Services: Design, build and operations
- Owner: Ansaldo Transporti, Serco, Laing Civil Engineering, 3i

Greater Manchester Metro Limited (GMML) was a private company formed by the GMA consortium (GEC Alsthom, John Mowlem and AMEC) in 1989 to design, build and operate the Metrolink light rail system in Greater Manchester, England. Construction of the Metrolink system began in March 1990.

The contract was awarded for 15 years subject to early termination should the network be extended. In 1997 contracts for extension was let to Altram (Manchester), a consortium of Ansaldo Transporti, Serco, Laing Civil Engineering and 3i. Serco Metrolink, a wholly owned subsidiary of Serco Limited, took over the operations and maintenance of the system on 26 May 1997. In March 2003, Serco bought out its partners and Altram (Manchester) Limited became a wholly owned subsidiary of Serco.

In July 2007 the contract to operate Metrolink was awarded to Stagecoach. Unlike Serco, Stagecoach did not own the concession, merely operated it on a fixed-term management contract. Stagecoach later sold the contract to the RATP Group.
