= Admiralty Arch =

Triumphal arch and hotel in London, England

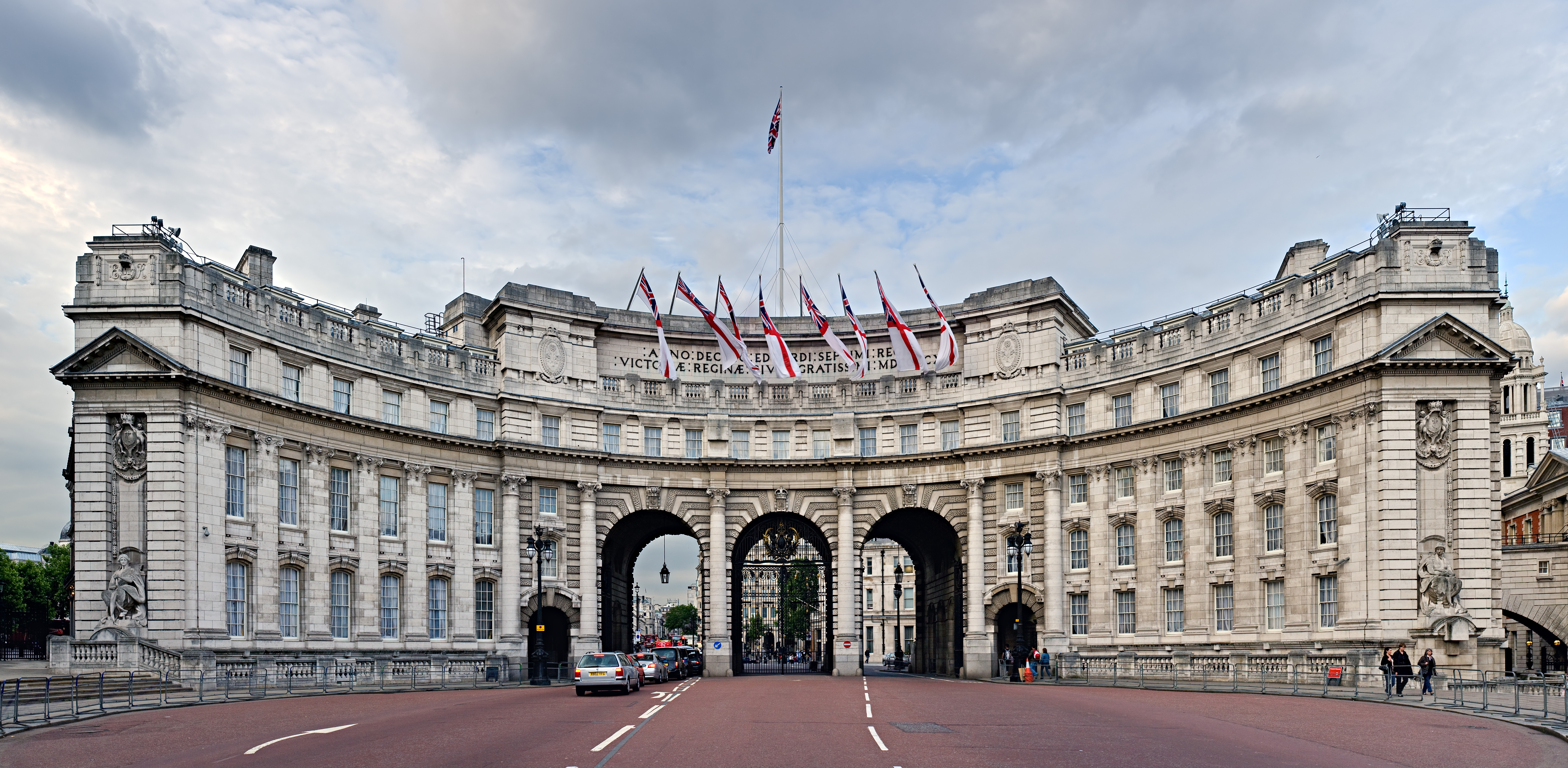
- Admiralty Arch seen from The Mall, June 2009

- Location within Central London

General information
- Status: Grade I listed
- Type: Triumphal arch, government building
- Architectural style: Neoclassical
- Location: The Mall, London, SW1, United Kingdom
- Coordinates: 51°30′24″N 0°07′43″W
- Current tenants: Motcomb Estates
- Completed: 1912; 114 years ago
- Client: Edward VII
- Owner: HM Government

Design and construction
- Architect: Aston Webb
- Main contractor: John Mowlem & Co

Admiralty Arch is a historic landmark building in London, providing road and pedestrian access between The Mall, which extends to the southwest, and Trafalgar Square to the northeast. Commissioned by King Edward VII in memory of his mother, Queen Victoria, it was designed by Aston Webb, and is now a Grade I listed building. Until 2011, the building housed government offices, including the residence of the First Sea Lord, and was used by the Admiralty. In 2012, the government sold the building on a 125-year lease for £60m for redevelopment into the Waldorf Astoria London - Admiralty Arch luxury hotel, which is scheduled to open in 2026.

== History ==
The arch was designed by Aston Webb, who also designed the Victoria Memorial and the new façade of Buckingham Palace at the other end of the Mall. Admiralty Arch was constructed by John Mowlem & Co and completed in 1912. It adjoins the Old Admiralty Building, hence the name. The building was commissioned by King Edward VII in memory of his mother Queen Victoria, although he did not live to see its completion in 1912. Admiralty Arch served as the official residence of the First Sea Lord, including Louis Mountbatten, 1st Earl Mountbatten of Burma. It also housed various government offices, initially for the Admiralty.

The structure, which combines the features of a triumphal arch with those of a government office building, is asymmetrical. As viewed from the Mall, the right wing of the building has one floor more than the left one: below the cornice there are three on the right, but just two on the left.

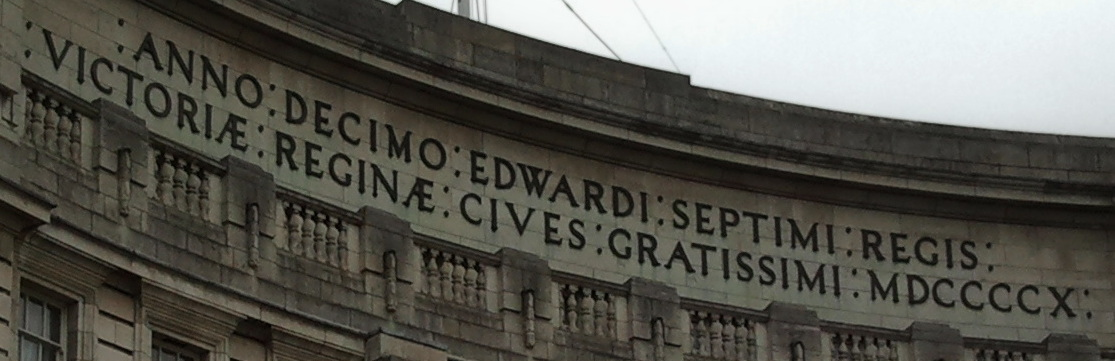
Latin inscription: ANNO DECIMO EDWARDI SEPTIMI REGIS / VICTORIÆ REGINÆ CIVES GRATISSIMI MDCCCCX (In the tenth year of King Edward VII / to Queen Victoria (from) most grateful citizens, 1910).

A Latin inscription along the top reads:

: ANNO : DECIMO : EDWARDI : SEPTIMI : REGIS :
: VICTORIÆ : REGINÆ : CIVES : GRATISSIMI : MDCCCCX :
(In the tenth year of King Edward VII, to Queen Victoria, from most grateful citizens, 1910)

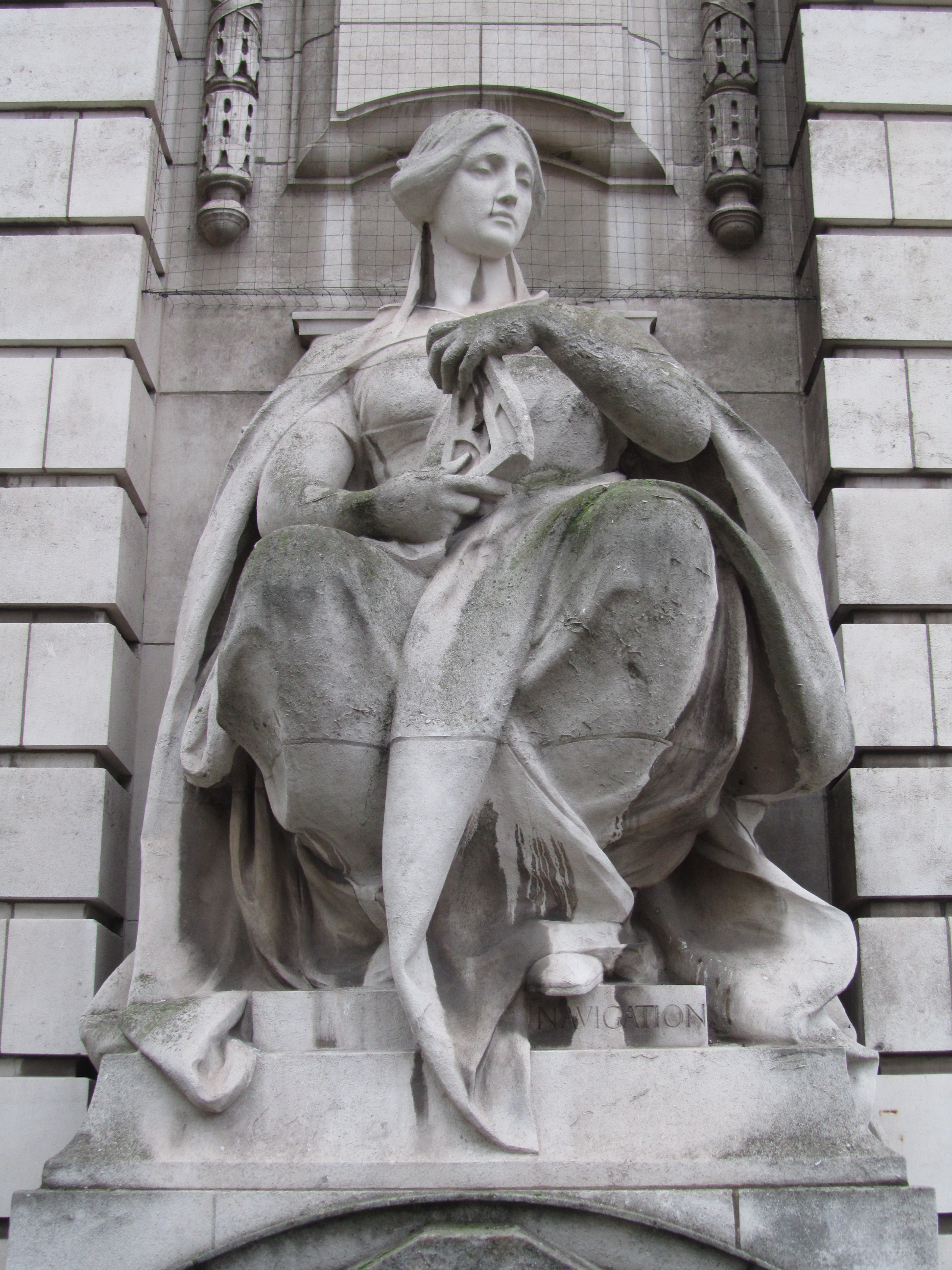
Thomas Brock's figure of Navigation

The sculptural figures of Navigation (left) and Gunnery (right) at the end of the two wings were designed by the English sculptor Thomas Brock.

Beneath the building is a warren of tunnels and chambers, including vaults which used to house the government archives. In 2000, the Cabinet Office moved into offices in the building, while maintaining its headquarters on Whitehall. It was also home to the Prime Minister's Strategy Unit and the Social Exclusion Task Force. In 2011, as part of the United Kingdom government austerity programme, the building became vacant and was put up for sale for a reported £75 million. In October 2012, the winning bidder was reported to be the Spanish real estate developer Rafael Serrano, who planned to turn the property into a luxury hotel. The property was sold as a 125-year lease. In February 2013, it was reported that Armani would operate the planned hotel. In August 2013, Westminster City Council granted full planning permission for the restoration and conversion of Admiralty Arch into a 100-room hotel, residences and private members' club.

The architects Blair Associates were retained by property developer Prime Investors Capital (run by Rafael Serrano) to convert the building into a hotel, restaurant and four apartments. The residences went on sale in July 2016.

In 2022, billionaire brothers David and Simon Reuben took over development of Admiralty Arch. The building is currently being converted into a luxury hotel under the Waldorf Astoria brand, and is scheduled to open in 2026.

There is reputedly an underground passage connecting Admiralty Arch to 10 Downing Street.

== Ceremonial use ==
As the ceremonial entrance from Trafalgar Square to The Mall, itself the ceremonial road leading up to Buckingham Palace, Admiralty Arch plays an important role on ceremonial occasions. Processions at royal weddings, funerals, coronations and other public processions such as the 2012 processions at the end of the Olympic and Paralympic Games all passed under its arches. The central archway is reserved for use by royalty.

== Nose ==
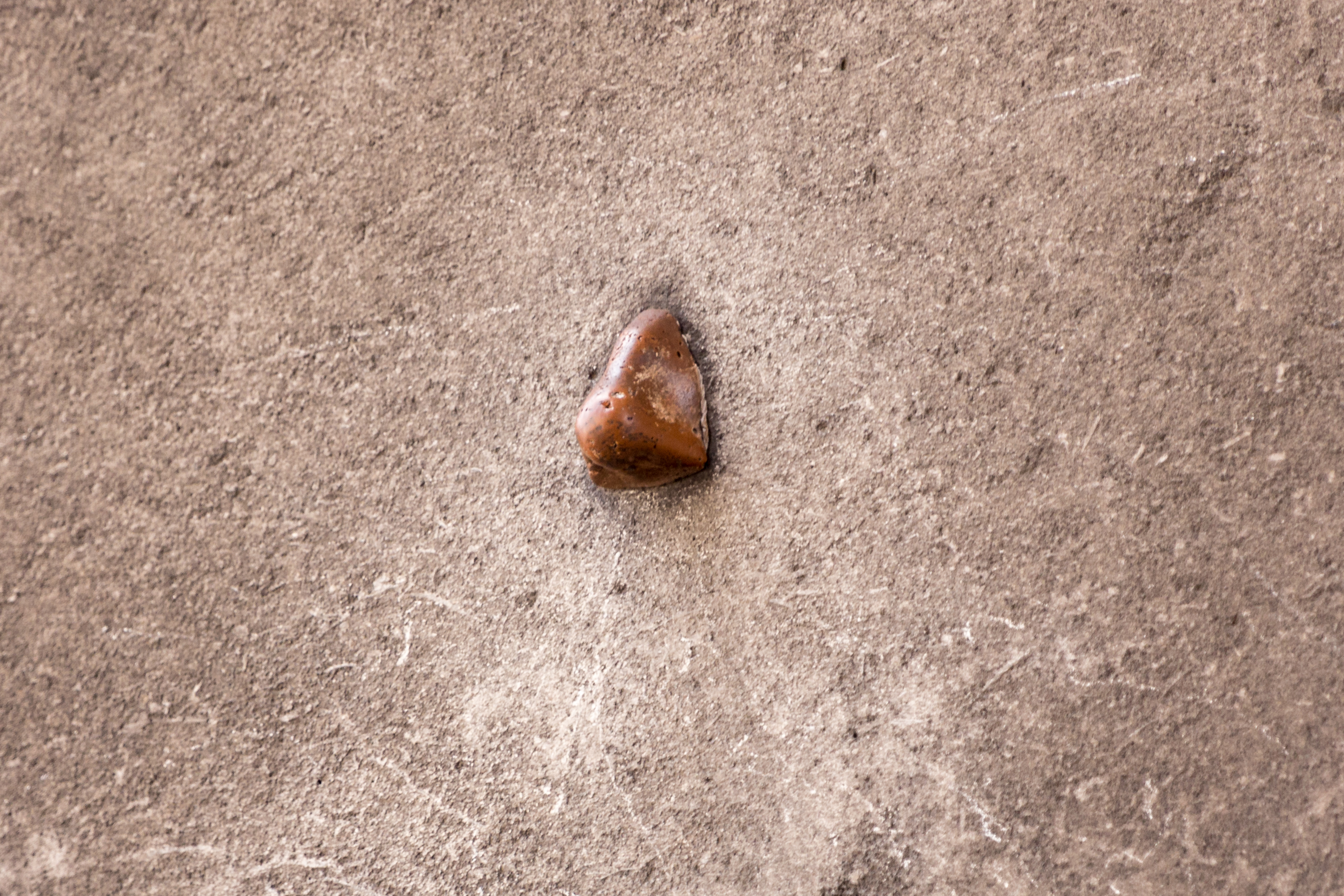
The nose

On the inside wall of the northernmost arch is a small protrusion the size and shape of a human nose. It was placed there by the artist Rick Buckley in 1997 as part of a campaign against the "Big Brother" society. The nose is at a height of about seven feet, and sits at waist-height for anyone riding through the arch on a horse.
