= Kingsway Business Park tram stop =

Manchester Metrolink tram stop

Kingsway Business Park
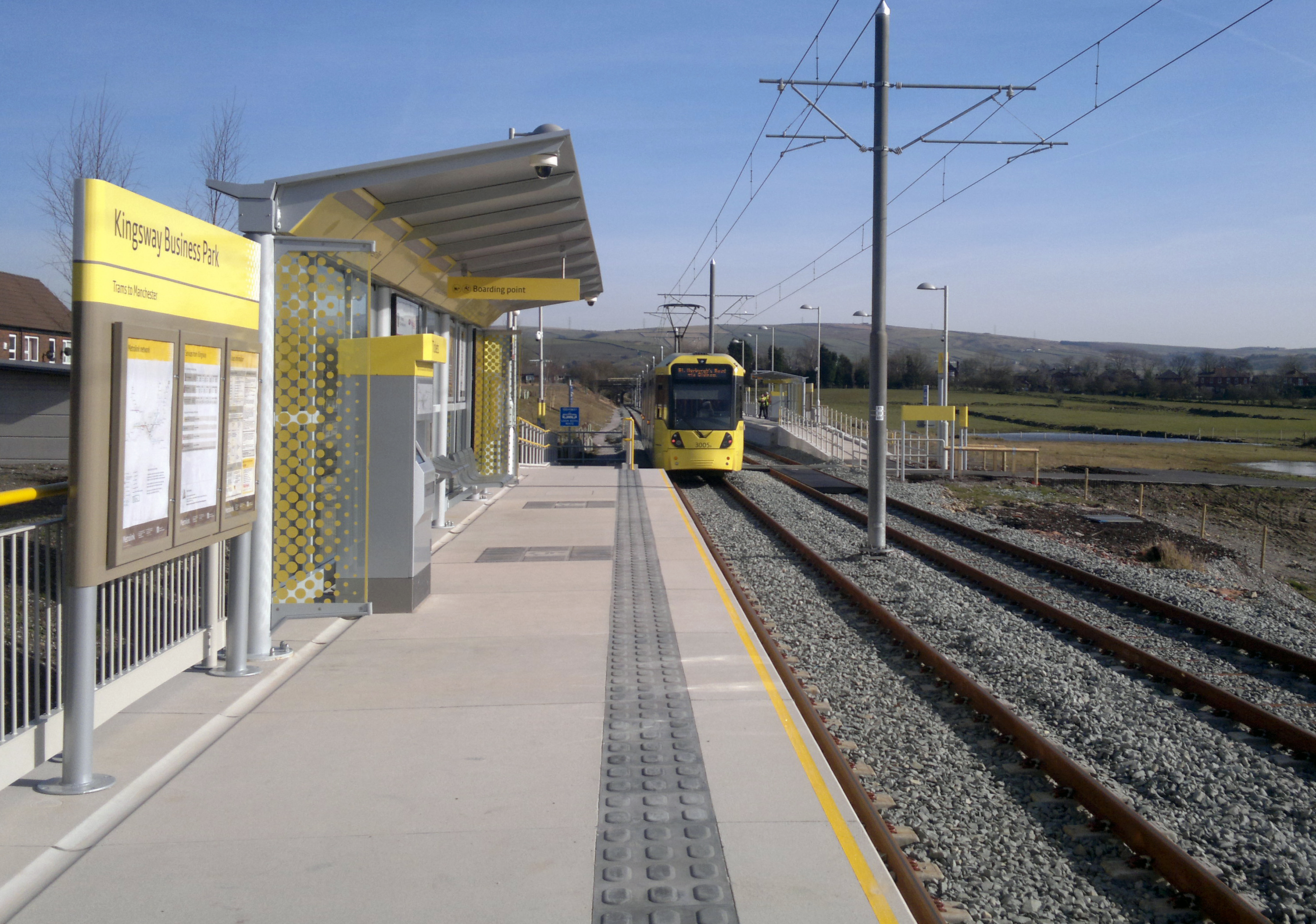
- Kingsway Business Park tram stop, on its opening day

General information
- Location: Firgrove, Rochdale; England
- Coordinates: 53.61110°N 2.12369°W
- Grid reference: SD919127
- System: Metrolink station
- Line: Oldham and Rochdale Line
- Platforms: 2

Other information
- Status: In operation
- Fare zone: 4

History
- Opened: 28 February 2013
Route map
Location

Kingsway Business Park is a tram stop on the Oldham and Rochdale Line (ORL) of Greater Manchester's Metrolink network. It is located in Firgrove, on the northeastern side of Kingsway Business Park in the Metropolitan Borough of Rochdale, between the Milnrow and Newbold stops. It opened as part of Phase 3a of the system's expansion, on 28 February 2013.

== History ==
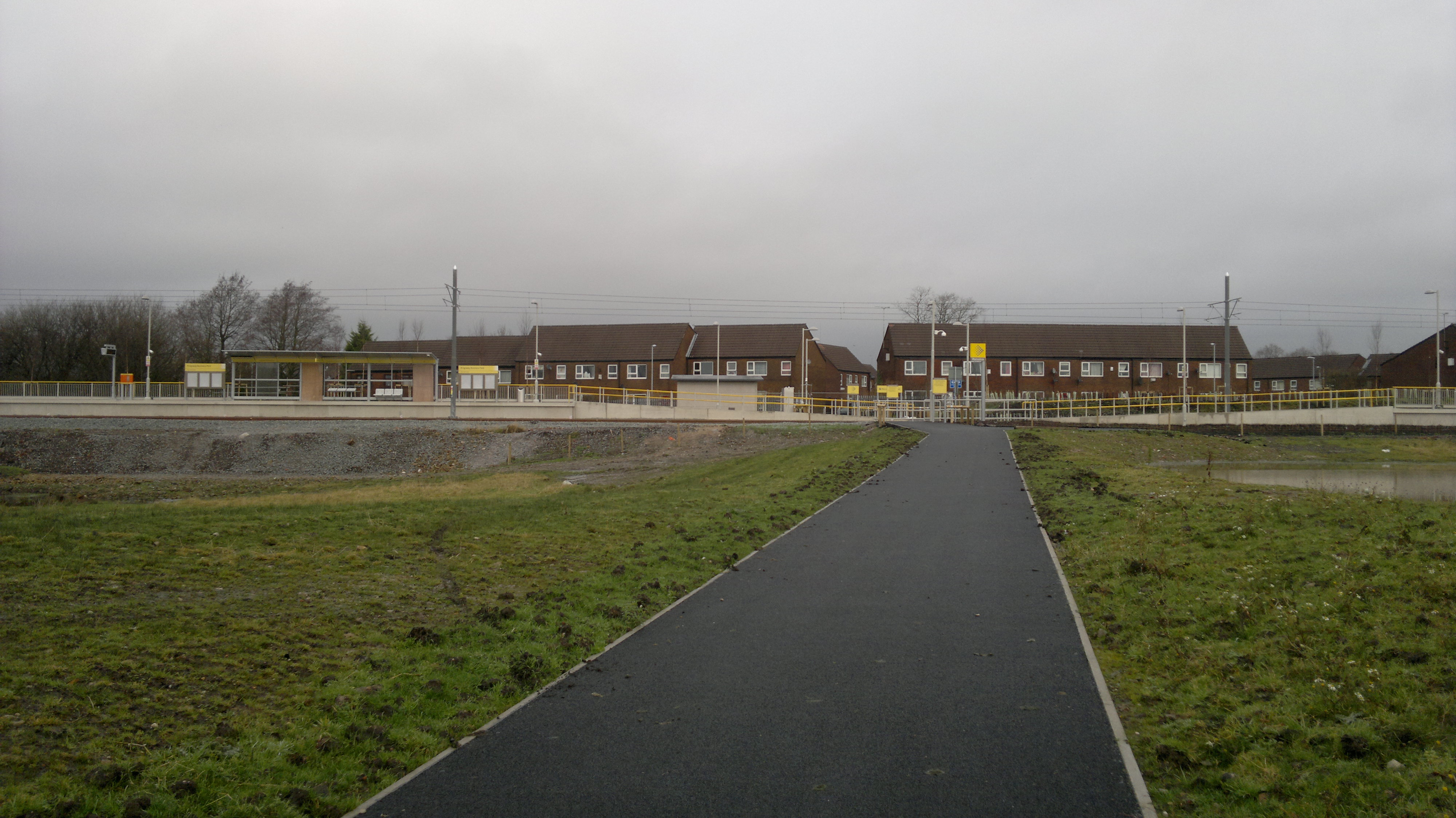
The station at Kingsway Business Park in January 2013, awaiting completion

Following the rejection of the Greater Manchester Transport Innovation Fund the station had an unknown future being unfunded by the rest of the 3A and 3B program with suggestions private contributions would be required for construction to proceed.

In March 2011 it was proposed to cancel the plans for Drake Street Metrolink station for being too close to Rochdale Station Metrolink stop and generate efficiency savings while it was also noted a significant gap in coverage existed around Kingsway which could lead to the construction of Kingsway Business Park after all. On 8 July 2011 the Transport for Greater Manchester Committee gave approval of the station after Rochdale Council pledged £2.5m towards the stop.

== Services ==
Kingsway Business Park is located on the Oldham & Rochdale Line with trams towards Manchester city centre and Rochdale Town Centre.

Services are mostly every 12 minutes on all routes.

Preceding station	Manchester Metrolink	Following station
Milnrow towards East Didsbury	East Didsbury–Rochdale	Newbold towards Rochdale Town Centre

== Connecting bus routes ==
Kingsway Business Park tram stop is served closest by Bee Network services 450/451 (Rochdale, Kingsway and Newhey circular) on nearby Leyfield Road.
