= Mowlem =

British construction and civil engineering company

- Industry: Construction; Business services
- Founded: 1822
- Fate: Acquired
- Successor: Carillion
- Headquarters: London, England
- Key people: Joe Darby, (Chairman); Sir John Gains, (CEO)
- Number of employees: 25,600

Mowlem was one of the largest construction and civil engineering companies in the United Kingdom.

The company was established as John Mowlem and Co. by John Mowlem and initially worked on behalf of various local authorities across London. It expanded throughout the nineteenth century, taking on increasingly prestigious undertakings. The company received the first of several Royal Warrants in 1902. One year later, John Mowlem and Co. was briefly incorporated before being reorganised as a partnership once again; the business was long operated by successive generations of the Mowlem and Burt families, including George Burt, and Sir John Mowlem Burt. During 1924, the company went public on the London Stock Exchange.

Throughout the Second World War, the company worked on numerous contracts issued by the British government, including the construction of the Mulberry harbour units. After the end of the conflict, it continued to developed its network of regional contracting businesses, often via acquisitions. During 1971, the company expanded overseas via its stake in the Australian contractor Barclay Brothers, which it would later take whole ownership of. Mowlem entered the private house building sector during 1986 although, following a recession during the early 1990s, it sold on the housing division to the rival homebuilder Beazer in 1994.

The mid-2000s was a period of great change for Mowlem. It entered a period of financial difficulties in part attributed to several high-profile projects not going to plan. After losses totalling £73.4 million were recorded in 2005, its construction services operation was restructured and 300 jobs were lost at the company. During December 2005, it was announced that rival contracting company Carillion was acquiring Mowlem for £291 million. Use of the Mowlem name was discontinued soon thereafter.

However, in 2024, the Mowlem trademark was acquired by BHM Construction International UK Ltd from the administrators of Carillion. BHM Construction International UK Ltd subsequently started trading as Mowlem.

== History ==
The firm was founded as John Mowlem and Co by the stonemason John Mowlem in London in 1822. The company undertook a variety of jobs across London throughout the mid-nineteenth century; early activities were centred around paving and roadworks at the behest of various local authorities. The business was able to expand considerably towards the end of the century, permitting it to perform prestigious activities, such as its involvement in preparatory works at Westminster Abbey for the Diamond Jubilee of Queen Victoria in 1887. During 1902, the company received a Royal Warrant from the Prince of Wales in recognition of the quality of its workmanship; additional warrants would be received in 1910 and 1920.

By this time, John Mowlem and Co. had become a partnership that was operated by successive generations of the Mowlem and Burt families, including George Burt and John Mowlem Burt. George Mowlem Burt, a civil engineer and grandson of George Burt, has been credited with successfully guiding the company through the construction of various large scale public works, including the Admiralty Arch and the Port of London Authority Building, as well as various maintenance contracts on behalf of the Office of Works, amongst others. The company was briefly incorporated during 1903, but reverted to being a private company in 1908. During 1924, the company went public on the London Stock Exchange.

During the Second World War, the company's reputation from its works during the interwar period led to it being awarded numerous contracts from the British government. One particularly high-profile project that it was a contractor upon was the construction of the Mulberry harbour units. Other wartime construction projects included the Royal Ordnance Factory Swynnerton as well as numerous tunnels and runways; the associated contracts were collectively valued at £29 million.

Having developed itself as a long-standing national contractor, Mowlem developed a network of regional contracting businesses including Rattee and Kett of Cambridge (bought in 1926); E. Thomas of the west country (bought in 1965) and the formation of a northern region based in Leeds in 1970. This network was further augmented by the acquisition of Ernest Ireland of Bath during 1977, as well as the purchase of McTay Engineering of Bromborough together with its shipbuilding subsidiary McTay Marine during the late 1970s.

During 1971, the company expanded overseas via the purchase of a 40% shareholding in the Australian contractor Barclay Brothers, in which it later took total ownership of. The Australian business, re-branded Barclay Mowlem, expanded into all other Australian mainland states, except South Australia, as well into Asia. In 1982, the parent company was re-registered as John Mowlem and Co. plc.

During 1986, Mowlem acquired the scaffolding specialist SGB Group; its purchase of Unit Construction that same year gave the company a substantial presence in the private house building sector. Within two years, sales were up to an annual rate of 1,200 homes. However, a recession during the early 1990s led to Mowlem incurring losses in excess of £180m between 1991 and 1993, which placed pressure upon its banking covenants that compelled it to respond. During 1994, the company divested itself of its housing division via its sale to the rival homebuilder Beazer. The company also opted to sell off SGB during the late 1990s.

In 1984, a joint venture between Mowlem and GEC was awarded a contract to deliver the Docklands Light Railway (DLR), a fully automated transport system using light rail vehicles serving the redeveloped Docklands area of London. Over the next two decades, the DLR would prove to be quite lucrative for Mowlem. In 1993 Mowlem sold HSS Hire.

During the mid-2000s, Mowlem entered into a period of financial difficulties; in 2005 alone, it issued four separate profit warnings and recorded losses totalling £73.4 million. Several projects undertaken by the firm, such as the Spinnaker Tower in Portsmouth and the Bath Spa, had encountered considerable difficulties. Simon Vivian, the company's chief executive, ordered a financial review of its ongoing projects along with the restructuring of its construction services operation, splitting it into three divisions (Mowlem Building, Mowlem Infrastructure and Mowlem Engineering) and enacting roughly 300 job losses.

During December 2005, it was announced that rival construction company Carillion was set to acquire Mowlem in exchange for £291 million. The two companies were considered to be a good fit for one another, both having heavily involved themselves in various private finance initiative (PFI) schemes, taking on various responsibilities and functions traditionally performed by national governments. After the acquisition was completed, Mowlem ceased to exist as an entity, having been absorbed into Carillion's operations. Carillion's management publicly expressed the view that the Mowlem acquisition had led to some difficulties for the company.

The Mowlem trade mark was acquired by BHM Construction International UK Ltd in 2024 from the administrators of Carillion. BHM Construction International UK Ltd subsequently started trading as Mowlem.

== Major projects ==
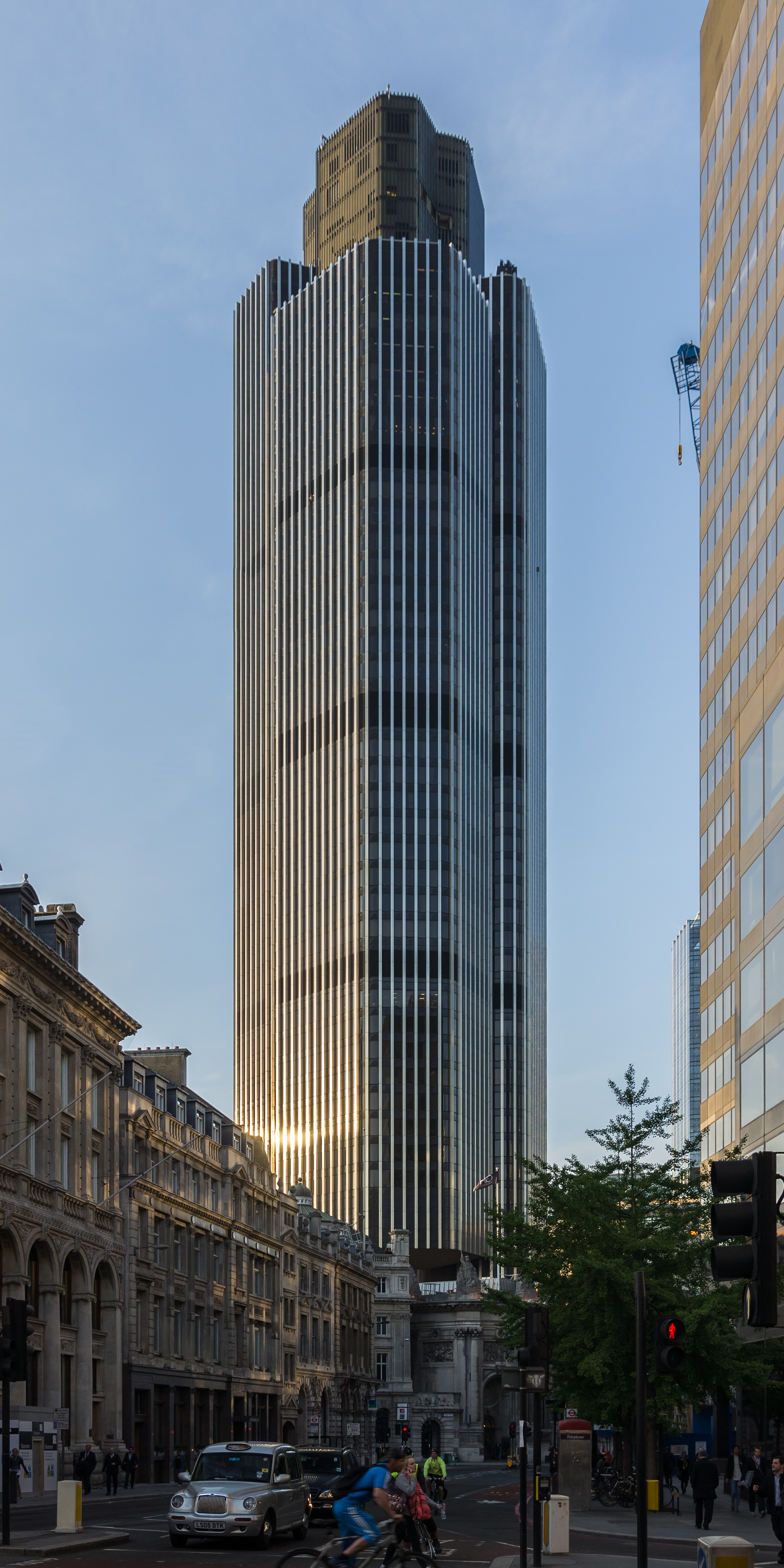
Tower 42 built by Mowlem

Major projects undertaken by or involving Mowlem included:

- Billingsgate Fish Market completed in 1874
- Clerkenwell Road completed in 1878
- Smithfield Fruit Market completed in 1882
- Imperial Institute completed in 1887
- Woolwich Ferry terminals opened in 1889
- Liverpool Street station and the Great Eastern Hotel completed in 1891
- Institution of Civil Engineers building completed in 1911
- Admiralty Arch completed in 1912
- Port of London Authority Building completed in 1919
- Bush House completed in 1923
- London Post Office Railway completed in 1927
- Piccadilly Circus tube station completed in 1928
- Battersea Power Station completed in 1933
- Mulberry harbour units completed in 1943
- Reconstruction works at Buckingham Palace in 1943 following bomb damage
- Reconstruction of the House of Commons in 1947 also following bomb damage
- William Girling Reservoir completed in 1951
- Hunterston A nuclear power station completed in 1957
- Strand underpass completed in 1962
- Millbank Tower completed in 1963
- Reconstruction of 10 Downing Street in 1963
- Marine terminal for a joint venture of Esso and Pappas Petroleum in Thessaloniki completed in 1965
- New altar for Westminster Abbey in 1966
- London Bridge completed in 1972
- Heathrow tube extension and Heathrow Terminals 2 & 3 tube station, completed in 1977
- Natwest Tower completed in 1979
- Mount Pleasant Airfield completed in 1986
- Docklands Light Railway completed in 1987
- Manchester Metrolink completed in 1991
- Refurbishment of Thames House completed in 1994
- Refurbishment of the Albert Memorial completed in 1998
- Expansion of James Cook University Hospital completed in 2003
- Spinnaker Tower completed in 2005
- Twickenham Stadium South Stand completed in 2006
- Dublin Port Tunnel completed in 2006

Mowlem was also the owner and developer of London City Airport completed in 1986.

== See also ==
- John Mowlem - Biography of the founder of the company
- George Burt - Biography of his successor as manager of the company
- Edgar Beck - Biography of chairman then president between 1961-2000
- Frank Baines History of John Mowlem unpublished typescript history held at London Metropolitan Archives
