= List of companies based in Greater Manchester =

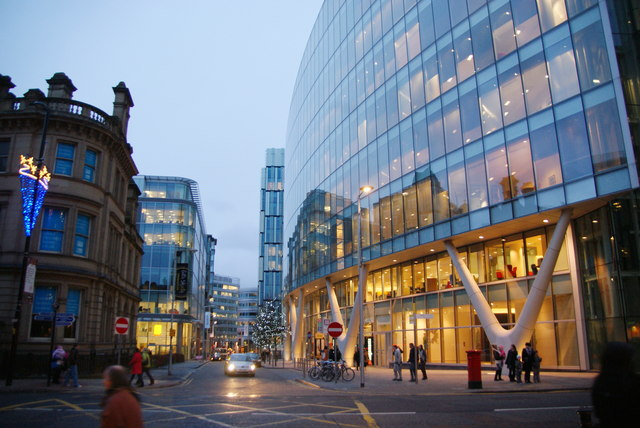
Manchester has the largest office-based work sector in the United Kingdom outside London. Many of these office jobs are based in Manchester city centre and Salford Quays.

Greater Manchester is home to a wide range of companies that operate across the United Kingdom and internationally. The city has a highly diversified economy and is a centre for cultural industries, retail, transport, logistics, and the financial, legal and manufacturing sectors.

Many companies maintain a regional base in Manchester—serving Greater Manchester, North West England or Northern England. Several globally trading firms are headquartered in the city, including PZ Cussons, the Co-operative Group, Umbro and the Peel Group. International companies such as Kellogg's, Adidas and Siemens have their UK headquarters in Manchester, along with various warehouse and manufacturing facilities across the Greater Manchester region.

== List of companies ==
Company (bold denotes global trading company)	Country of origin	Borough	Type of base	Notes
**2ergo**	UK	Manchester	Global head office	Part of Eagle Eye
**Adidas**	Germany	Stockport and Trafford	National head office	National office in Stockport and national warehouse located at Trafford Park
**AJ Bell**	UK	Salford	Head office	Office in Salford Quays
**Amazon (company)**	US	Manchester	Regional head office	Office based in Hanover Building, opposite Manchester Victoria
**Apadmi**	UK	Salford	Head office	Located in Salford Quays
**Arup**	UK	Manchester	Regional office	Based at St James Buildings from 1958 until 2015; before moving to 3 Piccadilly Place
Autotrader	UK	Manchester	National head office	Based at No 3 Circle Square with approximately 1,200 staff
BA CityFlyer	UK	Manchester	National head office	Regional airline; a wholly owned subsidiary of British Airways, based at Pioneer House in Didsbury
Banter Media	UK	Tameside	National head office	Based in Ashton-under-Lyne
Barclays	UK	Manchester	Regional office	Based at 4 Piccadilly Place since 2014
Barclays Wealth	UK	Manchester	Regional office	Based at 3 Hardman Street
BBC	UK	Salford	Regional head office	National television broadcaster; MediaCityUK in Salford Quays for its North operations
Begbies Traynor	UK	Manchester	Global head office	International accounting firm specialising in corporate restructuring
Betfred	UK	Manchester	National head office	
BNY Mellon	UK	Manchester	National head office	Based at 1 New York Street
Bosch	Germany	Stockport	Regional office	Automotive Service Solutions business unit based in Orion Business Park
Britannia Hotels	UK	Trafford	National head office	
Brother Industries	Japan	Manchester	European head office	Office based in Audenshaw
Bruntwood	UK	Manchester	National head office	
Building Design Partnership	UK	Manchester	Regional head office	
Co-operative Group	UK	Manchester	National head office	Based at an eight-building complex in Manchester city centre which includes the CIS Tower and One Angel Square
DAC Beachcroft	UK	Manchester	Regional office	Based at 3 Hardman Street
**Deloitte**	UK	Manchester	Regional office	
EpicEdits	UK	Manchester	Regional office	
Fast Web Media	UK	Manchester	National head office	
First Greater Manchester	UK	Oldham	Head office	Part of FirstGroup
**Gazprom**	Russia	Manchester	National head office	Fourth-largest gas supplier for UK businesses
**Google**	US	Manchester	Regional head office	Based at Peter House, Oxford Street established in 2005, only Google office outside London in the UK
Guardian Media Group	UK	Manchester	Regional office	Publisher of The Guardian and The Observer newspapers
Henri Lloyd	UK	Manchester	Global head office	
Hilti	LI	Manchester	Regional head office	
Hydes	UK	Manchester	National head office	
In Touch Networks	UK	Manchester	Global head office	
Inc & Co	UK	Manchester	Head office	
incspaces	UK	Manchester	Head office	
ITV Granada	UK	Salford	Head office	Based at Orange Building, MediaCityUK
ITV Studios	UK	Trafford and Salford	Joint head office	
JJB Sports	UK	Wigan	Head office	
Joseph Holt's Brewery	UK	Manchester	National head office	
**Kellogg's**	US	Trafford	National head office and factory	Mentioned on Inside the Factory about cereal
Kitbag	UK	Manchester	Global head office	
**KPMG**	UK	Manchester	Regional office	Based at One St Peter's Square
Landis+Gyr	Switzerland	Stockport	Regional office	
LateRooms	UK	Salford	National head office	
Leonard Curtis	UK	Manchester	National head office	
Manchester Airports Group	UK	Manchester	National head office	Group owns and operates Manchester, Stansted, Bournemouth and East Midlands Airports
Manchester Building Society	UK	Manchester	Head office	
Manchester City F.C.	UK	Manchester	Head office	Employs over 800 people
Manchester United F.C.	UK	Manchester	Head office	Most successful club in English Football
Marks & Spencer	UK	Manchester, Salford	Regional office and departmental	Based at 3 Hardman Street and Salford Quays; human resources and financial administration division
McVitie's	UK	Manchester	Regional head office and factory	
N Brown Group	UK	Manchester	National head office	
National Car Parks	UK	Manchester	Regional head office	
Network Rail	UK	Manchester	Regional office	Owns and operates Manchester Piccadilly and has offices adjacent to the station; North West rail management centre based at Ardwick adjacent to Ashburys railway station
Nexperia	Netherlands	Stockport	National head office	
Northern Trains	UK	Manchester	Regional office	Operates train services in Greater Manchester; operates many train stations in Greater Manchester, including Manchester Victoria, the second-busiest station in Manchester
Outsourcery	UK	Manchester	Head office	
Pannone	UK	Manchester	National head office	
Patak's	UK	Wigan	Head office	
Peel Group	UK	Trafford	Global head office	One of the largest property companies in the UK
PH Media Group	UK	Trafford	Global head office	The world's largest audio branding agency
PG Tips	UK	Trafford	National head office	Nanufactured at Brook Bond factory in Trafford Park
Pinsent Masons	UK	Manchester	Regional office	Based at 3 Hardman Street
PZ Cussons	UK	Manchester	Global head office	
Red Production Company	UK	Salford	Head office	Based at MediaCityUK
Regatta	UK	Trafford	Head office	
Renaker	UK	Manchester	Head office	
Renovo	UK	Manchester	Global head office	
**Royal Bank of Scotland**	UK	Manchester	Regional head office	Based at 3 Hardman Street and 38 and 42 Mosley Street
RSM UK	UK	Manchester	Regional office	Based at 3 Hardman Street
**Siemens**	Germany	Manchester	Regional head office departmental	Siemens Industry Automation and Drive Technologies office is based at Siemens House in Withington; Siemens also operates a large train depot in Ardwick, east Manchester on approach to Manchester Piccadilly station
**SimpsonHaugh**	UK	Manchester	Global head office	
Sky UK	UK	Salford	Regional head office	National television broadcaster
Stagecoach Manchester	UK	Manchester	Head office	Part of Stagecoach Group
Swinton Colonnade	UK	Manchester	National head office	
The Tote	UK	Wigan	National head office	
**THG plc**	UK	Manchester	Global head office	Icon Technology Campus at Manchester Airport
TransPennine Express	UK	Manchester	National head office	Based at Bridgewater House
UKFast	UK	Manchester	National head office	
Umbro	UK	Manchester	Global head office	
Urban Splash	UK	Manchester	National head office	
VoxelStorm	UK	Manchester	Head office	
Warburtons	UK	Bolton	Head office	
The Warehouse Project	UK	Manchester	Head office	
We Are Nomads	UK	Manchester	Head office	
**Williams & Glyn**	UK	Manchester	Global head office	

- Abbey Business Centres
- Britannia Hotels
- Co-operative Group
  - Co-operative Bank
  - Co-operative Financial Services
  - Co-operative Insurance Society
- ISOFT
- JJB Sports
- LateRooms
- Manchester Building Society
- Marble Brewery
- Mayne Coaches
- Texet Sales
- United Utilities
- Urban Splash

== Companies with other bases of significant importance in Manchester and Greater Manchester ==
- Direct Line – Quay Street, Manchester city centre
- Guardian Media Group – Manchester city centre
- Heinz – Wigan produce over two million cans of food every day including soup and baked beans
- Highways Agency – City Tower, Manchester city centre
- RAC – Breakdown Control Centre, Business Solutions; Aviva Motoring Centre of Excellence, Stretford

== See also ==
- Economy of Manchester
- Lists of companies
