= ECI Partners =

Private equity group

- Industry: Private equity
- Founded: 1976; 50 years ago
- Headquarters: London, Manchester and New York
- Products: Private equity funds, buyouts
- Number of employees: +50 (2024)
- Website: www.ecipartners.com

ECI Partners is a private equity group based in the UK and the US, first established by the Bank of England in 1976.

ECI typically invests up to £200m of equity (as part of an initial transaction) in businesses valued at up to £350m across a number of subsectors, such as Cloud & Digital, Data, Financial Services, GRC, HealthTech, HR & Edtech, and Travel.

It was a founder member of both the European Venture Capital Association (now "Invest Europe") and British Private Equity and Venture Capital Association ("BVCA") in 1983 having organised its first management buyout (for Ansafone) in 1980. Early investments included Williams Holdings – owner of Chubb and Kidde – founded by Nigel Rudd and Brian McGowan, Shanks & McEwan, National Express and Bloomsbury Publishing.

The turn of the millennium saw ECI raise their seventh fund (ECI7 - £175m) with leading growth investments including Thinkmoney and LateRooms (sold for a 9x return on investment).

In September 2023, ECI announced the final close of its twelfth buyout fund, ECI 12, hitting its £1 billion hard cap, beating a £900 million target.

== Investments ==
In September 2026, ECI invested in Shaw Gibbs, a top 35 practice which supports private individuals, entrepreneurial businesses, public sector/non-profit organisations and international groups with tailored accounting, tax and advisory services. In May 2026, ECI invested in Helio Intelligence, a provider of AI-enabled political intelligence and public affairs monitoring services, formerly known as DeHavilland.

February 2026 marked the next step for ECI by investing for the first time outside of the UK and Ireland, acquiring Paragin Group. Paragin Group is based in The Netherlands and focuses on e-assessments and high-stakes education processes. Paragin was acquired by ECI Partners from Dutch PE firm Main Capital for an undisclosed amount.

In November 2024, ECI invested in CMap, a market leading provider of professional services automation software, and Insurance Insider, a leading digital platform providing insight and analysis for the world’s top insurers, distributors, service providers and investors. In October 2024, ECI invested in both Croud, a global, full-service digital marketing company, and Independent Governance Group, the UK’s leading provider of professional pensions trusteeship and governance services. In April 2024, ECI acquired London-based global travel management company TAG, from Apiary Capital for an undisclosed amount.

In November 2023, ECI invested in ISMS.online, a UK data privacy and information security compliance software and service provider. In September 2023, ECI acquired Commify, a business messaging platform, from Hg Capital Trust for a sum of €300 million.

In June 2022, ECI acquired BCN Group, a UK-based cloud and IT managed services company, from Beech Tree Private Equity

Earlier investments have included CIPHR, Mobysoft, CSL, KB Associates, Peoplesafe, Travel Chapter, Moneypenny, 4Ways, Arkessa, The Clear Group, Bionic, Content+Cloud, Imagesound (a leading supplier of audio and screen media), Tusker, Investis Digital, Auction Technology Group, and Avantia, an online home insurance company that trades under the HomeProtect brand.

== Exits ==
In January 2026, ECI exited Peoplesafe, a global provider of workforce safety software, to Summa Equity, generating a return of 2.7x on its initial investment in 2018. ECI retains a minority stake in the business.

In October 2025, ECI exited CSL Group, a European leader in critical IoT connectivity, generating a return of 3.5x, via its first-ever continuation vehicle.

In February 2023, ECI sold Tusker to Lloyds Banking Group, for a value of c.£300m, generating a return of 6.2x.

In September 2022, ECI realised its investment in MiQ, delivering a 6.1x return in a deal valued at a reported $900m. ECI originally backed the founders (Gurman Hundal and Lee Puri) in a minority investment in 2017 with MiQ growing to $45m of profit in the year before ECI exited.

in June 2022, ECI sold The Clear Group, an insurance broking platform, to Goldman Sachs Asset Management having tripled Gross Written Premium to over £330m during the four year investment.

In October 2021, ECI sold CPOMS, a provider of safeguarding software to schools, based in Skipton, England, to US firm Raptor Technologies.

In February 2021, ECI announced the IPO of its portfolio company Auction Technology Group on the London Stock Exchange where it became a member of the FTSE250.

In November 2020, ECI exited MPM generating a return of 4.4x.

In February 2020, ECI exited both Encore Tickets, sold to TodayTix and Auction Technology Group, in a secondary buyout delivering 3.7x money whilst also reinvesting in the latter from its most recent fund.

ECI exited mthree in December 2019, selling to Wiley (publisher) and generating a return of over 100% IRR.

In June 2018 ECI announced the sale of Great Rail Journeys, generating a 3.6x return.

In June 2017 ECI sold Kelvin Hughes to Hensoldt, (formerly Airbus Defence Electronics), which generated a 3.3x return.

In February 2017 ECI announced the sale of Clarke Energy to Kohler Co for a reported £300m.

The sale of Reed & Mackay (premium corporate travel company) in August 2016 was ECI's 100th exit since 1990, and generated a multiple of 3.4x cost to investors.

In February 2016, ECI sold Citation, a provider of HR, employment law, and health & safety solutions to 16,000 SMEs, to HGCapital for a reported £185m. generating a 5.4x return on its investment.

In June 2015 it sold Fourth Hospitality, a restaurant management software firm to Insight Venture Partners.

In February 2015 ECI sold Wireless Logic, an M2M managed service provider, to CVC Capital Partners generating 6.1x money return.

In October 2014 ECI sold XLN Telecom to the company's management and Blackstone's credit business GSO Capital Partners generating a 3x return on its investment.

In March 2014 ECI sold CarTrawler to BC Partners for a reported €450m, returning 6x money to investors.

In February 2014 ECI sold M2 Digital to The Rigby Group through its technology brand SCC (Specialist Computer Centres).

ECI sold healthcare IT company Ascribe to AIM-listed clinical software supplier EMIS Health Group in September 2013 generating a 2.1x return.

== ECI Growth Survey ==
The ECI Growth Survey is the only survey in the UK focused exclusively on growth companies. It was launched in 2010 to give owners and directors of growth companies an opportunity to voice their opinion and influence the economic debate. A number of influential figures have been involved in the survey over the years including Mark Prisk, Karan Bilimoria, Baron Bilimoria, Howard Davies, Sir Danny Alexander, Carolyn Fairbairn, Sir John Timpson, and most recently Philip Shaw, Chief Economist at Investec.

== Founding of the Firm ==
ECI's origins lie in the founding of "Equity Capital for Industry" in 1976 under a Bank of England initiative. The initial board of directors consisted of: Lord Plowden (chair), A. W. P. Stenham (Finance Director of Unilever), Lord Seebohm (chair of Finance for Industry which became 3i), Sir Jack Callard (former chair of ICI), Anthony Touche (chair of Touche, Remnant), Alfred Singer (Managing Director of National Giro), Leonard Hall (General Manager of Clerical Medical and General Life Assurance), Trevor Holdsworth (Deputy Chair, GKN), Ernest Bigland (vice chair of Guardian Royal Exchange), Peter Moody (joint investment manager, the Prudential), John Rodgers (deputy chair, CIBA-Geigy which merged to become Norvatis), Anthony Simon (chair of Target Trust Group)
