= Eurocamp =

British holiday company, founded 1973

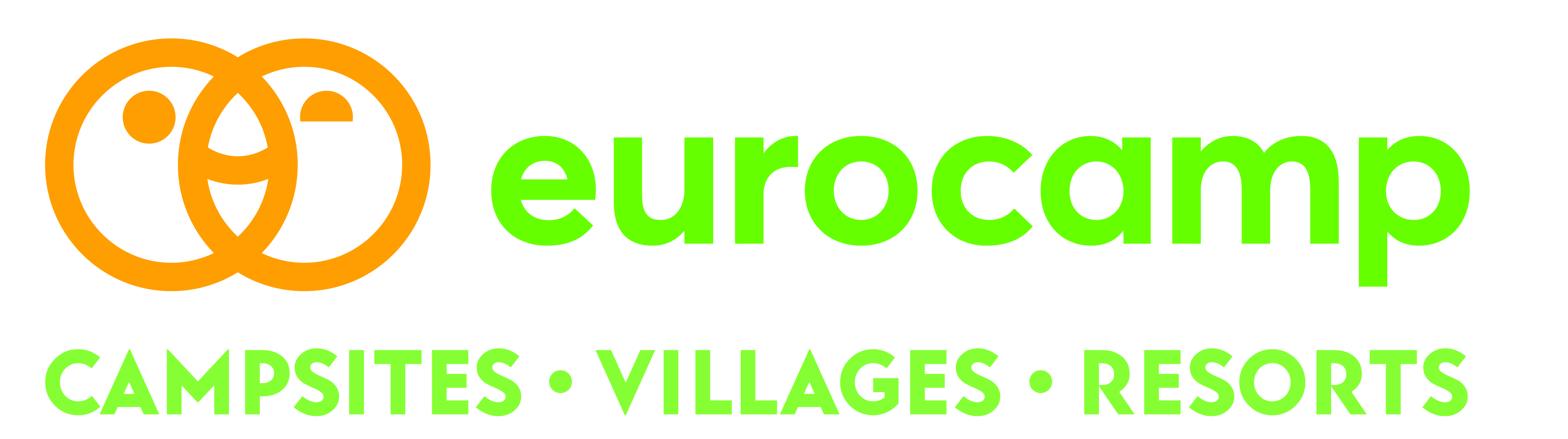
- Type: Private
- Industry: Leisure
- Founded: 1973
- Founder: Alan Goulding
- Headquarters: Hartford, Cheshire
- Website: eurocamp.co.uk

Eurocamp is a British holiday company based in Cheshire that sells pre-sited outdoor holidays across Europe. The company works with third-party partner campsites and holiday villages to offer beach, city, and countryside holidays at more than 400 parcs. This includes destinations in France, Italy, Spain, Portugal, the Netherlands, Austria, Switzerland, Germany, Luxembourg, Croatia and Slovenia. As part of their holiday packages, Eurocamp provides additional services, such as kids' clubs.

== History ==
=== Formation ===
Founded in 1973 by Alan Goulding in Knutsford, Cheshire, Eurocamp Travel Ltd sold pre-sited tent holidays at a single campsite in Brittany.

In 1981, Goulding sold the family-run business to the retail group Combined English Stores, which was subsequently acquired by Next plc in 1987. Throughout the 1980s, Eurocamp added additional locations and introduced mobile home accommodation products.

In 1987, Eurocamp launched Eurocamp Independent, where vacationers bring their own camping equipment and motorhomes but use other Eurocamp amenities.

Following a management buy-out in 1988, Eurocamp PLC was floated on the London Stock Exchange in 1991.

=== Expansion ===
During the mid-1990s, Eurocamp expanded through several acquisitions outside the camping holiday sector, including the 1995 merger with Superbreak.

In 1998, Eurocamp plc acquired Keycamp Holidays and changed its name to Holidaybreak plc. By that time, competitors Sunsites and French Country Camping had also been acquired. Airtours' camping product Eurosites was purchased in 2002. By then, few competitors remained, with Haven being the largest.

In 2011, global travel company Cox & Kings bought Holidaybreak plc, with Eurocamp the main part of its camping division. In 2014, Eurocamp was purchased by Homair Vacances Group.

Homair rebranded to European Camping Group (ECG) in 2017. ECG acquired Vacanceselect Group in 2023 including the Canvas Holidays brand. In 2026, after three years as sister companies, Canvas Holidays united fully with Eurocamp.

In July 2025, ECG acquired Alannia Resorts, adding numerous sites on the Costa Blanca and Costa Dorada.

As of 2025, there were over 400 Eurocamp resorts in Europe.
