= Pressnell =

Pressnell is a surname. Notable people with the surname include:

- Leslie Pressnell (1922–2011), British monetary historian
- Tot Pressnell (1906–2001), American baseball player

== See also ==
- Presnell
