= Surtout =

Kind of overcoat

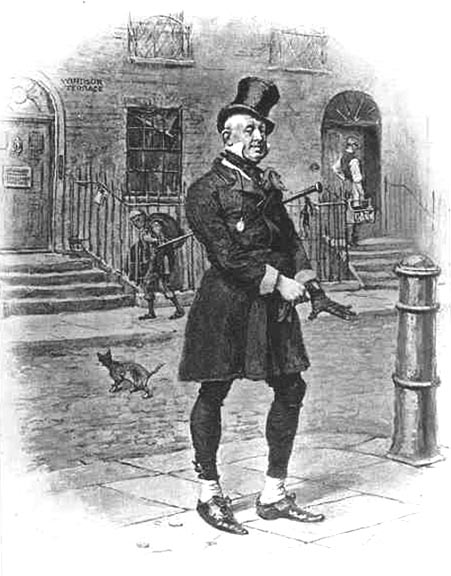
Wilkins Micawber, wearing a surtout with black tights

Surtout was a kind of overcoat. A "surtout" was a 17th-century term used to describe a coat worn over another coat, like a waistcoat. Surtout was a new name for it; prior to 1684, it was known as "Suravit" on account of Surhabit (overcoat).

Surtout is also a French term that translates as "above all."

== Variations ==
=== Newmarket surtout ===
Newmarket was a frock-styled overcoat. Newmarket Surtout was called after the city known for its horse races. The coat was worn while riding. It was styled with long skirted, double breasted and redingote cloak. The coat's collar was made of velvet.

=== Military surtout ===
During the late 18th and early 19th centuries plain dark blue or grey overcoats were authorised for British army officers to provide shelter in bad weather or conceal their conspicuous red coats when on active service. On the evening of 18 April 1775 the sight of groups of officers riding out of Boston "with their blue surtouts" alerted patriot observers to the commencement of the night march to Lexington and Concord which marked the outbreak of the American Revolution.

=== New York surtout ===
New York surtout was a fashionable version for men. It was a short overcoat that had a wide collar that extends to the waistline and is hemmed with a wide black silk braid.

== In popular culture ==
Charles Dickens refers to the character Mr. Micawber, who is wearing a surtout with black tights. Dickens also mentioned a surtout worn by a “sharp nosed, light haired man in a brown surtout reaching nearly to his heels” in “The Parlour Orator” from “Sketches by Boz”.

Herman Melville establishes a mysterious setting through repeated reference to clothing in his novella, "Benito Cereno." For example, Melville writes, "The sky seemed a gray surtout" to suggest that nature is wearing a disguise.

== See also ==
- Wraprascal
