= Marie Slater =

British reality television personality

Marie "Maz" Slater (born 1971 in Middleton, Greater Manchester) is a British reality TV star infamous for her role as the 'Miss Nasty' resort manager in Faliraki in ITV show Club Reps.

== Club Reps ==
Simply known as "Maz" to viewers, she first rose to promise in January 2002 when the first episode of the show was aired, becoming a huge tabloid star overnight. She was instantly described as the "middle manager from hell" by the UK press. However following the end of the first series, Slater was left devastated at the way producers had "falsely edited" the show to make her appear moody and nasty, saying "The producers didn't use any nice bits at all."

However bookings for Club 18-30 holidays soared after each episode aired and this was referred to as "the Maz effect".

She quit the show after the first series and despite picking out 25 new recruits to return to Greece in the summer of 2002 she returned to the UK.

== Later career ==
Slater then continued work with Thomas Cook and had a short stint as presenter on their television show on Sky. Slater said her TV image proved hard for the public to forget and the negative effects were long lasting with one girl trying to attack her and the only way to get back to 'Marie' was "to leave the industry behind."

However in an interview in 2007, Slater revealed she had plans to return to life as a TV presenter and had received numerous offers which she was still considering. She stated that despite the distress Club Reps had caused her (she had counselling upon returning to England and later went into hiding) that she was grateful for the fact it had opened many doors and hopes to follow in the footsteps of Jeremy Spake and Jane McDonald.

In a 2006 interview, Slater claimed "reality TV ruined my life" and also said "It's such a weight off my shoulders to finally leave Maz behind and I'd really like people to finally realise I'm nothing at all like the character reality TV made of me."

Slater now owns a restaurant-bar called H. Nicholsons in Altrincham which opened in February 2006 and has continued work as a presenter, most notably on Sky Travel. The restaurant is themed around the resort of Faliraki with the entertainment centred on Club Reps.
