= 3 Hardman Street =

High-rise building in Manchester, England

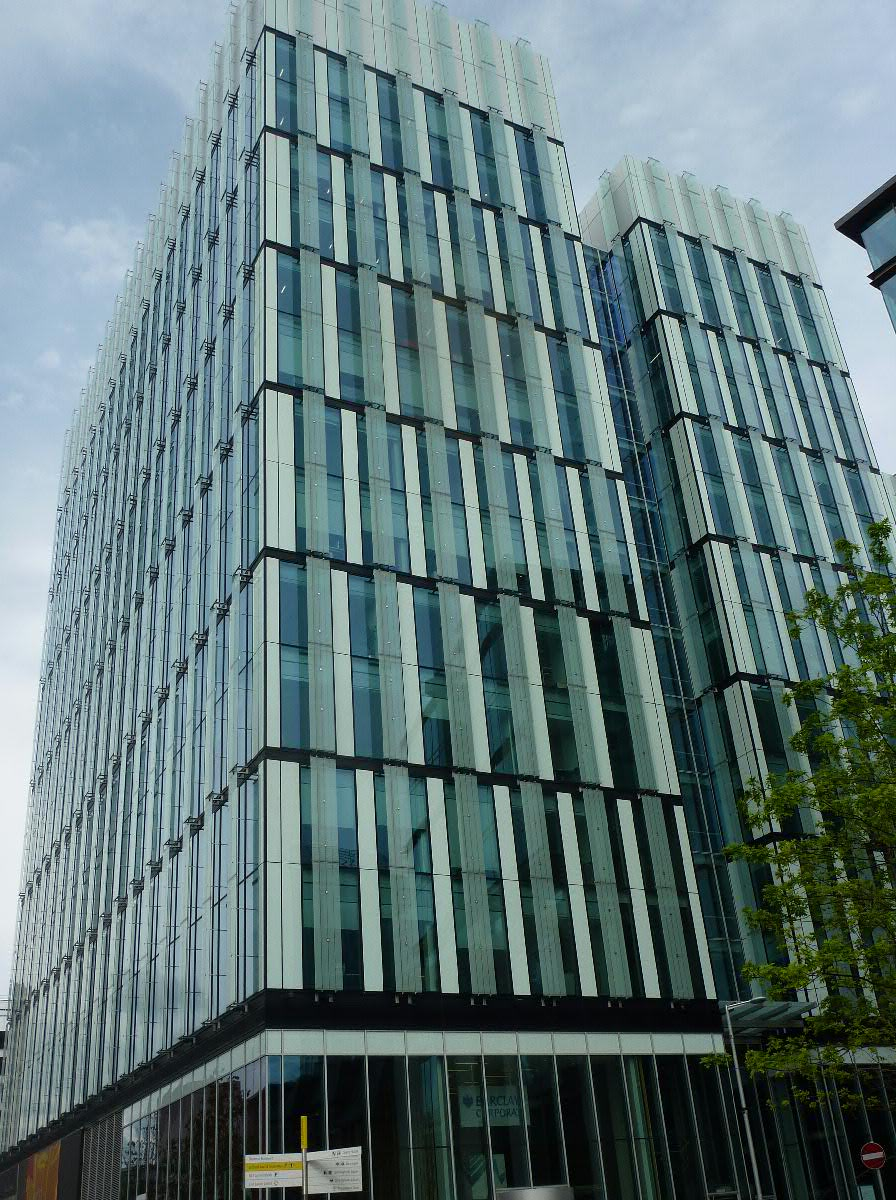
- 3 Hardman Street

General information
- Type: Office; Retail
- Location: 3 Hardman Street, Manchester, England, UK
- Coordinates: 53.4797°N 2.2503°W
- Construction started: 2007
- Completed: 2009
- Operator: Capital Properties

Height
- Roof: 75 m (246 ft)

Technical details
- Floor count: 16
- Floor area: 369,800 sq ft (34,360 m^{2})
- Lifts/elevators: 20

Design and construction
- Architect: Sheppard Robson
- Developer: Allied London Properties
- Structural engineer: Capita Symonds
- Main contractor: Bovis Lend Lease

3 Hardman Street is a 16-storey high-rise building in Spinningfields, Manchester, England. At 75 m (246 ft), as of 2023 it is the third-tallest building in the Spinningfields area (after 1 Spinningfields and the Manchester Civil Justice Centre) and the joint 36th-tallest building in Greater Manchester.

Its nearest airport is Manchester Airport, located 8.7 miles away; the nearest train station is Deansgate, located 0.4 miles away; and the nearest bus stop is Cheapside (Stop CO), which is located 0.3 miles away.

== Background ==
3 Hardman Street was designed by architects Sheppard Robson, as part of the Allied London project regenerating Spinningfields into a major business centre. According to Allied London chief executive Mike Ingall, "3 Hardman Street has been designed in particular for the financial and professional services sector for Manchester".

The building was completed in February 2009, and it was the largest speculatively developed office outside London at the time. (A speculative development is construction with no formal commitment from tenants). The building was 80% let before completion. The building has a BREEAM rating of excellent. The building is 16-storeys tall with one floor used as a plant floor. The building also has two underground levels which hold 250 parking spaces.

In 2010, Allied London sold the building for £183.5 million. It was bought by Glenn Arrow UK Property, which is owned by the Luxembourg-based company, Ærium. Allied London continues to manage the building.

== Tenants ==
- BDO Global
- Beachcroft
- BNY Mellon
- Brown Shipley
- Equinox Financial Search and Selection
- G2V Recruitment Group
- General Medical Council
- Investec
- Kukinto
- Marks & Spencer
- Pinsent Masons
- PKF
- PureGym
- Regus
- Robert Walters Group
- RSM UK
- Shoosmiths
