= Red coat =

Red coat, Redcoat or Redcoats may refer to:

== Entertainment ==
- Red Coat (Pretty Little Liars), a fictional character
- Red Coats (film), the English title for Giubbe rosse an Italian film
- Redcoats (play), a 2019 play about holiday camps
- Redcoats (TV series), a series on the lives of Butlins Redcoats
- Redcoats (Australian band), a rock band in Melbourne, Australia
- The Redcoats (American band), an American rock band
- Georgia Redcoat Marching Band, of the University of Georgia
- Redcoat (novel), a 1987 novel by Bernard Cornwell

== Military ==
- Redshirts (Italy), volunteer soldiers headed by Garibaldi during Risorgimento
- Red coat (military uniform), a uniform worn historically by most infantry and some cavalry regiments of the British Army
- Red Serge, a ceremonial tunic worn by members of the Royal Canadian Mounted Police

== Other ==
- Redcoats (Butlins), members of the staff at Butlins holiday camps in the UK
- Redcoat Air Cargo, a British cargo airline from 1976 to 1982
- Ohio Valley Redcoats, a minor league baseball team
- The common name for Utricularia menziesii, an Australian carnivorous plant

== See also ==
- Redshirt (disambiguation)
