= Butlins Redcoats =

Name given to frontline staff at Butlins holiday camps in the United Kingdom

Redcoats
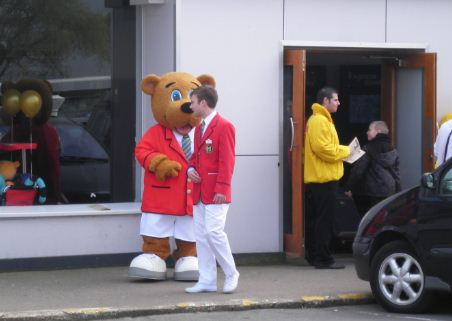

Occupation
- Occupation type: Employment, performing arts
- Activity sectors: Entertainment, event management

Description
- Competencies: Singing, dancing, acting
- Fields of employment: Holiday camp

Redcoat is the name given to frontline staff at Butlin's holiday camps in the United Kingdom. A Redcoat has duties ranging from adult entertainer or children's entertainer to stewarding.

== History ==
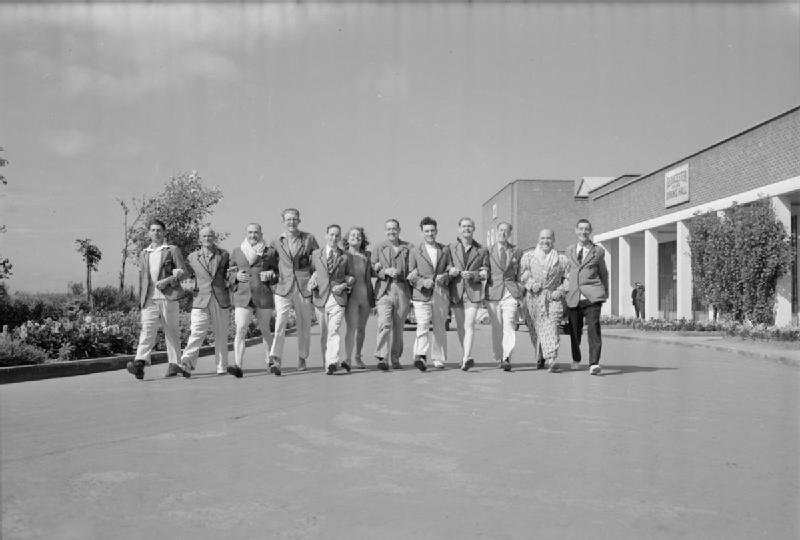
Redcoats at Butlins Filey in 1947. All but the figure second from the right are redcoats.

The first Redcoat was Norman Bradford. When Sir Billy Butlin opened his first Butlin's in Skegness, he realised that his guests were not engaging with activities in the way he had envisioned: most kept to themselves, and others looked bored. He asked Bradford, who was engaged as an engineer, constructing the camp, to take on the duty of entertaining the guests, which he did with a series of icebreakers and jokes.

=== Uniform ===
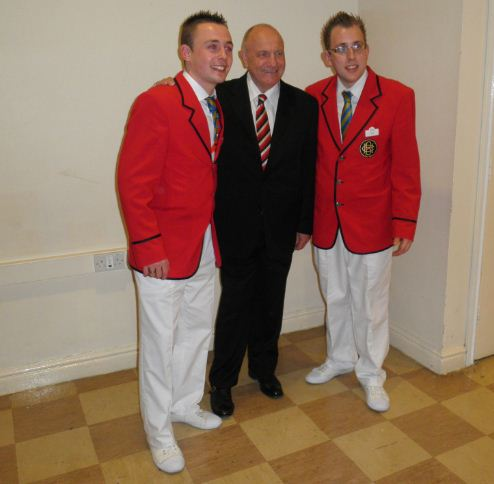
Redcoats with former England football player George Cohen, March 2011

Butlin asked Norman to purchase a uniform. Norman later returned with a jacket in the camp colours of blue, primrose yellow, and white; however, Butlin found the look to be too authoritarian and decided they should wear red blazers with white lapels, and this became the Redcoat uniform. The first uniforms were made by Billie Ditchfield, who became one of the first two female Redcoats (the other was Kay Berry).

Over the years, the uniform has changed several times, but has always retained the core component of a red blazer (despite a proposal to replace them with red jumpsuits in the 1970s). In the 1960s and 1970s, braid and badges were added to the blazers. Famous designers such as Jeff Banks and Zandra Rhodes have redesigned the uniforms.

To mark Butlins' 75th anniversary, the uniform was re-designed very similar to the original design, consisting of a red blazer with dark braiding and a badge with the letters "BHC" on it (standing for "Butlins Holiday Camps") with white trousers or a skirt. This uniform was worn throughout 2011 for the anniversary celebration, and from early 2016, it has once again become the permanent redcoat uniform.

=== Roles ===
Redcoats work in three areas: General duties, the Kid's Club, and the costume character team. General duties are similar to those of a seasonworker in a resort – Butlins even describe the role as "The Original Holiday Rep". In the evening, the Redcoats form part of the live entertainment team, starring in Gangshows and X Factor style game shows.

Throughout the years, Redcoats have been expected to lead ballroom dances, stage and judge competitions, and steward theatrical performances, as well as meet and greet guests in public areas. Redcoats run the children's clubs, which provide sporting activities, competitions, and arts and crafts. Each Redcoat will have many different roles to fulfill in any given week.

== Similar staff ==
Butlins has remained the largest holiday camp chain in the UK, but smaller camps operate similarly to the Redcoat style of staffing. In the 1960s, Fred Pontin adopted the Bluecoat to represent at Pontins holiday camps, and at some point, Harry Warner decided Warners' holiday camps should adopt the Greencoat.

== Media appearances ==
The ITV series Redcoats was a docusoap following the lives of Redcoats at Butlins Minehead and Bognor resorts. Over three series of 30-minute episodes, it shows the selection process, the Redcoats entertaining the visitors, and life behind the scenes. The series was made by Pilgrim Productions.

=== In fiction ===
The BBC television series Hi-de-Hi!, written by former Butlins employees Jimmy Perry (a Redcoat) and David Croft (a summer show actor), featured the Yellowcoats as a fictional analogue. The title of the show "Hi-de-Hi" originated with Norman Bradford who claimed to have taken it from an American film; he began using this as a cheer to which the audience spontaneously responded "Ho-de-ho".

Another BBC television series, Doctor Who, featured a 3-part serial entitled "Delta and the Bannermen", which depicted an alien attack on the fictitious Shangri-La holiday camp (in reality, the Butlins camp at Barry Island). As with the real camp, Shangri-La was staffed with Redcoats played by extras.

In the film adaptation of The Who's rock opera Tommy (directed by Ken Russell), Tommy's stepfather Frank (portrayed by Oliver Reed) becomes acquainted with Tommy's widowed mother (Ann-Margret) during his employ as a Greencoat at the fictional Bernie's Holiday Camp.

The Butlins Girls by Elaine Everest is predominantly set at the Skegness camp in 1946, the first year of its re-opening after the war. It features the fictional Redcoats Molly Missons, Bunty Grainger, Plum Appleby, and Johnny Johnson.

There is also a children's book from the 1960s by Frank Richards called Billy Bunter at Butlins. In this book, there is a Redcoat known as Freddie, and Billy Butlin himself appears.

== Notable former Redcoats ==
Several entertainers have been Redcoats in the early stages of their careers. Becoming a Redcoat is seen as a way into show business, as it allows a performer to become established as a professional for the purposes of joining the Equity trade union, which then allows the performer to work freely throughout the industry. In exceptional cases, a Redcoat may even become notable while in the employment of Butlins; Stephen Mulhern notably performed on the Royal Variety Performance in 1997 while still working as a Redcoat,, and in the past, notable singers have had chart hits. Clinton Ford, for instance, reached number 27 in 1959 with "Old Shep" just after completing his final summer season at Pwllheli. However, before this, in 1957, Russ Hamilton recorded a UK number 2 hit, "We Will Make Love" (held off the top spot by Elvis Presley's "All Shook Up"). Shortly after this, he recorded a number 4 US Billboard hit, "Rainbow", during which Hamilton continued to entertain Butlins guests. It was Billy Butlin himself who asked Hamilton to record "We Will Make Love" for the benefit of Butlin's guests.

Other artists have gone on to find success building on the skills they learned as a Redcoat, such as Des O'Connor, Jimmy Tarbuck, and Michael Barrymore.

The writer P. J. Kavanagh also did a stint as a Redcoat, and described his experiences in his book The Perfect Stranger (1966).

Other famous Redcoats include Ted Rogers, a comedian best known as the presenter of the variety/game show 3-2-1, comedian Dave Allen, and Northern Irish entertainer Jimmy Cricket.
