= Chalet girl =

Chalet girl or chalet girl may refer to:

- Chalet Girl, a 2011 romantic comedy sports film
- A female seasonworker working at a chalet
