= Roy James =

Australian rules footballer (1900–1975)

Personal information
- Full name: Melville Leroy James
- Born: 28 January 1900; Ballarat, Victoria
- Died: 20 October 1975 (aged 75); Alfredton, Victoria
- Original team: Golden Point
- Height: 173 cm (5 ft 8 in)
- Weight: 76 kg (168 lb)
- Position: Wingman

Playing career^{1}
Years	Club	Games (Goals)
1923–24	Melbourne	3 (1)
- ^{1} Playing statistics correct to the end of 1924.

Melville Leroy James (28 January 1900 – 20 October 1975) was an Australian rules footballer who played with Melbourne in the Victorian Football League (VFL). Originally from Golden Point in the Ballarat Football League, it was expected that South Melbourne would recruit James, but in what was described as a "triumph" by the Football Record, the Melbourne secretary, Andrew Manzie, signed him instead. He was cleared to Essendon in 1926, but never played a senior match for the Bombers.
