= Sky Real Lives =

Programming
- Timeshift service: Sky Real Lives +1

Ownership
- Owner: BSkyB

History
- Launched: 3 October 1994
- Closed: 19 August 2010

Links
- Website: www.sky.com/reallives (No longer online)

Sky Real Lives was an in-house channel from British Sky Broadcasting that showed extensive programmes about travel, adverts for travel agencies and documentaries. The channels closed on 19 August 2010.

== History ==
Sky Real Lives first launched as Sky Travel on 3 October 1994, and became part of the Sky Multichannels package. It originally broadcast between Monday and Thursday between midday and midnight and on Friday between 12pm and 6pm until September 1997. In 2001, the channel started broadcasting 7 days a week from 6am until 11pm.

The channel was revamped in September 2002. Sky Travel launched with Freeview on 30 October 2002, along with Sky News and Sky Sports News. In February 2003, a spin-off of the channels, Sky Travel Shop, launched a dedicated travel retail channel in the Specialist, then Shopping section of the electronic program guide (EPG). In September 2003 both channels were launched on the NTL platform. With increased distribution, Sky Travel changed its programming strategy to attract a wider audience, skewing towards stronger entertainment programs with a travel theme, particularly reality shows. By August 2004, the core channel was broadcasting 24 hours a day and in January 2005, a timeshifted version of Sky Travel was launched.

In October 2005, Sky Travel on Freeview was replaced by Sky Three and on 6 March 2006, the Sky Travel channels were moved from the "Entertainment" section on the Sky EPG, to the "Lifestyle and Culture" section.

In August 2006, Sky Travel began showing reality TV, whilst Sky Travel Extra dedicated its airtime to documentaries

Sky Real Lives 2, the replacement channel for Sky Travel Extra, gained additional broadcast hours from its launch.

From 2002 until 2007, Sky Real Lives 2 only aired from 6am until 1am. However, on 7 November, the channel began 24-hour broadcasts.

Sky Real Lives programmes were showcased on Sky's main channels; Sky1, Sky2, but mostly on its free-to-air sister channel, Sky3 (now known as Sky Mix).

== Changes on Freeview ==
In 2004, Sky Travel showed the first two episodes of the fourth season of US drama 24, simulcasting with Sky's primary channel, Sky One. This led to rumours that the company had planned to turn Sky Travel into a general entertainment channel on Freeview. However, British Sky Broadcasting (BSkyB)'s CEO, James Murdoch, had repeatedly denied the company had any plans to launch any new free-to-air services.

BSkyB's stance on the subject has since changed. On 22 September 2005, it was announced that Sky Travel would be replaced on Freeview by new entertainment channel Sky Three. Although some of Sky Travel's programming will form part of the schedule of Sky Three, Sky Travel itself will still be shown on Sky Digital. Sky Travel ceased to be broadcast on Freeview at 5pm on 31 October 2005.

== Sky Travel relaunches as Sky Real Lives ==
On 17 September 2007, Sky announced plans to rebrand Sky Travel to Sky Real Lives from 7 November 2007. The new channel focused on programmes with a human interest story and was targeted more at women in the 35–54 age range.

Sky's managing director of entertainment Sophie Turner Laing said it seems that the channel would be given a "whole new makeover" that would make it more entertainment oriented. On 7 November, the following channels were changed:

Sky Travel was renamed as Sky Real Lives, Sky Travel +1 was renamed Sky Real Lives +1, Sky Travel Extra renamed to Sky Real Lives 2, and Sky Travel Shop was also renamed to Sky Travel. Sky Real Lives, Sky Real Lives 2, Sky Arts 1 and Sky Arts 2 were launched on UPC Ireland, before being removed on 8 December 2008.

== Closure ==
On 16 June 2010, it was announced that Sky Real Lives, and its portfolio of channels would close on 19 August 2010, with the channels budget shifting to Sky1 and Sky2. Sky Real Lives closed at midnight at 00:30am on 19 August 2010.

== Programming ==
- 24 Hours in Soho
- Airline
- Air Rage
- A Life Without Pain
- America's Fattest City
- A Mother Like Alex
- Babies At Risk
- Baby Race
- Bad Behaviour
- Beat the Bailiff
- The Biggest Loser
- Bombs, Brits and Cheerleaders
- Brain Doctors
- Club Reps
- Coach Trip
- Crime Scene
- Crippendales
- Customs UK
- Dying to Be Apart
- Extreme Lives
- Grimebusters Series 1: 2007 6x24' Series 2: 2008 10x24'
- HD Short Films
- Holiday Airline
- How Long Will You Live?
- Ian Wright's Unfit Kids
- Intervention
- Jodie Kidd's Fashion Avenue
- The Lion Man
- London Ambulance Series 1: 2007 6x24' Series 2: 2008 6x24'
- Love Behind Bars
- Luton Airport
- Masterminds
- Petnapped
- Phobia
- Polygamous Wives
- Psychic Detectives
- Quintuplets
- Real A&E
- Redcoats
- Real Life Stories
- Risky Business
- Searching For My Son
- Secrets Revealed - DNA Stories
- Sky Travel
- Suicide In The Air
- Swapped Children
- Taken Away
- Teenage Gamblers
- Terry Gee: Living With HIV
- The Clinic
- The Filth Files
- The Little Couple
- The Man Who Faked His Life
- The Zoo UK
- Ultra Tall: Jabe Babe
- Vanity Insanity
- Vain Men
- Wakey Wakey Campers
- Wildlife Detectives
- Women Behind Bars
- X-Weighted
- Zoo Story
- Zoo Vets at Large

== Sky Real Lives HD ==
A high-definition version of the channel was launched on Sky+ HD on 20 October 2008, on channel 278.
