= Club Reps =

British factual entertainment television programme

- Narrated by: Lisa I'Anson; Emma B
- Opening theme: "Luv Now"
- Ending theme: "Luv Now"
- Composer: Delta One
- Country of origin: United Kingdom
- Original language: English
- No. of series: 3
- No. of episodes: 36 (including Aftersun)

Production
- Executive producer: Helen Alexander
- Producer: Elisabet Wootton
- Running time: 30/60 minutes (including adverts)
- Production company: STV Studios

Original release
- Network: ITV, ITV2
- Release: 3 January 2002 – 1 June 2004

Club Reps is a factual entertainment programme made for ITV by STV Studios, then known as SMG TV Productions. It ran from 2002 to 2004. The programme has been repeated on Sky Real Lives, Pick and STV local channels STV Edinburgh and STV Glasgow. In 2023, Series 1 began repeats on That's TV.

== Main series ==
In series 1, the show is in Faliraki in Rhodes and the series follows a team of Club 18-30 reps. Some of the main people featured in the series include; Resort manager Marie Slater, AKA "Maz"; Area controller Lee; and Club Rep Mark.

As with series 1, series 2 (Club Reps: The Workers) is also in Faliraki, although this time the series looks at individual people working in the resort. Some of the main people featured include: Lee from series 1 returns as he has left Club 18–30, Andy King, Stacey, and Charmaine.

In series 3, the show moved to Playa del Inglés in Gran Canaria. This series was similar to the first, as it followed the everyday working life of the small team of Club 18-30 reps there. Some of the main people featured include: Area controller Ash, Senior rep Max, Admin girl Syreeta, Rep Lou, and Rep Johnny Hormone.

Each series contained 10 episodes, totalling 30 episodes.

== Spin-off series ==
In addition to the main series, there was a spin-off series to accompany the main programme, known as Club Reps: Uncut (series 1, 2, and 3) and Club Reps: Aftersun (series 3).

The uncut series is an extended version of each episode that was broadcast later on in the week on ITV2. This spinoff aired for every series with an increased duration from 30 to 60 minutes.

The Aftersun series was broadcast on ITV2 and each episode was 60 minutes in length, double that of the previous series. This series followed a similar format to the regular series 2, (Club Reps: The Workers) in so far as it focused on individual people unrelated to a Club 18-30 team. There were 6 episodes in this series.

== History ==
The original series was filmed between April and October 2000.

Former EastEnders actor Joe Swash appeared in the very first episode of the first series; he was at the Hotel Matina in Faliraki with his friends who, after a night of anti-social behaviour, were kicked out of the hotel by Maz.

The original series became an instant hit not least due to "Miss Nasty" resort manager Marie Slater known to viewers as Maz. Nevertheless, she later claimed the show ruined her life.

== Broadcasts ==
Club Reps was televised on the ITV Network and had sister shows, Club Reps: Uncut and Club Reps: Aftersun that were broadcast on ITV2 between 2002 and 2004.

== After Club Reps ==
Over the years, Club Reps and Aftersun have all been repeated on Sky Real Lives, Pick and most recently in 2016 on STV local channels STV Edinburgh and STV Glasgow, where the Uncut version is also receiving its first rerun since the original broadcast. In 2023, series 1 was repeated on local tv channel That's TV.

Maz, who featured in series 1, now owns a bar called H. Nicholsons in Altrincham. This opened in February 2006. As well as this, she occasionally works as a television presenter in the tourism area. Lee Watson, who also featured in series 1 and additionally series 2, was a resident DJ in Blackpool nightclub Syndicate up until its closure in 2011. Lee is also a successful DJ producer under the name Delta3.
