= P. J. Kavanagh =

English writer and broadcaster (1931–2015)

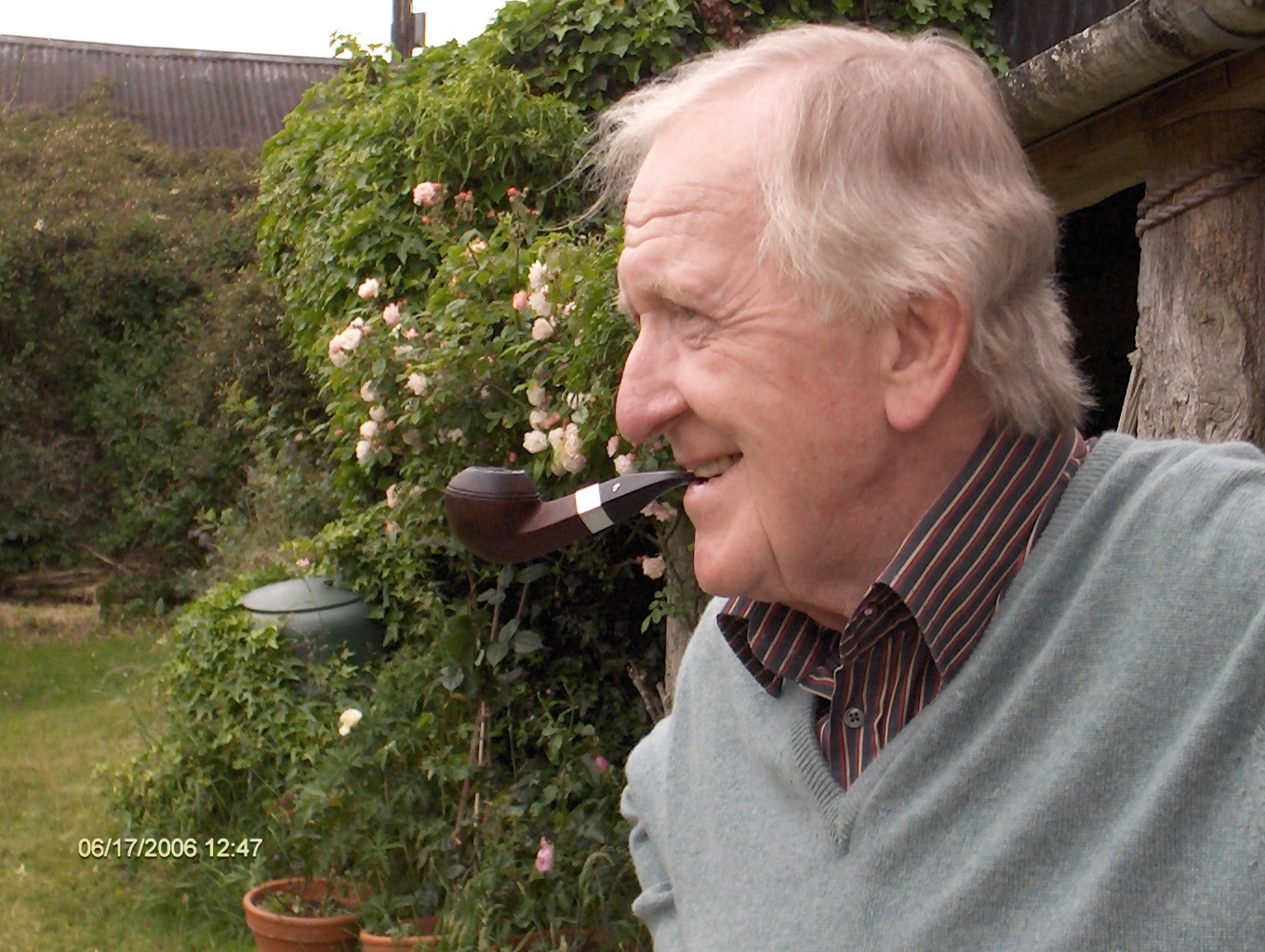
- Kavanagh at his home in 2006
- Born: Patrick Joseph Kavanagh; 6 January 1931; Worthing, Sussex, England
- Died: 26 August 2015 (aged 84)
- Education: Douai School; Merton College, Oxford
- Occupations: Poet, actor, journalist
- Spouse(s): Sarah Philipps (m. 1956–1958; her death); Catherine Ward (m. 1965)
- Children: 2

P. J. Kavanagh FRSL (6 January 1931 – 26 August 2015) was an English poet, lecturer, actor, broadcaster and columnist. His father was the ITMA scriptwriter Ted Kavanagh.

== Life ==
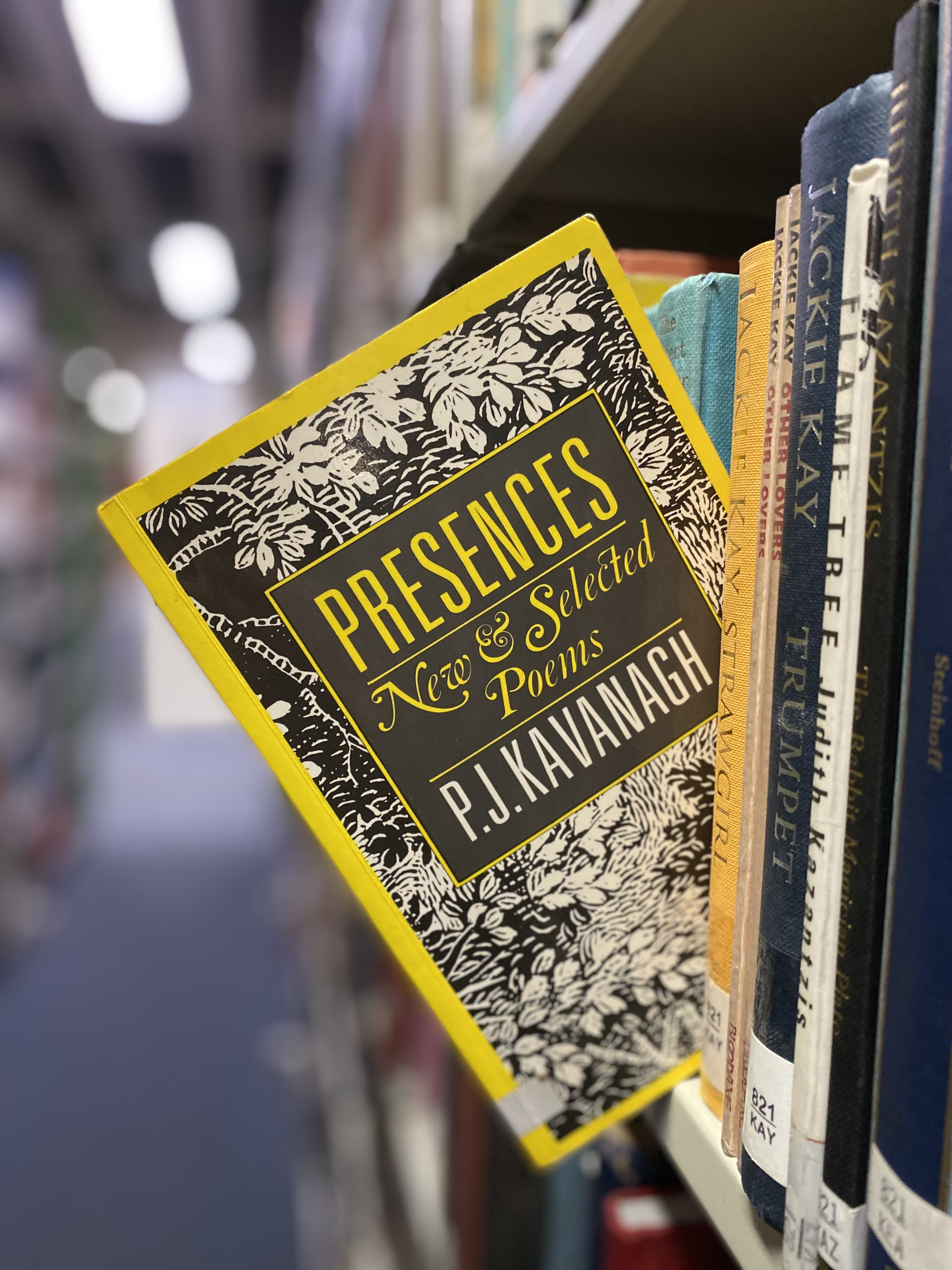
P. J. Kavanagh. Presences: New & Selected Poems.

Patrick Joseph Gregory Kavanagh worked as a Butlin's Redcoat, then as a newsreader for Radiodiffusion Française, in Paris. He attended acting classes but was called up for National Service, and was wounded in the Korean War. Kavanagh attended Merton College, Oxford, from 1951 to 1954; there he began to write poetry, and met Caroline Sarah Jane Philipps, also known as Sally, the daughter of the novelist Rosamond Lehmann. Due to his traumatic experience in Korea, Kavanagh had a hard time taking the educational institution seriously; however, he managed to pass the degree with second-class honours. He and Philipps wed in 1956 in the London Oratory; two years later she died suddenly, of poliomyelitis, while they were living in Java, where he was teaching for the British Council. His memoir about their relationship, The Perfect Stranger, won the Richard Hillary Memorial Prize after a long publishing battle, where Kavanagh's work was turned down by several publishers.

== Career ==
=== Poetry and journalism ===
He published several volumes of poetry: One and One (1959), On the Way to the Depot (1967), About Time (1970), Edward Thomas in Heaven (1974), Life Before Death (1979) and An Enchantment (1991) and Something About (2004). There were collections: Selected Poems, Presences: New and Selected Poems, and Collected Poems. In 1993 he was given the Cholmondeley Award for poetry.

Kavanagh's first novel, A Song and a Dance, was awarded the Guardian Fiction Prize; he wrote three further novels: A Happy Man, People and Weather, and Only by Mistake; and two novels for children: Scarf Jack and Rebel for Good. He published a collection of essays and articles People and Places: A Selection 1975–1987, a travel autobiography Finding Connections, and a literary companion Voices in Ireland. He was a columnist for The Spectator from 1983 to 1996 and then for The Times Literary Supplement until 2002. Most of his journalistic work was based on book and poetry reviews as well as his personal reflections and experience. He was editor of Collected Poems of Ivor Gurney, The Bodley Head G. K. Chesterton, The Essential G. K. Chesterton, The Oxford Book of Short Poems (with James Michie) and A Book of Consolations. He co-presented the programmes Poetry Please on BBC Radio 4 and Not So Much a Programme on BBC1 TV alongside David Frost and Willie Rushton.

=== Acting ===
His acting roles included the films Masters of Venus (1962), Half Moon Street (1986) and Hidden Agenda (1990), and his television appearances include Journey Through Summer, as the Nazi-memorabilia-collecting Father Seamus Fitzpatrick in the episode of Father Ted, "Are You Right There, Father Ted?", and as the secret agent Sean Mortimer suffering from drug-induced amnesia in the episode "The Forget-Me-Knot" of the series The Avengers, the last episode with Diana Rigg in the female leading role.

== Kavanagh's Irish connections ==
Both his parents' relatives originated from Ireland; his father's family came from County Carlow and his mother was thought to be born in County Roscommon, but was brought up in Scotland.

P. J. Kavanagh spoke for RTÉ Radio 1 in 2013 about his national identity: “Even at school I was always regarded as 'Irish'". "I was supposed to be good at rugby because I was Irish", "It was an imprint". He wrote a travel biography Finding Connections (1990), where he uncovered his family roots, going back to his great-grandfather, Patrick, and taking on a journey to Australia, Tasmania and New Zealand. He also published a literary companion, Voices in Ireland (1994), about the country viewed through local literature.

In 1995 he made an appearance on Father Ted, a popular British sitcom following the lives of Irish priests, where he co-starred alongside actors like Dermot Morgan, Ardal O'Hanlon and Frank Kelly.

=== Connection to the Irish poet Patrick Kavanagh ===
P. J. Kavanagh considered himself a great admirer of the Irish poet, Patrick Kavanagh. The men met twice, where at first encounter Patrick Kavanagh asked him why he would not change his name. From that moment on, Kavanagh started using the abbreviation 'P. J.' in his writing to avoid potential confusion.

== The Perfect Stranger ==
Published in 1966, Kavanagh’s first major literary success and the most recognised work of Kavanagh’s legacy, The Perfect Stranger, is an autobiographical novel about the mourning of his first wife, Sally. A memoir about marriage and the life after it, death and finding purpose, The Perfect Stranger also dealt with Kavanagh's sense of humour.

During the process of writing The Perfect Stranger, P. J. Kavanagh remarried and lived with his family in rural England in Gloucestershire, residing in a renovated stone barn with a cottage nearby, where the poet had his creative space and writing room.

== Death ==
Kavanagh lived in Gloucestershire from 1963 until his death. He married his second wife, Catherine Ward, in 1965; they had two sons together.

== Publications ==
- One and One, London: Heinemann, 1959.
- The Perfect Stranger (autobiography), London: Chatto and Windus, 1966.
- On the Way to the Depot, London: Chatto & Windus/The Hogarth Press, 1967.
- A Song and a Dance, 1968
- About Time, London: Chatto & Windus/The Hogarth Press, 1970.
- A Happy Man, 1972.
- Edward Thomas in Heaven, London: Chatto & Windus/The Hogarth Press, 1974.
- People and Weather, London: John Calder, 1978. ISBN 0-7145-3666-0
- Scarf Jack, 1978.
- Life Before Death, London: Chatto & Windus/The Hogarth Press, 1979. ISBN 0-7011-2415-6
- Rebel for Good, 1980.
- Collected Poems of Ivor Gurney (editor), Oxford University Press, 1982 ISBN 0-19-211963-X (paperback)
- The Oxford Book of Short Poems (co-editor with James Michie), Oxford University Press, 1985.
- The Bodley Head G. K. Chesterton, (editor), 1985
- Only by Mistake, 1986.
- The Essential G. K. Chesterton, (editor), 1987
- People and Places: a selection 1975–1987, 1988
- Finding Connections, 1990
- An Enchantment, Manchester: Carcanet, 1991. ISBN 0-85635-961-0
- A Book of Consolations, (editor), 1992
- Collected Poems. Manchester: Carcanet, 1995. ISBN 978-1-85754-212-7
- Voices in Ireland: A Traveller's Literary Companion, John Murray, 1995.
- Something About, Manchester: Carcanet, 2004.
- P. J. Kavanagh Reading from his poems, The Poetry Archive 2005

== Partial filmography ==
- Masters of Venus (1962) – Mike
- Lawrence of Arabia (1962) – Staff Major – Murray's Aide (uncredited)
- The Naked Brigade (1965) – Lt. Bentley
- Half Moon Street (1986) – General Sir George Newhouse
- Hidden Agenda (1990) – Alec Nevin
