= The Filth Files =

The Filth Files is a New Zealand based documentary series that follows the work of a team of Public Health Officers. Each week the programme focuses on the work of a small number of officers as they visit businesses in the North Shore City district of Auckland. Over the course of the series a wide variety of businesses such as restaurants, takeaways, funeral parlours and massage parlours are inspected for their cleanliness.

The series is currently shown on Sky3 and Sky Real Lives, and was screened on TV2 in December 2010.
