= Cox & Kings =

Indian travel and holiday company

Cox & Kings (formerly known as Cox & Kings Ltd.) was established in 1758 and is one of the longest-established travel brands. In 2019, the UK business of Cox & Kings, along with the rights worldwide excluding India, was acquired by Abercrombie & Kent following insolvency proceedings. In May 2024, the rights to the Indian entity were acquired by Singapore-based private equity firm Wilson & Hughes through an insolvency process overseen by the National Company Law Tribunal.

== The Years Preceding 2019 ==
Historically, Cox and Kings Ltd. was an army agent, travel agent, a printer and a publisher. It has also worked as a newsagent, cargo agent, ship-owner, banker, insurance agent, and dealer of several travel-related activities. Its core activities now include the sale of packaged holidays.

In the United Kingdom, Cox & Kings was acquired out of administration by Abercrombie & Kent which continues to operate the brand under its ownership.

In India, Cox & Kings Ltd. was declared bankrupt in 2020 and underwent insolvency proceedings under the Indian Insolvency and Bankruptcy Code. In May 2024, Singapore-based private equity firm Wilson and Hughes Pte, led by Karan Agarwal, acquired Cox & Kings India. The acquisition included over 200 sub-brands, such as Luxury Escapades, Duniya Dekho, Bharat Dekho, Bhakti Yatra, Holiday 365, and Tour to Feast.

== History ==
=== Richard Cox, the founder ===
Richard Cox founder of Cox & Kings

Cox was born in Yorkshire in 1718. His father had made a good living as a lawyer and had moved from his birthplace in Clent in Worcestershire to Yorkshire. He then bought an estate near Quarley in Hampshire. Richard Cox came into the service of a General, Lord Ligonier, as a clerk in the early 1740s. In 1747 he married Caroline Codrington, daughter of Sir William Codrington.

Cox's career took off when Lord Ligonier led the Flanders campaigns of the War of the Austrian Succession. In one letter sent back to London, Richard Cox made a demand that "suitable winter provisions and housing should be made available for the three English companies" and he became entwined with logistics and the general welfare of the troops. Ligonier made Cox his private secretary in the late 1740s, went on to become the colonel of the First Foot Guards (Grenadier Guards) in 1757, and rewarded Cox with the post of "military agent" after the incumbent died in May 1758. Thus was born Cox & Co.

There were about a dozen main agents working for the army at that time and each regimental colonel chose one to serve their troops. These agents arranged the payment of officers and men, organized the provision of clothing, acted as intermediaries for the buying and selling of officers' commissions and acted on any special requests from the regimental adjutant. Duties ranged from the shipment of personal effects to the requisition of weapons or supplies. Cox had taken on the most prestigious infantry regiment, and the 63rd Regiment and the Royal Artillery soon followed.

In 1765 Cox went into partnership with Henry Drummond, whose family ran the London bank. Cox & Drummond moved from Cox's house in Albemarle Street to Craig's Court, just off what is now Whitehall. By the mid-1760s Cox & Drummond had blossomed to become agents for the Dragoons and eight more Infantry regiments. Success was built on the company's reputation for keen attention to the welfare of its regiments. In 1763, for instance, when Robert Clive stormed the fortress of Gheria in India, Cox successfully negotiated with the East India Company who had "borrowed" stores from Cox's clients, the Royal Artillery. He arranged to receive repayment from the East India Company by way of plunder from Gheria. He had this converted into silver in India and shipped back to London where the funds were returned to the Royal Artillery.

Back home, Cox's house on Albemarle Street (opposite the present-day Ritz Hotel) was known for its parties. In addition, he was a patron of the arts, being acquainted with David Garrick and other notable actors of the time, and was a founding financial investor in the rebuilding of the Theatre Royal in Drury Lane. He was also a generous benefactor to St George's Hospital on Hyde Park Corner (now the Lanesborough Hotel). The records of the family estate at Quarley show that Cox spent over £3,000 per annum running it, much of it lavished on his wife.

By 1768, Cox & Drummond were flourishing, with a turnover of £345,000 per annum. During the 1770s the company continued to grow, aided by war in the American Colonies and the threat of invasion from France. Cox repeated his good fortune with business partners, taking in Mr Mair upon Drummond's death in 1772, followed by his own son Richard Bethell Cox in 1779 and then Mr Greenwood in 1783. It was during this time that the company expanded its banking interests, offering loans and accounts to exclusive members of London's elite. Frederick, Duke of York, introduced Cox's business partner Greenwood to his father George III, as "Mr Greenwood, the gentlemen who keep my money". Greenwood replied rather cheekily that, "I think it is rather his Royal Highness who keeps my money", to which George III burst out in laughter and said, "Do you hear that Frederick? Do you hear that? You are the gentleman who keeps Mr Greenwood's money!"

The company was thriving by the time of the outbreak of war with France in 1793, employing some 35 clerks. In 1795 they served 14 regiments of cavalry, 64 infantry regiments, and 17 militia regiments, becoming the largest military agent for the army. Richard Cox died in August 1803, leaving his grandson Richard Henry Cox firmly established, with Greenwood as a controlling partner.

=== 19th century onwards ===
Cox & Co grew through the 18th and 19th centuries. Timely alliances with the great banking families such as the Hammersleys and Greenwoods secured an established position in London, and by the end of the 19th century, most regiments used Cox & Co as their agents. As the empire grew, Cox & Co met the demand for officers to be looked after. The company set up five branches in India between 1905 and 1911.

At the start of World War I, Cox & Co employed some 180 staff, of which one third joined the army. During the war some 250,000 men were on their books, 50,000 cheques were cleared a day and a special department was set up to deal with the influx of American soldiers in 1917. By the end of the war, some 4,500 people worked for the firm. Cox & Co suffered a downturn in business as a result of the end of the war in 1918.

After the war, Cox & Co. expanded to Alexandria and Egypt (1919 and 1920) and Rangoon (1921). In October 1922, Cox & Co bought Henry S. King Bank, which had a large network of branches in India. They also moved into new offices in Pall Mall. However, in 1923, still suffering from the 1918 downturn, Cox & Kings was forced to sell to Lloyds Bank.

During the 1930s, Lloyds sold its Indian interests to Grindlays Bank, who also took the travel and shipping agencies, which continued to flourish in India.

=== Recent history ===
The company was incorporated in India as the "Eastern Carrying Company" on 7 June 1939, under the Indian Companies Act, VII of 1913. The name of the company was changed to "Cox & Kings (India) Ltd." on 23 February 1950, after the introduction of Companies Act 1956.

In the year 1970, Cox & Kings Ltd. centred the Grindlays Group pursuant to the acquisition of Cox & Kings (Holdings) Ltd. by National and Grindlays Bank Ltd and increased its focus on the business of travel and tourism. In the 1970s, a change in British banking regulations required Grindlays to sell its non-banking interests, and a partnership between Ajit Kerkar and Anthony Good bought Cox & Kings, which at the time was mainly India-based. Cox & Kings Ltd. got listed and completed a $110 million IPO in December 2009. A GDR float of $65 million was issued in August 2010. The overseas stocks were also listed on the Luxemburg Stock Exchange. The company completed its QIP of $160 million in November 2014.

In 1980, Grindlays divested its non-banking activities because of governmental regulations. This business interest in the travel business was bought by ABM Good and John Norman Romney Barber from Grindlays by acquiring Cox & kings (Holdings) Ltd. Cox & Kings Ltd., under its present ownership, as it continued to function as a specialised Tour operator. It also branched out into special interest holidays for artists, botanists and natural historians. In 1980, Reserve Bank of India vide its letter dated 14 May 1980, permitted Cox & Kings (Agents) Ltd., a new company incorporated in the United Kingdom, to transfer the business operations of its branch offices in Bombay (now Mumbai) and New Delhi to Cox & Kings (India) Ltd. Cox & Kings (Agents) Ltd. continued with the business from its head office in London. In consideration of the transfer of the business, Cox & Kings (India) Ltd. issued its shares to Cox & Kings (Agents) Ltd. As a condition of Indianisation imposed by the Reserve Bank of India, Cox & Kings (India) Ltd issued and allotted 60% of the shares to Resident Indians and Staff Gratuity Trust Fund.

Cox & Kings opened a USA office in June 1988 in New York, NY, then moved the USA office to Tampa, Florida.

Cox & Kings Travel Ltd., UK, a wholly owned subsidiary of Cox & Kings (UK) Ltd., is an outbound specialist tour operator and caters to the leisure travel market in Europe. Cox & Kings Ltd. (UK) holds 100% of Cox & Kings Travel Ltd. The latter is a dedicated wholesaler of products and services to other tour operators. It also offers ground handling capabilities in select geographies. Cox & Kings Travel Ltd. also holds 100% of East India Travel Company, Inc., a US-based subsidiary of the company. East India Travel Company, Inc. is in the business of selling upmarket tour and travel packages in the US.

In August 2009, Cox & Kings USA came under the umbrella brand of East India Travel Company, a subsidiary of Cox & Kings Ltd, the global parent company. In October 2010, Cox & Kings USA was rebranded Cox & Kings, The Americas, and became responsible for all sales in North and South America. Cox & Kings, The Americas relocated from Tampa to Los Angeles, California in May 2011.

In January 2010, Cox & Kings acquired Tempo Holidays, a wholesale travel company based in Melbourne, Australia for an undisclosed sum, rumoured to be in the vicinity of US$25 million, and trades under that brand. In January 2010, it also acquired Bentours (based in Sydney, Australia) from the German giant TUI Travel. Bentours also continues to trade under its brand name.

In 2014, Cox & Kings group sold Camping unit for GBP 89 million. On 2 June 2014, Cox & Kings announced the sale of the camping division of its subsidiary Holidaybreak, to France's Homair Vacances, for 892 crores.

In October 2015, Cox & Kings Group acquired 100% of the issued and outstanding shares of LateRooms Ltd (UK) ("LateRooms") for GBP 8.5 million.

LateRooms is an online hotel booking specialist in the UK. It offers a range of accommodation options with over 54,800 properties globally, which can be booked up to a year in advance.

In December 2015, it also sold 100% of the issued and outstanding shares of Explore Worldwide Limited for GBP 25.8 million to Hotelplan UK Group.

In March 2016, it sold 100% of LateRooms to Enterprises UK Ltd. ("Malvern") for GBP 20 million. Cox & Kings' 65.58%-owned subsidiary, Holidaybreak Ltd., sold 100% of its Superbreak business to Malvern for a net consideration of GBP 9.25 million.

In December 2019, Abercrombie & Kent, a luxury travel company headquartered in Illinois, United States, acquired the UK operations of Cox & Kings. This acquisition was intended to bolster Abercrombie & Kent's presence in the luxury travel market by leveraging the strong trade partnerships and client base of both entities.

In August 2019, Cox & Kings stated that it would be unable to declare its financial results for the first quarter of the year. This announcement came following news of a liquidity crunch being faced by the company, beginning with loan defaults on commercial papers, which then led to a sharp decline in the company's stock.

In December 2019, Cox & Kings was acquired by Abercrombie & Kent.

In May 2024, Wilson and Hughes Pte, a Singapore-based private equity firm, acquired the rights to Cox & Kings India out of insolvency. The acquisition included over 200 sub-brands, such as Luxury Escapades, Duniya Dekho, Bharat Dekho, Bhakti Yatra, Holiday 365, and Tour to Feast Following the acquisition, Karan Agarwal was appointed Director of Cox & Kings India.

== See also ==
- Holt's Military Banking

== Sources ==
- Booker, John. "Cox, Richard". Oxford Dictionary of National Biography (online ed.). Oxford University Press. doi:10.1093/ref:odnb/45706. (Subscription, Wikipedia Library access or UK public library membership required.)
- Lloyds Bank Pamphlet (1990), Cox's & King's: The Evolution of a Military Tradition
- Lloyds TSB Archives. Cox & Co 1758 to 1922 – an excellent selection of company records, the private papers of Richard Cox and partners. Details
- Sumit Gairola (2015) "Travel Happiness" & "Uttarakhand Tourism" Cox & Kings Travel Compass Magazine
- Leslie Pressnell and John Orbell (1985), Guide to the Historical Records of British Banking
