= Holidaybreak =

Travel agency in the United Kingdom

Holidaybreak Limited is a company based in London whose main business is the Meininger hotels chain.

== History ==
By 2007, Holidaybreak held a portfolio of specialist holiday businesses.

Holidaybreak became a wholly owned subsidiary of former competitor Cox & Kings in July 2011 after a long period of attempting to sell two loss-making parts of its business, Explore and Superbreak. Three years later, in June 2014, Cox & Kings announced the sale of the camping division of its subsidiary Holidaybreak Ltd to France’s Homair Vacances, for 89 billion Rs (approx. $145 million).

In 2022, following the 2020 collapse of Cox & Kings, Holidaybreak was ultimately controlled by Ares Management, an American asset management company. It conducts most of its business through Meininger Hotels Limited, which operates hotels in Germany and several other European countries.

== Brands ==
Holidaybreak operates under multiple brands, however, the majority of their customer volume is through PGL and through their Meininger Division. Other brands include NST, EST, and Travelplus.

=== PGL ===
PGL is a children's holiday firm providing educational and residential school trips as well as holiday camps in the United Kingdom.

=== NST ===
NST or the NST Travel Group is a British educational travel company specialising in tailor-made tours for schools and colleges.
