= Thinkmoney =

Think Money Ltd
- Company type: Private
- Industry: Financial services
- Headquarters: Trafford Park, Greater Manchester, UK
- Products: Current Account, Credit Card, Insurance, Loan
- Owner: tmg
- Number of employees: 1000
- Website: thinkmoney.co.uk

Think Money Ltd, stylised as thinkmoney, is a UK-based banking services provider that primarily offers current accounts for a fixed monthly fee with no overdraft or transaction charges. Thinkmoney's online system offers a budgeting service that sees customers money split into two accounts, one for spending and one for bills – an approach sometimes known as jam jar banking.

Thinkmoney's current account has received a four-star mark by the Fairbanking Foundation.

In 2012 customers of thinkmoney (then known as thinkbanking) were left without access to their money, due to a computer failure at Royal Bank of Scotland which it relies on for access to the payments infrastructure. A similar failure at RBS left some thinkmoney customers without access to their incomes again in June 2015.

== See also ==
- List of companies based in Greater Manchester
