= Wraprascal =

Great coat

Wraprascal or "wrap-rascal" was an 18th-century term for a loose overcoat. It was long and loose and was worn by both men and women. The garment was fastened with huge metal buttons and was occasionally cape-style. The coat was used for riding.

Frederick William Fairholt compares it to the following version of surtout in his work Costume in England.

" In Gay's “ Trivia, " “ a Joseph ” is given as explanation of “ surtout, " and is further described as a wraprascal "

— Costume in England
