= Club 18-30 =

Holiday package company for young adults

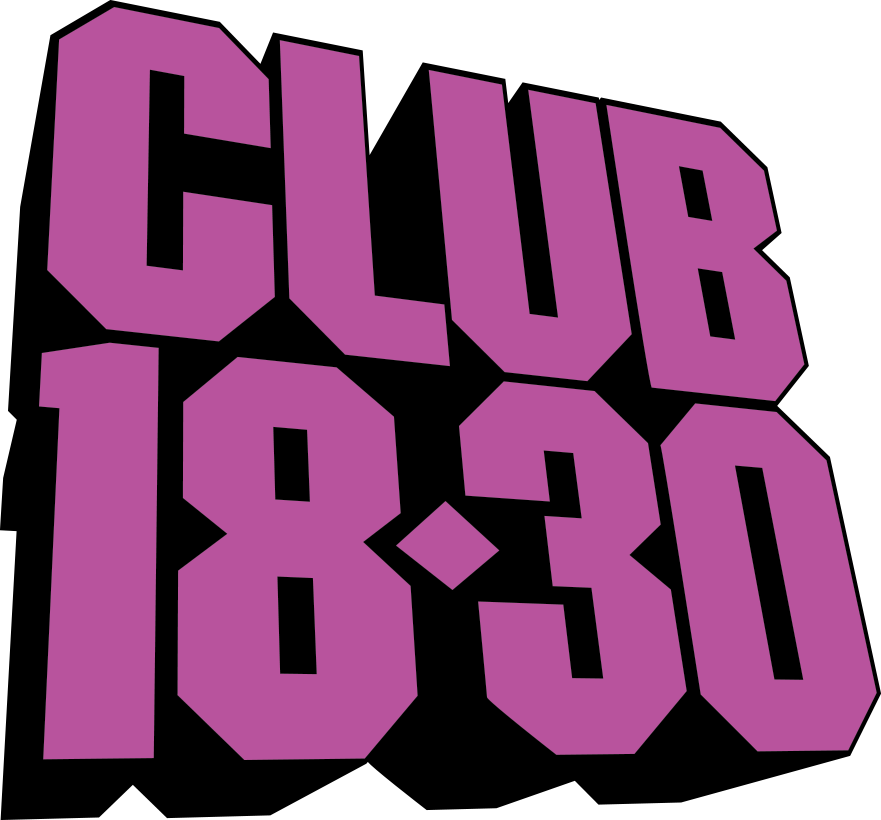
- Type: Private
- Industry: Package holidays
- Founded: 1968
- Defunct: 30 October 2018
- Fate: Closed
- Headquarters: Peterborough, England, UK
- Area served: United Kingdom, Spain, Greece
- Parent: Thomas Cook Group
- Website: Club 18-30

Club 18-30 was a holiday company working from its head office in Peterborough, that provided holidays for people aged 18–30 in typical party island destinations. Club 18-30 was sold on to Thomas Cook in 1998 and took around 45,000 guests each year. The average age of guests was 19, and one third of customers were travelling on holiday without their parents for the first time.

On 8 October 2018, it was confirmed by Thomas Cook that the Club 18–30 brand would no longer continue after summer 2018. The last Club 18-30 holiday-makers travelled from Manchester to Magaluf on 27 October 2018 and returned on 30 October 2018.

== History ==
Club 18-30 was set up in 1968 by the Horizon Group to offer package holidays targeted at young singles and couples to travel without families or children. The idea for Club 18-30 came from Paul Latchman. Initial promotion was low-key, and to maximise the use of cheap airfares, night flights were used. The first destination was Lloret de Mar on the Costa Brava. The Horizon Group only received modest success and sold the company on to a management buyout in 1973.

During the 1970s, the popularity of Club 18-30 was increased through cut-price airfares. Advertising for the company promoted the idea of holidays with sexually-active and uninhibited, often alcohol-fuelled fellow holidaymakers, which would become Club 18-30's reputation.

Despite its notorious image, the company was listed on the London Stock Exchange (LSE) in 1980. In 1982, it was acquired by International Leisure Group (ILG) and continued to grow and prosper. In 1991, ILG collapsed and was taken over as a management buy-out backed by venture capitalists County NatWest Ventures, Grosvenor Capital and Causeway Capital, in a transaction valued at £167,000. After being briefly rebranded as The Club due to regulatory rules precluding the use of the name for 3 years, it reverted to the original name in 1994. In 1995, the company was sold for around £9.75m as a part of a "bimbo" (Buy-in Management Buyout) with various venture capitalists, including Royal Sun Alliance and others and incorporated with Sunset Holidays and the newly formed airline Flying Colours.

In 1998, Thomas Cook acquired Flying Colours for £57.5m. Club 18-30 was subsequently incorporated into Thomas Cook's JMC (John Mason Cook) brand of travel companies which included the operating brands Flying Colours, Sunworld, Sunset, Inspirations and Caledonian Airways. In 2002, following a strategic review of the business, the management company UP Trips was formed to ensure that Club 18-30 retained its dominant position in the youth market by providing a dynamic package offering. However, by 2008, the UpTrips Management company dissolved, with Club 18-30 once more a key product within the Thomas Cook portfolio. From 2008 onwards, Club 18-30 continued as a part of Thomas Cook, specialising in the youth travel market.

In May 2018, Thomas Cook announced that, due to the changing tastes of consumers and a new focus on the company's own brand portfolio, the future of Club 18-30 would be reviewed. On 8 October 2018, they confirmed that the brand would close, and that summer 2018 would be its last operating season. The last Club 18-30 guests flew home from the island of Zante on 27 September 2018.

Club 18-30 had a smaller, lesser-known sister brand named Club Xtra, that offered holidays in party destinations without a Club 18-30 rep service or excursion programme. The last customers for Club Xtra travelled home at the end of October 2018.

== Destinations ==
- Bulgaria (Sunny Beach)
- Greece (Corfu – Kavos)
- Greece (Crete – Malia)
- Greece (Thassos)
- Cyprus (Ayia Napa)
- Spain (Ibiza – Sant Antoni de Portmany)
- Spain (Mallorca – Magaluf)
- Greece (Zante – Laganas)
- Spain (Gran Canaria – Playa del Ingles)
- Spain (Playa de las Américas – Playa Honda)

== Controversies ==
=== Advertisements ===
In 1995, the company's billboard advertising was investigated by the Advertising Standards Authority as the second-most complained about advertising of the year. The adverts, designed by Saatchi & Saatchi, included the phrases "Beaver Espana", "Be up at the crack of Dawn... or Julie... or..." and "It's not all sex, sex, sex. There's a bit of sun and sea as well". The adverts were the subject of an activist graffiti campaign in Manchester and succeeded in gaining local and national media attention.

=== Club Reps on ITV ===
Beginning in January 2002, the ITV programme Club Reps, produced by STV Productions, followed the life of a travel representative on Club 18-30 holidays.

In 2005, Channel 5 aired the documentary Curse of Club 18-30, produced by North One Television. Club 18-30 complained to Ofcom over the documentary; Ofcom agreed that they had not been allowed to answer for themselves on the documentary, but the other allegations made were not unfair.
