= Seasonal industry =

Sector with significant seasonal variability

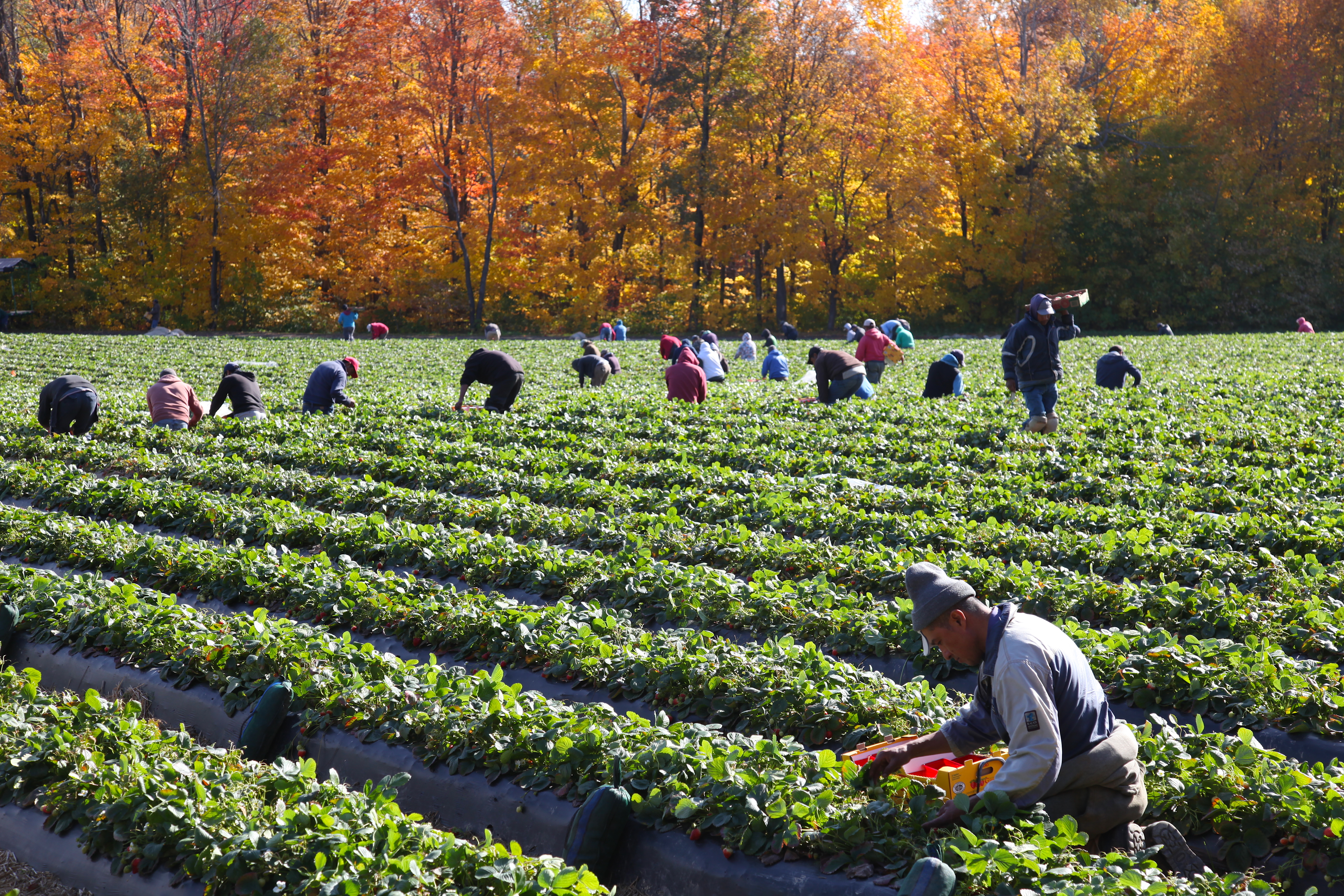
Crop farming may be a seasonal industry

A seasonal industry is activity within an economic sector in which the majority of operations take place during only part of the year, usually within a period of half a year or less.

In some cases, as with agriculture, this limitation may relate to climate or other forces of nature. In others, the seasonality may relate to annual variations in human activity (for example, tourism, restaurants, some forms of manufacturing).

Seasonal industries often feature large swings in labor force size, and in many cases, precipitate mass migrations of workers.

In those countries that provide them, unemployment benefits may be affected by a worker's seasonal status. That is, in certain cases, a seasonal worker may not be considered "unemployed" during the off-season for the sake of benefits or aggregated statistics, despite being functionally inactive.

== Social issues ==
The Home Office has issued a warning to British tourists heading to Mediterranean destinations like Ibiza, Majorca, and Menorca for summer work in 2024. Young Britons seeking jobs in the seasonal industry of nightlife and hospitality are at risk of exploitation by criminal gangs.

As part of 'Operation Karetu', Border Force officials are educating travelers at 22 UK airports about the dangers of modern slavery, sexual exploitation, and illegal employment. Many young workers may face long hours for low pay and may unknowingly engage in unlawful work due to unfamiliarity with EU labor laws.

Authorities stress the importance of securing proper visas and employment contracts before working abroad to protect British youth from unscrupulous employers and ensure their safety in popular tourist areas.

== See also ==
- Seasonworker
