= Beachcroft =

Beachcroft is an English surname. Notable people by that name include:

- C. B. K. Beachcroft (1870–1928), captain of the Great Britain cricket team
- George Beachcroft (1871–1941), administrator of the Richmond Football Club
- Matthews Beachcroft, governor of the Bank of England from 1756 to 1758
- Sir Melvill Beachcroft (1846–1926), British politician and alpinist
- Nina Beachcroft (born 1931), English children's writer
- Samuel Beachcroft (died 1796), governor of the Bank of England from 1775 to 1777
