= Andrew Manzie =

Australian sporting administrator

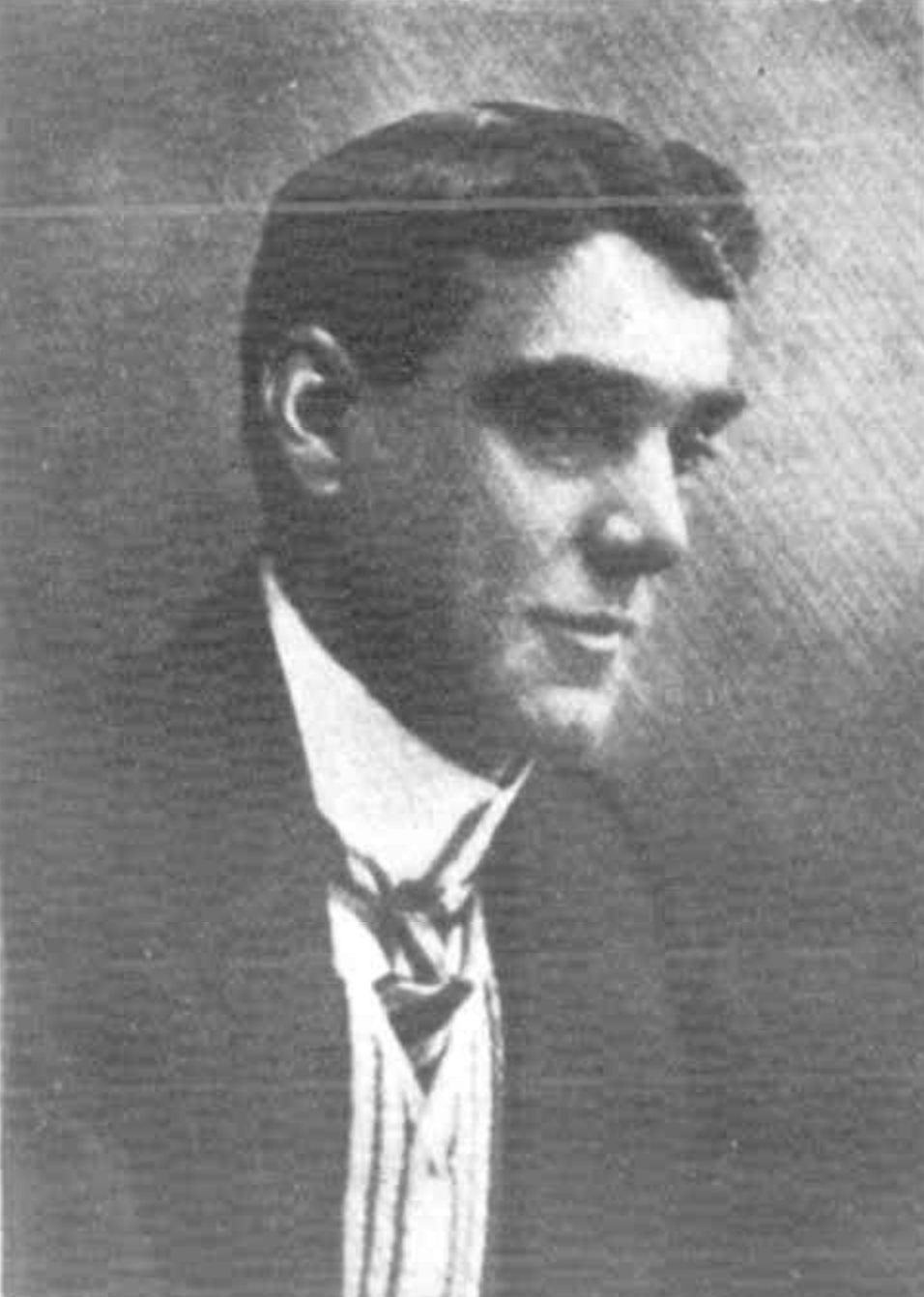
Manzie in 1912

Andrew Arthur Albert Manzie (30 November 1863 – 9 September 1943) was the secretary of the Melbourne Football Club for 20 years, from 1912 to 1931. Before being secretary of Melbourne, Manzie held the same role at Richmond Football Club for five years.

== Early life ==
Born on 30 November 1863, Manzie grew up in Richmond and was educated at Central State School.

== Richmond Football Club ==
Taking over from George Beachcroft, Manzie became secretary of Richmond in 1907, a year before the Tigers were elevated from the Victorian Football Association (VFA) to the Victorian Football League (VFL). In 1909, Manzie was made a life member of Richmond, at the time only the 15th person to be awarded with the honour. Despite this, at Richmond's annual general meeting in 1911, a "reform group" attempted to remove him from the role of secretary. An "overwhelming majority" defeated the motion, but Manzie was still disappointed by the behaviour of many at the meeting and he left Richmond at the end of the season. After it became known that Manzie had decided to leave Richmond, a petition was circulated among Richmond supporters, in an attempt to keep him at Richmond and stay on as secretary, but Manzie did not return.

== Melbourne Football Club ==
Manzie joined fellow VFL club Melbourne for the 1912 season, taking over from G. W. Lamb, the same year that William C. McClelland became president of the club. McClelland and Manzie set about rebuilding the Melbourne side, which had been performing poorly over the previous few seasons, a task that was made more difficult when Melbourne was forced to withdraw from the VFL from 1916 to 1918 due to World War I. Many Melbourne players died in the war and Manzie was once again forced to rebuild. Although Melbourne did not play finals again until 1925, Manzie's work paid off when Melbourne won their second VFL premiership in 1926. He retired from his role as secretary in 1931, after 20 years in the job, having for many years been known by his nickname "the Old Sec". He was succeeded by Charlie Streeter. For his contributions to the club, Manzie was made a life member. He remained a passionate supporter of the Demons until his death.

== Victorian Football League ==
In 1915, Manzie was the honorary secretary of the VFL and was also on numerous VFL committees, often presiding when the VFL president was absent. Manzie was made a life member of the VFL for his services to the Australian National Football Council (ANFC).

== Personal life ==
Manzie was described as "a commanding personality, a finely-built handsome six footer, a wonderful organiser; a brilliant after-dinner speaker and a man of outstanding character and integrity". His wife, Monica (née Bellew), was known as the "mother of the Richmond Football Club" and even after Manzie moved to Melbourne, her passion for the Tigers never wavered. The couple lived on Punt Road near the home grounds of both Melbourne and Richmond. Monica had "family connections with show business" and they entertained many famous guests in their house. Manzie died on 9 September 1943, at his home in Burnley. He was survived by his wife, Monica, who died on 27 December 1951, and their three children; F. Keith Manzie, film critic for The Argus newspaper and occasional dramatist; Rupert Andrew Manzie, a manager of the London Assurance Company; and Elsie Ann Cranswick, who also lived in Burnley. Richmond players wore black armbands in the game following Manzie's death as a mark of respect for his contributions to the club.
