= The Perfect Stranger (book) =

The Perfect Stranger is a book by P. J. Kavanagh, published in 1966. The book won the Richard Hillary Prize.

The book is a partial autobiography, dealing with Kavanagh's childhood and education, his meeting with his first wife (the "perfect stranger" of the title), and her premature death.
