= Canvas Holidays =

European travel company

Canvas Holidays logo

Canvas Holidays is a company which offers camping holidays across Europe.

Founded 50 years ago by the Cuthbert family, it was the pioneer in the sited tent market. Canvas Holidays - which has its headquarters in Dunfermline, Scotland - has campsites in a variety of countries in Europe, including France, Italy, Croatia and Spain.

== Background ==
In 1964, Jim Cuthbert and his wife Margaret Cuthbert decided to set up a camping holiday company. The idea came to them after being on a family holiday themselves, where they had witnessed many families cramming their cars full of camping equipment. It was then that Jim Cuthbert thought it would be more convenient to provide campsites which already had the equipment ready for use, and so Canvas was born.

In 1967, four more campsites were added and Jim Cuthbert was awarded a travel award by The Daily Telegraph for most innovative holiday idea. Further improvements to the Canvas campsites followed, with a site being added in Italy in 1968 and electric lights being introduced in 1969. By the 1970s, route maps had been added to travel packs, fully sprung beds replaced air mattresses and crockery was introduced. In the 1970s, another British camping holiday company – Eurocamp – was established, providing competition for Canvas.

The following decade was a time of further improvements to Canvas' campsites, with the first Spanish campsite being added in 1981. Throughout the remainder of the 1980s, the first mobile homes were introduced, as was the Hoopi's Club programme for children. The founder of the company, Jim Cuthbert, was also awarded the Soleil d'Or from the French Government in 1985 for his contribution to the travel industry.

Over the recent decades, Canvas Holidays continued to progress with the times, introducing a new computerized bookings system in 1994, as well as establishing a new range of tents – the 'Mark IV Tent' and the 'Balmoral'. Updated mobile homes – equipped with dishwashers and CD players – were introduced as part of the 'Millennium' range in 2003, and air conditioning was added to mobile homes in Italy and the South of France in 2004. Canvas also improved the family friendly aspect of their company, introducing free travel for under 18s in 1996, a Toddler Club for under 4s in 2000 and the 'FamilyExtra' programme in 2009.

== Management ==
At the beginning of the 1990s, Canvas Holidays suffered financial difficulties. Due to poor control of costs, revenues fell and thus, the company was sold. Having been under the management of the Cuthbert family for 27 years, in 1992 Canvas Holidays was bought by Andrew Salvesen and George Elles. This partnership bought 75% of the business for £2.5 million, and the headquarters moved to Dunfermline, where they are still based today. Two years later, Salvesen bought the remaining shares from the Cuthbert family. This marked the beginning of a new management team in the business, of which Ian Inwood and Martin Sherring were included.

In November 2002, Canvas underwent further changes. Salvesen left Canvas and, with the support of Bank of Scotland and 3i, Inwood and Sherring bought the company from the previous principal shareholder (Salvesen).

In 2005, Canvas Holidays became part of the Wyndham Worldwide Corporation.

Simon Allan, the current Managing Director of the company, joined Canvas in the early 1990s as a Children's Courier. He became MD in 2010. It has 200 employees.
