= Michael Ingall =

British businessperson (born 1959)

- Born: Michael Julian Ingall; 2 December 1959 (age 66); Lincoln, England
- Occupation: Businessman
- Awards: Hon Fellow of RIBA; Developer of the Decade 2000 (Property Week); Debretts 500 most influential people 2014.
- Website: alliedlondon.com

Michael Julian Ingall (born 2 December 1959 in Lincoln, England) is an English businessman and the chairman and founder of Allied London, a UK-based property development and investment company. He oversaw the restructuring and restoration of several protected historic buildings and landmarks, including: Herbal House (London), The Brunswick Centre (London), The Bonded Warehouse (Manchester), The Malthouse (Leeds), and the former London Road Fire Station (Manchester).

Ingall led the privatisation of Allied London in September 2000. In 2014, he was listed in the property section of Debrett's 500.
