= CarTrawler =

Irish car rental company

- Industry: IT
- Founded: 2004
- Founder: Greg Turley; Niall Turley
- Headquarters: Dublin, Ireland
- Key people: Peter O’Donovan (CEO); Patrick Kennedy
- Revenue: €173.8 million (2023)
- Operating income: €8.3 million (2024)
- Number of employees: 400+ (2024)
- Parent: TowerBrook Capital Partners
- Website: corporate.cartrawler.com/en-gb/

CarTrawler is an Irish car rental provider. Its headquarters are located in Dublin. It has offices in New York City, Melbourne, and London.

As of August 2024, CarTrawler had a network of over 2,200 vehicle rental service providers in 150 countries. It also manages online car rental websites under the brands Holiday Autos and Argus Car Hire.

== History ==
CarTrawler was founded in 2004 by brothers Greg and Niall Turley. In February 2014, as part of a debt-secured deal worth €450 million, CarTrawler was sold to investment firms BC Partners and Insight Ventures Partners. BC Partners received a controlling stake for an undisclosed amount, while Insight Ventures Partners acquired a minority stake. A "significant portion" of the shares remained with local management. It was reported that BC Partners and Insight Ventures Partners used €150 million in debt financing to complete the transaction.

In August 2015, CarTrawler entered into an exclusive partnership agreement with Ryanair. In September 2017, Ryanair announced an extension of this agreement for another two years.

In May 2020, British private equity group TowerBrook Capital Partners invested €100 million to acquire CarTrawler. The acquisition was driven by the company's difficulties amid COVID-19 restrictions. It was noted that BC Partners and Insight Ventures Partners suffered significant losses from this deal.
