= Apadmi Ltd =

Software company in United Kingdom

- Company type: Privately owned
- Founded: 2009; 17 years ago
- Headquarters: Manchester, UK
- Area served: Global
- Key people: Garry Partington; (Founder/CEO); Nick Black; (Founder/CCO); Adam Fleming; (Founder/CTO)
- Industry: Mobile application development
- Employees: 300+
- Website: www.apadmi.com
- Current status: Active

Apadmi is an independent technology company with offices in Manchester, Edinburgh and Amsterdam. Specialising in mobile, Apadmi works with clients including Argos, the BBC, Co-op, Asda, NHS, TalkTalk, Sykes Cottages and Greene King.

== History ==
Apadmi was founded in 2009 by mobile industry experts: Garry Partington (Chief Executive Officer), Nick Black (Chief Commercial Officer), Adam Fleming (Chief Innovation Officer) and Howard Simms, who in 2018 received an honorary Doctorate in Technology from Manchester Metropolitan University.

As of 2024, the company has more than 300 employees. Their Headquarters are in Anchorage Quays, Salford, Manchester.

The team is composed of software engineers, test analysts, project managers, business development managers, account managers, and UX designers, amongst many other positions. Apadmi also employs a number of graduates, interns, and apprentices.

== Business structure ==
The core Apadmi business creates technology focusing on mobile, including application development for iOS and Android devices.

Apadmi designs, develops and optimises mobile apps for leading brands. They unlock new value through strategy, platforms, middleware and systems integrations that transform the way they work.

Apadmi offers Mobile Experiences (MX) for European brands and organizations through its core service offerings; MX Strategy, MX Product, MX Optimise and MX Innovate.

== Awards ==
- 2024 Sunday Times Best Places to Work
- 2024 MPA Awards, Innovation of the Year (with NHS Blood and Transplant)
- 2024 UK Ecommerce Awards, App of the Year (with Domino's Pizza)
- 2024 The Lovie Awards, Highly Commended Food & Drink App of the Year (with Domino's Pizza)
- 2024 UK Dev Awards, Food & Drink App of the Year (with Domino's Pizza)
- 2024 Northern Digital Awards, Finalist, App of the Year (with Domino's Pizz)
- 2024 Northern Digital Awards, Finalist, Best Large Agency of the Year
- 2023 Sunday Times Best Places to Work
- 2023 Prolific North Awards, Fastest Growing Company of the Year
- 2023 Prolific North Awards, Medium Tech Company of the Year
- 2023 UK Business Tech Awards, Medium Tech Company of the Year
- 2023 Global Agency Awards, Large Agency of the Year
- 2023 UK Company Culture Awards, Best Employee Development Programme
- 2023 UK Company Culture Awards, Best Agency Culture
- 2023 UK Dev Awards, App of the Year (with Chetwood Financial)
- 2023 UK Dev Awards, Innovation Award
- 2023 UK Dev Awards, Silver Award, Dev Agency of the Year
- 2018 UK App Awards, Large UK App Agency of the Year
- 2018 MPA Awards, Large Digital Agency of the Year
- 2018 MPA Awards, Best Digital Agency Campaign (with the My Argos Card)
- 2018 Utility Week Awards, Customer Engagement Award (with the United Utilities app)
- 2018 UK Agency Awards, Large Digital Agency of the Year
- 2018 Northern Digital Awards, Large Digital Agency of the Year
- 2018 Top UK App Developers, Clutch

See other awards here.

== Services ==
- Mobile app development
- System architecture and design
- Server development
- User Experience (UX) design
- Service design
- User interface expertise
- User testing and discovery
- User Research
- App Store Optimisation
- Community Management
- Product Marketing
- Customer research
- Voice technology
- Internet of Things (IoT)
- Analytics and Big Data
- AR/VR
- Machine learning
- Mobile strategy and road mapping
- Loyalty solutions
- Gamification
