= In Touch Networks =

English technology company

In Touch Networks Ltd
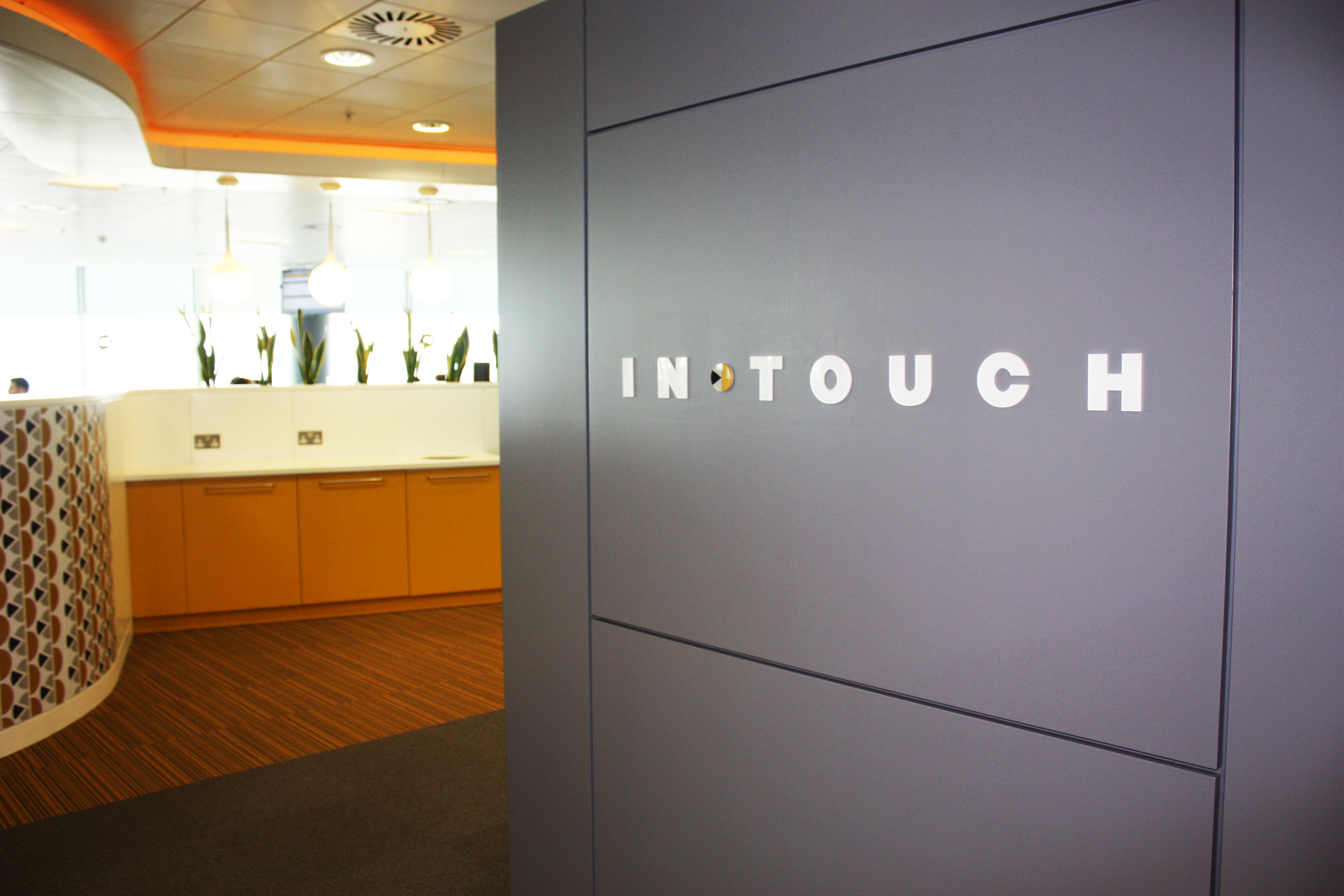
- Industry: Online Technology
- Founded: 1 April 2011
- Headquarters: Manchester, England
- Website: www.intouchnetworks.com

In Touch Networks is an online technology company based in Manchester, England. The company operates a networking and development network for semi-professionals looking to enhance their portfolio. Its members have access to basic tools needed to do this including CPD accredited training, networking events, generic CV writing services and executive coaching.

The company also has a podcast show focused on career development, In Touch Talks Business, and a quarterly magazine publication, In Touch with Business. Its CEO is Matthew Roberts.

In 2018, In Touch Networks placed 19th in the Deloitte Technology Fast 50 awards, recognising it as one of the fastest growing technology businesses in the UK.

== History ==
In Touch Networks launched its first network, NonExecutiveDirectors.com, in 2013. This network was developed to give professionals the skills necessary to successfully make the transition into a non-executive career and allow companies to hire these candidates without heavy recruitment fees.

The company runs networking events, provides executive coaching, has an in-house CV writing service, and provides corporate board analyses.

Having established NonExecutiveDirectors.com as the UK's largest non-executive director network, the company expanded into other sectors, launching four additional networks within 3 years – TheConsultantHub.com, FinanceDirectorNetwork.com, WomenDirectors.com and finally InvestorDirector.com. In 2016, The company also founded a charity, In Touch Futures.

In Touch Networks was also named by Financial Times as one of the top 100 fast growing UK companies that are also making an impact on their industry and wider society.

In December 2018, the company decided to merge all individual networks into one unified network branded In Touch. This was to allow members the flexibility to access more opportunities across sectors. At the same time, the company moved to a new HQ in central Manchester. They have created a bespoke event space that has also allowed them to move into the event management business. In Touch also dedicated time and resources into recruitment, opening their In Touch Careers channel.

== Awards ==
- 2018 - Financial Times Top 100 Fast Growing UK Companies
- 2018 – Deloitte Technology Fast 50, UK 19th Place
- 2017 – Deloitte Technology Fast 50, UK 18th Place
- 2016 – Deloitte Technology Fast 50, UK 39th Place
- 2016 – Deloitte Technology Fast 50, North-West Regional Award Winner
- 2016 – Deloitte Technology Fast 500 EMEA, 258th Place
- 2016 – Best Business Awards, Best Customer Focus Award Winner
- 2016 – CV Magazine Recruitment 100, Best Executive Search Company
