= Seasonworker =

Holiday resort worker

In the United Kingdom, a seasonworker (also called a holiday rep or a saisonaire) is a seasonal worker who spends their summers or winters working abroad for a tour operator.

== Overview ==
A seasonworker can spend up to eight months abroad; as a result, the job is often filled by those on a gap year, students, or those seeking a career break. The jobs are usually low-paid, but accommodation is generally included, as are perks such as ski passes for winter seasons. Seasonworkers usually benefit from ample free time, discounts at the resort where they are based, and the chance to learn about new cultures.

Due to the holiday-like conditions they live in, seasonworkers can have a reputation for being rowdy and irresponsible and encouraging acts such as binge-drinking, an image largely promoted by British television programmes such as Ibiza Uncovered, Ibiza Weekender, and Club Reps. This led to a backlash against many "Brits abroad" holidays by the police and other authorities.

Seasonworkers who work for family camping companies such as Canvas Holidays, Eurocamp, Camping Life, and Keycamp may be somewhat unhappy about being associated with the word "rep" and therefore go by the traditional title of "courier". Being a seasonworker can be enjoyable, but there are times when hard work is required, usually on changeover days when everything needs to be cleaned. Also, at many campsites, owners insist that "live tents" are generally situated in the worst locations, i.e., next to rubbish containers or cesspits.

Some seasonal work, such as sailing and jet skiing instruction, requires staff to obtain a qualification.
