= Superbreak =

Travel agency in the United Kingdom

Super Break
- Website type: Subsidiary
- Founded: 1983; 43 years ago
- Headquarters: York, UK
- Owner: Malvern Group
- Industry: Travel
- Products: Hotels, attractions, theatre, travel
- Parent: Malvern Group
- Divisions: LateRooms (sister company)
- Website: superbreak.com
- Registration: Optional
- Launched: 1983
- Current status: Shutdown 1 August 2019

Super Break was a British holiday company based in York which specialised in UK and European short breaks for over 30 years, including theatre breaks, rail packages and concerts at the O2 Arena in London. On 1 August 2019, they announced they had been placed in Administration.

== History ==
Super Break was founded in 1983. It initially promoted 100 hotels and this number grew rapidly with the release of the bookable website in 1999. Super Break acquired several businesses including Golden Rail in 1989, Hotelnet and Rainbow Holidays in 2000, Bookit in 2004 and West End Theatre Bookings in 2007, West End Theatre Bookings was sold to Encore Tickets in June 2011.

== Awards and recognition ==
Super Break won many awards including the 2012 Travel Weekly Globe Awards for:

- Best Operator UK Holidays
- Best Accommodation Only Supplier

2011 Globe Travel Awards for:

- Best Operator UK Holidays—The company have won this award for the last 20 years.
- Best Accommodation-Only provider
- Favourite European Short Break Operator

Super Break won the 2010 Advantage award for:

- Best Agent Friendly Leisure Travel Company

In 2009, Super Break won three awards in The Co-operative Travel Star Awards:

- Best UK Operator
- Best Accommodation-Only Supplier
- Best Online Booking site

== Short Breaks ==
Super Break offers a range of short breaks which include attraction, rail breaks and Eurostar breaks. Bookings are made using a credit or debit card with no credit card or booking fees. SuperBreak is a member of the Association of British Travel Agents

== Types of accommodation and board basis ==
Super Break provided a wide range of accommodation from 2 star budget hotels or apartments to 5 star luxury boutiques with a range of bed and breakfast, room only or dinner, bed and breakfast offers available.

== Employment ==
Super Break employed 200 staff with the main office based in York city centre.
