= Redcoats (TV series) =

British television series

Redcoats was a docusoap that ran for three series of half-hour episodes, originally aired between 2001 and 2003, which followed the daily lives and activities of Redcoats working at Butlins holiday resorts in the UK.

== Production ==
Originally airing on ITV between 2001 and 2003, Redcoats focused on many aspects of working life at both camps, as well as filming the selection process and giving an insight into how productions came together behind the scenes. It also provided an insight into the lives of Redcoats after they had finished their employment there. Well-known children's television presenter Andy Crane provided the narration for the entire three series, produced by Pilgrim Productions.

Season	Episodes	Originally released	
Season	Episodes	First released	Last released
1	10	2001	2001
2	17	2001	2002
3	14	2003	2003

== Airing and popularity ==
Popularity of the show was high enough to warrant a purchase of the entire series by Sky Television, where it was repeated on a number of channels including Sky Travel, Sky Three and Sky Real Lives, until 2010, when the series ceased to be shown on any channel for the first time since its inception. The final episode of series three can still be seen on Sky Player.

== Notable cast members ==
Redcoat Michael Otton

Redcoat Michael was one of the main Redcoats featured in most of the series. One of the most popular redcoats amongst the guests. His love of presenting and magic took him to Disney and touring the UK with his own magic and illusion show.

Redcoat Tori

Redcoat Tori featured in two series of Redcoats and was well known for her glamorous appearance and friendly nature. She has since worked as a television presenter for price-drop tv and the Honda 4-stroke Power Boat Championships, as well as numerous music-related slots.

Redcoat Dan (James)

Redcoat Dan was one of the most popular Redcoats, although not with the management, as his continued lateness led to his dismissal. Dan was considering a music career at the time and his performance of "To Your Heart" can be heard on series two. Dan is still performing today and has performed for P&O Cruises and the Bellini Grande club in Singapore. He has also modelled part-time for First Choice magazine and Trident Splash. He came second place at Mr Gay Universe.

Redcoat Nicki

Redcoat Nicki was known and loved for her dry and witty and sometimes offbeat sense of humour, as well as being one of the most honest and open Redcoats. She was unfairly dismissed for holidaying with her partner Seth under circumstances she stated in the first episode of series three that "weren't allowed". In their final participation in the series, the couple spoke of the possibility of saving to travel to America and attend Clown School. Redcoats caught up with Nicki and redcoat Modest Dan in Canterbury for the final episode, Nicki had started university moving her onto bigger and better things.

Redcoat Jem

Redcoat Jem was the only prominent cast member to feature in all three series. Jem was well known for her bubbly, bright personality and sense of humour. Jem has since also tried her hand at entering the music industry.

Redcoat Kim

Redcoat Kim was also known for her sense of humour and was arguably the most popular Redcoat with the guests. Sadly, this didn't prevent her from having her contract not renewed in series two, episode three. Kim also suffered an asthma attack on-site while partying in series one, episode three. It is not known which industry Kim is working in today.

Redcoat Pete

Redcoat Pete was known for his practical jokes, including pretending to destroy Jem's comfort blanket in one episode. His easy-going, friendly nature made him very popular with both staff and resident campers. Pete was last heard of working in the pantomime business.

== Legacy ==
Redcoats gave a ground-breaking non-sensationalist, honest approach and focus on the Redcoats' lives both in and out of the camp which made it fascinating and entertaining.

It is not known whether the series will be released on DVD or repeated again at any point in the future.
