= Presnell =

Presnell is a surname and given name. People with that name include:

- Alistair Presnell (born 1979), Australian professional golfer
- Glenn Presnell (1905-2004), American football player, coach, and college athletics administrator
- Gregory A. Presnell (born 1942), Senior United States District Judge of the United States District Court for the Middle District of Florida
- Harve Presnell (1933-2009), American actor and singer
- Michele D. Presnell (born 1952), Republican member of the North Carolina General Assembly
- Pres Mull (Presnell Alfonzo Mull, 1922-2005), American football player and coach
