= George Beachcroft =

Australian sports administrator

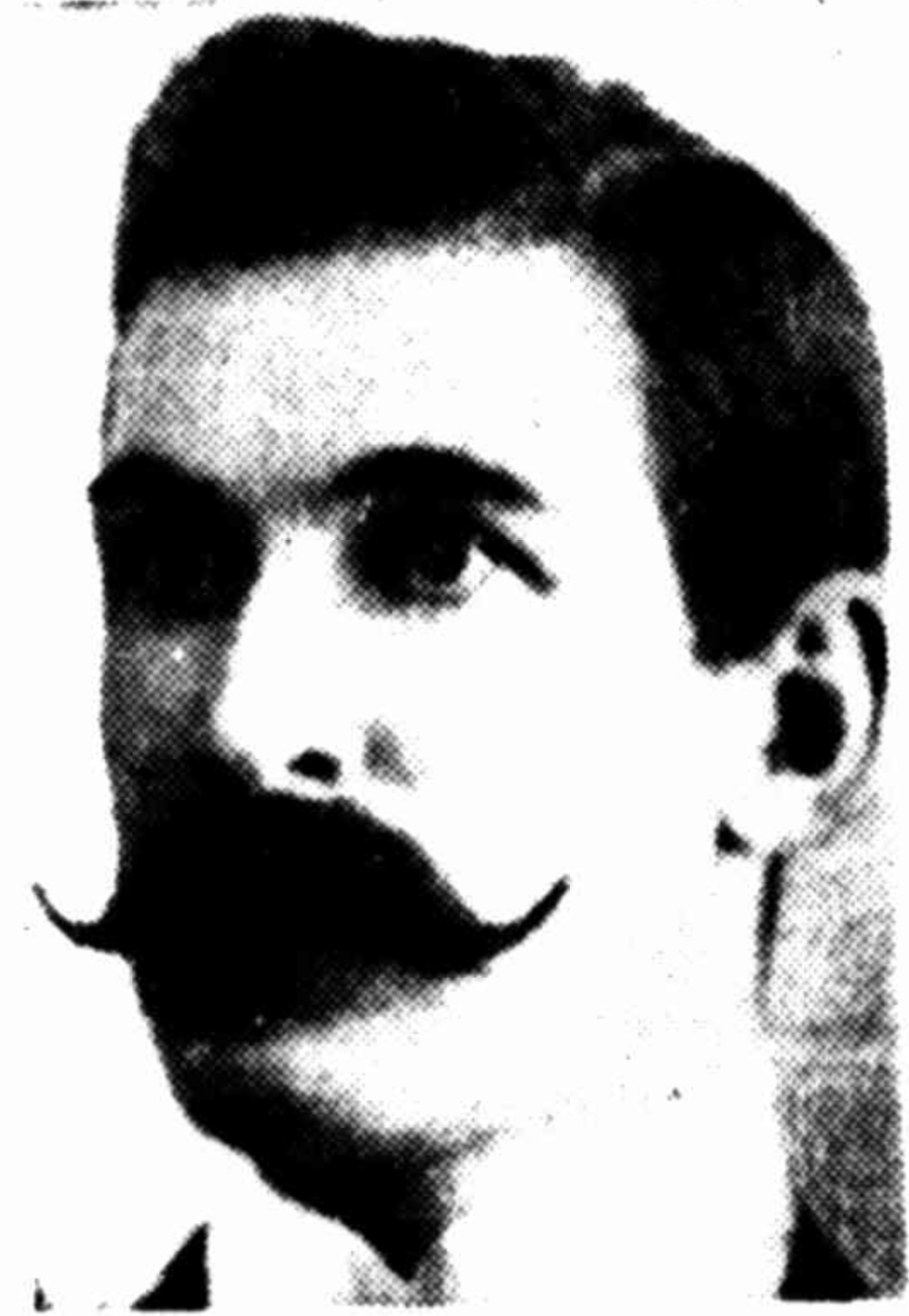
George Beachcroft

George Richard Peckham Beachcroft (1871 – 24 June 1941) was an influential early administrator of the Richmond Football Club.

He served as club secretary from 1900 to 1905, when Richmond was in the Victorian Football Association (VFA). During his tenure, the club won the VFA premierships of 1902 and 1905. With the club then in the Victorian Football League (VFL), the election of Jack Archer's reform group saw Beachcroft return to Richmond, once again as club secretary, for one season in 1912. He was also secretary of the Melbourne Football Club for one season, in 1907.

He was made a life member of the Richmond Football Club in 1906.

Beachcroft was also a founding member of the Richmond Rowing Club and general secretary of the Victorian Junior Cricket Association.
