= Leslie Pressnell =

British monetary historian

- Born: 11 November 1922; London, U.K.
- Died: 6 September 2011 (aged 88)
- Education: London School of Economics
- Occupation: Historian
- Spouse: Sheila Hopkins
- Children: 2 sons

Leslie Pressnell (11 November 1922 – 6 September 2011) was a British monetary historian. He taught at the University of Exeter, University College London, his alma mater the London School of Economics, City, University of London, and finally the University of Kent, where he was Professor of Economic and Social History. He authored several books.

== Selected works ==
- Pressnell, Leslie (1956). Country Banking in the Industrial Revolution. Oxford, U.K.: Clarendon Press. OCLC 41449884.
- Pressnell, Leslie (1986). The Post-war Financial Settlement. London, U.K.: H.M.S.O. ISBN 9780116301864. OCLC 256444204.
