= LateRooms.com =

Hotel reservation website

- Type: Subsidiary
- Industry: Travel
- Founded: 1999; 27 years ago
- Founders: Steven, Paul, Tony Walsh; Chris Allen
- Headquarters: London, United Kingdom
- Key people: Snaptrip Group Ltd
- Products: Hotels and accommodation
- Owner: Snaptrip Group Limited

LateRooms.com is a hotel reservations website providing discounted accommodation throughout the UK, Europe and the rest of the world.

== Company history ==
LateRooms.com was launched in Salford, Greater Manchester, in 1999 by brothers Steven, Paul, Tony Walsh and Chris Allen The site originally started as a simple directory listing hotels, but in 2002 moved to enable users to book hotels online (some hotels require a telephone booking through LateRooms.com). In December 2006, the company was bought by First Choice Holidays plc in a deal worth between £108 million and £120 million. September 2007 saw First Choice Holidays plc merge with TUI Travel plc to form the TUI Travel Group.

In 2010 LateRooms.com moved to a new head office at The Peninsula building in Manchester, along with sister companies AsiaRooms.com and Hotels-London.co.uk.

In May 2015 TUI announced a restructure of all of its brands and that Laterooms would be sold off.

In October 2015, Cox & Kings acquired LateRooms.com for £8.5 million (approx Rs. 85 crore) However, in March 2016, it sold 100% of LateRooms Ltd (UK) ('LateRooms') to Enterprises UK Ltd. ('Malvern') for GBP 20 million.

On 1 August 2019 LateRooms.com announced they had ceased trading via Twitter and a message on their website, however the brand was purchased and revived by the Snaptrip Group and their website and social media subsequently came back online.
