= Hazardous area response team =

Specialist team in UK ambulance services

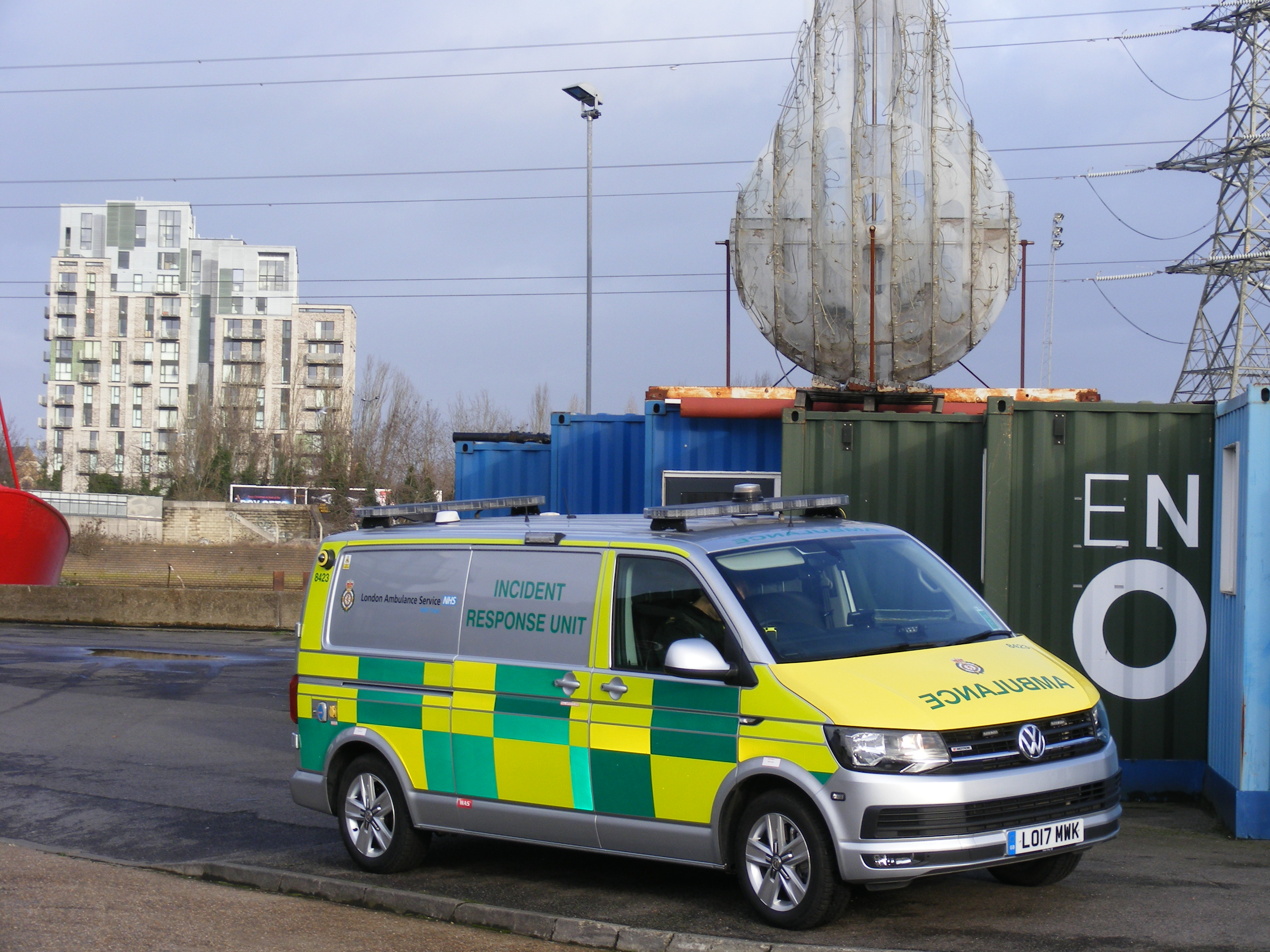
A response vehicle of the London Ambulance Service HART parked by Trinity Buoy Wharf in Poplar

The Hazardous Area Response Team or HART is a specialist unit found in each of the NHS ambulance services in England, Wales, and Northern Ireland devoted to providing medical care to patients in the "hot zone" of hazardous environments. Established in 2006, today there is a team in every ambulance trust in the constituent nations (as well as an equivalent in the Scottish Ambulance Service, the Special Operations Response Team) with specific capabilities for responding to major and hazardous incidents, including those involving hazardous materials, marauding terrorist attacks, and major building collapses or transport disasters.

== History ==
Historically, ambulance services in the United Kingdom have been relatively risk-averse; ambulance crews received little training or equipment to deal with incidents involving hazardous environments, instead relying on other agencies (such as the fire brigade) to remove casualties to the "cold zone" before being treated. A notable exception was during World War II, when first aid parties attached to the Civil Defence Service would frequently enter the remains of bombed-out buildings to rescue casualties in an early version of urban search and rescue. The issue of medical care in hazardous environments would not be a focus for the ambulance service again until the 1990s when, following the Tokyo subway sarin attack, ambulance services in major metropolitan areas such as London began to provide a decontamination capability for injured casualties (while mass decontamination remained a duty of the fire service).

Following the September 11th attacks in 2001 and the subsequent Global War on Terror, the British government, fearing that the UK would be a future target for terrorism, increased their investment in resilience and major incident capabilities for the emergency services; for the ambulance service, this began with their involvement in the 2003 Osiris II CBRN training exercise at Bank Underground station, but in 2004 the Hot Zone Working Project was established by the Ambulance Service Association to look into the possibility of training paramedics to enter the "hot zone" of hazardous incidents alongside the fire service. At the same time, the London Fire and Emergency Planning Authority began trialling the Multi-Agency Initial Assessment Team, a joint team made up of staff from the London Fire Brigade, London Ambulance Service, Metropolitan Police, and the City of London Police designed to respond to and provide initial assessment of major hazardous incidents, including those involving hazardous materials. The reports of both of these schemes were submitted in early 2005, but further reinforced by the 7/7 bombings in July, to which the MAIAT was deployed, where ambulance and medical personnel ventured down into the tunnels and bombed trains - in some cases against policy - leading to increased survival according to hospital clinicians.

Following the events of 7/7, the Department of Health officially launched the HART programme in August 2006; initially, the trial consisted of two teams each trained in a different capability: a team in London trained to deal with hazardous materials due to the risk of a CBRN attack on the capital, and a team in Yorkshire developing an Urban Search & Rescue capability at the request of the Chief Fire Officers Association; the first notable deployment was in 2007, when a building collapse in East London led to the deployment of the Yorkshire USAR team in the rubble pile alongside the fire service. Following the conclusion of the trial, the two separate capabilities were rolled into one, and each ambulance service in England was funded to establish a team, with the following years seeing the addition of Inland Water Operations and Tactical Medical Operations to the teams' repertoire. The establishment of a HART each in Northern Ireland and Wales followed suit in 2011 and 2012 respectively.

== Organisation and capabilities ==
National responsibility for the HART programme has been the responsibility of the National Ambulance Resilience Unit (NARU) since 2011, when responsibility was handed over from the Department of Health. NARU is hosted by one of the ambulance trusts in rotation, and as of 2026, is currently hosted by the London Ambulance Service. A hazardous area response team itself consists of seven shifts of staff (6 paramedics and 1 team leader) for a total of 42 staff, of which at least half must have additional USAR training; some larger services maintain more than one HART to account for a wider geographic service area or increased risk.

The capabilities of HART have expanded since its creation to encompass a wide range of capabilities, including:

- HazMat/CBRN(e) - Response to incidents involving hazardous materials, biological threats, or radiation from a variety of causes, including industrial or transportation accidents, terrorism, and outbreaks of High-Consequence Infectious Diseases
- Urban Search & Rescue - Working within confined spaces and compromised structures, such as following a building collapse or an incident below ground, e.g. in a sewer or railway tunnel
- Safe Working at Height - Using rope rescue skills and fall arrest equipment to conduct treatment and rescues in high environments, both in the built and the natural environment
- Unstable Terrain - Response to incidents in difficult-to-access areas, such as on rubble piles or in remote and challenging natural environments, including the use of all-terrain vehicles
- Water Operations - Response to incidents in and around open water, including training as swift water rescue technicians, use of rescue craft, flood response, and response to incidents on craft at sea
- Tactical Medical Operations - Response to incidents involving weapons and violence, both spontaneously (e.g. to marauding terrorist attacks) or planned Support to Security Operations such as raids, including of clandestine labs

HART has been established in every ambulance service in England, Scotland, and Wales; their bases and number of teams are shown below.

| Ambulance Service | Base/Station | Area Served |
|---|---|---|
| East of England Ambulance Service (EEAS) | Melbourn | Bedfordshire, Cambridgeshire, & Hertfordshire |
| East of England Ambulance Service (EEAS) | Great Notley | Essex & East Anglia |
| East Midlands Ambulance Service (EMAS) | Mansfield | East Midlands |
| London Ambulance Service (LAS) | Cody Road | East London |
| London Ambulance Service (LAS) | Clock Tower Road | West London |
| North East Ambulance Service (NEAS) | Monkton | North-East England |
| North West Ambulance Service (NWAS) | Ashburton Point | Greater Manchester |
| North West Ambulance Service (NWAS) | Croxteth | Cheshire and Merseyside |
| Northern Ireland Ambulance Service (NIAS) | Lissue | Northern Ireland |
| South Central Ambulance Service (SCAS) | Eastleigh | South Central England |
| South East Coast Ambulance Service (SECAmb) | Gatwick | Sussex & Surrey |
| South East Coast Ambulance Service (SECAmb) | Ashford | Kent & Channel Tunnel |
| South Western Ambulance Service (SWAS) | Filton | Dorset & Somerset |
| South Western Ambulance Service (SWAS) | Exeter | Devon & Cornwall |
| Yorkshire Ambulance Service (YAS) | Manor Mill | Yorkshire |
| West Midlands Ambulance Service (WMAS) | Oldbury | West Midlands |
| Welsh Ambulance Service (WAS) | Bryncethin | Wales |

There also exists amongst UK ambulance services Special Operations Response Teams, with this term having a different meaning in different constituent nations; in England, Wales, and Northern Ireland, a SORT is a group of ambulance staff with extra training in order to deliver certain hazardous response capabilities in a part-time fashion when called out, while still working day-to-day in a different role. Common roles undertaken by SORTs include providing a clinical decontamination capability in the "warm zone" of a HazMat/CBRN incident for contaminated casualties, and forming an Ambulance Intervention Team for response to a marauding terrorist attack. In Scotland however, SORTs are the equivalent to HARTs in the other constituent nations, that is, full-time clinicians with extensive training in the response to hazardous incidents. The bases of these SORTs are:

| Ambulance Service | Base/Station | Area Served |
|---|---|---|
| Scottish Ambulance Service | North of Scotland SORT Base, Aberdeen | North Scotland |
| Scottish Ambulance Service | SORT Base, Dundee | North Scotland |
| Scottish Ambulance Service | East of Scotland SORT Base, Newbridge | East Scotland |
| Scottish Ambulance Service | West of Scotland SORT Base, Johnstone | West Scotland |

== Equipment ==
The first generation of HART’s used a variety of different vehicles, often independently purchased by each of the ambulance trusts; popular choices included Iveco Daily Incident Response Units, Land Rover Discovery and Nissan Navara 4x4 utility vehicles, and Volvo XC70 rapid response vehicles. However, in 2016, nationally-standardised vehicles came into use following the establishment of a national specification by NARU, with the fleet of vehicles including:

- Primary Response Vehicles (Volkswagen Transporter T6) for initial management or small incidents, usually 3 per team
- Secondary Response Vehicles (Mercedes-Benz Sprinter 3rd Gen) carrying less commonly used equipment, usually 3 per team
- Welfare Vehicles (Mercedes-Benz Sprinter 3rd Gen) equipped with drink and snack making facilities, usually 1 per team
- ATV Transporters (DAF LF) carrying a 6x6 Polaris Ranger ATV, usually 1 per team
- Personnel Carriers ((Mercedes-Benz Sprinter 3rd Gen), usually 2 per team

The third generation of HART vehicles arrived in 2025 with the introduction of a new set of vehicles, with the PRV and SRV functions once again being combined into a singular incident response unit, as well as the provision of an off-road IRU for the first time. The vehicles included in this new generation are:

- Incident Response Units (MAN TGE)
- Personnel Carriers (MAN TGE)
- Logistics Vehicles
- Welfare Units
- Off-Road Incident Response Units (Toyota Hilux 8th Gen)

While HARTs carry a plethora of extra rescue equipment and PPE for operation in hazardous areas, they also have extra clinical equipment and skills. For example, HARTs carry flexible stretchers such as Multi-Integrated Body Splint (MIBS), Mass Oxygen Delivery Systems to deliver care at mass casualty incidents, and basic ventilators with CBRN filters to free up hands from the use of a bag valve mask. In addition, HART paramedics often have a slightly wider scope than other paramedics (though this varies from trust to trust), being able to give a wider range of drugs via patient group directions, including: combined atropine and pralidoxime injectors (for treatment of nerve agent poisoning), dexamethasone & beclomethasone (for treatment of upper airway spasm and inflammation following chemical exposure), diphoterine (for neutralisation of corrosive burns), dicobalt edetate (for treatment of cyanide poisoning), and ketamine (for treatment of severe pain from crush and burn injuries).

== Notable incidents ==
- Warwickshire warehouse fire (2007) – A warehouse fire in Atherstone on Stour led to the deaths of 4 firefighters; YAS HART were called in to search through the partially collapsed warehouse to recover the firefighters.
- Gleision Colliery mining accident (2011) – An explosion in a colliery in Cilybebyll killed 4 miners and injured 1 other; WAS and English HARTs entered the mine alongside fire service and Mines Rescue Service personnel to search for the missing miners.
- M5 motorway crash (2011) – A multiple-vehicle collision and subsequent explosion on the M5 near Taunton killed 7 and injured 51; SWAS HART were deployed to work in and around vehicles due to the threat from fire.
- Summer Olympics and Paralympics (2012) – The LAS was involved in intensive preparation for the risk of major disaster or terrorism during the games, with HART especially training and being pre-emptively deployed in large numbers during the games.
- Glasgow helicopter crash (2013) – The crash of a police helicopter into a pub killed 10 and injured 31; two Special Operations Response Teams of the Scottish Ambulance Service were deployed, alongside 31 ambulances.
- Wales NATO summit (2014) – WAS HART played a significant role in preparing for the summit in Newport, preparing for the risk of an attack on world leaders at the event.
- Westminster attack (2017) – A vehicle-ramming and knife attack killed 6 (including the perpetrator) and injured 48; LAS HART responded to the scene, including to casualties thrown into the River Thames.
- Manchester Arena bombing (2017) – A suicide bombing killed 23 and injured hundreds more; NWAS was heavily criticised by the subsequent inquiry for numerous failings, including delays in dispatching HART, failure to deploy HART into the City Room where the majority of the injured were, failure to conduct triage, and failures in inter-agency communication and coordination. The inquiry eventually ruled that 2 of the victims could have survived if the emergency response was up to standard.
- London Bridge attack (2017) – A second vehicle-ramming and knife attack in the year killed 11 (including the 3 perpetrators) and injured 41; LAS HART deployed into the hot zone of the incident, further than would normally be accepted, however the subsequent Coroner's Inquest found that confusion around where paramedics could be deployed under Operation Plato rules may have delayed care, leading to new joint plans being drawn up between police and ambulance services.
- Finsbury Park van attack (2017) – A vehicle-ramming attack killed 1 and injured 11; LAS HART deployed to the scene.
- Parsons Green train bombing (2017) – A failed bombing on a tube train injured 30; LAS HART deployed to the scene.
- Salisbury poisoning (2018) – The attempted assassination with Novichok of double agent Sergei Skripal by Russian intelligence officers seriously injured 3 people (Sergei, his daughter, and a police officer) and minorly injured 2 more; SWAS HART and a mutual aid HART from YAS provided support to the investigation and clean-up operation following the incident.
- Amesbury poisonings (2018) – The accidental poisoning of 2 people, of which 1 died, resulted from nerve agent being left over from the previous Salisbury poisoning; HART were called in by the initial ambulance crew, but cancelled due to police not believing that the incident was due to chemical weapons but instead drugs, and arranging the removal of the casualties prior to SWAS HART attending.
- London Bridge stabbings (2019) – A mass stabbing killed 3 (including the perpetrator) and injured 3 more; LAS HART deployed to the scene.
- Reading stabbings (2020) – A mass stabbing killed 3 and injured 3 others; SCAS HART deployed to the scene, and the delay in SCAS being told of the police declaration of a terrorist attack was highlighted at the inquest.
- COP26 United Nations Climate Change Conference (2021) – Both Scottish SORTs and English HARTs were on-hand engaged in planning for an emergency at the conference.
- Plymouth shooting (2021) – A mass shooting in Keyham killed 6 (including the perpetrator) and injured 2 more; SWAS HART responded to the scene alongside 4 air ambulances.
- St Helier explosion (2022) – A suspected gas explosion in Jersey killed 10 and injured 2 more; SWAS HART was flown to the island dependency by RAF and Coastguard helicopters to help search the rubble of the housing block.
- Creeslough explosion (2022) – A suspected gas explosion in the Republic of Ireland killed 10 and injured 8 more; NIAS HART was dispatched across the Irish border to rescue trapped casualties, alongside Air Ambulance Northern Ireland.
- Southport stabbing (2024) – A mass stabbing at a dance studio killed 3 and injured 10; NWAS HART responded alongside 13 ambulances and 3 air ambulances.
- Manchester synagogue attack (2025) – A car and knife attack killed 3 (including the perpetrator and one victim accidentally shot by police) and injured 3 others (including another shot by police); NWAS HART deployed to the incident in ballistic protective gear alongside Greater Manchester Police firearms officers.

== See also ==
- New Dimension programme
