= Morrison Facilities Services =

Morrison Facilities Services plc
- Company type: Subsidiary
- Founded: 2006
- Defunct: 2012
- Headquarters: Stevenage
- Website: www.mearsgroup.co.uk

Morrison Facilities Services was a United Kingdom based company that specialised in providing facilities services to private businesses and central and local government bodies.

The core area of the business was repair and maintenance of social housing. It was a subsidiary of Anglian Water Group until acquired and (later) merged by Mears Group in 2012.

== History ==
In September 2000, Morrison Construction was purchased by Anglian Water Group Plc and subsequently delisted.

The construction division of the business was sold in 2006 to Galliford Try. The remainder of the business was split into two divisions, Morrison Facilities Services and Morrison Utility Services. Two years later, AWG sold the Utility Services division to two private equity firms, Cognetas and Englefield Capital for £235 million.

The company launched a business partnership in September 2006 with Manchester City Council, which lasted for ten years. The contract was extended for £20 million July 2010 for an additional two years and eight months.

AWG sold Morrison Facilities Services in 2012 to Mears Group for £24 million.
