= Gregory Fitzgerald =

Gregory Fitzgerald is the name of:

- Gregory Fitzgerald, Australian competitor in wrestling at the 1996 Summer Olympics – Men's freestyle 52 kg
- Greg Fitzgerald (born 1964), British business executive
