= Glasgow attack =

Glasgow attack may refer to:

- Glasgow pub bombings in 1979
- 2007 Glasgow Airport attack
- Glasgow hotel stabbings in 2020
