= Anglian Water Group =

AWG Group Limited
- Trade name: Anglian Water Group
- Type: Private
- Industry: Water
- Founded: 1973
- Headquarters: Huntingdon, England
- Website: awg.com

AWG Group Limited, trading as Anglian Water Group, is a British holding company which is parent to Anglian Water. It was previously listed on the London Stock Exchange, and was a member of the FTSE 250 Index, but it is now owned by the Osprey Consortium. Its headquarters are in Huntingdon, Cambridgeshire.

== History ==
Originally Anglian Water, the company was one of the British regional water companies privatised in 1989.

Like many utility companies, AWG has attempted to diversify away from a core business which offers steady profits but has very limited potential for expansion, in its case through the acquisition in September 2000, of the Scottish support service and construction group Morrison Construction.

In March 2006, the construction division of the Morrison business was sold to Galliford Try for £42m. The remainder of the business was split into two divisions, Morrison Facilities Services and Morrison Utilities Services, and, in March 2008, AWG sold Morrison Utility Services to two private equity firms, Cognetas and Englefield Capital for £235 million.

AWG was acquired by the Osprey Consortium, made up of Canada Pension Plan Investment Board, Colonial First State, Industry Funds Management and 3i, in December 2006 for £2.25bn.

In 2012, AWG sold Morrison Facilities Services to Mears Group for £24m.

== Subsidiaries ==
AWG plc own a subsidiary called Anglian Venture Holdings, who are a holding company for AWP plc commercial ventures outside of their core water utility supply business, these additional subsidiaries include:

| Subsidiary name | Area of business |
|---|---|
| Alpheus | Water and waste water solutions design and build |
| Celtic Anglian Water | Irish water and waste water contractor |
| Geodesys | Conveyancing Services |
| Digdat | Asset Protection and mapping service |
| AWG Property | Property company utilising surplus Anglian Water land assets |
| Anglian Water Direct | Drain and water utility insurance |
