= Morrison Construction =

UK construction company

- Logo in use until 2006
- Company type: Subsidiary
- Founded: 1948
- Founder: Alex Morrison
- Headquarters: Edinburgh, Scotland
- Parent: Galliford Try
- Website: www.morrisonconstruction.co.uk

Morrison Construction is a large Scottish based construction business, which was acquired by Galliford Try in 2006.

== History ==
Morrison Construction was founded by Alex Morrison in Tain, Scotland in 1948. Although ownership of the company would pass through several hands during the 20th and 21st centuries, the Morrison family maintained a presence at the business for over 50 years. During 1974, an 80 percent stake, and thus control of the firm, was sold to Consolidated African Selection Trust.

During 1989, brothers Fraser and Gordon Morrison undertook a management buy-out of the firm, acquiring Morrison Construction from Charter Consolidated along with the businesses of Biggs Wall and Shand Construction in the process. One of this first moves was to return the group's headquarters to Edinburgh. Despite the hardships encountered by most of the British construction sector throughout the early 1990s recession, Morrison Construction reported strong growth during this period as well as being a profitable going concern.

In September 1995, Morrison Construction plc was floated on the London Stock Exchange, during which it was valued at almost £77 million while Fraser and Gordon Morrison each retained a 27.3 per cent shareholding. By this point, the firm was steadily shifting away from traditional competitive tender work in favour of other business avenues, including building and property development, civil engineering, utility and energy, housebuilding, and private finance initiative schemes.

In September 2000, the company was purchased by Anglian Water Group Plc in exchange for £235 million; its new parent company stated that the move would permit it to provide an all-round service of designing, constructing and managing facilities. However, over the following three years, a series of write-downs on the firm's value were enacted. During February 2003, Anglia Water Group launched legal action against Morrison's former chairman, Sir Fraser Morrison, along with other senior figures, alleging that they had misrepresented the firm's fiscal performance to an extent that amounted to fraud. This action cumulated in a confidential out of court settlement.

During early 2006, the business was split into three divisions, Morrison Construction, Morrison Facilities Services and Morrison Utility Services; the latter two businesses were retained for a time by Anglian Water Group, while the construction division was acquired by the rival construction firm Galliford Try for £42 million. Two years later, Morrison Utility Services was divested by Anglian Water Group, the management of which were seeking a return to being a pure utility company. Finally, in 2012, rival contractor Mears Group purchased Morrison Facilities Services from Anglian Water Group for £24 million.

Throughout the early 2010s, Galliford Try backed Morrison Construction's plans to expand its central Scotland building business. Various types of civil works were undertaken by the firm during this period; such projects included windfarms, schools, and flood defences.

== Major projects ==
Major projects included the Kylesku Bridge, completed in 1982, the Dornoch Firth Bridge, completed in 1991, the Landshut Bridge, completed in 2014, Nucleus, the Nuclear and Caithness Archives, completed in 2017, and the Queensferry Crossing, completed in 2017.
