= Vistry Group =

British housebuilding company

Vistry Group PLC
- Formerly: Bovis Homes
- Type: Public
- Traded as: LSE: VTY; FTSE 250 component
- Industry: Housebuilding
- Founded: 1965
- Headquarters: Kings Hill, England
- Key people: Greg Fitzgerald, Chairman and CEO
- Revenue: ▼£3,613.7 million (2025)
- Operating income: ▲£222.6 million (2025)
- Net income: ▲£193.9 million (2025)
- Website: www.vistrygroup.co.uk

Vistry Group PLC, formerly Bovis Homes Group PLC, is a British home construction company based in Kings Hill, England. Bovis Homes completed a deal to acquire Galliford Try's housing arm in January 2020, renaming the combined business Vistry. It is listed on the London Stock Exchange and is a constituent of the FTSE 250 Index. It is one of the biggest housebuilders in the UK.

Vistry issued three profit warnings in late 2024, and was removed from the FTSE 100 share index. It has continued to struggle financially and in 2026, as average daily debt climbed towards £800m, began a major restructuring and cost-cutting programme.

== History ==
Vistry Group was the result of a 2019 merger of Bovis Homes and Galliford Try's housing businesses.

=== Bovis Homes ===
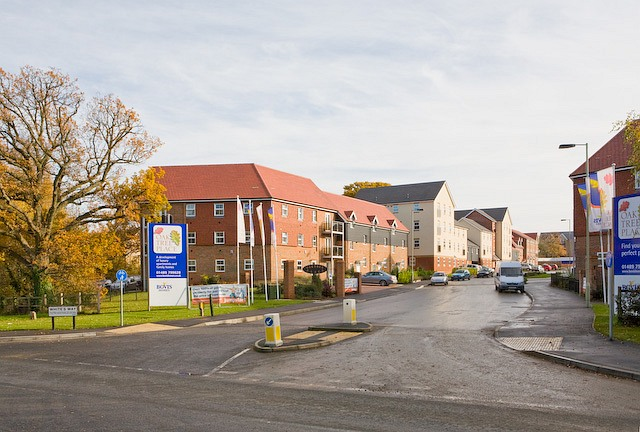
A Bovis Homes development near Southampton

Bovis Homes’ origins lay in the early post-war housing operations of Bovis Holdings (see also Bovis Construction). Bovis had been acquiring housing land in the early 1950s but the level of housebuilding was modest until 1967 when it acquired Frank Sanderson’s Malcolm Sanderson Developments and the much larger RT Warren. Frank Sanderson rapidly expanded Bovis’s housing through acquisition including the quoted Page-Johnson and Varney Holdings; by 1973, Bovis was probably the country’s second or third largest housebuilder, with sales of over 2,600.

The secondary banking crisis adversely affected Bovis Holdings’ banking subsidiary and the Group had to be rescued by P&O in March 1974. Frank Sanderson left Bovis in 1973 and Philip Warner was appointed managing director of Bovis Homes, a position he held for 25 years. During the 1970s, Bovis reduced its housing volumes as it concentrated on rebuilding profitability, but it began to expand again in the 1980s. The company was demerged from P&O and was floated on the London Stock Exchange as Bovis Homes in 1997.

On 9 January 2017, Bovis announced that its chief executive David Ritchie, who had been at the company for 18 years, had stepped down with immediate effect; he was quoted to have said that it was time for someone new to lead the group. The company was subsequently subject to negative national press coverage around quality issues, was the target of two takeover bids and saw its HBF customer survey rating - a benchmark for housebuilding quality and customer service - drop to two out of five stars. Former Galliford Try CEO Greg Fitzgerald took over as chief executive on 18 April 2017. In September 2017, he announced a strategic review of the business. In March 2019, the company announced that it has returned to four-star status in the annual HBF survey.

=== Galliford Try housing operations ===
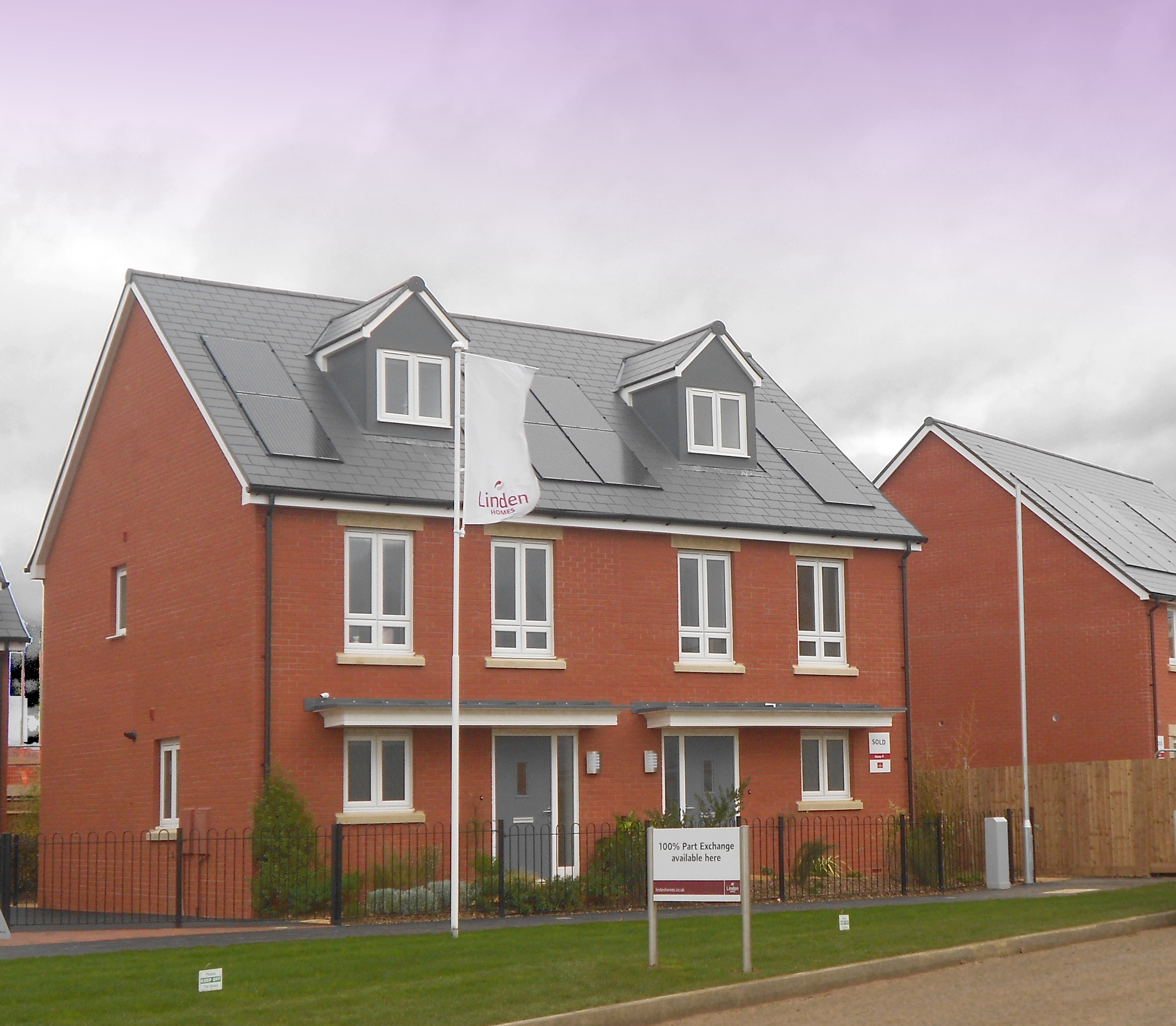
A Linden Homes development in Bishop's Cleeve, Gloucestershire

Galliford Try was formed in 2000 through a merger of Try Group plc, founded in 1908 in London, and Galliford plc, founded in 1916. Between 2005 and 2015, the company was led by Fitzgerald. The company expanded its housing operations business acquiring Gerald Wood Homes in 2001, Chartdale in January 2006, Kendall Cross in November 2007, Linden Homes in February 2008, Rosemullion Homes in December 2009 and Shepherd Homes in May 2015. All the individual house building divisions were rebranded as Linden Homes in 2011.

=== Merger of Bovis Homes and Galliford Try's housing businesses ===
On 24 May 2019, Galliford Try's board rejected a £950m offer from Bovis Homes for the Linden Homes and Partnerships & Regeneration businesses. Talks reopened in September 2019, with a preliminary deal, valued at £1.075bn, reportedly agreed. On 7 November, it was reported that Bovis Homes had agreed a share and cash deal that valued Galliford Try's housing businesses at £1.1bn. The deal was completed on 3 January 2020, with Bovis Homes - which had applied to be renamed Vistry Group - set to operate with both the Bovis Homes and Linden Homes brands, a combination that CEO Fitzgerald said "creates a top five housebuilder in the UK with the capacity to deliver over 12,000 homes per year in the medium term".

=== Vistry Group ===
Trading in the company's shares under the new name, Vistry Group plc, commenced on 6 January 2020. Vistry Partnerships' first project wins included a £66m project on the Aylesbury Estate redevelopment at Elephant & Castle in south London, and the first phase of Enfield Council's Meridian Water development. Post-merger streamlining led to around 100 jobs being lost as Vistry reorganised 17 regional business units to 13.

During the 2020 COVID-19 pandemic, Vistry initially furloughed the majority of its employees and suspended construction activities, before recommencing work on most of its sites in late April and early May. On 20 May, Vistry said it was operating on 119 out of its 172 house-building developments, and on all 73 sites where it was building for other developers, including housing associations. Integration of the Linden and Bovis businesses continued and further headcount reduction was expected. The company was criticised for exploiting the COVID-19 downturn by seeking discounts from subcontractors.

In February 2022, Vistry was reported to be among the slowest payers of its subcontractors in a Build UK report based on government data, taking an average of 44 days to settle invoices, with 15% of its invoices still not settled after 60 days.

In September 2022, Vistry was reported to be offering a £1.24 billion cash and shares deal to acquire competitor Countryside Partnerships. The deal, backed by both boards and by five major shareholders at Countryside holding 39% of the company, would create one of the UK's biggest home builders with revenue of over £3bn. Countryside shareholders would receive 0.255 of a Vistry share for each of their shares plus 60p. Vistry CEO Greg Fitzgerald said the Countryside brand would be retained if the takeover was approved by shareholders. The takeover was completed on 11 November 2022.

In August 2023, shareholders were asked to approve a £2.2m pay rise for CEO Greg Fitzgerald, and his remuneration package was only narrowly approved, with just 54.8% in favour. In January 2024, it was announced that Fitzgerald would, in addition to being CEO, become executive chair of the company when Ralph Findlay steps down on 16 May 2024. Some shareholders expressed unrest about Fitzgerald's combined role, a departure from the UK Corporate Governance Code, with one-in-five voting against his re-election in May 2024; Vistry also commissioned an evaluation to assess the combined role of CEO and chair, to be reported in March 2025. Fitzgerald subsequently abolished the role of chief operating officer; Earl Sibley left the business in November 2024.

In February 2024, Vistry was among eight UK house-builders targeted by the Competition and Markets Authority in an investigation into suspected breaches of competition law. The CMA said it had evidence that firms shared commercially sensitive information with competitors, influencing the build-out of sites and the prices of new homes. In January 2025, the CMA said it was conducting further investigations into suspected anti-competitive conduct by seven house-builders (Barratt's acquisition of Redrow had reduced the number from eight to seven). In June 2025, the CMA investigation was extended to August 2025. In July 2025, the housebuilders offered to pay £100 million towards affordable housing programme as part of an agreement to reform practices on information sharing and to end the investigation without admitting any liability or wrongdoing. The CMA subsequently initiated a consultation on whether to accept the offer. On 30 October 2025, the CMA confirmed its investigation had been dropped in return for a £100m payment towards affordable homes and other measures including the development of industry-wide guidance on information sharing and agreements not to share certain types of information with other housebuilders.

In September 2024, Vistry forecast it would deliver more than 18,000 homes (later revised downwards to 17,500), surpassing Barratt (14,000) to become Britain's biggest house-builder (this was before finalisation of Barratt's merger with Redrow). It expected to complete one-in-six of the UK's affordable homes in 2024.

On 8 October 2024, Vistry issued a £115m profit warning after under-estimating build costs on nine out of 46 schemes in its southern division by around 10%. The announcement caused Vistry shares to drop in value in early stock market trading, eventually closing at 963.5 pence - a 25% fall, knocking about £1bn off the company's value. An additional £50m profit warning was issued on 8 November 2024 after further under-estimated build costs were identified in the same division, taking the total of affected sites to 18. Vistry issued a third profit warning on 24 December 2024, when its shares dropped 16.2% in value, closing at a two-year low of 547.5p. The third profit warning was described by investment broker Investec as "an unexpected nasty surprise" capping "a very poor end to 2024 for the Group". In March 2026, the Financial Reporting Council launched an investigation into two former Vistry accountants at its South Division relating to financial reporting in the 2023 and 2024 financial years.

In January 2025, following the problems in its southern division, Vistry announced it was revising its operational structure from six to three divisions to reduce reporting lines and allow Fitzgerald to get closer to the business. The firm had also tightened up commercial assurance procedures for monthly site cost reviews. In March 2025, Vistry reported pre-tax profit had slumped to £105m from £293m previously on revenue down 6% to £3.8bn. Profitability had been impaired by the cost forecasting issues in its southern division, impacting profit by £92m. Total completions were up 7% to 17,225 units.

In March 2026, Vistry announced Fitzgerald would step down as chair in May 2026 (to be replaced by Rob Woodward) but would continue as CEO for up to 12 months, or until a successor was appointed (in April 2026, Adam Daniels was announced as Vistry's new CEO). In the year to 31 December 2025, Vistry's pre-tax profits increased to £196.2m from £104.9m on a turnover of £3.6bn.

Also in March 2026, Fitzgerald bought 219,377 Vistry shares after they slumped more than 20% to a near-decade low following a warning about 2026 profit margins. From trading at 730p on 12 February 2026, Vistry's share price dropped over the ensuing three months, with a sharp fall from 331.2p to 264p in May 2026 following a profit warning and increased short-selling of its shares. In June 2026, Vistry - battling with slow private housing demand, rising build costs and pressure on margins - offered staff voluntary redundancy in an effort to preserve cash and cut debt. In July 2026, Vistry warned that it would report a first-half pre-tax loss of around £30m.

In September 2026, Vistry reported a £661m statutory pre-tax loss for the first half of 2026, incorporating a £475m goodwill impairment and £73m for further building safety work. CEO Adam Daniels revealed plans to reduce its 25 operating regions down to 12, shrink annual housing output to around 12,000 homes, and pull out of open-market housing in southeast England to concentrate on the North, Midlands and West. First-half completions fell 8% to 6,304 homes. Adjusted revenue fell 9% to £1.7bn. In November 2026, as Vistry's average daily debt climbed towards £800m, housing minister Matthew Pennycook said the UK government had no plans to buy or nationalise the company as it cut an unspecified number of jobs and struggled to control its borrowing.

== Operations ==
Prior to the Galliford Try deal which established Vistry, Bovis Homes operated seven regional businesses and built properties ranging from one-bedroom apartments to six-bedroom executive houses. It had offices in Kings Hill, Basingstoke, Reading, Exeter, Bishop's Cleeve, Stafford, Coleshill and Milton Keynes.

In April 2018, Bovis launched its Phoenix Range of 28 house types for both private and affordable housing.

In February 2019, the company announced that it was going to launch its Partnership Housing Division to work closely with housing associations seeking new ways to support the traditional affordable housing delivery and to facilitate a quicker delivery of larger housing association schemes.

In September 2023, following falling private market sales, Vistry began to restructure the group to become a partnerships-only housing business, cutting regional business units from 32 to 27, split across six new operating regions (later reduced to three).

In December 2025, it was announced that Vistry had exchanged contracts to acquire a 33.75-acre site at Yarnton, near Oxford, with outline planning permission for a mixed-tenure development of up to 540 homes. The site, allocated in the Cherwell Local Plan, includes provision for affordable housing, community and elderly care facilities, and supporting infrastructure, with further planning approvals expected from 2026.

== Reputation ==
=== Bovis Homes ===
Following the resignation of David Ritchie as CEO on 9 January 2017, shortly after the company had issued a profit warning following a slow-down in sales in December 2016, Bovis Homes faced controversy when newspapers reported it had offered cash incentives to customers to complete purchases and move into unfinished new homes.

After a troubled period of increased press coverage of complaints from customers about perceived shortcuts of quality of homes built by the company as well as the formation of a Facebook group by unhappy customers called "Bovis Homes Victims Group", which also had a YouTube channel, Bovis Homes interim CEO Earl Sibley acknowledged that their customer service levels had failed to meet the expected standards. He announced that the company would set aside £7m, to compensate customers who had been affected by finding problems with their new homes.

On 9 December 2017, The Guardian reported that Bovis faced a potential class-action lawsuit by a group of homebuyers which had secured over 3,000 members. On 19 April 2018 Bovis Homes were hit with fresh accusations of continued quality issues and poor customer service, misleading buyers, "deliberately" delaying essential repairs, failing adequately to repair defects and engaging in "underhand behaviour" to limit bad publicity. The Times reported that the previous year Bovis was forced to apologise to customers for poor workmanship after the newspaper revealed that hundreds of buyers had complained of bouncing and vibrating floors, leaks, missing insulation panels, poor drainage and unfinished gardens.

The Times reported that the company set aside more than £10 million to deal with the complaints, but customers said service standards remained appalling. A whistleblower who worked as a customer service manager said he feared that construction problems were so common that the company might need to spend significantly more. The problems contributed to Bovis becoming the only national builder to be awarded a two-star rating out of five in the Home Builders Federation (HBF) annual customer satisfaction survey for the year ending September 2017. The newspaper reported that when The Times did a mystery shop on eight Bovis developments, all bar one claimed to have a star rating of three or above. Half claimed the company had four or five stars. The Times also reported that homebuyers were prevented from talking to the media by non-disclosure clauses. On 10 May 2018, The Independent reported fresh allegations of home buyers being offered incentives including shopping vouchers for the positive feedback.

Bovis Homes claims to have been focused on turning the business around and repairing its reputation for build quality and customer service. In March 2019 Bovis Homes were awarded four-star housebuilder status by the HBF following its annual customer satisfaction survey.

=== Vistry Group ===
In February 2023, Vistry was criticised by local residents for planning to fell more than 50 ancient trees in Wellingborough. Local MP Peter Bone and North Northamptonshire Council both called for a pause to the works, but these calls were unsuccessful.
