= Landshut Bridge =

Bridge in Moray, Scotland

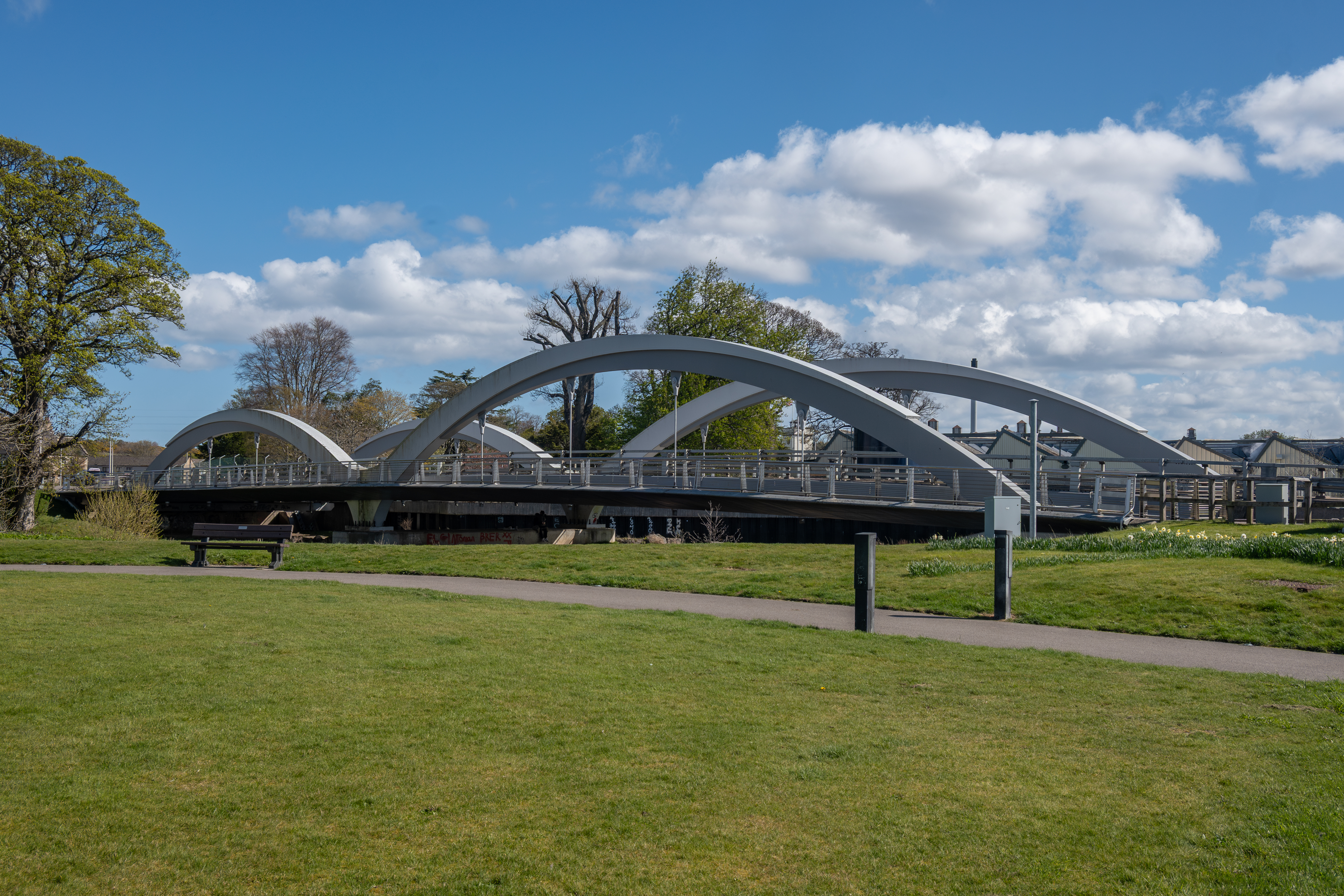
- Landshut bridge in 2024
- Coordinates: 57°39′1.8″N 3°18′12.96″W
- Crosses: River Lossie
- Locale: Moray
- Named for: Bridge in Landshut, Germany

Characteristics
- Total length: 75 metres (246 ft)

History
- Construction start: 2011
- Construction end: 2014

Location
- Interactive map of Landshut Bridge

Landshut Bridge is a road bridge in Elgin, Moray, Scotland which crosses the River Lossie. The bridge is named after Landshut in Bavaria, Germany, a twin town of Elgin.

== History ==
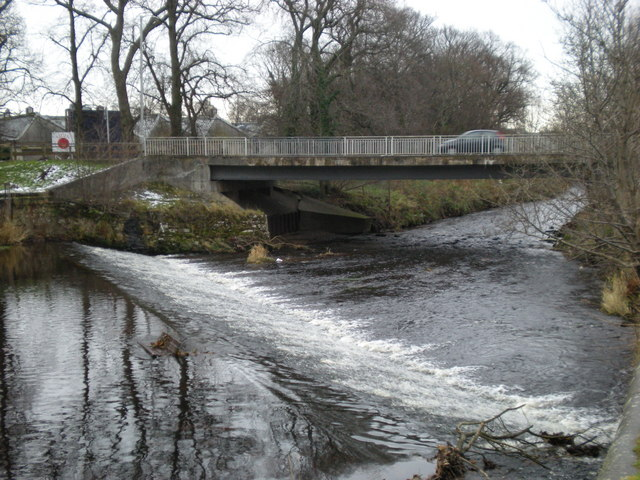
The previous bridge

The bridge was designed as part of the Elgin Flood Alleviation Scheme as a replacement for Pansport Bridge, which was in the same location. Landshut Bridge is longer and has an additional span in order to cross a second channel of the River Lossie added as part of the flood alleviation project.

Construction began in 2011. A temporary bridge was installed adjacent to the construction site to allow Pansport Bridge to be demolished and Landshut Bridge to be constructed. The bridge was completed in July 2014.

== Design ==
The bridge is 75 metres (246 feet) long and has two spans. The deck is cable-suspended. The main contractor was Morrison Construction and the steelwork was erected by the Cleveland Bridge & Engineering Company.

== See also ==
- List of bridges in Scotland
