= Tokheim =

American manufacturer of fuel dispensers

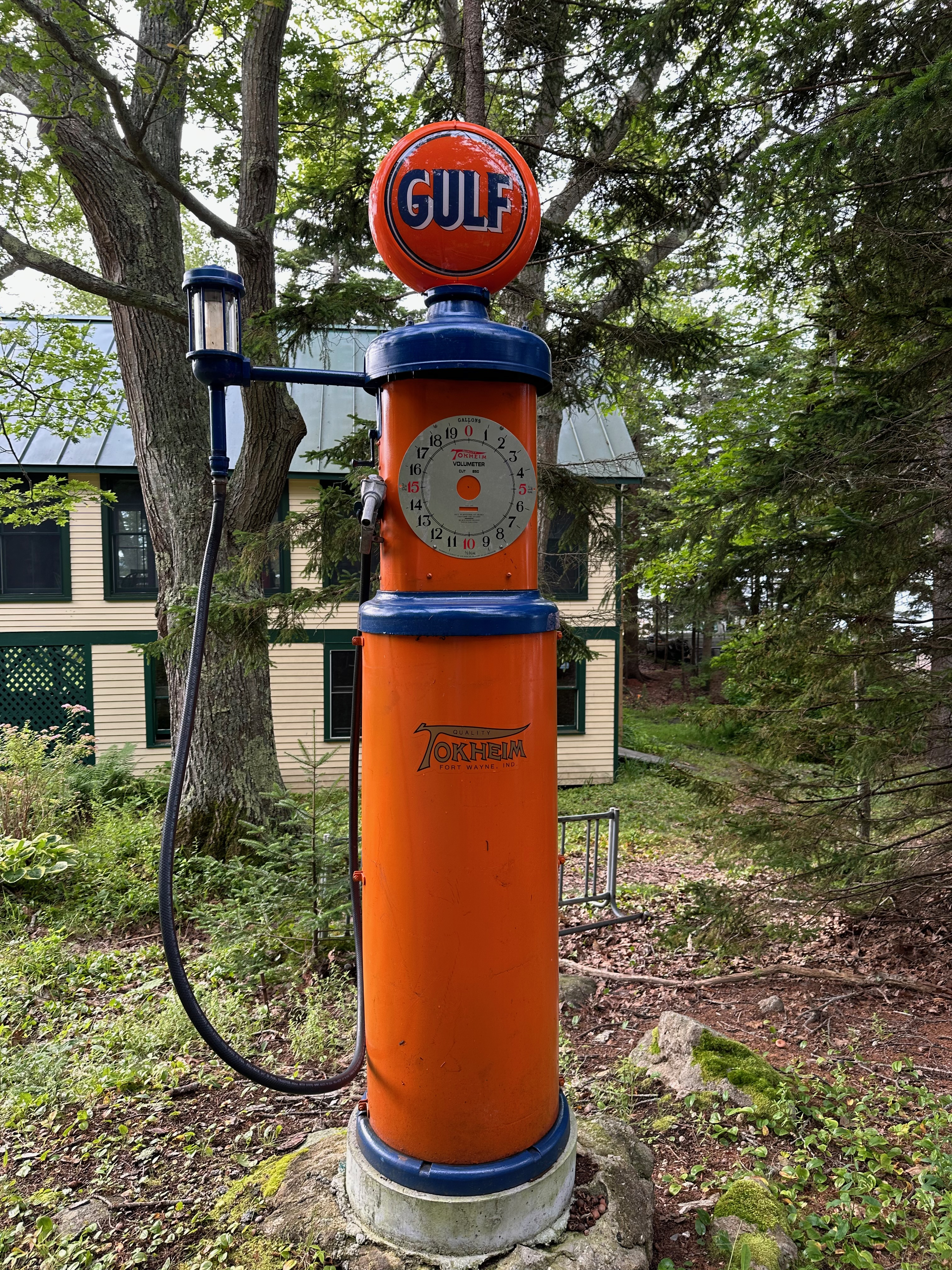
- A Tokheim dispenser of Gulf fuel
- Company type: Division
- Industry: Manufacturing
- Founded: 1901
- Headquarters: Austin, Texas
- Key people: Mike McCann (default acting president)
- Products: Fuel Supply Systems
- Number of employees: 2,800
- Parent: Dover Corporation
- Website: www.tokheim.com

Tokheim is an American manufacturer of fuel dispensers. It is one of the world's leading manufacturers and servicers of fuel dispensing equipment.

The group as part of Dover Fueling Solutions has operations in many countries and offers fuel dispensers and pumps, retail automation systems, payment terminals, media devices, replacement parts and upgrade kits, and support services including service station construction and maintenance.

== Products ==
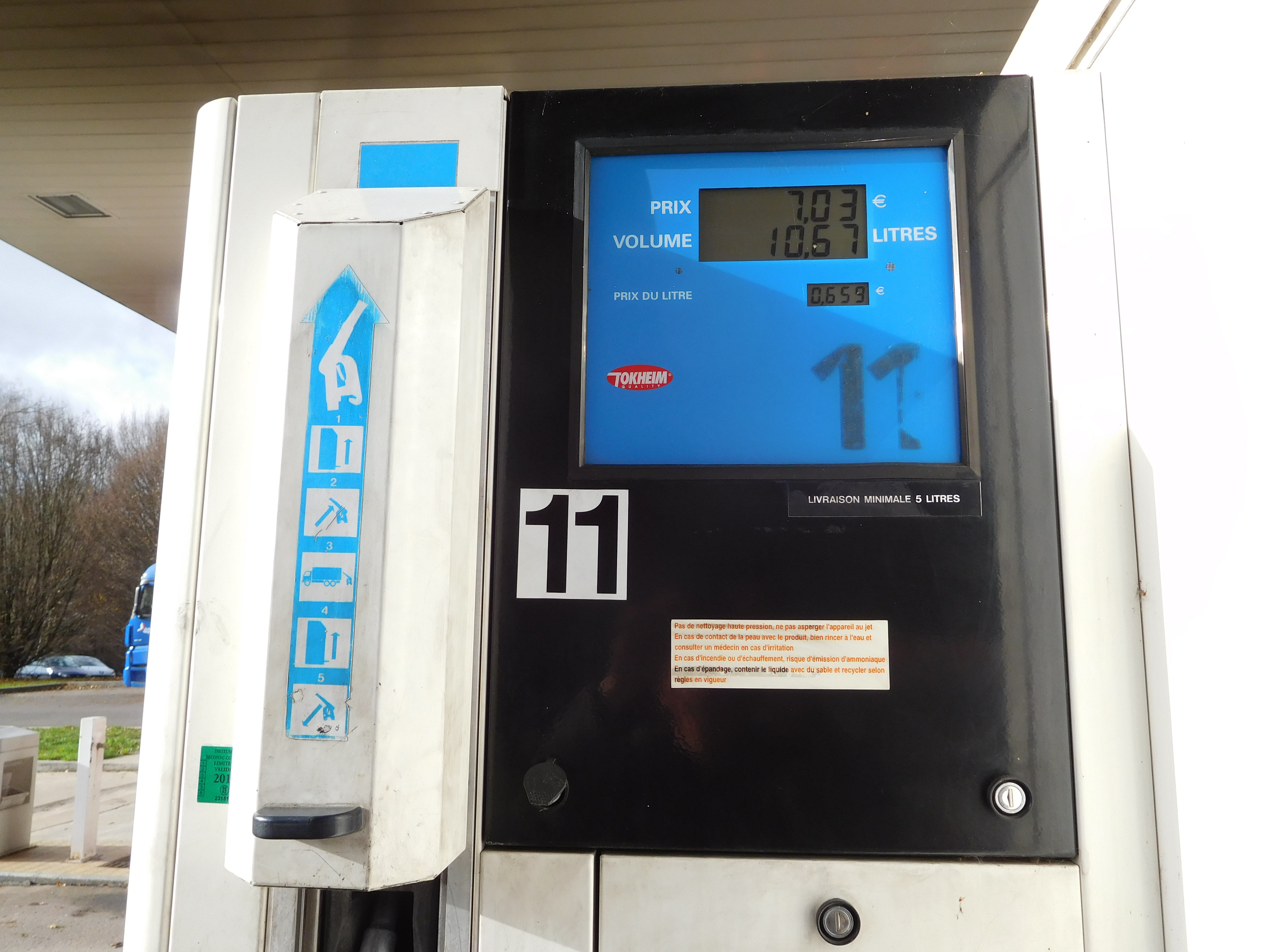
Tokheim AdBlue dispenser in France.

Tokheim designs and assembles fuel dispensing systems and electronic data and payment automation systems for the global fuel retail systems and services market. Tokheim services include installation, maintenance, construction, and refurbishment of fuel dispensers. The company's products and services are used in over 40,000 service station and sold to over 350 customers from major oil companies to independent distributors. Customers include Esso, Total, Shell, Intermarché, Carrefour and BP. Tokheim has over 5,400 employees through 33 wholly owned sales and services subsidiaries in Europe, Asia and Africa. For the fiscal year ended April 2012, the company had sales of €643 million.

== History ==
The company is named after the Norwegian John J. Tokheim. Working in a hardware store in Thor, Iowa, he was conscious of the dangers of storing fuel. In 1898, he designed an exterior storage system, served by a modified water pump. This development had the advantage of allowing him to accurately meter the delivery of fuel. In 1901, he patented the world's first vehicle fuel dispenser.

The popularity of his invention, the Tokheim Dome Oil Pump, led to the founding of the Tokheim Manufacturing Company in Cedar Rapids, Iowa, in 1901. In 1918, a group of executives from Fort Wayne, Indiana, purchased the company and moved the business there. It later grew to become Tokheim Corporation. In the 1970s, Tokheim unsuccessfully marketed a bicycle gearing system, an alternative to the derailleur. In 2003, Tokheim Corporation's North America operations were acquired by First Reserve, while its international assets and subsidiaries were acquired by Tokheim S.A.S., owned 94% by AXA Private Equity and 6% by a management team. In 2005, Tokheim S.A.S. was acquired by Cognetas (previously named Electra Partners Europe), together with the management of Tokheim.

In January 2016, Tokheim was acquired by OPW, and together form one of the largest fuel retail equipment providers in the world.
