= Nucleus, the Nuclear and Caithness Archives =

Archives in Highland, Scotland

- Scottish Gaelic: Niùclas: An Tasglann Niùclasach agus Gallach
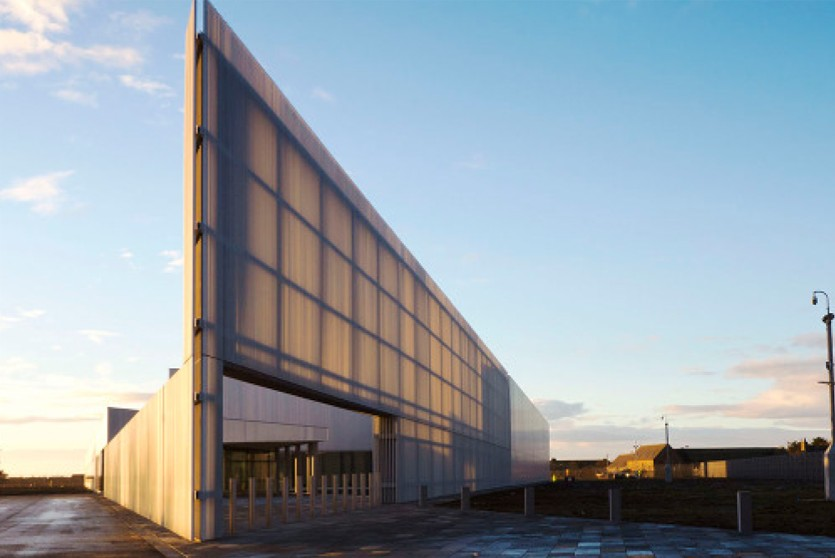

General information
- Location: Wick, Scotland
- Coordinates: 58.451°N 3.084°W
- Current tenants: UK Civil Nuclear Industry Records, County of Caithness Archives
- Opened: February 2017
- Cost: £21 million
- Client: Nuclear Decommissioning Authority

Design and construction
- Main contractor: Morrison Construction

Website
- www.highlifehighland.com/nucleus-nuclear-caithness-archives/

Nucleus, the Nuclear and Caithness Archives (Scottish Gaelic: Niùclas: An Tasglann Niùclasach agus Gallach) is the national archive of the British civil nuclear industry and the archive for the County of Caithness. The archives were constructed by the Nuclear Decommissioning Authority (NDA) and opened in 2017. Work continues at the facility to bring together all of the NDA's archive material from 16 separate sites. The Caithness county archives, dating from 1589 are also held at the site.

== Building ==
The archives are housed on former Royal Air Force land adjacent to Wick Airport in Caithness, North-East Scotland. The facility was constructed by the Nuclear Decommissioning Authority (NDA) at the cost of £21 million. The site was chosen from a shortlist of four areas selected by the NDA as being affected by the decommissioning of nuclear power stations. More than 2,000 people in the local area are working to decommission the former nuclear facilities at Dounreay in a project set to complete in 2030. The establishment of the archives will create 25 permanent jobs in the area, the majority of which can be filled by members of the local community.

The facility was constructed under a design and build contract by Morrison Construction. The design was carried out by Reiach and Hall Architects who won the Architects' Journal 2017 Editor's Choice Award for their work. It consists of a two-storey concrete archive building and a separate single-storey administration and publicly-accessible building. The buildings are clad in silver-anodised aluminium and the grounds contain "lochan" (small lochs) water features. The facility opened in February 2017.

== Archives ==
Nucleus holds the national archive of the UK civil nuclear industry and the county archive for Caithness. The site is managed by High Life Highland, an arm of the Highland Council. The archives are made available for public access. The site will also become a training centre for archivists, with links to the University of the Highlands and Islands and the North Highland College. The archives are in the process of being digitised by Restore Digital to allow online access.

=== Nuclear archive ===
The UK nuclear industry archive was previously spread around at least 16 separate sites, often in buildings associated with current or former nuclear power stations. The NDA began looking for a suitable site to accommodate the consolidated records in 2005. Since the opening of Nucleus records have begun to be transferred there from the other sites. This process began with the transfer of 330,000 photographs and 200 tonnes of documents from nearby Dounreay power station. The transfer of the whole archive will be complete by 2022 and will include 80,000 boxes of files from Sellafield and a similar number held by Magnox Ltd. The digital archive comprises 30 million records dating back to the late 1940s. The archive was supplemented by the transfer of a collection of 1950s era nuclear-related journals from the library of the North Highland College.

=== Caithness archive ===
The Caithness county archive had previously been housed at the Caithness Archive Centre in Wick Library but had outgrown the storage facilities there. It comprises charters, minutes, correspondence, maps and photographs with the earliest records dating from 1589.
