= 2020 Reading stabbings =

Stabbing attack in Reading, England

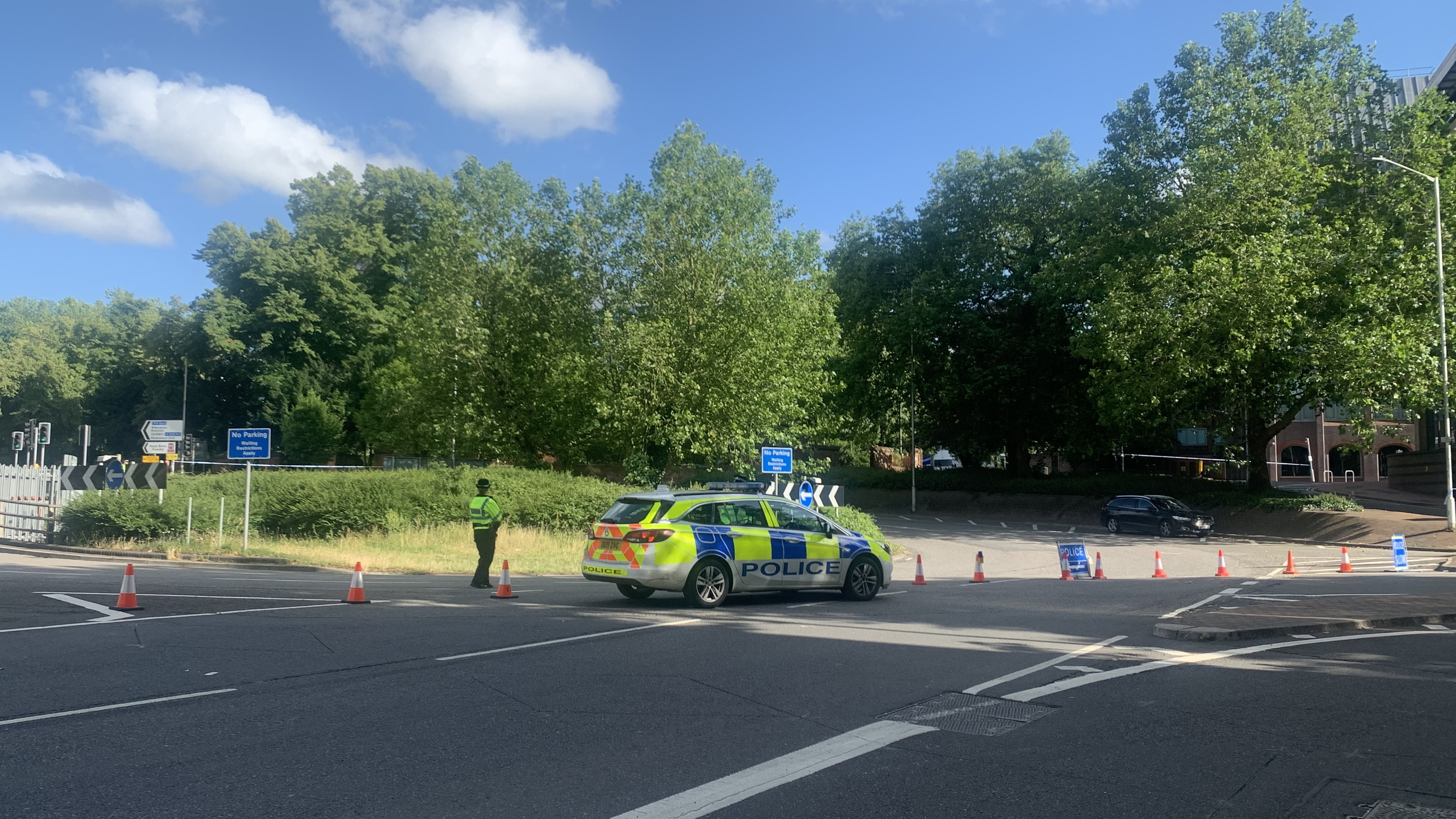
- Police presence near Forbury Gardens on 21 June

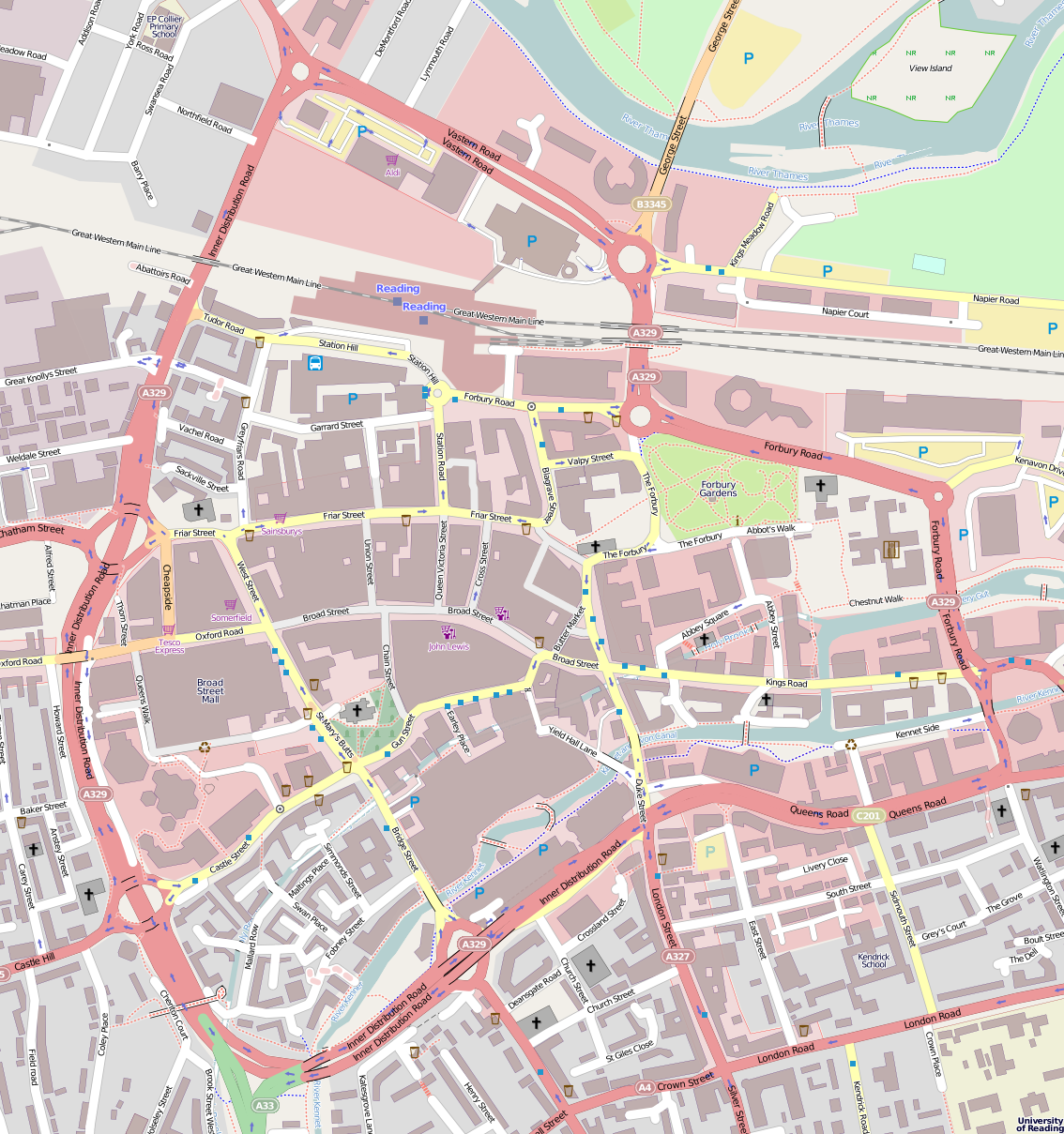
- Location: Forbury Gardens, Reading, Berkshire, UK
- Date: 20 June 2020 approx. 19:00 (BST (UTC+1))
- Target: Visitors at Forbury Gardens
- Attack type: Stabbing
- Weapon: Knife
- Deaths: 3
- Injuries: 3
- Perpetrator: Khairi Saadallah
- Motive: Jihadism (Islamic terrorism)

On the evening of 20 June 2020, a man with a knife attacked people who were socialising in Forbury Gardens, a park in the English town of Reading. Three men were killed and three other people were seriously injured.

Khairi Saadallah, a 25-year-old Libyan refugee, was arrested shortly afterwards. He pleaded guilty of three counts of murder and three counts of attempted murder, and in January 2021 was sentenced to a whole-life term. The inquest, which concluded in April 2024, found that the attacks were avoidable.

== Attack ==
The attack occurred during the Covid-19 pandemic, towards the end of the first lockdown, when most indoor venues for socialising were still not available; pubs, for example, did not reopen until 4 July 2020.

Shortly before 19:00 BST on 20 June 2020, Khairi Saadallah attacked two groups of people socialising in Forbury Gardens, a public park in the centre of Reading, about 40 miles (64 km) west of London. Using an 8-inch (20 cm) kitchen knife, Saadallah stabbed people in the eye, neck, head and back. A witness said the stabbing was "completely random". At 18:56, officers from Thames Valley Police went to the park, responding to reports of a stabbing with multiple casualties.

Saadallah was chased, tackled and pinned to the ground by police officers on Friar Street – near its junction with the Inner Distribution Road – approximately five minutes after the first 999 call was made. He was arrested on suspicion of murder, and re-arrested while in custody under Section 41 of the Terrorism Act 2000.

== Attacker ==
The perpetrator was 25-year-old Khairi Saadallah. He was born in Libya into an affluent middle-class family. In 2018, he was given permission to stay in the United Kingdom after claiming asylum in 2012. A family member said he had post-traumatic stress from the civil war and had come to the United Kingdom from Libya in 2012 to escape from violence there, living first in Manchester. In the war, it was claimed that he was part of Ansar al-Sharia, a group now proscribed in the UK, and stated falsely in his asylum application that he was not involved in combat. In 2018, he was given five years' permission to stay in the UK.

Saadallah was convicted six times for 15 crimes between 2015 and 2019, of which eight were violent crimes, two involved possession of a knife and two involved racially or religiously aggravated harassment. He was said to have smoked cannabis and had regular visits from a mental health professional. A security source told Reuters that the suspect had come to the attention of Britain's domestic security agency MI5 in 2019 over intelligence that he aspired to travel for extremist purposes, and he had been investigated over jihadist concerns. In 2017, prison staff noted that he was spending a lot of time with Abu Izzadeen of the proscribed group Al-Muhajiroun. He had been released from prison 17 days before the attack, having been sentenced for assault and possessing a bladed article: the UK was unable to deport him because it would have breached his human rights to send him back to Libya.

Saadallah yelled "Allahu akbar" during the attack, and a Muslim bystander heard him say "God accept my jihad" in Arabic. After his arrest, Saadallah told police that "[he] was going to paradise for the jihad what [he] did to the victims". Police later found images of the World Trade Center and Islamic State flag on his phone, alongside videos about Jihadi John, an ISIS terrorist. Saadallah also had a crucifix tattoo, had prayed in church and told police that he was both Muslim and Catholic; his defence lawyer argued that this indicated that he did not have a serious devotion to radical Islam.

The Guardian reported that sources said that Saadallah was initially believed by the intelligence agencies to have mental health problems. Sky News additionally reported that he lived in a flat in Reading. It was later confirmed that Saadallah faked a mental illness, and was acting in pursuit of his extremist ideology.

== Casualties ==
The attack resulted in three fatalities at the scene, as well as three seriously injured with knife wounds to their head, face, hand, and back. The Thames Valley Air Ambulance, Hampshire & Isle of Wight Air Ambulance and London's Air Ambulance were deployed to the scene, and South Central Ambulance Service deployed their Hazardous Area Response Team. Of the injured people, two were admitted to the Royal Berkshire Hospital's emergency department, in Reading. One other injured person was taken to the John Radcliffe Hospital in Oxford, but was discharged without being admitted. One of the injured was a friend of the three fatalities.

The three men who were killed were friends and members of the local LGBT+ community. Post-mortem examinations showed that they each died of a single stab wound; two were stabbed in the neck, and one in the back.

== Investigation and trial ==
=== Investigation ===
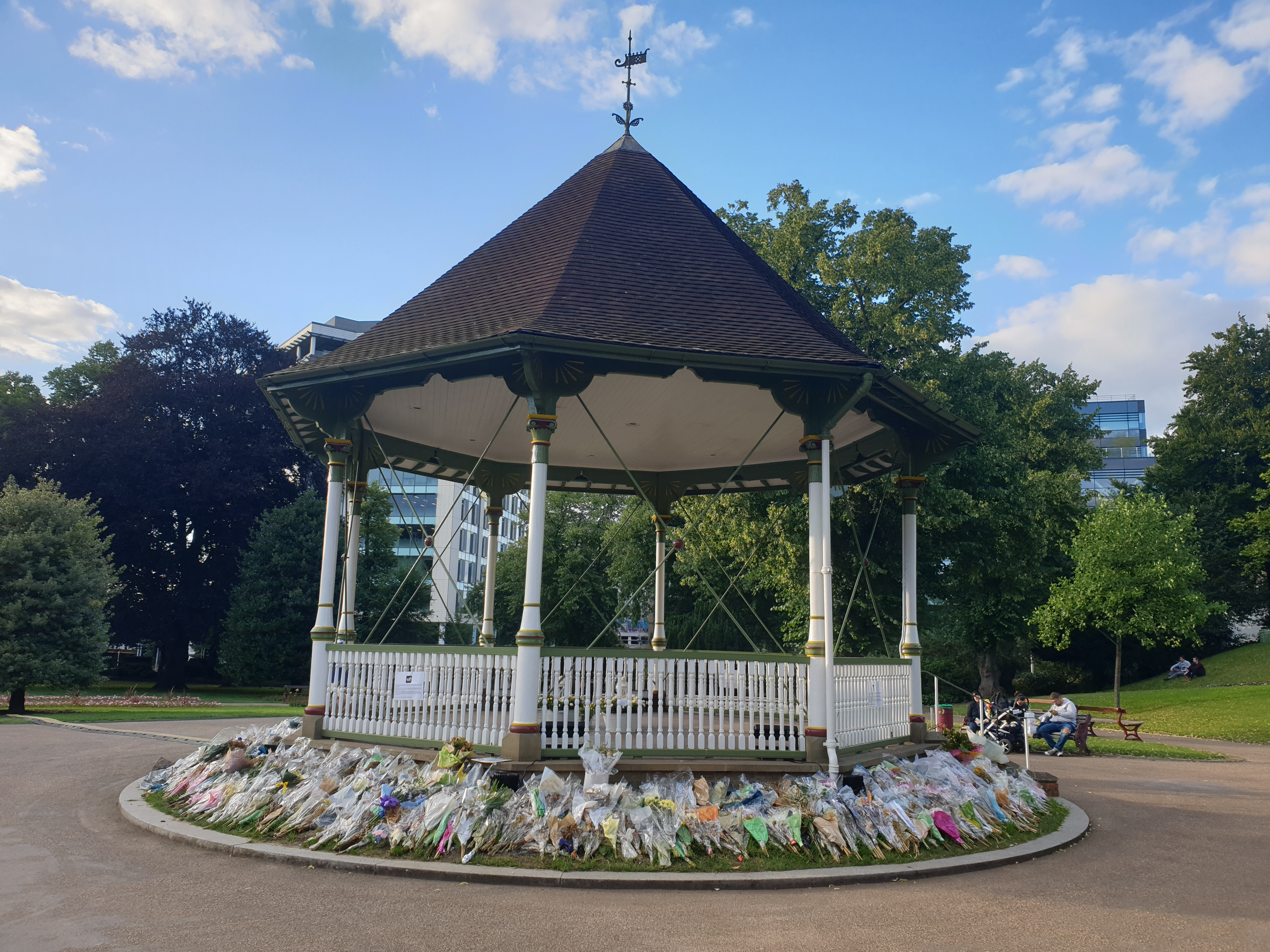
Forbury Gardens bandstand shortly after the gardens re-opened, with flowers previously laid by members of the public and moved here

Initial police statements from Thames Valley Police on the evening of the incident said that the incident was "not currently being treated as a terrorism incident" and that they were "keeping an open mind as to the motivation", although counter terrorism officers were deployed.

The next morning, Counter-Terrorism Policing South East stated that the attacks were "a terror incident". It took over command of the incident from the local police, with support from MI5. On 22 June, police were granted a warrant to further detain Saadallah until 27 June.

Immediately after the stabbings, Forbury Gardens and the surrounding roads were closed to facilitate the police investigation. The roads re-opened on 1 July, whilst the gardens finally reopened on 10 July.

=== Trial ===
On 27 June, Saadallah was charged with three counts of murder and three counts of attempted murder. On 29 June, he appeared by video link at Westminster Magistrates' Court charged with three counts of murder and three counts of attempted murder. The prosecutor said the accused was heard shouting words to the effect of "Allahu akbar". He was remanded in custody to appear at the Old Bailey. After appearing at the Old Bailey by video link from Belmarsh Prison, London, for preliminary hearings on 1 and 10 July, the judge set 30 November as a provisional date for a full trial.

On 11 November, Saadallah admitted three charges of murder and three of attempted murder. On 11 January 2021, he was given a whole-life term. The sentencing judge said that it was a terrorist attack and that the purpose was to advance an extremist Islamic cause. In October 2021 Saadallah was refused leave to appeal the sentence.

=== Inquest ===
The inquest, which concluded in April 2024, found that the murders were avoidable; Saadallah had extensive contact with mental health services and police, but intelligence sharing between authorities (including counter-terrorist police officers, other police forces, the probation service, and Berkshire Healthcare NHS Foundation Trust) led to "significantly troubling failings" in highlighting him as a high risk. Judge Coroner Adrian Fulford, chairing the inquest, concluded that if Saadallah's mental health had been correctly managed, there was a possibility that the attacks would not have happened.

== Reactions ==
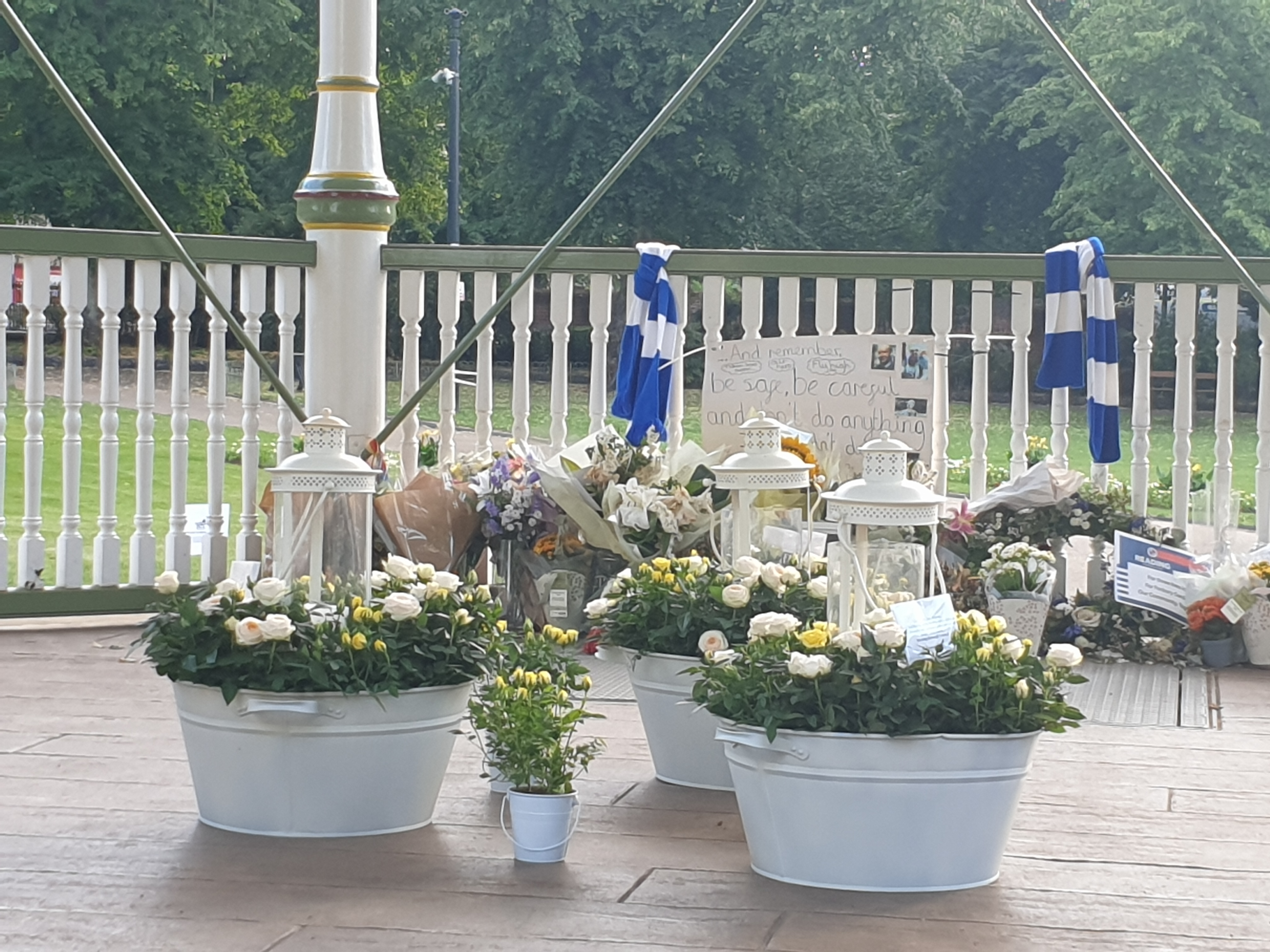
Flowers on the bandstand in memory of the three victims

Prime Minister Boris Johnson expressed his condolences and thanked emergency services for responding to the scene. On the morning after the stabbings, Johnson met with senior ministers, police, and security officials at 10 Downing Street to be briefed on the events. Home Secretary Priti Patel and Labour Party Leader Keir Starmer both expressed concern over the incident.

Jason Brock, the leader of Reading Borough Council, said he was "shocked and appalled" by the "horrific and senseless attack", expressed his condolences, and thanked the emergency services for their response. The council issued a statement saying that their "thoughts and prayers are with the families of the three people who lost their lives, and for those who remain seriously injured", and announcing that their flag would fly at half mast for the day.

After Saadallah's conviction, the father of James Furlong, one of the victims, said that "there are now serious questions that need answering", in reference to how Saadallah avoided deportation despite his previous violent offences.

== Memorial ==
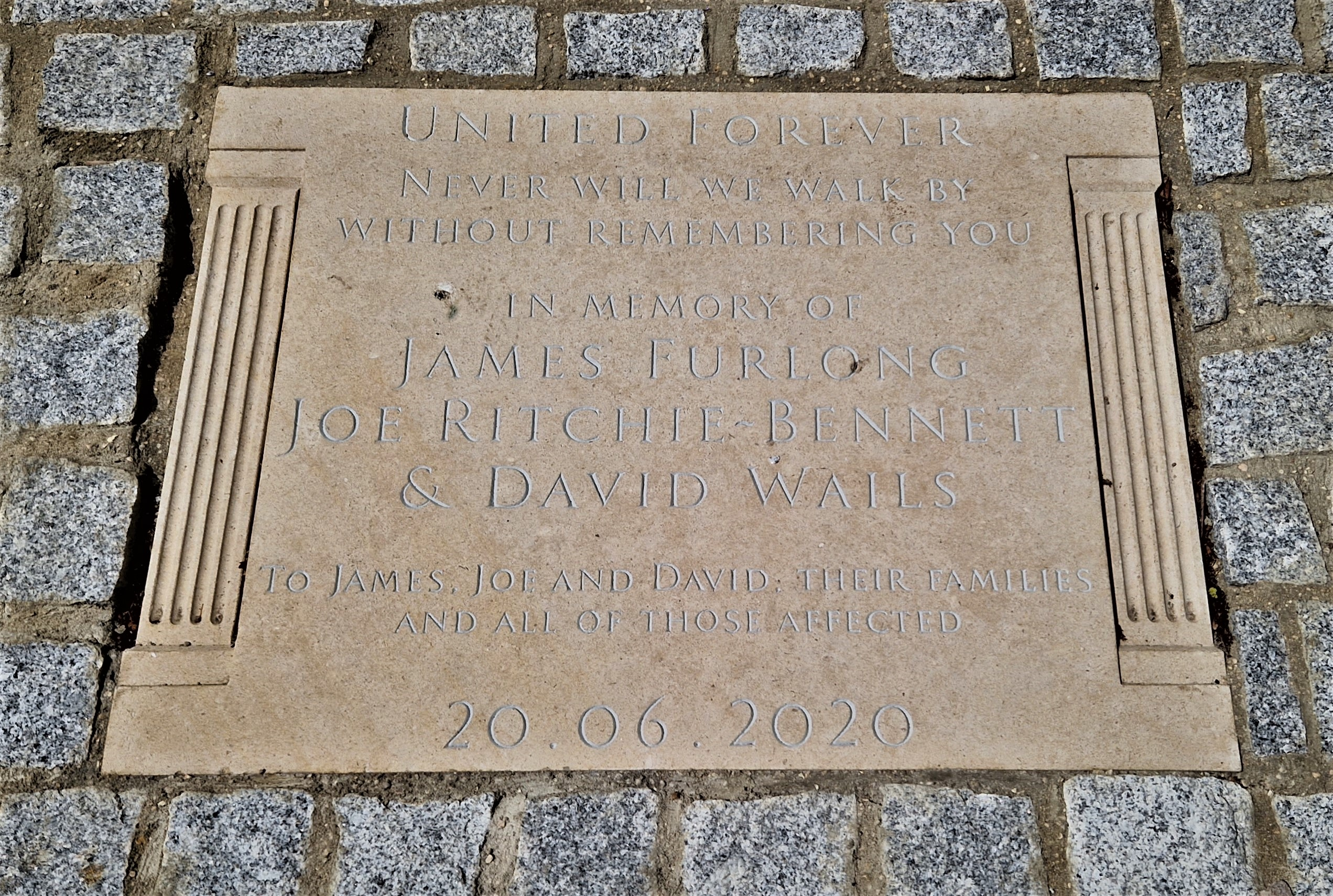
The memorial to the victims unveiled in 2023

Following the reopening of the gardens on 10 July, flowers originally laid by the public in the town were moved to surround the gardens' bandstand. A stone memorial, forming part of the podium of the bandstand, was unveiled on 20 June 2023 during a service marking the third anniversary of the attack.

== See also ==
- 2017 London Bridge attack
- 2017 Westminster attack
- 2019 London Bridge stabbing
- 2020 Streatham stabbing
- Glasgow hotel stabbings
- List of prisoners with whole-life orders
