= Unbound Group =

British clothing and footwear company

- Formerly: Electra Private Equity; Electra Investment Trust
- Company type: Public Company
- Traded as: LSE: UBG
- Industry: Clothing, footwear, online shopping
- Founded: 1976
- Headquarters: London, England
- Key people: Neil Johnson, (Chairman); Ian Watson (CEO)
- Products: Investments, private equity funds
- Website: www.unboundgroupplc.com

Unbound Group, formerly Electra Private Equity, is a British-based online company specialising in clothing and specialist footwear. It was listed on the Alternative Investment Market until going into administration in July 2023.

== History ==
The company was founded by Michael Stoddart in 1976 as Electra Investment Trust. In 1999, 3i made an unsuccessful hostile bid to take over the company. In 2005, Electra Partners Europe completed a spinout from its investment trust parent. In 2006, Electra Partners Europe renamed itself Cognetas.

In August 2021, the company announced that, following the spin-off of its hospitality business Hostmore plc (the parent company of TGI Fridays in the United Kingdom), it would rename itself Unbound Group and transfer to the Alternative Investment Market. This took effect on 1 February 2022. The company subsequently converted to being a retailer of clothing and specialist footwear. The company went into administration in July 2023.

== Activities ==
Since February 2002, the company has focused on the sale of clothing and specialist footwear.
