= Galliford Try =

British construction company

Galliford Try plc
- Type: Public limited company
- Traded as: LSE: GFRD
- Industry: Construction
- Founded: 1908
- Headquarters: Uxbridge, England
- Key people: Peter Ventress (non-executive chairman); Bill Hocking (CEO)
- Revenue: ▲£1,931.1 million (2026)
- Operating income: ▲£48.6 million (2026)
- Net income: ▲£41.2 million (2026)
- Number of employees: 4,300 (2026)
- Website: www.gallifordtry.co.uk

Galliford Try plc is a British construction company based in Uxbridge, England. It was created through a merger in 2000 of two businesses: Try Group, founded in 1908 in London, and Galliford, founded in 1916. It is listed on the London Stock Exchange and is a constituent of the FTSE 250 Index.

Formerly involved in housebuilding, it sold its housing businesses to Bovis Homes, subsequently renamed Vistry Group, in January 2020, and Galliford Try is today focused on the building, highways and environment markets. Prior to the sale of its housing arm, it was ranked fifth largest by turnover among UK construction companies in 2019.

== History ==
=== Background ===
The company was created in 2000 through the merger of Try Group plc, founded in 1908 in London, and Galliford plc, founded in 1916.

Try was founded by the carpenter William S. Try during 1908 in Uxbridge, west London. W. S. Try Ltd operated as a general contractor until the beginning of the 1970s, when Try Homes was formed. Despite completing several acquisitions, the company's housing activities remained on a relatively small scale, peaking at around 200 units per year during the early 1990s.

Thomas Galliford established a steamroller hire business in Wolvey, Warwickshire in 1916, but this venture closed during the Second World War after which his sons re-formed the company, incorporated as a civil engineering business, Galliford & Sons, on 2 April 1952. Galliford became a public company in 1965. It entered the private housing market in 1973 with the acquisition of Crabb Curtis. In 1997 the firm's aggregate trading business Galliford Roadstone was divested, creating the GRS Group. The housing contribution was subsequently extended through Stamford Homes and, in 1998, the acquisition of Midas Homes, by which time the group was building around 500 houses a year.

=== 2000s ===
The merger incurred some one-time costs were largely attributable for the company's first year profit being down 50%, to £4.9m, in spite of an increase in turnover of 25% to £568.5m; In the early 2000s, management opted to respond with a series of redundancies and targets closures of underperforming offices. Early on, Galliford Try opted to maintain its two existing construction brands rather than amalgamate them into one identity. The company's early operations were dogged by speculations that it would be acquired by, or amalgamated with, a larger construction company; a £116 million bid was made during 2003 by Rok plc, but was rejected by Galliford Try.

The creation of Galliford Try came amid calls from investors for consolidation within the British construction sector. In response, the company embarked on its first acquisitions less than a year after its formation. Specific acquisitions made during the 2000s were largely focused on the expansion of its housebuilding business, such as of Gerald Wood Homes in 2001, Chartdale in 2006, Kendall Cross in 2007, Linden Homes in 2008, and Rosemullion Homes in 2009. Furthermore, the company expanded its construction business via the acquisition of Morrison Construction from AWG plc in 2006. (The remaining Morrison Utilities Services business within AWG plc later formed M Group Services).

Throughout the 2000s, the housing market was a key sector of activity. During 2004, Galliford Try announced it had set a target to double the number of house sales being made within three years. One year later, further objectives were set, which included the doubling of construction-related turnover and the number of houses being built by 2010. During 2007, it rebranded its housebuilding division as Galliford Try Homes along with four regional brands. The company secured worked under the British government's private finance initiative (PFI) model, typically involving the construction of schools and other public works.

In the late 2000s, Galliford Try was negatively impacted by the Great Recession.

=== 2010s ===
In 2011, all of Galliford Try's individual house building divisions were rebranded as Linden Homes. During July 2014, Galliford Try acquired Miller Construction from Miller Homes in exchange for £16.6 million. One year later, it purchased Shepherd Homes.

During 2012, Galliford Try was appointed by Estura on a construction project at the Salcombe Harbour Hotel in Devon, in which the customer failed to submit a payment notice on time in accordance with the Housing Grants, Construction and Regeneration Act 1996, leading to the court case of Galliford Try Building Ltd v Estura Ltd., one of the leading cases on construction payment law in the UK.

During 2015, Greg Fitzgerald, the company's chief executive since 2005, stepped down from his position.

In February 2018, following the collapse the previous month of Carillion (Galliford Try's joint venture partner, with Balfour Beatty, on the Aberdeen Western Peripheral Route, AWPR), Galliford Try stated that it would need to raise £150 million to pay for cost overruns on the project; in November 2018, the company said delays would cost an extra £20 million, taking its total project hit to £143 million. CEO Peter Truscott said the company's construction division would no longer undertake fixed price major projects of this kind. On 27 March 2018, the company confirmed it had successfully raised £158m in a rights issue. Truscott left Galliford Try in March 2019 with Graham Prothero appointed as new CEO.

During April 2019, the company announced that it would downsize its construction operation as part of a strategic review undertaken in light of additional costs from the AWPR project, and from Morrison Construction's role on the £1.35 billion Queensferry Crossing project. The announcement caused Galliford Try's share price to drop 19%. The company subsequently announced 350 jobs were likely to be cut – mostly in Galliford Try's Scottish infrastructure operations – as the company focused on core strengths in buildings, water and highways. Restructuring the construction business cost the group £10m.

In July 2019, Galliford Try was suspended from the Prompt Payment Code for failing to pay suppliers on time. Following improvements in its payment performance, it was restored to the Prompt Payment Code in January 2020.

On 11 September 2019, the group reported revenues for the year to June 2019 of £2.863 billion (down 8% from 2018); pre-tax profit was down 27% at £104.7 million. Galliford Try reported a £61.5 million operating loss on its construction activities, with revenues down 18%, affected also by the losses incurred on the AWPR project.

==== 2019-2020: Sale of house-building arm ====
On 24 May 2019, Galliford Try's board rejected a £950 million offer from Bovis Homes (led by former CEO Fitzgerald) to purchase its Linden Homes and Partnerships and Regeneration businesses. Two months later, the group was reportedly considering a possible demerger of its construction interests from the more profitable housing and partnerships business within the following two years.

During September 2019, discussions with Bovis Homes about a possible sale were reopened; that same month, a preliminary deal, valued at £1.075bn, was reportedly agreed. Sale of the housing business would permit the recapitalisation of Galliford Try's construction business, which, following restructuring, would employ some 3,400 staff and generate revenues of around £1.4 billion. On 7 November, it was reported that Bovis Homes had agreed a share and cash deal that valued Galliford Try's housing business at £1.1 billion. The sale of Galliford Try's housing interests to Bovis Homes, later renamed Vistry Group, was completed on 3 January 2020. Galliford Try received shares plus £300 million in the deal, making it a well-capitalised standalone contractor. As expected, Bill Hocking, formerly head of Galliford Try's construction arm, was appointed CEO of Galliford Try Holdings. The sale of the housing arm left the remaining business able to focus on the general construction, highways and environment markets.

=== 2020s: Stand-alone contractor ===
During the COVID-19 pandemic in 2020, Galliford Try furloughed staff and suspended a previously announced dividend. It said it could not quantify the pandemic's impacts on its operations and supply chain, and on its financial performance. In a July 2020 trading update, Galliford Try recorded an operating loss of 5% due to the pandemic. In a March 2021 trading update, Hocking forecast Galliford Try would report a full-year profit of around £10 million on revenues between £1.1 billion and £1.3 billion.

In October 2021, Galliford Try acquired NMCN's water business for £1 million from NMCN's administrators. In December 2021, the company moved its headquarters from Wolvey to the Gateway House development at Grove Park in Leicester.

During May 2024, the company announced that, as a part of its new growth strategy, it was returning to the affordable housing market.

In March 2025, Galliford Try disputed a claim by housebuilder Taylor Wimpey over alleged fire safety issues at a development (Rope Quays in Gosport) built by Morrison Construction, acquired by Galliford Try in March 2006 and now called Galliford Try Infrastructure.

In November 2025, Galliford Try took back control of a health facility in Worthing to resolve water system issues preventing the building opening a year after completion of construction. Due to the problems, the project cost increased from £35m to £45m.

== Major contracts ==
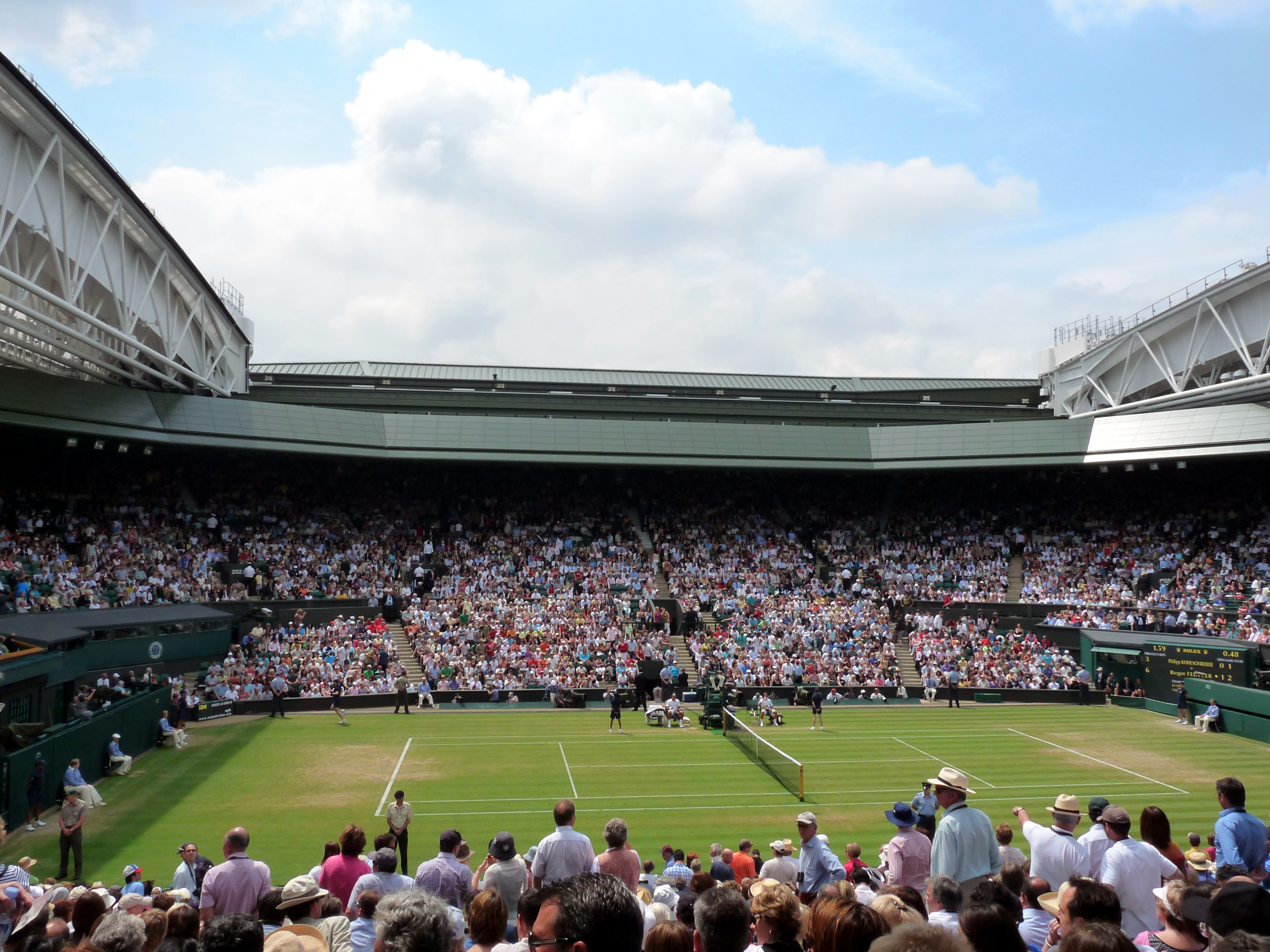
The Wimbledon Centre Court roof built by Galliford Try

Major projects include:

- the Centre Court roof at Wimbledon, completed in 2009
- the Corby Cube, completed in 2010
- the Warwickshire Justice Centre in Leamington Spa, completed in 2010
- the restoration of the St Pancras Renaissance London Hotel, completed in 2011
- the Museum of Liverpool, completed in 2011
- The Hive, Worcester, completed in 2012
- Halley VI Research Station, completed in 2013
- Hotel Football overlooking the football ground Old Trafford, completed in 2014
- Birmingham Dental Hospital, completed in 2016
- Aberdeen Western Peripheral Route, completed in 2019
- 2 Bristol Avenue, administrative headquarters of Barnet Council, completed in 2019

== Subsidiaries ==
Galliford Try plc owns a number of subsidiaries, including:

Subsidiary name	Area of business
Galliford Try	Main contractor construction
Morrison Construction	Scottish brand of Galliford Try main contractor construction
Ham Baker Engineering	Asset inspection and maintenance
Oak Specialist Services	Building fabric facades, cladding, fire protection, fire maintenance, risk assessments
Asset Intelligence	Physical, electronic and fire security systems
Lintott	Design, manufacture and aftercare of factory built treatment systems, software and electrical control panels
AVRS Systems	Mechanical and Electrical engineering
