= Volvo XC70 =

Volvo XC70 may refer to:

- Volvo XC70 (2025)
- Volvo V70/XC70, 2003 to 2016
