= Tactical emergency medical services =

Out-of-hospital care given in hostile situations

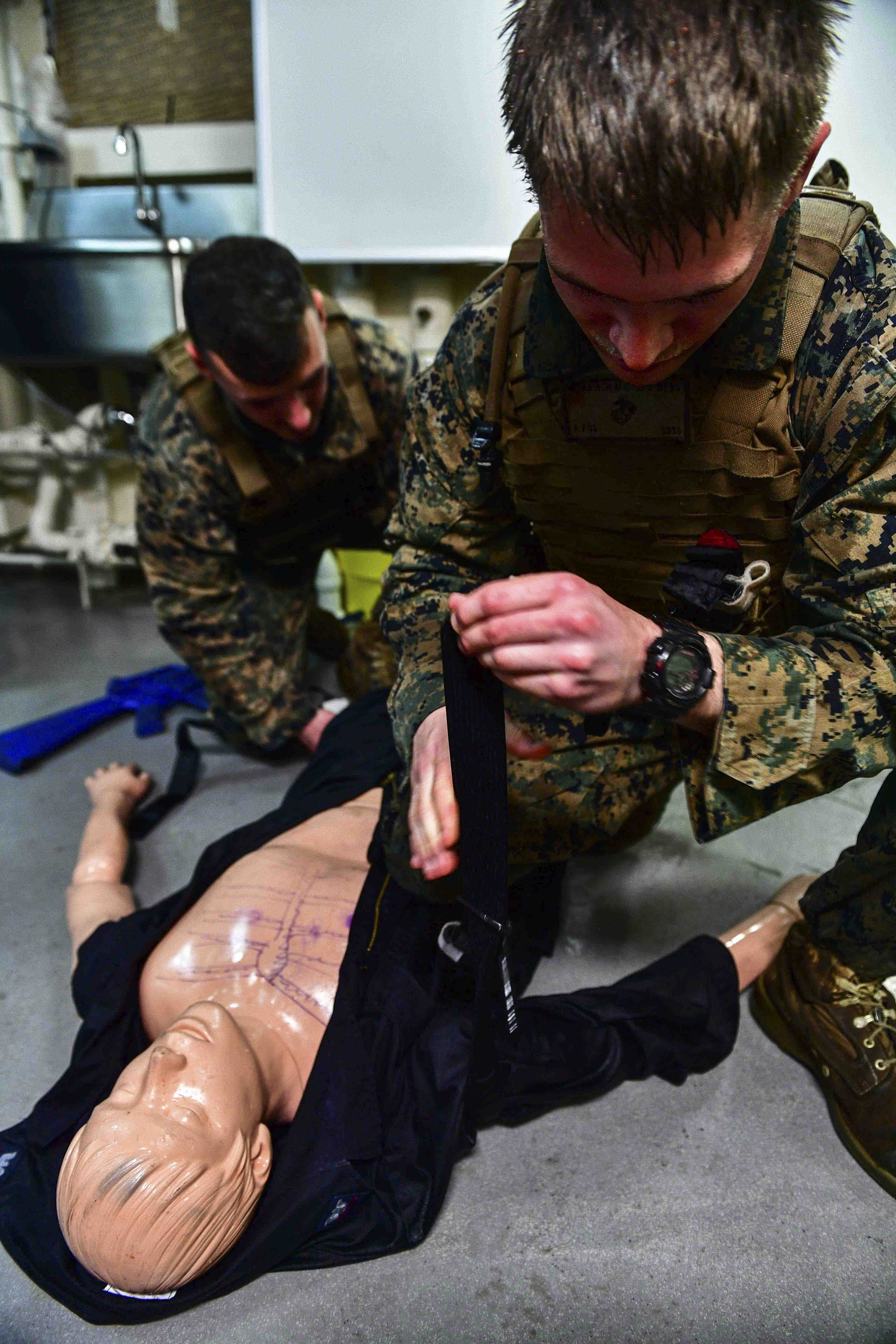
A Marine practices applying a tourniquet to a mannequin during a tactical combat casualty care course

Tactical emergency medical services (TEMS) is out-of-hospital care given in hostile situations by specially trained practitioners. Tactical support provided through TEMS can be applied in either the civilian world, generally with special law enforcement teams such as SWAT and SERT, as well as with military special operations teams. Tactical EMS providers are paramedics, nurses, and physicians who are trained to provide life-saving care and, sometimes, transport in situations such as tactical police operations, active shooters, bombings, and natural disasters. Tactical medical providers (TMPs) provide care in high risk situations where there is an increased likelihood for law enforcement, civilian, or suspect casualties. TEMS units are also deployed in situations where traditional EMS or firefighters cannot respond. TMPs are specially trained and authorized to perform live-saving medical procedures in austere and often times unconventional environments. TMPs are also expected to be competent in weapons safety and marksmanship, small unit tactics, waterborne operations, urban search and rescue, and HAZMAT. TMPs also serve to train their respective teams in complex medical procedures that may be performed in their absence. TEMS providers are sometimes sworn police officers cross trained as paramedics, paramedics that are operators trained and integrated into the SWAT Team, or medical providers trained in tactical EMS who are then integrated into law enforcement or military units.

== History ==
Tactical medicine has been in existence long before it was officially termed 'tactical EMS.' Tactical medicine has its origins on the battlefield. Since human beings have been fighting in wars, tactical medicine has been applied to those wounded in combat. Early kings had personal medics to care for them in the event that they were injured in battle, while the Spartans utilized persons from lower ranking classes, Helots, to tend to their injuries so they could continue fighting. During World War II as well as the Vietnam War, the need for a higher standard of battlefield medicine became increasingly apparent as up to 20% of soldiers wounded in combat would die from their wounds. It was found that the majority of deaths occurred from exsanguination (bleeding to death) or compromised breathing, usually related to a collapsed lung or airway obstruction. Exsanguination in combat was mitigated by the widespread training of military personnel on tourniquet use. Deaths due to airway compromise and other breathing issues were decreased once medics were trained in Basic life support procedures such as inserting airways and using Bag valve masks. Not surprisingly, many of the same injuries such as penetrating trauma, blast injuries, and airway compromise are sustained by law enforcement in their line of duty. Following the widely publicized active shooter situations such as the Columbine High School massacre, Virginia Tech shooting, and others, major changes took place in law enforcement protocol regarding emergency medical support in the field. One of these changes involved training officers in proper care of their own wounds and the wounds of their partners/teammates through interventions such as properly applying a Tourniquet. Many agencies have also put their officers through Emergency medical technician training to obtain additional medical knowledge. An additional option, which most closely resembles tactical EMS, is utilizing a person previously trained as a medical practitioner to provide medical support for law enforcement by either integrating them into the team itself or allowing them to treat casualties in a warm zone (a location that is deemed to be a mild risk for sustaining injuries). Presently, many law enforcement agencies across the nation have recognized the benefit of training a medical professional as a tactical officer and utilizing them in situations where there is a higher risk of sustaining casualties.

== Common Equipment used in the Field ==
There is a host of equipment TEPs have at their disposal on top of their issued ballistic vests and helmets. Depending on the issue at hand, they have to be equipped to handle the widest range of medical emergencies while keeping weight at a minimum. (cite LER book page 24)

For bleeding control, TEMS has a range of tools at hand depending on the severity:

- Tourniquets
- Trauma Bandages
- Hemostatic Agent
- Chest Seals

For Airway control, TEMS starts with reposition the patient, when that isn't enough or isn't an option, they turn to the following:

- Nasopharyngeal Airway
- Oropharyngeal Airway
- Pocket Masks
- Bag-Valve Masks
- Supraglottic Airway Devices

Skeletal emergencies require TEMS to stabilize the area until transport can be safely made. Tools to aid this are:

- Neck Braces
- Arm Slings
- SAM Splints
- Traction Splints
- Backboards

== Injuries treated in the field ==
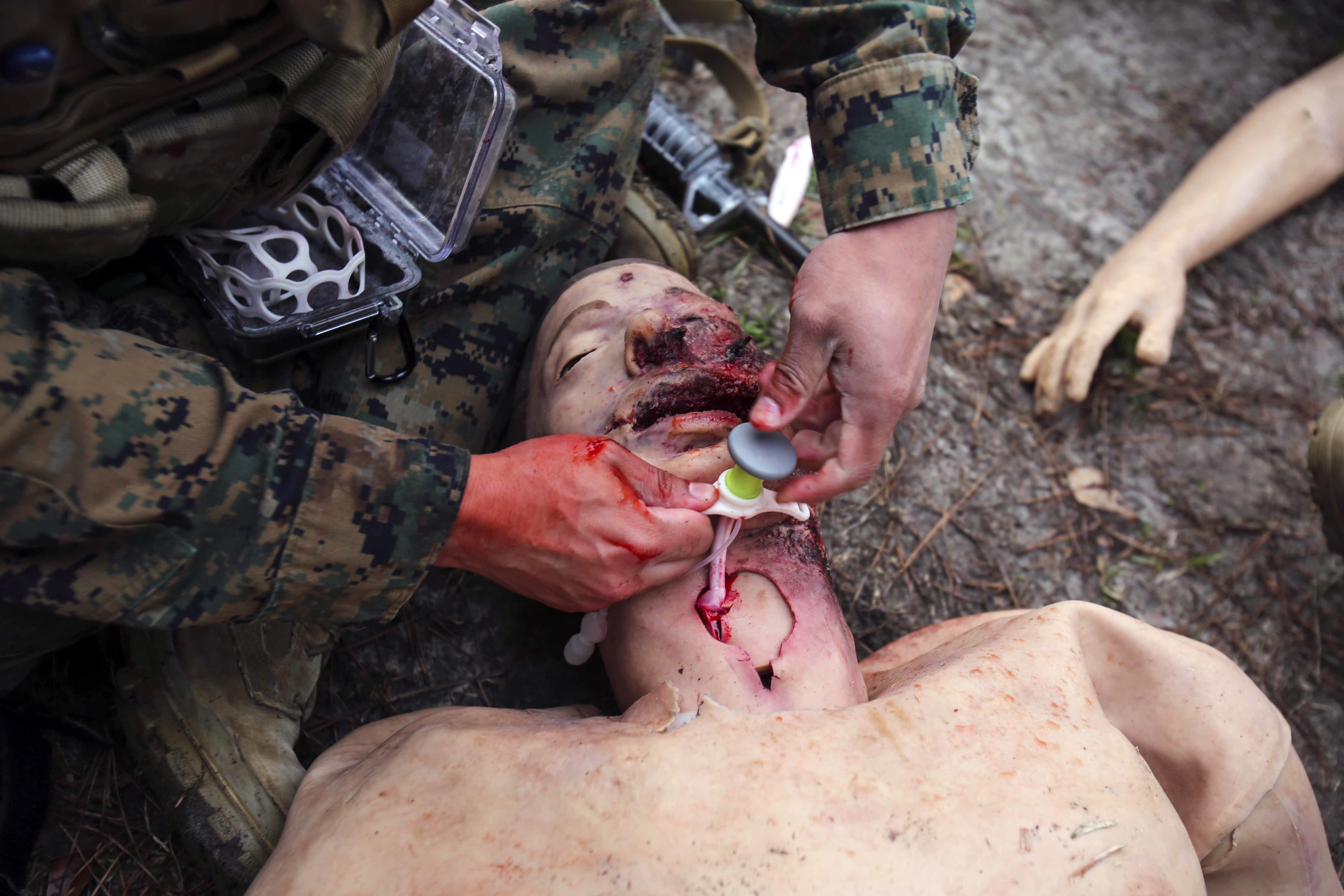
A hospital corpsman inserts a Control Cric tube into a mannequin during a Tactical Combat Casualty Care (TCCC) training exercise after successfully establishing a cricothyroidotomy

- Gunshot wounds
- Stabbings
- Tension pneumothorax
- Hemothorax
- Fractures
- Burns
- Obstructed airway
- Chemical poisoning
- Blast injuries

== Roles and duties of Tactical EMS providers ==
During active missions, Tactical EMS Providers serve to provide immediate casualty care to injured/sick team members; team members are prioritized over civilian or suspect casualties. TMPs aid in the extraction and evacuation of casualties from the scene, often times staying with them until they reach the hospital. They communicate with leaders in charge of the mission and provide preventative medical suggestions.

After the mission is complete, TMPs will participate in the debrief to discuss what went wrong during the mission from a medical perspective, how it could have been better, and provide a solution to prevent it from happening again in the future. This is generally followed up by a training session to employ the suggested changes. Additionally, following a mission, TMPs will provide medical support not only from a physical perspective, but from a mental health perspective for their teammates.

When not participating in training work-ups and live missions, the TMP serves to educate and train the team on life-saving medical procedures such as chest tube placement, cricothyrotomy, needle decompression, and rapid sequence intubation. Additionally, the TMP is expected to train with their team in weapons safety and marksmanship, workouts, and tactics exercises. TMPs will also give their recommendations on various medical protocols within the department that they are serving in, and advocate for any changes they believe will better the team as a whole.

== Tactical EMS providers ==
=== Physicians ===
It is traditional for an emergency physician to serve as the TMP for a law enforcement/military unit, though there have historically been other specialties which have filled the role such as family medicine practitioners and surgeons. However, additional training is generally required for specialties other than emergency medicine. The tactical medicine fellowship at Johns Hopkins specifically trains emergency physicians in providing medical direction for special operations medical programs throughout the country as well as giving physicians 2 years of experience working in the field with various law enforcement agencies. Though all physicians trained through the Johns Hopkins fellowship generally go on to become TMPs, this does not mean that all physician TMPs must undergo this fellowship. Unlike paramedics, physicians are not as commonly integrated into units like SWAT teams, but this varies between each agency and is ultimately the decision of team leadership. The Special Operations Surgical Team, for example, is a 6 person team made of an emergency physician, a surgeon, and support staff which serves as a direct attachment to special operations units such as SEAL teams and Special Forces units. The traditional role of the physician in these specialized units, and what separates them from other medical providers in TEMS, is providing medical direction to medics or nurses who may be integrated into the team itself, or to other team leadership. If the physician is the sole TMP for the team, then it is their duty to provide life-saving emergency medical care to wounded law enforcement/military, civilians, or perpetrators. Medical care ideally takes place within 30 seconds of the injury onset. When not providing support during an active threat or training scenario, the physician serves to educate and train law enforcement on up-to-date life-saving medical procedures that can be performed in the field.

=== Paramedics/nurses/physician assistants ===
Medical providers who are not physicians (Paramedics, Nurses, and Physician assistants) may also serve as TMPs for tactical units. Contrasting physician TMPs, it is more likely for a lower level medical provider to be integrated into the team itself. It is preferred that if there is a physician available, that they are better used to provide medical direction for the team from the warm zone rather than going into the hot zone with the team. In the field, lower level providers can perform nearly any procedure that an emergency physician is able to perform. These procedures include: tourniquet application, chest tube insertion, rapid sequence intubation, and needle decompressions. There are various agencies across the country that are approved to train lower level medical providers to be TMPs. A certification, the NAEMT TCCC (National Association of Emergency Medical Technicians Tactical Combat Casualty Care) certification is earned at the end of these training courses. The training generally consists of a 16 hour course where trainees complete online training modules as well as real-world combat casualty care scenarios.

== Tactical EMS globally ==
Because injuries happen in conflict areas all over the world, the needs of care are similar as well. Authorized Firearms Officers in the United Kingdom (Similar to the United States SWAT team) are trained to provide care for the following:

- Basic Life Saving measures (BLS)
- Ballistic Injuries
- Management of bleeding, chest pain, and skeletal injuries
- Chest Seals Application
- Simple Splints Application
- Proper tourniquet usage

== Advantages of Tactical EMS ==
Tactical EMS serves the main advantage of providing life-saving medical care extremely rapidly. Law enforcement and military special operations teams who deploy without tactical EMS run the risk of sustaining team or civilian casualties that are more likely to result in fatalities in the field due to untimely response. Without a TMP, units must wait for traditional fire or EMS to respond to the scene, and then wait for even longer while the scene is made safe. A TMP has the advantage of being seconds away when casualties occur, and does not have to wait for the scene to be cleared before they can begin providing medical treatment. The TMP also benefits the team from a psychological perspective, since the team knows that they have a highly trained medical provider who can care for them within seconds if they become injured while going in harm's way.

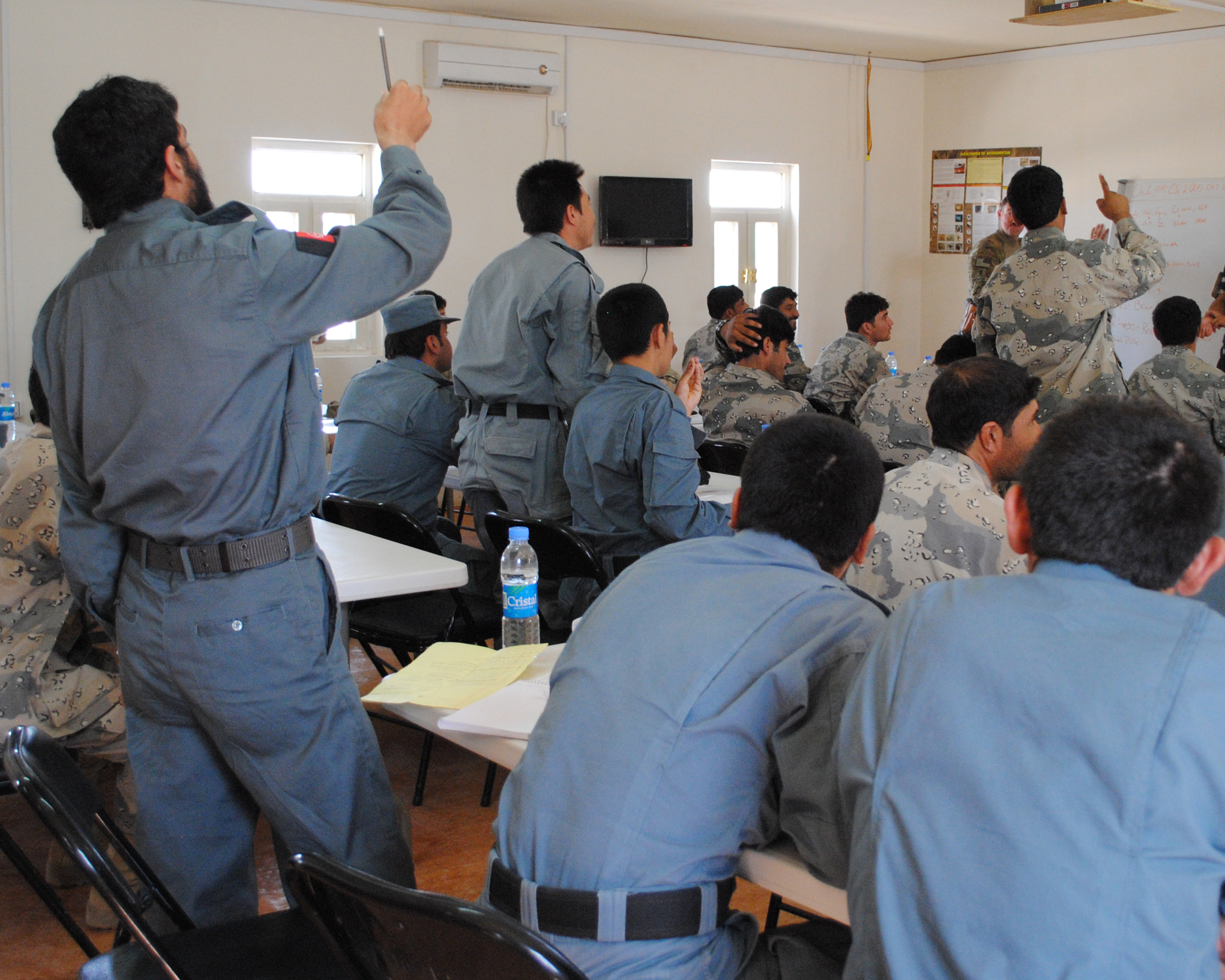
Afghan police officers undergoing a combat medic course

== Future of Tactical EMS ==
Tactical EMS utilization has grown in law enforcement agencies as well as military over the last 20 years. Before the early 2000's, there were no teams in the military dedicated to tactical medicine. However, in 2003, the Special Operations Surgical Team was formed in the Air Force, with the purpose of providing far-forward medical support to special operations teams deploying into combat. Many law enforcement agencies, even those that exist in relatively smaller cities, have tactically-trained medics to support their SWAT teams. The SWAT team in Kalamazoo, MI, for example, utilizes a tactical paramedic as an adjunct to their SWAT team. The number of departments who utilize TMPs within their law enforcement agencies is expected to continue to grow. In recent years, many other countries have adopted a similar tactical EMS model as the United States.
