= Greg Fitzgerald =

British business executive (born 1964)

Greg Fitzgerald (born 21 June 1964) is a British business executive. He has been chief executive officer of Vistry Group (formerly Bovis Homes) since April 2017. Fitzgerald held the same position at Galliford Try from 2005 to 2015.

== Early life and career ==
Fitzgerald was born in Barry, Vale of Glamorgan, South Wales to Welsh parents. His father was a warrant officer in the Royal Navy and the family followed him on postings to Singapore, Portsmouth, Plymouth and Dartmouth. From the age of four he lived in Devon and attended school in Torquay. He left school at 16 with three O levels and went to work as a dish washer in a hotel in Dartmouth. Whilst there he heard, from the head chef, of a job opening as an apprentice estimator on the Youth Training Scheme at Midas Construction. He did not qualify for the position but was taken on as a tea boy, turning down a position as a radio operator with the Royal Navy to do so; having had experience of unskilled work he worked "like a maniac" to pass his exams and gain qualifications. Fitzgerald attended a building studies course at South Devon College between 1982 and 1986.

In 1992, at the age of 28, the head of Midas Construction, Len Lewis, asked Fitzgerald to set up a housebuilding division at the firm and take a 15% stake in it. Fitzgerald was initially reluctant, considering housebuilding as a job for "pansies" and concerned about the business' prospects in the early 1990s recession. However the business did well and in 1997 was sold to Galliford for £5 million; Fitzgerald subsequently co-founded Gerald Wood Homes and within two years also sold it to Galliford (which became Galliford Try in 2000).

== Galliford Try ==
Shortly after the sale of Gerald Wood Homes Fitzgerald was brought into Galliford Try to head its housebuilding division. He became the company's chief executive officer (CEO) in 2005. His initial actions were to increase revenues in its construction division before focusing on housebuilding. He led the company's £244 million acquisition of Linden Homes in 2007, at the height of the housing boom. Following the Great Recession he implemented a £125 million rights issue to take advantage of the fall in land prices, a move described as "audacious" by industry watchers. He also instigated the purchase of Miller Construction in 2014, increasing the company's annual construction turnover to £1.25 billion. Fitzgerald resigned as CEO at the end of 2015, remaining with the company first as executive chairman and then as a non-executive director until his retirement in November 2016. Because of the acquisition history Fitzgerald has been reported as having spent 33 years at Galliford and having risen from tea boy to chief executive at the same company.

== Bovis Homes ==
Four months into his retirement Fitzgerald was offered the position of CEO of Bovis Homes. The company was in financial trouble owing to poor customer relations – having moved people into new houses which were not finished or had defects. His appointment headed off acquisition bids by fellow top-10 UK housebuilders Galliford Try and Redrow. Fitzgerald immediately invested £3 million of his own money into the company and embarked on a tour of its sites to raise morale and determine the problems the company faced. His main objective was to raise levels of customer satisfaction. He also implemented reform of the company's training and apprenticeship programs. Within eight months his actions had raised the share price by 30%.

== Personal life and personality ==
Fitzgerald is regarded as a straight talking "likeable, sweary leader". He has also been described as "ballsy" and popular amongst investment analysts. Fitzgerald is an advocate of reform of the Help to Buy scheme in the form of a levy to bring in revenue for the government from housebuilders and for high earners, including himself, to pay more tax.

Fitzgerald is a supporter of the Wales national rugby union team and Manchester United F.C.
