= Mears Group =

UK for-profit housing and social care provider

Mears Group plc
- Traded as: LSE: MER
- Founded: 1996
- Headquarters: Gloucester
- Key people: Jim Clarke (Chairman); Lucas Critchley (CEO)
- Products: Repairs and maintenance, Care services, development, GIS & land referencing
- Revenue: ▲£1,135.5 million (2025)
- Operating income: ▲£75.0 million (2025)
- Net income: ▼£45.9 million (2025)
- Website: www.mearsgroup.co.uk

Mears Group plc is a housing and social care provider. It repairs and maintains over 700,000 social homes across the UK.

== History ==
The company was founded in 1988 in Gloucestershire, where it is still based, was initially focused on the social housing sector as a contractor. In 1996, Mears Group was acquired by Bob Holt, who promptly took over management of the firm and embarked on an ambitious plan to greatly expand the business. That same year, it was floated on the Alternative Investment Market of the London Stock Exchange as Mears Group plc. The late 1990s and early 2000s were a particularly prosperous time for the company; between 1996 and 2003, recorded profits increase at an annual compound rate of 42 per cent while its share value sometimes doubled within a single 12-month period, vastly outpacing the AIM average rates.

Buoyed by strong financial performance, Mears Group adopted a strong acquisitive stance, albeit one that was largely restricted to within the facilities management sector, during this period. In 1999, the installer Haydon & Co was its first large acquisition. During 2007, Mears Group bought Careforce. One year later, the company was transferred to the main market on the London Stock Exchange.

Despite events such as the Credit Crunch and the Great Recession, Mears Group continued to return strong results. Throughout the late 2000s and early 2010s, social housing was a particularly strong performing area for the business, to the extent that management sought to expand the firm's presence in the repair subsector. In contrast, the firm decided to withdraw from the solar photovoltaic market in response to decreasing feed-in tariffs.

During 2011, the group took over more than 20 Home Improvement Services from Anchor; one year later, it acquired Morrison Facilities Services from AWG plc. In 2013, the firm acquired Independent Living Services Scotland and launched Mears Nurseplus, enabling the company to offer health services as well as social care. Nurseplus (specialising in the care of adult and paediatric service users with complex health conditions, both acute and chronic that require clinical intervention and management) was awarded a place on the NHS framework contract to supply staff into NHS establishments across Scotland in November 2014.

In October 2014, it took over Omega Group Ltd., a private sector provider of residential lettings and management services to the social housing market. In December 2014, Torbay and Southern Devon Health and Care NHS Trust named the Group as the preferred bidder to run its Living Well@Home Services contract, integrating IT systems and deliver a range of community-based services for a minimum of five years.

During June 2015, Mears Group bought Care UK's home care division, with about 6,000 employees for £11.3 million. Subsequently renamed Mears Care, it looked after roughly 13,000 people at that time.

In December 2016, executive director Alan Long announced that the company was pulling out of contracts with local authorities because it could not afford to operate on the money it was being paid. By June 2017, attributing its decision to challenging market conditions, Mears Group reduced the size of its care businesses by roughly 20 per cent; at this point, the housing sector was seen as a more viable business area.

In December 2018, it was announced that, after 23 years as chief executive, Bob Holt was stepping down from active involvement in Mears Group and would be replaced by Kieran Murphy.

In January 2019, it was announced that Mears Group would take over a Home Office contract to provide housing for asylum seekers in Glasgow from Serco. At the start of the COVID-19 pandemic Mears moved 350 asylum seekers from living in their own private apartments to living in six hotels across the city, reducing their independence and reducing their ability to social distance, often being moved with little or no prior notice. At the same time, the Home Office suspended the £5.37 per day support payment that they had been receiving, leaving asylum seekers fully dependent on the services provided by Mears, and in some cases unable to communicate with friends, family, solicitors or any external support. Charities like Refuweegee and Scottish Refugee Council drew attention to the conditions that people were being held in calling on the UK Government and their contractor Mears to restore the support payments and move people back into private accommodation.

On 5 May 2020, Adnan Walid Elbi, a Syrian refugee, was found dead in his room at the Mclays Guest House in Glasgow. Elbi's father had been murdered by ISIS in 2018, his youngest brother was kidnapped by ISIS in 2019, and Elbi himself had been detained and tortured by Ansar al-Sharia. Elbi had repeatedly told authorities about previous suicide attempts and ongoing suicidal ideation including the week before his death.

In June 2020, Badreddin Abadlla Adam, a Sudanese asylum seeker being cared for by Mears in a hotel in Glasgow city centre stabbed three fellow asylum seekers, two hotel staff and a responding police officer with a knife. Adam was shot dead by armed police officers but the six stabbing victims survived. A report by the Home Affairs Select Committee in July 2020 advised that asylum seekers "should not have been moved to new accommodation during the pandemic without justified and urgent reasons for doing so, or without a vulnerability assessment demonstrating that the move could be made safely."

In August 2020, Mercy Baguma was discovered dead in her Govan flat beside her one-year-old child. Baguma had been working in a restaurant to support herself, but after her leave to remain had expired she wasn't allowed to work, meaning she was dependent on others for support including the asylum system.

In January 2020, it announced that Mears Group intended to sell its domiciliary care division, which employed 1,500 people across 18 branches in England and Wales and 1,000 people across 16 branches in Scotland at that time; the firm stated that it would to concentrate on the provision of housing with care. Accordingly, the division was sold to Cera Care one month later.

In July 2020, Cornwall Council confirmed Mears Group as lead strategic partner for the delivery of extra care in Cornwall with a seven-year agreement for 750 extra care housing units worth £150 million.

== Political involvement ==
Mears Group was nominated as a Social Mobility Business Compact ‘Champion’ after signing the Social Mobility Business Compact, set up by the Deputy Prime Minister Nick Clegg in 2011, to encourage employers to offer young people fair and open access to employment opportunities.

The group, with the Local Government Information Unit, supported a report, in December 2014 by former care minister Paul Burstow calling for home care workers to be given key workers status and a living wage.
