= Glasgow hotel stabbings =

Stabbing attack

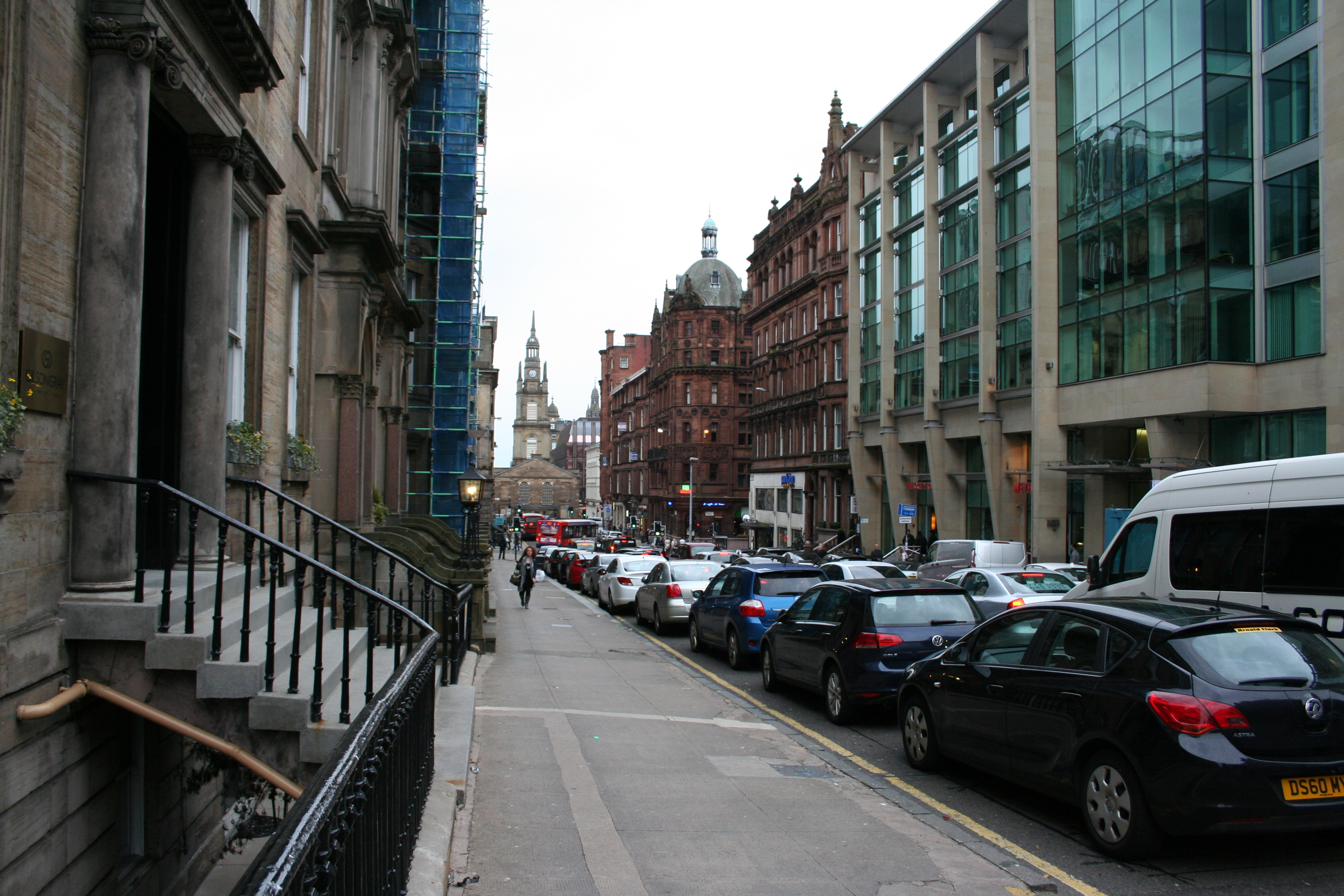
- West George Street, Glasgow, Scotland, where the Park Inn Hotel is located
- Date: 26 June 2020
- Time: ~12.50 pm
- Location: Park Inn Hotel, Glasgow, Scotland; 55.86223°N 4.25732°W
- Target: Hotel guests and staff
- Deaths: 1 (the perpetrator)
- Injuries: 6
- Suspects: Badreddin Abadlla Adam

On 26 June 2020, a mass stabbing attack took place in the Park Inn Hotel, Glasgow, Scotland. Six people, including a police officer, were seriously injured. The attacker, Badreddin Abadlla Adam, was shot dead by police at the scene.

== Incident ==
At approximately 12:50 pm on 26 June 2020, a man stabbed six people in the Park Inn Hotel, West George Street in the city centre of Glasgow, Scotland.

The attacker was cornered in an upstairs room of the hotel where he was shot dead by a police officer. Earlier, a police officer had responded to the initial call for emergency services to attend the scene and was injured shortly after arriving at the hotel. Armed response units were then called to the scene, before evacuating all staff members and asylum seekers to safety before attempting to apprehend the attacker.

== Victims ==
The attacker stabbed and injured six people, including a police officer and hotel staff. The 42-year-old male police officer confronted the attacker and suffered serious injuries to his neck, abdomen, and leg. He later recovered and left the hospital. A 17-year-old boy from Sierra Leone was stabbed in his abdomen after a struggle with the attacker. The other injured men are two asylum seekers and two hotel staff members, aged 18, 20, 38, and 53; all were admitted into hospital. One was in critical condition.

At the time of the attack, the Park Inn Hotel had been closed to all potential guests due to the COVID-19 pandemic, and was instead being used by Mears Group to accommodate asylum seekers. A spokeswoman for the campaign group Positive Action In Housing said the hotel was housing asylum seekers for the Mears Group, a housing and social care provider; 100 asylum seekers were said to have been residing there.

== Attacker ==
The attacker, Badreddin Abadlla Adam, was a 28-year-old male asylum seeker from Sudan who had arrived in the UK six months earlier. He went on a rampage after numerous reports had been made to the relevant authorities by charities and other asylum seekers residing in Park Inn Hotel, who were concerned about his deteriorating mental health, and the potential risk he posed to himself and others.

== Investigation ==
Police Scotland announced that the stabbing was not being treated as a terrorist incident.

Police Scotland Assistant Chief Constable Steve Johnson said, "As would be the case in any police discharge of firearms involving a fatality, the Crown Office and Procurator Fiscal Service has instructed the Police Investigations and Review Commissioner to investigate."

Detectives are investigating whether the attacker was in any way inspired by the mass stabbing attack in Reading six days prior.

== Reactions ==
Prime Minister Boris Johnson said he was "deeply saddened by the terrible incident in Glasgow".

First Minister Nicola Sturgeon wrote on Twitter that her "thoughts are with everyone involved". She requested that the public stay away from the area and that they avoid sharing unconfirmed information.
