= Motion Equity Partners =

French private equity firm

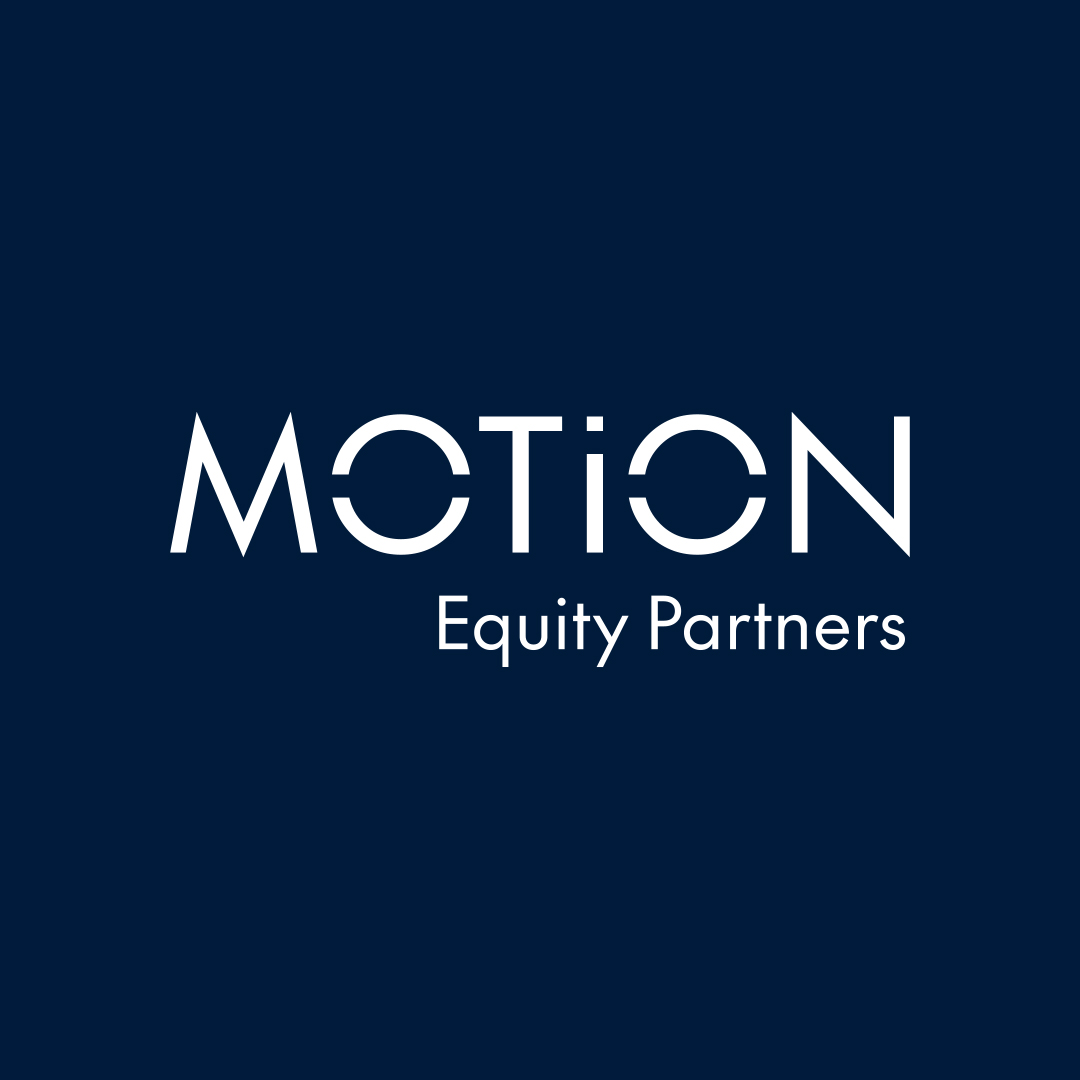
- Company type: Private
- Industry: Private equity
- Predecessor: Electra Partners Europe
- Founded: 1989
- Headquarters: Paris, France
- Products: Leveraged buyout, Growth capital
- Total assets: €1.0 billion
- Number of employees: 15
- Website: www.motion-ep.com

Motion Equity Partners is a private equity firm focused on leveraged buyout and growth capital investments in European middle-market companies across a range of industries.

The firm, has office in Paris. It was founded in 1989 as Electra Partners Europe and affiliate of Electra Private Equity, a listed investment trust.

== History ==
Motion Equity Partners raised its first fund in 2000, with €1.0 billion of investor commitments. Among the investments in that portfolio were Rank Leisure, Azelis, Baxi, Safety-Kleen, Aliplast, Global Solutions, Covenant Healthcare, Ashbourne Healthcare and Diana Ingrédients.

In 2005, it completed a spinout from its investment trust parent. It raised its second fund the following year, with total commitments amounting to €1.25 billion.

Led by Managing Partner Patrick Eisenchteter, the firm rebranded as Motion Equity Partners in 2011 and refocused on the mid-cap segment. The firm targets investments up to €300m in enterprise value. It has currently 9 portfolio companies : Axience, Banook, Tournaire, Résilians, Omni-Pac, Learnation, Olmix and Olyos.

== Investments ==
Motion Equity Partners have held a number of company asset investments over the years, including:

=== Current Investments ===
Entry	Exit	Company Name	Business description	Country	Ref.
February 2024	Unrealised	Axience	Reference French specialist vet lab for pharma & OTC products	France	
November 2023	Unrealised	Banook Group	Cardiac safety specialist in the context of clinical trials	France	
September 2022	Unrealised	Tounaire	Specialist in highperformance industrial packaging	France	
September 2021	Unrealised	Résilians	Leading player in post-disaster intervention in France	France	
December 2020	Unrealised	Learnation	French leading player in digital vocational training and tutoring	France	
October 2020	Unrealised	Omlix Group	Global specialist of natural solutions for sustainable farming	France	
December 2017	Unrealised	Olyos Group	European pharma lab specialised in oligotherapy and food supplements	France	
November 2014	Unrealised	Omni-Pac	Leading European player in the moulded fibre packaging market	France	

=== Realised Investments ===
Entry	Exit	Company Name	Business description	Country	Ref.
2018	2022	Holweg Weber Group	Sustainable packaging	France	
2017	2022	Minlay	Manufacturing and distribution of dental prosthetics	France	
2016	2020	Altaïr	Household care products	France	
2008	2015	Morrison Utility Services	Infrastructure services	United Kingdom	
2005	2015	Tokheim	Fuel dispensers	France	
2008	2015	Fullsix Group	Media industry	Italy	
2004	2014	Diana	Pet food industry	France	
2006	2012	Ixetix	Development of high performance hydraulic pumps	Germany	
2004	2006	Aliplast	Aluminium profiles for doors, windows and verandas	France	

== See also ==
- Electra Private Equity
