= Human decontamination =

Process of removing hazardous materials from the human body

Human decontamination is the process of removing hazardous materials from the human body, including chemicals, radioactive substances, and infectious material.

== General principle ==
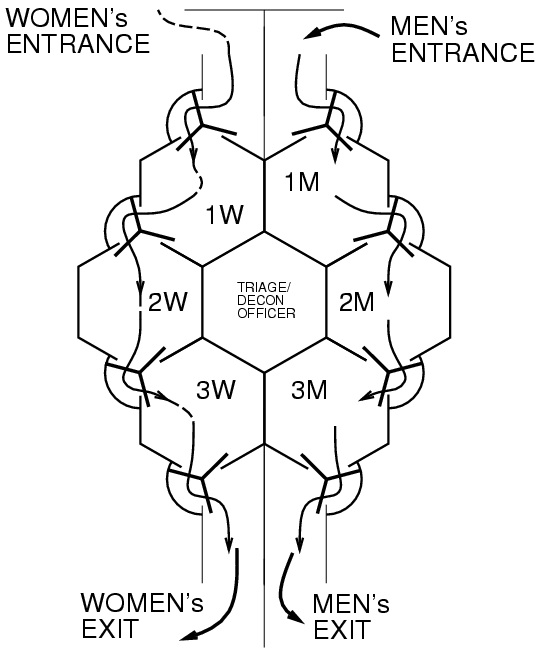
Decontamination of humans is usually done by a three-step procedure, separated by sex: removal of clothing, washing, and reclothing.

People suspected of being contaminated are usually separated by sex, and led into a decontamination tent, trailer, or pod, where they shed their potentially contaminated clothes in a strip-down room. They then enter a wash-down room where they are showered. Finally, they enter a drying and re-robing room to be issued clean clothing, a jumpsuit, or other attire. Some more structured facilities include six rooms (strip-down, wash-down and examination rooms, for each of men's and women's side as per attached drawing). Some facilities, such as MODEC, and many others, are remotely operable, and function like "human car washes". Common lathering in soap removes external dust that may contain radioisotopes. It is advised that when lathering, effort should be made not to spread potential dust that deposited onto exposed, unclothed areas of skin, to areas that were once likely clean.

Mass decontamination is the decontamination of large numbers of people. The ACI World Aviation Security Standing Committee describes a decontamination process thus, specifically referring to plans for Los Angeles authorities:

The disinfection/decontamination process is akin to putting humans through a car wash after first destroying their garments. Los Angeles World Airports have put in place a contingency plan to disinfect up to 10,000 persons who might have been exposed to biological or chemical substances.

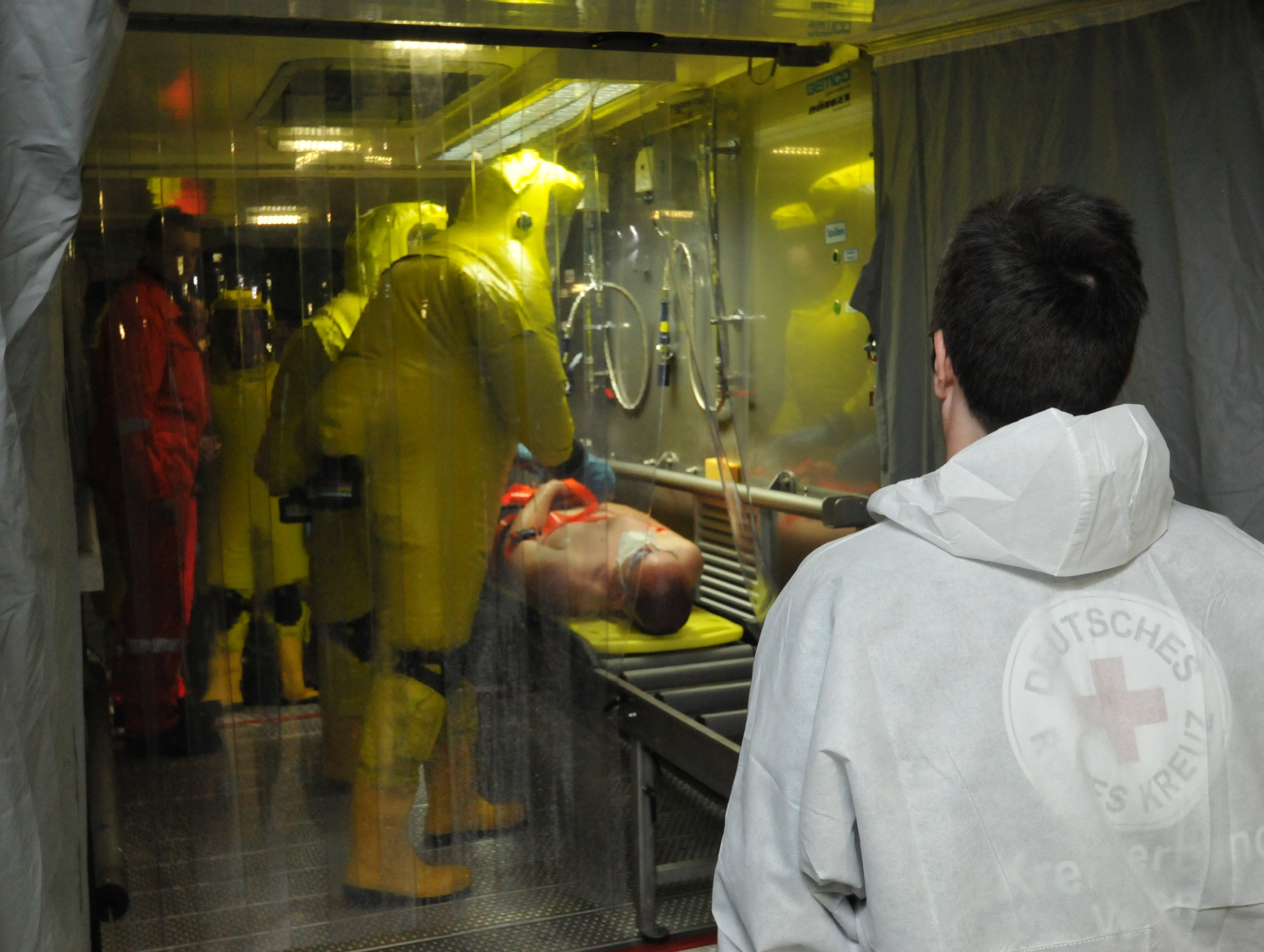
Decontamination of injured victim

== Hospital decontamination ==
Most hospitals in the United States are prepared to handle a large influx of patients from a terrorist attack. Volunteer hospital decontamination teams are common and trained to set up showers or washing equipment, to wear personal protective equipment, and to ensure the safety of both the victims and the community during the response. From a planning perspective it must be remembered that first responders in Level A or B personal protective equipment (PPE) will have a limited working duration, typically 20 minutes to 2 hours.

Typically these teams use decontamination showers built into the hospital or tents which are set up outside in order to decontaminate individuals. Beyond terrorism incidents, common exposures may be related to factory spills, agricultural incidents, and vehicle accidents. Incidents are common in both urban and rural communities. Hospital decontamination is a component of the Hospital Incident Command System and is required in the standards set forth by the Joint Commission.

== Decontamination exercises ==
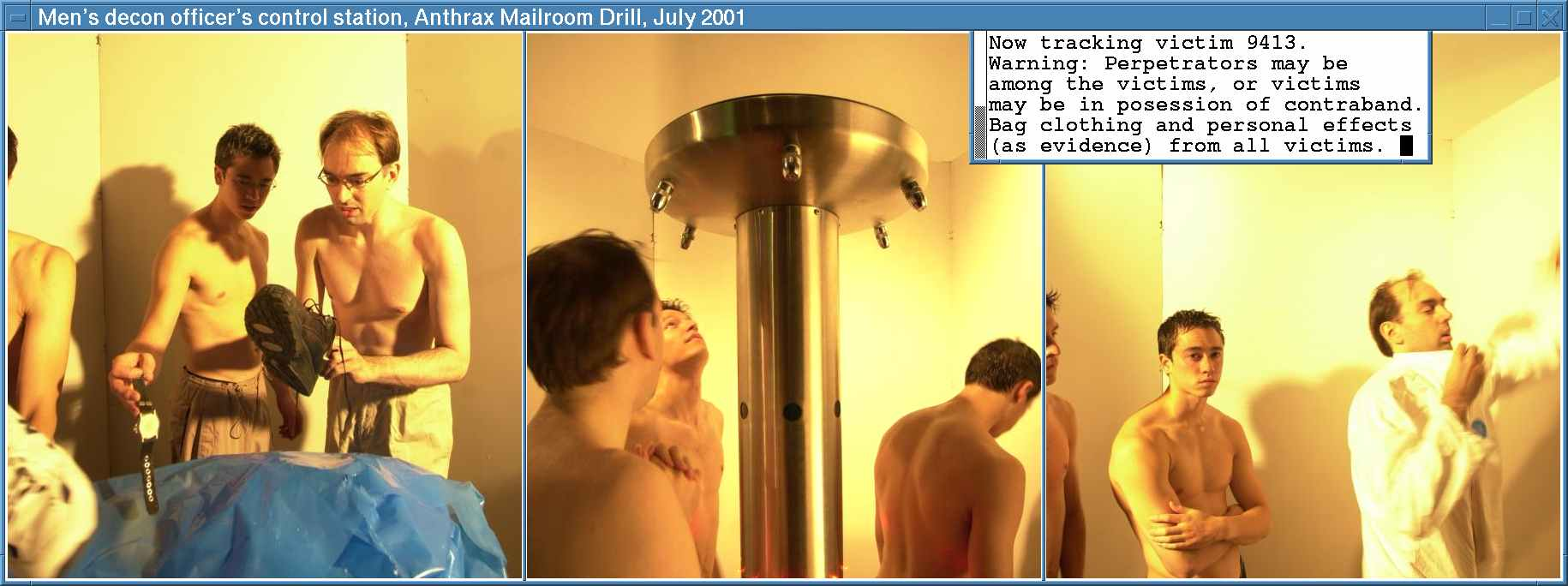
Decontamination exercises are frequently used to test the preparedness of emergency plans and personnel.

Exercises are of three types:

- Tabletop – An exercise held with responsible personnel in which a facilitator relays information about a scenario to the group. The group then discusses the actions they each would take in the given situation. There is no "live response" or use of assets. The table top is a low impact, low stress method to review emergency plans.
- Functional – A functional exercise involves the agencies involved in an Emergency Operations Center, a scenario is presented and the players go through the actions they would if it were a real incident. The exercise tests the technical resources and plans of the Emergency Operations Center. There is no "live response" outside of the Emergency Operations Center.
- Full Scale – A full-scale exercise is the most involved type of exercise and the most difficult to plan and execute. Full-scale exercises can vary in size from one agency or municipality to multinational exercises such as the US Government-led annual TOPOFF exercise. In a full-scale exercise, a scenario is created and acted out in a real-world manner. Responders are expected to act in accordance with established plans, just as they would in a real incident. At times, certain parts of the exercise have to be simulated due to equipment, financial, or safety reasons, which can make the scenario confusing. Full-scale exercises are often used as an opportunity to test and assess an agency's true level of preparedness.

== Unified command ==
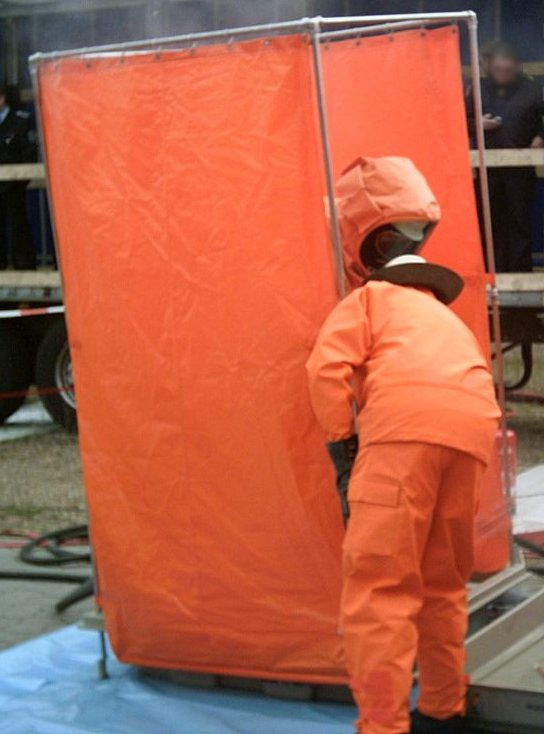
Decontamination of persons during a fire brigade exercise employment (Germany)

Collaboration among various levels of authority, and among various countries, is required to address bioterror threats, because contamination knows no boundaries. Disease and contamination do not stop at the border from one country to another. Thus organizations such as NATO bring together member countries to practice how to contain an outbreak, setup quarantine facilities, and care for displaced persons.

== Collection of personal belongings for evidence ==
"Dofficers" (Decontamination officers in the "doffing" or disrobing area) are often police or military personnel, ready to handle potentially unruly persons who refuse to cooperate with first responders.

For example, the U.S. ARMY SOLDIER AND BIOLOGICAL CHEMICAL COMMAND suggests that:

"The entire incident is a crime scene requiring the collection of criminal evidence and suspicious victim belongings. The preservation of a proper chain of custody must be maintained for all evidence. ... patients could be suspects and their belongings may be evidence. ... Direct patients through a detailed decontamination process and deal with potentially unruly patients. ... Enforce order when persons become uncooperative when asked to remove clothing and relinquish personal items.".

Paul Rega, M.D., FACEP, and Kelly Burkholder-Allen also note, in "The ABCs of Bioterrorism", an additional advantage in decontaminating everyone found at the scene of an incident, because this will help the authorities in searching through everyone's clothes to find suspicious items:

"Removal of clothing in the decon procedure has the additional advantage of detecting weapons or a secondary device on a victim or "pseudo-victim".

Chris Seiple, in "Another Perspective on the Domestic Role of the Military in Consequence Management", suggests that the evidence gathering process of identifying contaminated people and their belongings should also include the process of video surveillance:

The identification of contaminated victims and their personal effects... Victims are also videotaped as they proceed through the decontamination line.

Video Surveillance... Videotaped documentation could later be used in the evidence processes;

Although there are the obvious privacy concerns in surveillance, one can also argue that due to the high risk nature of terrorism, such surveillance is warranted, as it is in other high risk areas like bathing complexes where surveillance is often used because of the risk of drowning. In these cases the importance of safety may often be thought to outweigh privacy concerns.

== Handling uncooperative victims ==
One of the elements that separates a drill from a real-life situation is dealing with panicked or uncooperative victims. Security personnel should be assigned to the area for crowd control and to ensure appropriate flow of individuals in and out of the decontamination area.

In a real attack, the perpetrators may be among the victims, or some of the victims may be in possession of contraband, or of evidence that might help law enforcement in solving the crime.

Another consideration is that some of the perpetrator victims might refuse to go through decon because this would result in discovery of the contraband they may be hiding.

For example, a person with explosives strapped to his or her body, under their clothing, would likely not be so willing to take it off. Such a victim might try to escape, and need to be restrained for decontamination.

Separate male and female officers (decontamination officers) deal with potentially unruly patients, by restraining the hands using flex cuffs, and cutting off the shirt, then removing shoes and pants normally. This usually requires a couple of officers.

The Belfast Telegraph describes such a situation:

"...holds back hundreds of extras playing traumatised bomb victims. Coated in ash and wrapped up in bandages, these people are staggering around, dazed and confused, like so many shell-shocked World War I soldiers. While troops in riot gear charge forward to reinforce the cordon and use their shields and batons to beat back ... desperately appeal for calm. They ask people to file in an orderly fashion towards the decontamination units being rapidly assembled by fire fighters in inflated orange Chemical Biological Radiation Nuclear (CBRN) suits."

See also Battalion Chief Michael Farri:

They bring a law enforcement agency group with them and they have no problem if somebody needs to be restrained with handcuffs or flex cuffs or whatever to keep them from going from the hot zone to a cool zone; whereas the fire department, we are not geared to do that.... Kwame Holman: Colonel Hammes says his Marines are trained to handle uncooperative people. ... If they're really hysterical, there's some simple techniques from this program called Marine Martial Arts, that teaches various martial arts skills; there are common techniques that police also use to provide pain compliance-- no permanent damage, just enough to get your attention, and allows us to control you. If you still won't, then we can control in flex cuffs, and then we'll flex cuff decontaminate you. And if you're calm at that point, we turn you loose. If you're still not calm, then the police will be asked to give us a hand.

== Internal human contamination ==
Radioactive contamination can enter the body through ingestion, inhalation, absorption, or injection. This will result in a committed dose of radiation.

For this reason, it is important to use personal protective equipment when working with radioactive materials. Radioactive contamination may also be ingested as the result of eating contaminated plants and animals or drinking contaminated water or milk from exposed animals. Following a major contamination incident, all potential pathways of internal exposure should be considered.

Successfully used on Harold McCluskey, chelation therapy and other treatments exist for internal radionuclide contamination.

== See also ==
- Contamination control
- DeconGel
- Decontamination foam
- Disease surveillance
- Fukushima disaster cleanup
- Incident Support Unit
- Mass decontamination
- Radioactive contamination
