= Diphoterine =

First aid wash agent

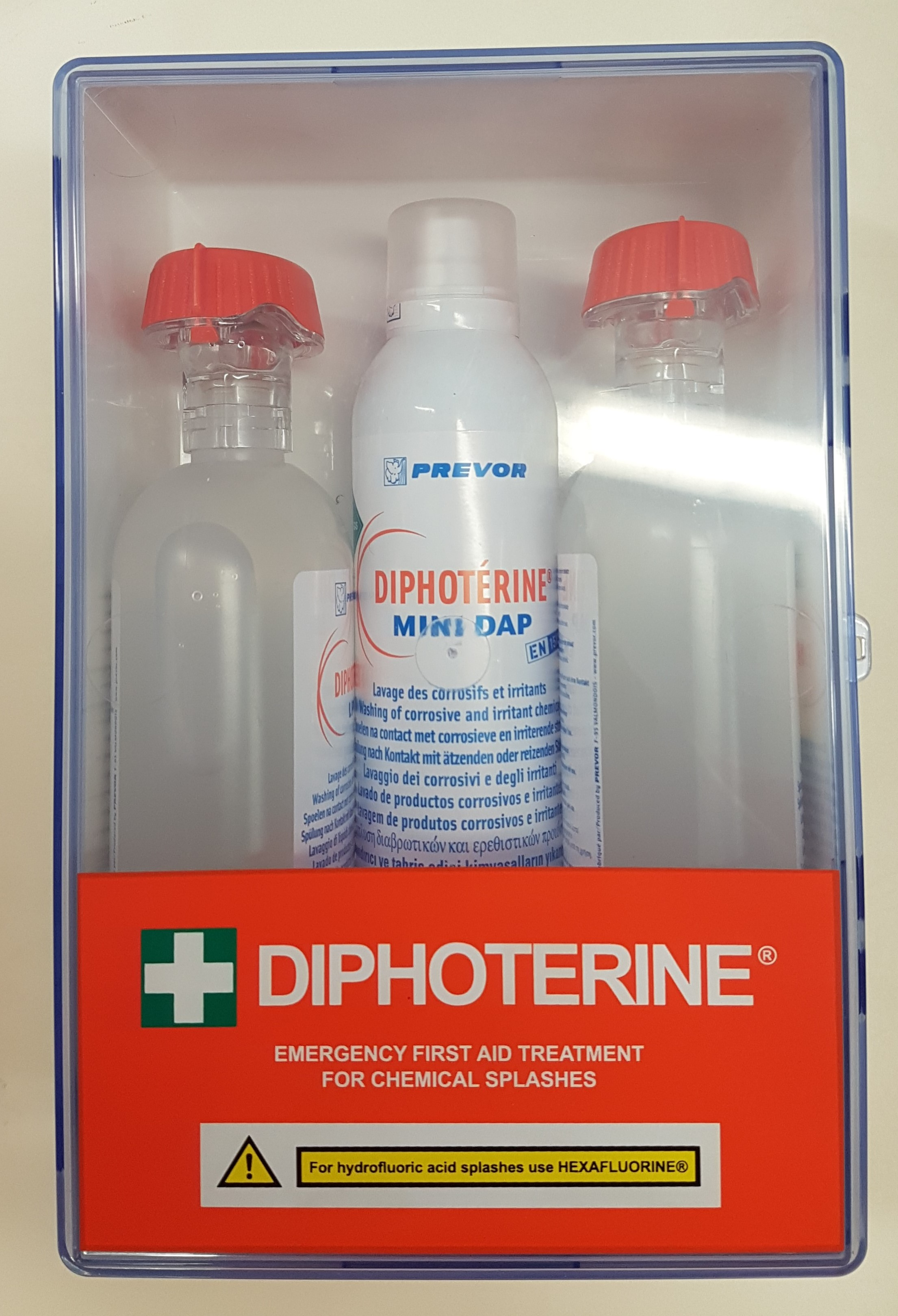
Emergency eye-wash containing Diphoterine

Diphoterine is a decontamination solution used in first aid for the emergency treatment of chemical spills to the eyes and body.

== Mechanism of action ==
Diphoterine solution contains an amphoteric, chelating molecule: a substance which is capable of reacting with both acids and alkalis when applied to either type of chemical spill, stopping the aggressive action of a corrosive or irritant chemical, halting the reaction with the body.

However, it is not fully effective at halting the body's reaction with hydrofluoric acid. This is because hydrofluoric acid is poisonous as well as corrosive. Treatment with either Hexafluorine or calcium gluconate is required to deal with hydrofluoric acid contamination.

Like all of the emergency treatments, Diphoterine solution is not a substitute for professional medical attention, so immediate attention from emergency medical personnel should always be sought, especially if the chemical spill was to the eye.

== Effectiveness ==
The efficacy of the Diphoterine solution has been shown to be effective in a two-year study on humans and also in a study on animals. Its effectiveness as compared to use of water alone, and therefore its necessity, has been questioned by some medical experts. On the other hand these statements do not provide any studies that compare the effectiveness of the Diphoterine solution compare to water. The largest case series reported to date does compare the effectiveness of water and the Diphoterine solution. "One hundred eighty cases of alkali splashes to the skin were evaluated clinically. Two groups were compared; those who had applied Diphoterine first and those who had applied water first." Here are the results of this independent study: "There were no signs of chemical burn in 52.9% of the group who applied Diphoterine first compared with 21.4% of the group who applied water first. Only 7.9% of the group who applied Diphoterine first had blisters or more severe signs compared with 23.8% of the group who applied water first. The differences were statistically significant (P < 0.001). After implementation of Diphoterine the "first aid" injury rate for chemical burns fell 24.7% (95% CI 0.5–43.0%)."

== See also ==
- DeconGel
- Eyewash
