= Mass decontamination =

Decontamination of large numbers of people

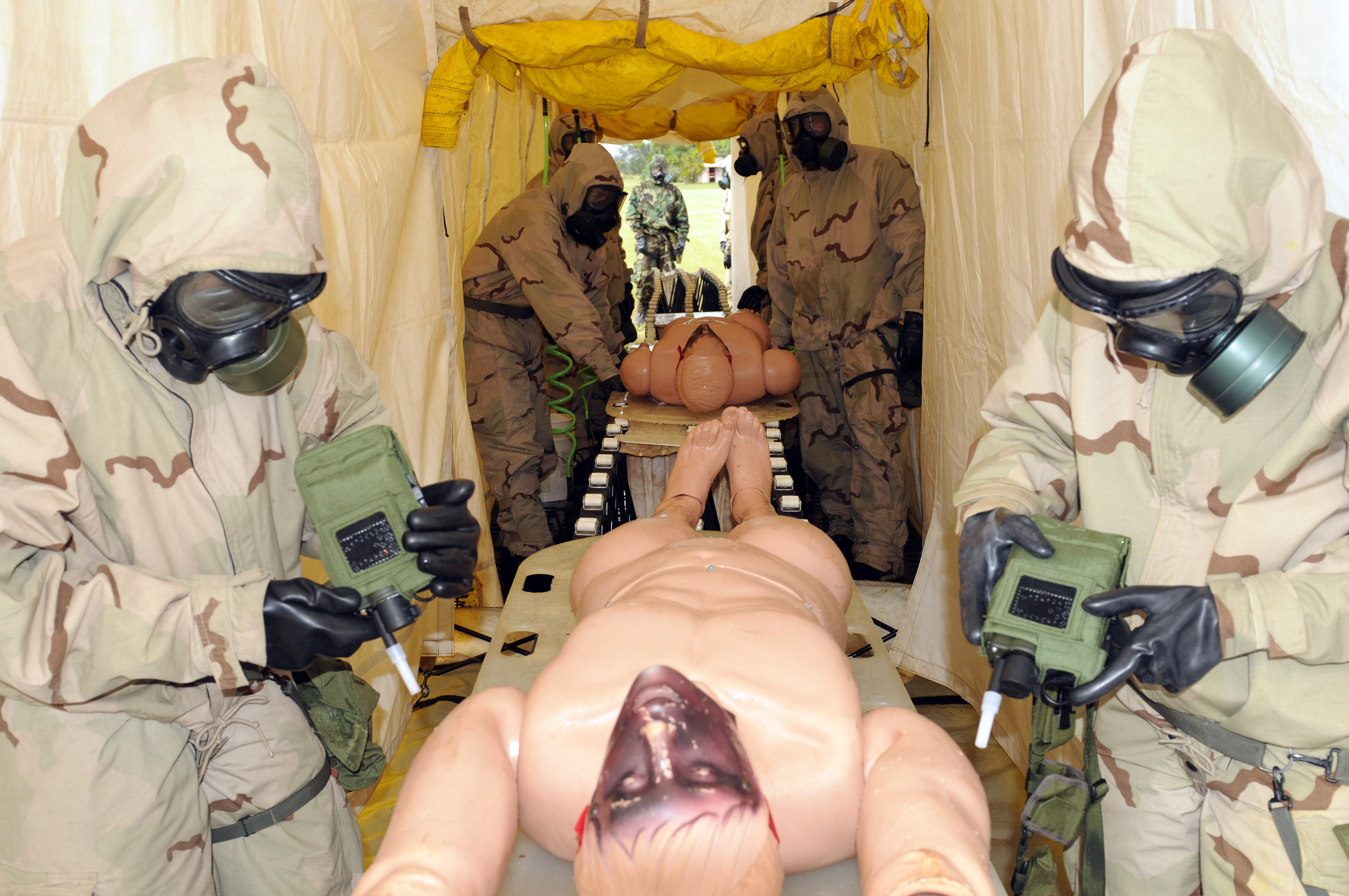
Mass casualty decontamination portion of an all hazards training exercise, c.2014

Mass decontamination (abbreviated mass decon) is the decontamination of large numbers of people, in the event of industrial, accidental, or intentional contamination by toxic, infective, caustic, polluted, or otherwise unhealthful or damaging substances.

== Mass hysteria and security aspects ==
Scenes of mass contamination are often scenes of collective hysteria, with hundreds or thousands of victims in a state of panic. Therefore, mass decontamination may require police, security, or rescue supervision to help control panic and keep order. Under these circumstances, mass decon can take on some features of mass arrests, with victims forcibly rounded up, then treated inside impromptu detention areas. Successful municipal decontaminations are greatly aided by a close collaboration between police and fire departments. An organised, informed and aware populace can be better prepared for possible emergencies, and is less likely to panic. In some situations volunteers may be needed to augment or replace rescue/security personnel to help maintain calm and/or assist with decontamination procedures.

For example, the Australian "Workplace Relations Act 1996" calls for detention of victims of a hazardous materials (hazmat) incident:

- The ACTFB has also gained additional powers under the Emergencies Act 2004 to detain people at a HazMat/CBR incident.

The Federal Emergency Management Agency (FEMA) also suggests that:

- victims... might be detained for... decontamination.

Even some of the clear-thinking subjects may resist efforts to decontaminate them. Those who know or think they have not been contaminated may resist being herded into close quarters with sick or toxin-ridden victims who still have the potential to harm those nearby. Those carrying weapons or some form of contraband may require force to part them from their contaminated clothes and effects. Others may simply fear contact with the authorities, as well as separation from family and loss of job resulting from quarantines, more than they fear the contaminant.

Military groups, church groups, Boy Scouts groups, Girl Guides, businesses, etc. can prepare for possible contaminations by performing drills of decontamination procedures. This can have the effect of decreasing the likelihood of panic, and allowing for faster, more successful decontamination.

== Mass decontamination equipment ==
Mass decontamination is performed by way of decontamination tents, trailers, or fixed facilities. Most hospitals and airports have at least one mass decontamination facility. Some newer airports have a mobile facility that can generate decontamination foam in large quantities.

LAX - Los Angeles International Airport has a decontamination system with four soap cannons to spray down hysterical crowds. The facility features pop up tents so that once soaped, the victims can file on either side of the rig (one gender on each side) to rinse in specially designed showers where they can remove all clothing, dry off, and receive replacement clothing or other suitable modesty garb (i.e., makeshift clothing such as bedsheets, tablecloths, or garbage bags with head and arm cutouts).

== US Federal Guidance ==
Revised procedures have been published as part of the PRISM (Primary Response Incident Scene Management) Guidance, which incorporates new evidence-based approaches to mass casualty decontamination.

== See also ==
- Contamination control
