= Claudio Feliciani =

Swiss–Italian crowd-dynamics scientist

- Born: September 6, 1985 (age 41); Mendrisio, Switzerland
- Citizenship: Switzerland; Italy
- Education: ETH Zurich (BSc, MSc); University of Tokyo (PhD)
- Known for: Research on pedestrian crowds; co-winner of the 2021 Ig Nobel Prize in Kinetics
- Awards: Ig Nobel Prize (2021); University of Tokyo Dean's Award (2018)
- Scientific career
- Fields: Crowd dynamics, pedestrian dynamics, crowd safety
- Workplaces: University of Tokyo
- Thesis: Measurement and numerical modeling of pedestrian flows (2017)

Claudio Feliciani (born 6 September 1985) is a Swiss-Italian researcher who specialises in the modelling, measurement and management of pedestrian crowds, additionally working on collective animal behavior and complex systems. He is a Project Associate Professor at the University of Tokyo, where he works on projects related to real-time crowd monitoring and safety.

== Early life and education ==
Feliciani was born in Mendrisio, in the Italian-speaking canton of Ticino, Switzerland. After completing a scientific high-school diploma, he earned a Bachelor of Science in mechanical engineering (2007) at ETH Zurich and a Master of Science in nuclear engineering (2010) at EPF Lausanne and ETH Zurich. In 2017, he was awarded a PhD in engineering from the University of Tokyo, working on the numerical evaluation of crowd movement.

== Career ==
From 2011 to 2014 Feliciani carried out R&D on polymer flows at Mitsubishi Electric's Advanced Technology Research Centre in Japan. In 2017, he became Project Assistant Professor at the University of Tokyo and, in 2020, Project Associate Professor in the Research Center for Advanced Science and Technology (RCAST). He develops sensing and simulation tools that help organisers monitor congestion, "nudge" pedestrian route choices and prevent crowd accidents.

== Research ==
Feliciani's work combines laboratory experiments, large-scale field studies and agent-based models to explain how pedestrians self-organise, how dangerous bottlenecks form, and how subtle environmental cues can steer flows safely. In 2022, he co-authored the textbook Introduction to Crowd Management – Managing Crowds in the Digital Era: Theory and Practice (Springer). The 2021 Science Advances paper he co-authored on mutual anticipation in crowds earned the Ig Nobel Prize in Kinetics.

== Awards ==
- Ig Nobel Prize in Kinetics (shared, 2021) for experiments explaining why pedestrians sometimes collide.
- Dean's Award, Faculty of Engineering, University of Tokyo (2018).

== Selected works ==
- Murakami, H., Feliciani, C., Nishiyama, Y., & Nishinari, K. (2021). "Mutual Anticipation Can Contribute to Self-Organisation in Human Crowds." Science Advances, 7(12), eabe7758.
- Feliciani, C., & Nishinari, K. (2016). "Empirical Analysis of the Lane Formation Process in Bidirectional Pedestrian Flow." Physical Review E, 94(3), 032304.
- Feliciani, C., & Nishinari, K. (2018). "Measurement of Congestion and Intrinsic Risk in Pedestrian Crowds." Transportation Research Part C, 91, 124-155.
- Feliciani, C., Shimura, K., & Nishinari, K. (2022). Introduction to Crowd Management – Managing Crowds in the Digital Era: Theory and Practice. Springer Nature.
