= Halogen =

Group of chemical elements

Halogens
Hydrogen																															Helium
Lithium	Beryllium																									Boron	Carbon	Nitrogen	Oxygen	Fluorine	Neon
Sodium	Magnesium																									Aluminium	Silicon	Phosphorus	Sulfur	Chlorine	Argon
Potassium	Calcium															Scandium	Titanium	Vanadium	Chromium	Manganese	Iron	Cobalt	Nickel	Copper	Zinc	Gallium	Germanium	Arsenic	Selenium	Bromine	Krypton
Rubidium	Strontium															Yttrium	Zirconium	Niobium	Molybdenum	Technetium	Ruthenium	Rhodium	Palladium	Silver	Cadmium	Indium	Tin	Antimony	Tellurium	Iodine	Xenon
Caesium	Barium	Lanthanum	Cerium	Praseodymium	Neodymium	Promethium	Samarium	Europium	Gadolinium	Terbium	Dysprosium	Holmium	Erbium	Thulium	Ytterbium	Lutetium	Hafnium	Tantalum	Tungsten	Rhenium	Osmium	Iridium	Platinum	Gold	Mercury (element)	Thallium	Lead	Bismuth	Polonium	Astatine	Radon
Francium	Radium	Actinium	Thorium	Protactinium	Uranium	Neptunium	Plutonium	Americium	Curium	Berkelium	Californium	Einsteinium	Fermium	Mendelevium	Nobelium	Lawrencium	Rutherfordium	Dubnium	Seaborgium	Bohrium	Hassium	Meitnerium	Darmstadtium	Roentgenium	Copernicium	Nihonium	Flerovium	Moscovium	Livermorium	Tennessine	Oganesson
chalcogens ← → noble gases
IUPAC group number	17
Name by element	fluorine group
Trivial name	halogens
CAS group number (US, pattern A-B-A)	VIIA
old IUPAC number (Europe, pattern A-B)	VIIB

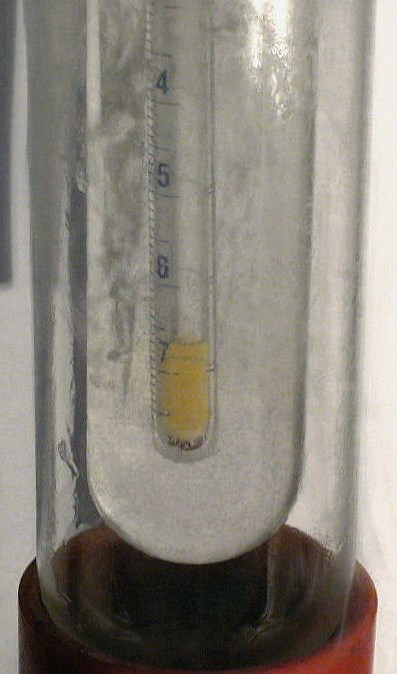
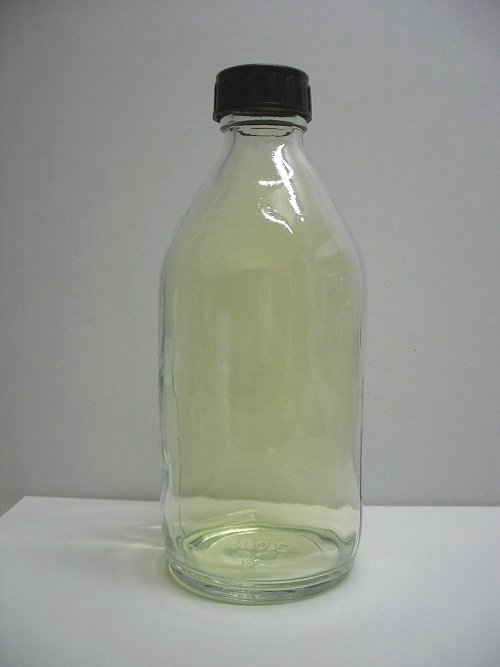
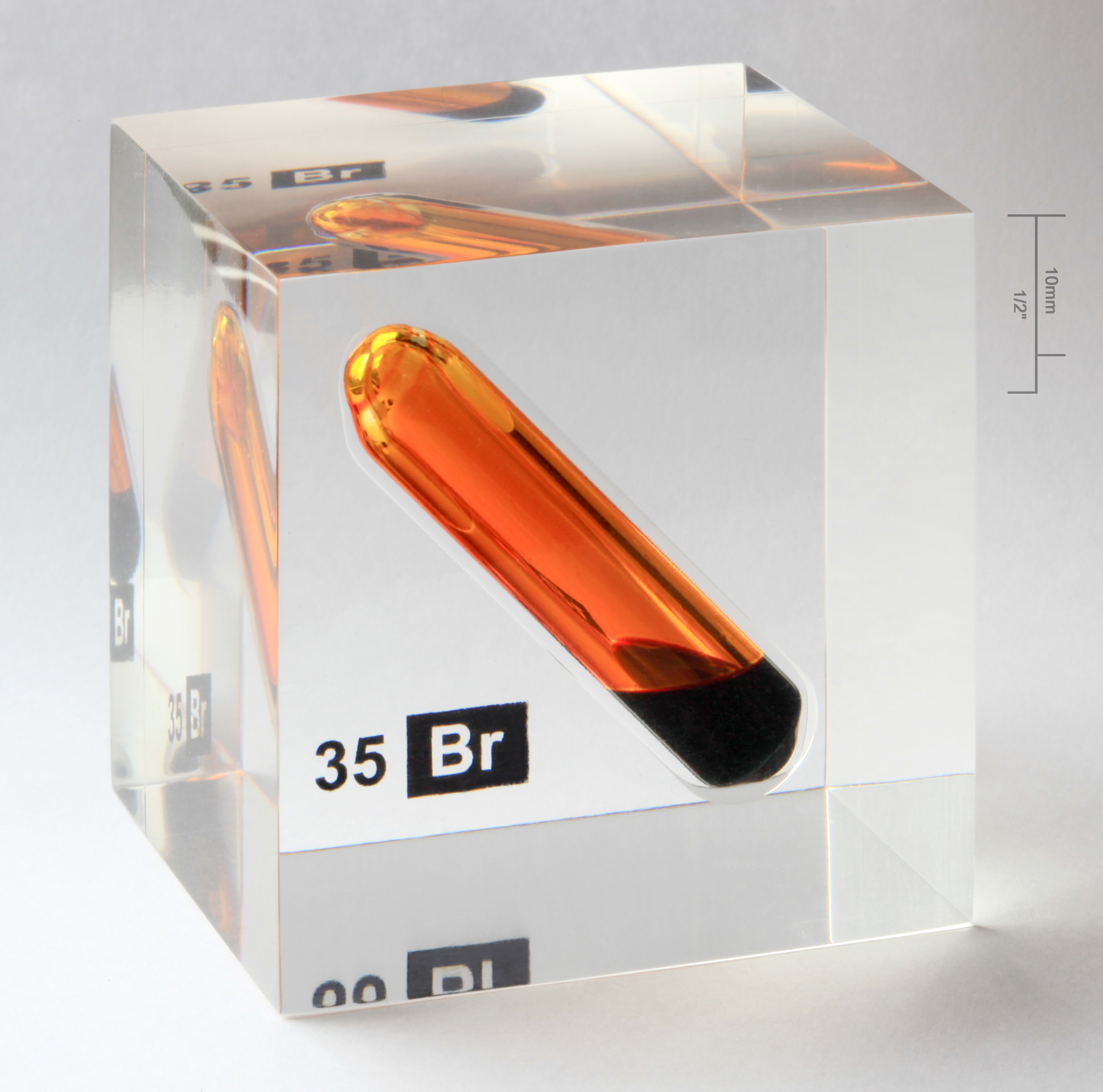
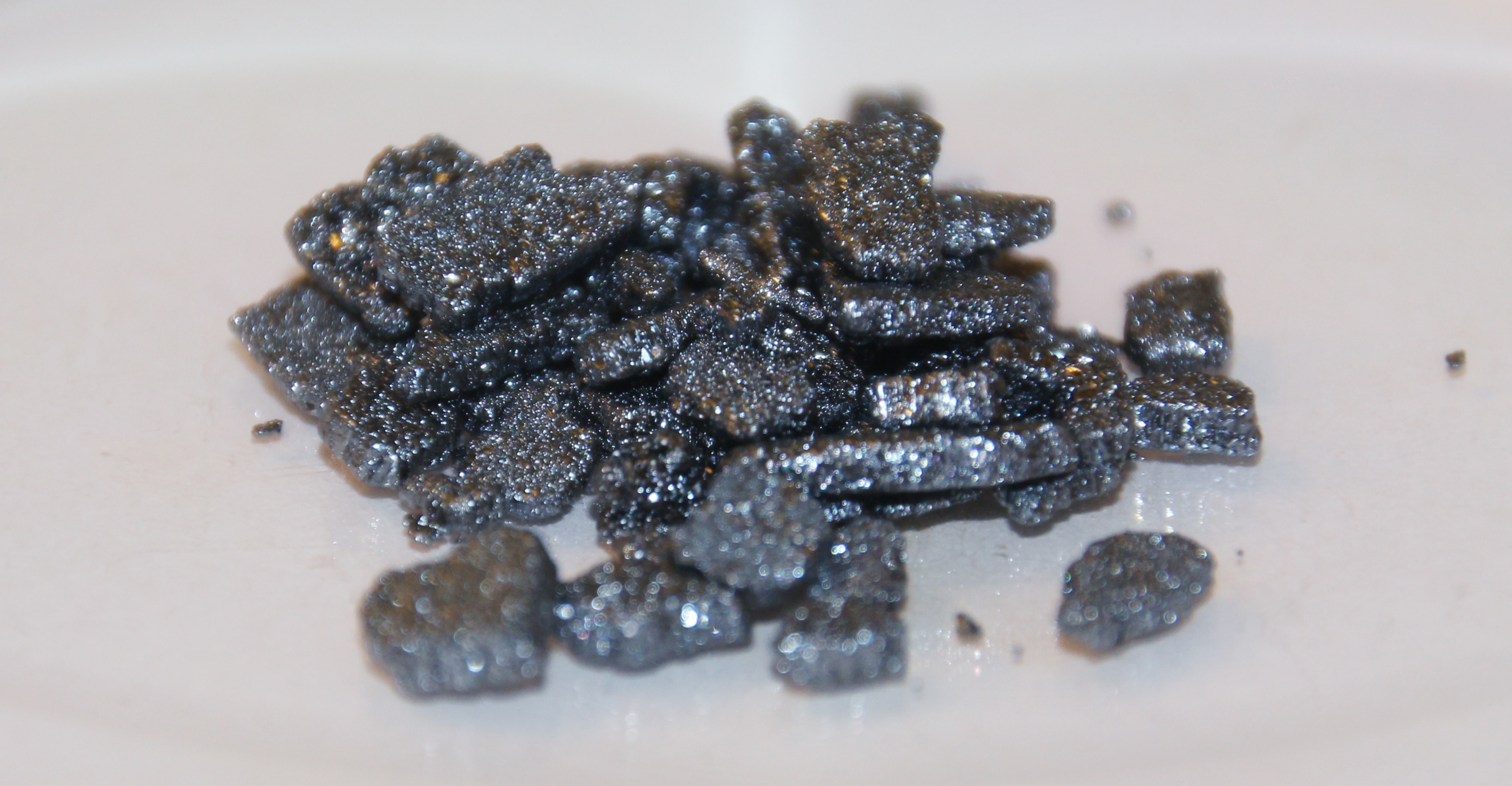
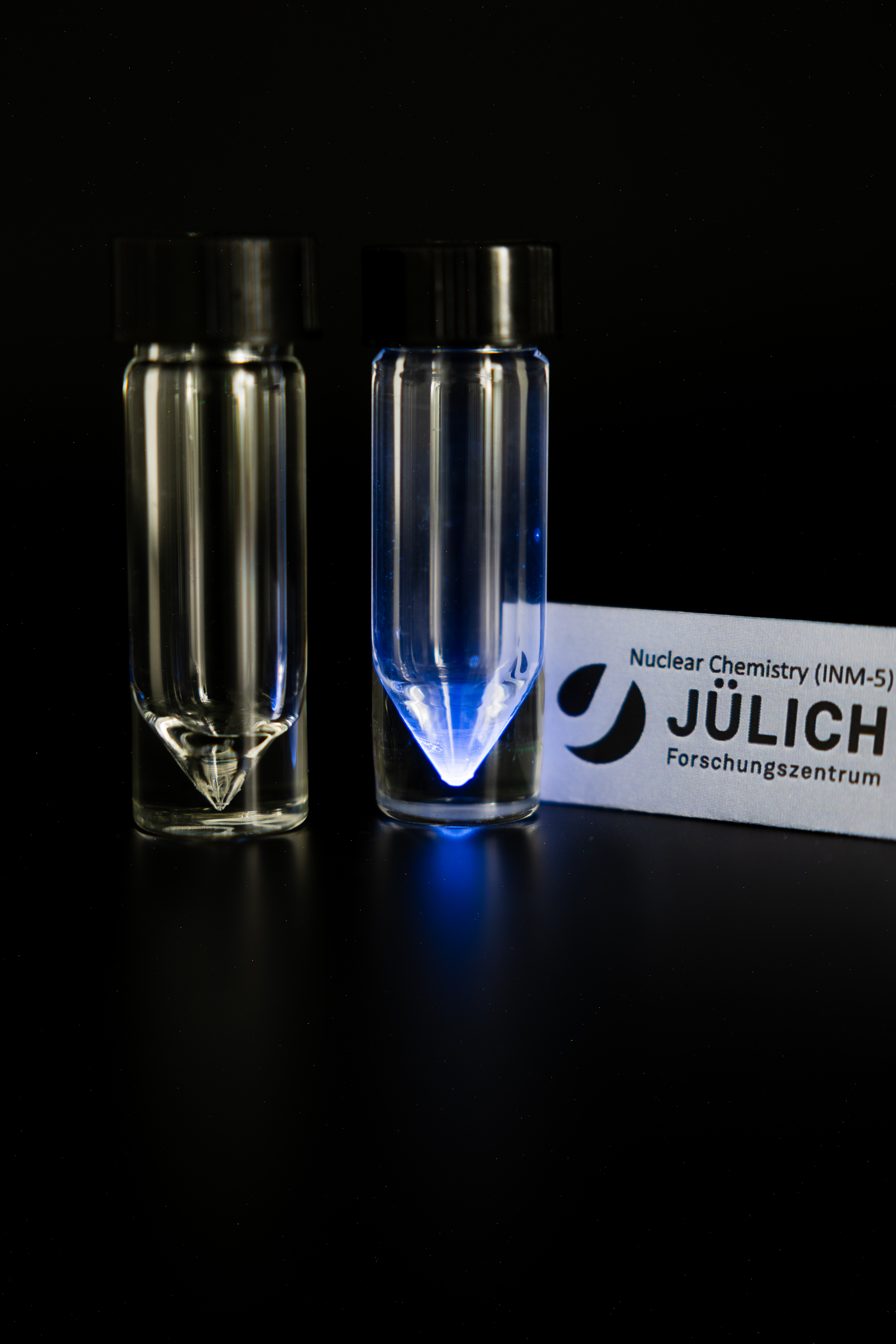
↓ Period
2	Fluorine (F); 9 Halogen
3	Chlorine (Cl); 17 Halogen
4	Bromine (Br); 35 Halogen
5	Iodine (I); 53 Halogen
6	Astatine (At); 85 Halogen
7	Tennessine (Ts); 117 Halogen
Legend primordial element element from decay Synthetic

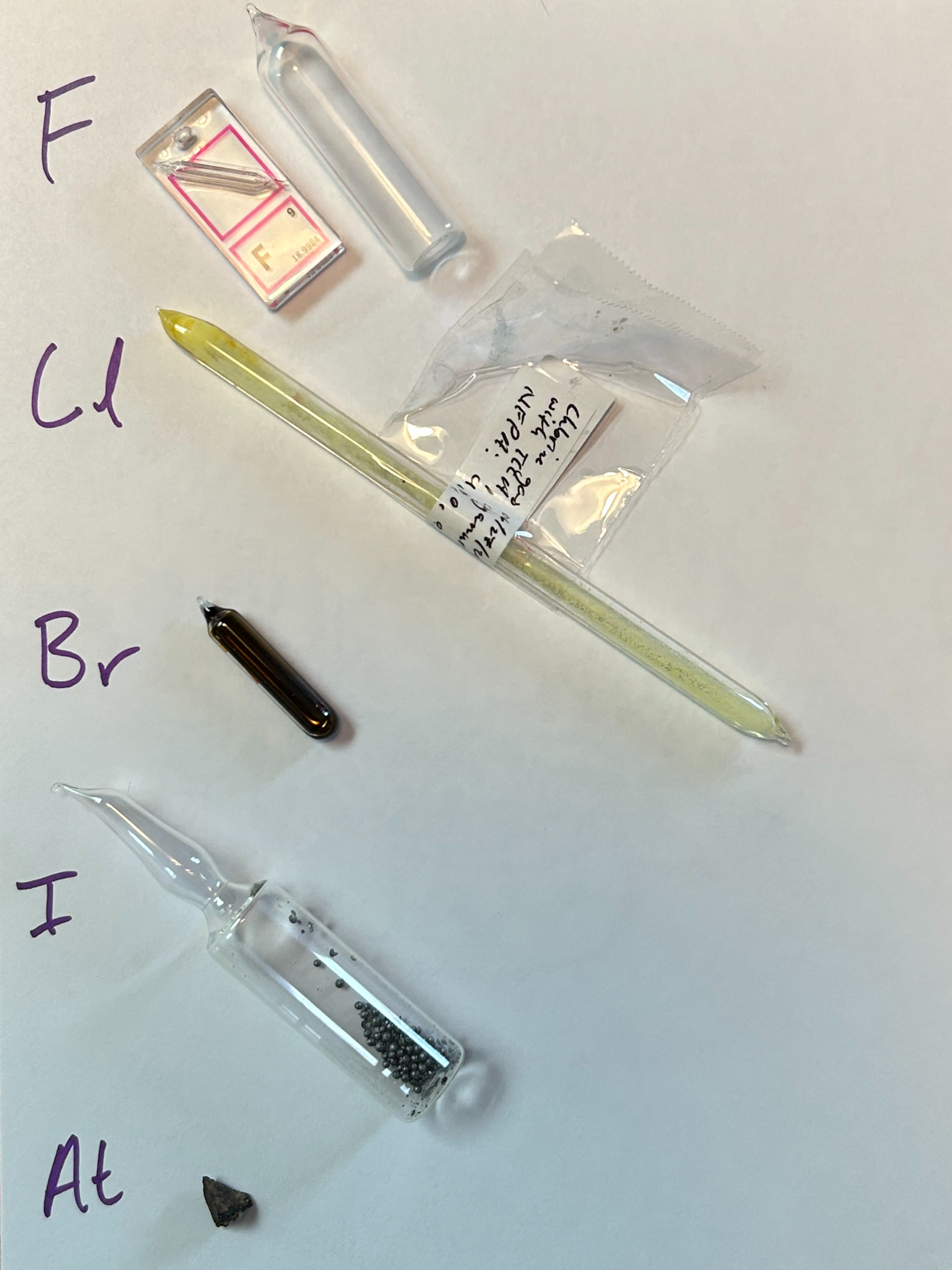
Astatine is here represented by Uraninite (uranium ore mostly composed of uranium dioxide (UO_{2}), which contains ^{238}U, which then decays into astatine among other things). Chlorine and iodine samples were prepared in the lab, while all other samples were obtained commercially from online sellers (e.g. Luciteria, NovaElements, etc...). The large fluorine ampoule is 30% fluorine 70% helium, and both fluorine ampoules are rarefied.

The halogens are a group in the periodic table consisting of six chemically related elements, fluorine (F), chlorine (Cl), bromine (Br), iodine (I), and the radioactive elements astatine (At) and tennessine (Ts), though some authors would exclude tennessine as its chemistry is unknown and is theoretically expected to be more like that of gallium. In the modern IUPAC nomenclature, this group is known as group 17.

The word "halogen" means "salt former" or "salt maker". When halogens react with metals, they produce a wide range of salts, including calcium fluoride, sodium chloride (common table salt), silver bromide, and potassium iodide.

The group of halogens is the only periodic table group that contains elements in three of the main states of matter at standard temperature and pressure, though not far above room temperature the same becomes true of groups 1 and 15, assuming white phosphorus is taken as the standard state. (Note: This could also be the case for group 12, although copernicium's melting and boiling points are still uncertain.) All of the halogens form acids when bonded to hydrogen. Most halogens are typically produced from minerals or salts. The middle halogens—chlorine, bromine, and iodine—are often used as disinfectants. Organobromides are the most important class of flame retardants, while elemental halogens are dangerous and can be toxic.

== History ==
The fluorine mineral fluorspar was known as early as 1529. Early chemists realized that fluorine compounds contain an undiscovered element, but were unable to isolate it. In 1869, George Gore, an English chemist, ran a current of electricity through hydrofluoric acid and probably produced fluorine, but he was unable to prove his results at the time. In 1886, Henri Moissan, a chemist in Paris, performed electrolysis on potassium bifluoride dissolved in anhydrous hydrogen fluoride, and successfully isolated fluorine.

Hydrochloric acid was known to alchemists and early chemists. However, elemental chlorine was not produced until 1774, when Carl Wilhelm Scheele heated hydrochloric acid with manganese dioxide. Scheele called the element "dephlogisticated muriatic acid", which is how chlorine was known for 33 years. In 1807, Humphry Davy investigated chlorine and discovered that it is an actual element. Chlorine gas was used as a poisonous gas during World War I. It displaced oxygen in contaminated areas and replaced common oxygenated air with the toxic chlorine gas. The gas would burn human tissue externally and internally, especially the lungs, making breathing difficult or impossible depending on the level of contamination.

Bromine was discovered in the 1820s by Antoine Jérôme Balard. Balard discovered bromine by passing chlorine gas through a sample of brine. He originally proposed the name muride for the new element, but the French Academy changed the element's name to bromine.

Iodine was discovered by Bernard Courtois, who was using seaweed ash as part of a process for saltpeter manufacture. Courtois typically boiled the seaweed ash with water to generate potassium chloride. However, in 1811, Courtois added sulfuric acid to his process and found that his process produced purple fumes that condensed into black crystals. Suspecting that these crystals were a new element, Courtois sent samples to other chemists for investigation. Iodine was proven to be a new element by Joseph Gay-Lussac.

In 1931, Fred Allison claimed to have discovered element 85 with a magneto-optical machine, and named the element Alabamine, but was mistaken. In 1937, Rajendralal De claimed to have discovered element 85 in minerals, and called the element dakine, but he was also mistaken. An attempt at discovering element 85 in 1939 by Horia Hulubei and Yvette Cauchois via spectroscopy was also unsuccessful, as was an attempt in the same year by Walter Minder, who discovered an iodine-like element resulting from beta decay of polonium. Element 85, now named astatine, was produced successfully in 1940 by Dale R. Corson, K.R. Mackenzie, and Emilio G. Segrè, who bombarded bismuth with alpha particles.

In 2010, a team led by nuclear physicist Yuri Oganessian involving scientists from the JINR, Oak Ridge National Laboratory, Lawrence Livermore National Laboratory, and Vanderbilt University successfully bombarded berkelium-249 atoms with calcium-48 atoms to make tennessine.

== Etymology ==
In 1811, the German chemist Johann Schweigger proposed that the name "halogen" – meaning "salt producer", from αλς [hals] "salt" and γενειν [genein] "to beget" – replace the name "chlorine", which had been proposed by the English chemist Humphry Davy. Davy's name for the element prevailed. However, in 1826, the Swedish chemist Baron Jöns Jacob Berzelius proposed the term "halogen" for the elements fluorine, chlorine, and iodine, which produce a sea-salt-like substance when they form a compound with an alkaline metal.

The English names of these elements all have the ending -ine. Fluorine's name comes from the Latin word fluere, meaning "to flow", because it was derived from the mineral fluorite, which was used as a flux in metalworking. Chlorine's name comes from the Greek word chloros, meaning "greenish-yellow". Bromine's name comes from the Greek word bromos, meaning "stench". Iodine's name comes from the Greek word iodes, meaning "violet". Astatine's name comes from the Greek word astatos, meaning "unstable". Tennessine is named after the US state of Tennessee, where it was synthesized.

== Characteristics ==
=== Chemical ===
The halogens fluorine, chlorine, bromine, and iodine are nonmetals; the chemical properties of astatine and tennessine, two heaviest group 17 members, have not been conclusively investigated. The halogens show trends in chemical bond energy moving from top to bottom of the periodic table column with fluorine deviating slightly. It follows a trend in having the highest bond energy in compounds with other atoms, but it has very weak bonds within the diatomic F_{2} molecule. This means that further down group 17 in the periodic table, the reactivity of elements decreases because of the increasing size of the atoms.

Halogen bond energies (kJ/mol)
X	X_{2}	HX	BX_{3}	AlX_{3}	CX_{4}
F	159	574	645	582	456
Cl	243	428	444	427	327
Br	193	363	368	360	272
I	151	294	272	285	239

Halogens are highly reactive, and as such can be harmful or lethal to biological organisms in sufficient quantities. This high reactivity is due to the high electronegativity of the atoms due to their high effective nuclear charge. Because the halogens have seven valence electrons in their outermost energy level, they can gain an electron by reacting with atoms of other elements to satisfy the octet rule. Fluorine is the most reactive of all elements; it is the only element more electronegative than oxygen, it attacks otherwise-inert materials such as glass, and it forms compounds with the usually inert noble gases. It is a corrosive and highly toxic gas. The reactivity of fluorine is such that, if used or stored in laboratory glassware, it can react with glass in the presence of small amounts of water to form silicon tetrafluoride (SiF_{4}). Thus, fluorine must be handled with substances such as Teflon (which is itself an organofluorine compound), extremely dry glass, or metals such as copper or steel, which form a protective layer of fluoride on their surface.

The high reactivity of fluorine allows some of the strongest bonds possible, especially to carbon. For example, Teflon is fluorine bonded with carbon and is extremely resistant to thermal and chemical attacks and has a high melting point.

==== Molecules ====
===== Diatomic halogen molecules =====
The stable halogens form homonuclear diatomic molecules. Due to relatively weak intermolecular forces, chlorine and fluorine form part of the group known as "elemental gases".

halogen	molecule	structure	model	d(X−X) / pm (gas phase)	d(X−X) / pm (solid phase)
fluorine	F_{2}			143	149
chlorine	Cl_{2}			199	198
bromine	Br_{2}			228	227
iodine	I_{2}			266	272

The elements become less reactive and have higher melting points as the atomic number increases. The higher melting points are caused by stronger London dispersion forces resulting from more electrons.

==== Compounds ====
===== Hydrogen halides =====
All of the halogens have been observed to react with hydrogen to form hydrogen halides. For fluorine, chlorine, and bromine, this reaction is in the form of:

H_{2} + X_{2} → 2HX

However, hydrogen iodide and hydrogen astatide can split back into their constituent elements.

The hydrogen-halogen reactions get gradually less reactive toward the heavier halogens. A fluorine-hydrogen reaction is explosive even when it is dark and cold. A chlorine-hydrogen reaction is also explosive, but only in the presence of light and heat. A bromine-hydrogen reaction is even less explosive; it is explosive only when exposed to flames. Iodine and astatine only partially react with hydrogen, forming equilibria.

All halogens form binary compounds with hydrogen known as the hydrogen halides: hydrogen fluoride (HF), hydrogen chloride (HCl), hydrogen bromide (HBr), hydrogen iodide (HI), and hydrogen astatide (HAt). All of these compounds form acids when mixed with water. Hydrogen fluoride is the only hydrogen halide that forms hydrogen bonds. Hydrochloric acid, hydrobromic acid, hydroiodic acid, and hydroastatic acid are all strong acids, but hydrofluoric acid is a weak acid.

All of the hydrogen halides are irritants. Hydrogen fluoride and hydrogen chloride are highly acidic. Hydrogen fluoride is used as an industrial chemical, and is highly toxic, causing pulmonary edema and damaging cells. Hydrogen chloride is also a dangerous chemical. Breathing in gas with more than fifty parts per million of hydrogen chloride can cause death in humans. Hydrogen bromide is even more toxic and irritating than hydrogen chloride. Breathing in gas with more than thirty parts per million of hydrogen bromide can be lethal to humans. Hydrogen iodide, like other hydrogen halides, is toxic.

===== Metal halides =====
All the halogens are known to react with sodium to form sodium fluoride, sodium chloride, sodium bromide, sodium iodide, and sodium astatide. Heated sodium's reaction with halogens produces bright-orange flames. Sodium's reaction with chlorine is in the form of:

2Na + Cl_{2} → 2NaCl

Iron reacts with fluorine, chlorine, and bromine to form iron(III) halides. These reactions are in the form of:

2Fe + 3X_{2} → 2FeX_{3}

However, when iron reacts with iodine, it forms only iron(II) iodide.

Fe + I_{2} → FeI_{2}

Iron wool can react rapidly with fluorine to form the white compound iron(III) fluoride even in cold temperatures. When chlorine comes into contact with a heated iron, they react to form the black iron(III) chloride. However, if the reaction conditions are moist, this reaction will instead result in a reddish-brown product. Iron can also react with bromine to form iron(III) bromide. This compound is reddish-brown in dry conditions. Iron's reaction with bromine is less reactive than its reaction with fluorine or chlorine. A hot iron can also react with iodine, but it forms iron(II) iodide. This compound may be gray, but the reaction is always contaminated with excess iodine, so it is not known for sure. Iron's reaction with iodine is less vigorous than its reaction with the lighter halogens.

===== Interhalogen compounds =====
Interhalogen compounds are in the form of XY_{n} where X and Y are halogens and n is one, three, five, or seven. Interhalogen compounds contain at most two different halogens. Large interhalogens, such as ClF_{3} can be produced by a reaction of a pure halogen with a smaller interhalogen such as ClF. All interhalogens except IF_{7} can be produced by directly combining pure halogens in various conditions.

Interhalogens are typically more reactive than all diatomic halogen molecules except F_{2} because interhalogen bonds are weaker. However, the chemical properties of interhalogens are still roughly the same as those of diatomic halogens. Many interhalogens consist of one or more atoms of fluorine bonding to a heavier halogen. Chlorine and bromine can bond with up to five fluorine atoms, and iodine can bond with up to seven fluorine atoms. Most interhalogen compounds are covalent gases. However, some interhalogens are liquids, such as BrF_{3}, and many iodine-containing interhalogens are solids.

===== Organohalogen compounds =====
Many synthetic organic compounds such as plastic polymers, and a few natural ones, contain halogen atoms; these are known as halogenated compounds or organic halides. Chlorine is by far the most abundant of the halogens in seawater, and the only one needed in relatively large amounts (as chloride ions) by humans. For example, chloride ions play a key role in brain function by mediating the action of the inhibitory transmitter GABA and are also used by the body to produce stomach acid. Iodine is needed in trace amounts for the production of thyroid hormones such as thyroxine. Organohalogens are also synthesized through the nucleophilic abstraction reaction.

===== Polyhalogenated compounds =====
Polyhalogenated compounds are industrially created compounds substituted with multiple halogens. Many of them are very toxic and bioaccumulate in humans, and have a very wide application range. They include PCBs, PBDEs, and perfluorinated compounds (PFCs), as well as numerous other compounds.

==== Reactions ====
===== Reactions with water =====
Fluorine reacts vigorously with water to produce oxygen (O_{2}) and hydrogen fluoride (HF):

2 F_{2}(g) + 2 H_{2}O(l) → O_{2}(g) + 4 HF(aq)

Chlorine has maximum solubility of ca. 7.1 g Cl_{2} per kg of water at ambient temperature (21 °C). Dissolved chlorine reacts to form hydrochloric acid (HCl) and hypochlorous acid, a solution that can be used as a disinfectant or bleach:

Cl_{2}(g) + H_{2}O(l) → HCl(aq) + HClO(aq)

Bromine has a solubility of 3.41 g per 100 g of water, but it slowly reacts to form hydrogen bromide (HBr) and hypobromous acid (HBrO):

Br_{2}(g) + H_{2}O(l) → HBr(aq) + HBrO(aq)

Iodine, however, is minimally soluble in water (0.03 g/100 g water at 20 °C) and does not react with it. However, iodine will form an aqueous solution in the presence of iodide ion, such as by addition of potassium iodide (KI), because the triiodide ion is formed.

=== Physical and atomic ===
The table below is a summary of the key physical and atomic properties of the halogens. Data marked with question marks are either uncertain or are estimations partially based on periodic trends rather than observations.

Halogen	Standard atomic weight (Da) (Note: The number given in parentheses refers to the measurement uncertainty. This uncertainty applies to the least significant figure(s) of the number prior to the parenthesized value (i.e., counting from rightmost digit to left). For instance, 1.00794(7) stands for 1.00794±0.00007, while 1.00794(72) stands for 1.00794±0.00072.)	Melting point (K)	Melting point (°C)	Boiling point (K)	Boiling point (°C)	Density (g/cm^{3} at 25 °C)	Electronegativity (Pauling)	First ionization energy (kJ·mol^{−1})	Covalent radius (pm)
Fluorine	18.9984032(5)	53.53	−219.62	85.03	−188.12	0.0017	3.98	1681.0	71
Chlorine	[35.446; 35.457] (Note: The average atomic weight of this element changes depending on the source of the chlorine, and the values in brackets are the upper and lower bounds.)	171.6	−101.5	239.11	−34.04	0.0032	3.16	1251.2	99
Bromine	79.904(1)	265.8	−7.3	332.0	58.8	3.1028	2.96	1139.9	114
Iodine	126.90447(3)	386.85	113.7	457.4	184.3	4.933	2.66	1008.4	133
Astatine	[210] (Note: The element does not have any stable nuclides, and the value in brackets indicates the mass number of the longest-lived isotope of the element.)	575	302	? 610	? 337	? 6.2–6.5	2.2	899.0	? 145
Tennessine	[294]	? 623-823	? 350-550	? 883	? 610	? 7.1-7.3	-	? 743	? 157

Z	Element	Electrons per shell
9	fluorine	2, 7
17	chlorine	2, 8, 7
35	bromine	2, 8, 18, 7
53	iodine	2, 8, 18, 18, 7
85	astatine	2, 8, 18, 32, 18, 7
117	tennessine	2, 8, 18, 32, 32, 18, 7 (predicted)

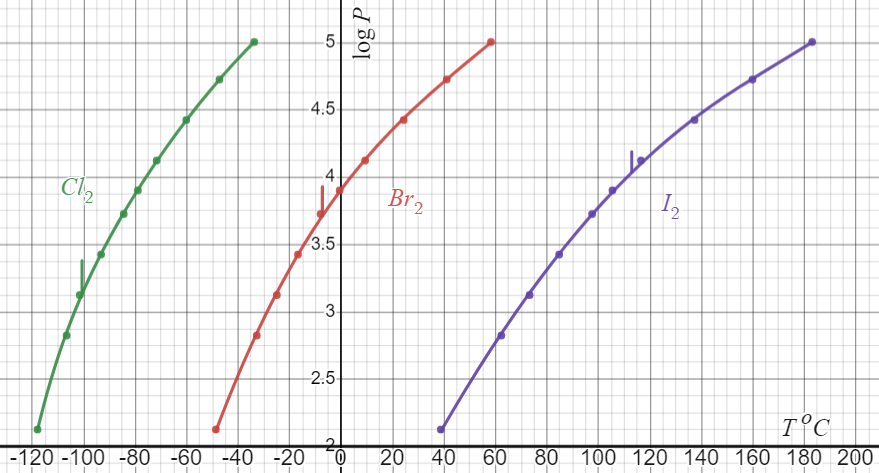
Boiling or sublimation temperature dependence for halogens at various pressures. The vertical bar indicates the melting point

Sublimation or boiling point (°C) of halogens at various pressures
Tmelt (^{о}С)		−100.7	−7.3	112.9
log(P[Pa])	mmHg	Cl_{2}	Br_{2}	I_{2}
2.12490302	1	−118	−48.7	38.7
2.82387302	5	−106.7	−32.8	62.2
3.12490302	10	−101.6	−25	73.2
3.42593302	20	−93.3	−16.8	84.7
3.72696301	40	−84.5	−8	97.5
3.90305427	60	−79	−0.6	105.4
4.12490302	100	−71.7	9.3	116.5
4.42593302	200	−60.2	24.3	137.3
4.72696301	400	−47.3	41	159.8
5.00571661	760	−33.8	58.2	183
log(P[Pa])	atm	Cl_{2}	Br_{2}	I_{2}
5.00571661	1	−33.8	58.2	183
5.30674661	2	−16.9	78.8	
5.70468662	5	10.3	110.3	
6.00571661	10	35.6	139.8	
6.30674661	20	65	174	
6.48283787	30	84.8	197	
6.6077766	40	101.6	215	
6.70468662	50	115.2	230	
6.78386786	60	127.1	243.5	

==== Isotopes ====
Fluorine has one stable and naturally occurring isotope, fluorine-19. However, there are trace amounts in nature of the radioactive isotope fluorine-23, which occurs via cluster decay of protactinium-231. A total of eighteen isotopes of fluorine have been discovered, with atomic masses ranging from 13 to 31.

Chlorine has two stable and naturally occurring isotopes, chlorine-35 and chlorine-37. However, there are trace amounts in nature of the isotope chlorine-36, which occurs via spallation of argon-36. A total of 24 isotopes of chlorine have been discovered, with atomic masses raging from 28 to 51.

There are two stable and naturally occurring isotopes of bromine, bromine-79 and bromine-81. A total of 33 isotopes of bromine have been discovered, with atomic masses ranging from 66 to 98.

There is one stable and naturally occurring isotope of iodine, iodine-127. However, there are trace amounts in nature of the radioactive isotope iodine-129, which occurs via spallation and from the radioactive decay of uranium in ores. Several other radioactive isotopes of iodine have also been created naturally via the decay of uranium. A total of 38 isotopes of iodine have been discovered, with atomic masses ranging from 108 to 145.

There are no stable isotopes of astatine. However, there are four naturally occurring radioactive isotopes of astatine produced via radioactive decay of uranium, neptunium, and plutonium. These isotopes are astatine-215, astatine-217, astatine-218, and astatine-219. A total of 31 isotopes of astatine have been discovered, with atomic masses ranging from 191 to 227.

There are no stable isotopes of tennessine. Tennessine has only two known synthetic radioisotopes, tennessine-293 and tennessine-294.

== Production ==
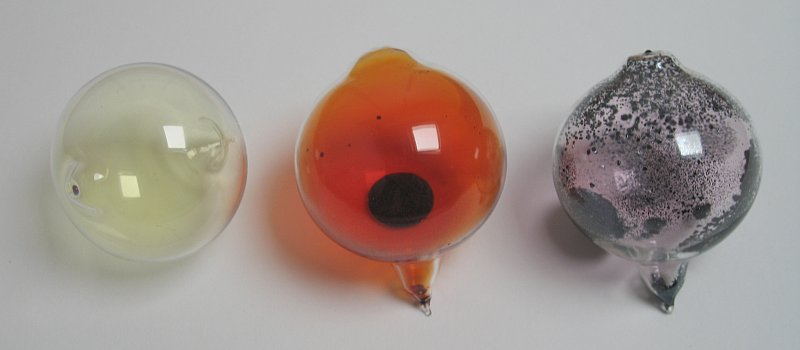
From left to right: chlorine, bromine, and iodine at room temperature. Chlorine is a gas, bromine is a liquid, and iodine is a solid. Fluorine could not be included in the image due to its high reactivity, and astatine and tennessine due to their radioactivity.

Approximately six million metric tons of the fluorine mineral fluorite are produced each year. Four hundred-thousand metric tons of hydrofluoric acid are made each year. Fluorine gas is made from hydrofluoric acid produced as a by-product in phosphoric acid manufacture. Approximately 15,000 metric tons of fluorine gas are made per year.

The mineral halite is the mineral that is most commonly mined for chlorine, but the minerals carnallite and sylvite are also mined for chlorine. Forty million metric tons of chlorine are produced each year by the electrolysis of brine.

Approximately 450,000 metric tons of bromine are produced each year. Fifty percent of all bromine produced is produced in the United States, 35% in Israel, and most of the remainder in China. Historically, bromine was produced by adding sulfuric acid and bleaching powder to natural brine. However, in modern times, bromine is produced by electrolysis, a method invented by Herbert Dow. It is also possible to produce bromine by passing chlorine through seawater and then passing air through the seawater.

In 2003, 22,000 metric tons of iodine were produced. Chile produces 40% of all iodine produced, Japan produces 30%, and smaller amounts are produced in Russia and the United States. Until the 1950s, iodine was extracted from kelp. However, in modern times, iodine is produced in other ways. One way that iodine is produced is by mixing sulfur dioxide with nitrate ores, which contain some iodates. Iodine is also extracted from natural gas fields.

Even though astatine is naturally occurring, it is usually produced by bombarding bismuth with alpha particles.

Tennessine is made by using a cyclotron, fusing berkelium-249 and calcium-48 to make tennessine-293 and tennessine-294.

== Applications ==
=== Disinfectants ===
Both chlorine and bromine are used as disinfectants for drinking water, swimming pools, fresh wounds, spas, dishes, and surfaces. Tincture of iodine is also used to treated wounds. They kill bacteria and other potentially harmful microorganisms through a process known as sterilization. Their reactivity is also put to use in bleaching. Sodium hypochlorite, which is produced from chlorine, is the active ingredient of most fabric bleaches, and chlorine-derived bleaches are used in the production of some paper products.

=== Lighting ===
Halogen lamps are a type of incandescent lamp using a tungsten filament in bulbs that have small amounts of a halogen, such as iodine or bromine added. This enables the production of lamps that are much smaller than non-halogen incandescent lightbulbs at the same wattage. The gas reduces the thinning of the filament and blackening of the inside of the bulb resulting in a bulb that has a much greater life. Halogen lamps glow at a higher temperature (2800 to 3400 kelvin) with a whiter colour than other incandescent bulbs. However, this requires bulbs to be manufactured from fused quartz rather than silica glass to reduce breakage.

=== Drug components ===
In drug discovery, the incorporation of halogen atoms into a lead drug candidate results in analogues that are usually more lipophilic and less water-soluble. As a consequence, halogen atoms are used to improve penetration through lipid membranes and tissues. It follows that there is a tendency for some halogenated drugs to accumulate in adipose tissue. Radioactive iodine therapy can be used to treat hyperthyroidism and some thyroid cancers.

The chemical reactivity of halogen atoms depends on both their point of attachment to the lead and the nature of the halogen. Aromatic halogen groups are far less reactive than aliphatic halogen groups, which can exhibit considerable chemical reactivity. For aliphatic carbon-halogen bonds, the C-F bond is the strongest and usually less chemically reactive than aliphatic C-H bonds. The other aliphatic-halogen bonds are weaker, their reactivity increasing down the periodic table. They are usually more chemically reactive than aliphatic C-H bonds. As a consequence, the most common halogen substitutions are the less reactive aromatic fluorine and chlorine groups.

== Biological role ==
Fluoride anions are found in ivory, bones, teeth, blood, eggs, urine, and hair of organisms. Fluoride anions in very small amounts may be essential for humans. There are 0.5 milligrams of fluorine per liter of human blood. Human bones contain 0.2 to 1.2% fluorine. Human tissue contains approximately 50 parts per billion of fluorine. A typical 70-kilogram human contains 3 to 6 grams of fluorine.

Chloride anions are essential to a large number of species, humans included. The concentration of chlorine in the dry weight of cereals is 10 to 20 parts per million, while in potatoes the concentration of chloride is 0.5%. Plant growth is adversely affected by chloride levels in the soil falling below 2 parts per million. Human blood contains an average of 0.3% chlorine. Human bone typically contains 900 parts per million of chlorine. Human tissue contains approximately 0.2 to 0.5% chlorine. There is a total of 95 grams of chlorine in a typical 70-kilogram human.

Some bromine in the form of the bromide anion is present in all organisms. A biological role for bromine in humans has not been proven, but some organisms contain organobromine compounds. Humans typically consume 1 to 20 milligrams of bromine per day. There are typically 5 parts per million of bromine in human blood, 7 parts per million of bromine in human bones, and 7 parts per million of bromine in human tissue. A typical 70-kilogram human contains 260 milligrams of bromine.

Humans typically consume less than 100 micrograms of iodine per day. Iodine deficiency can cause intellectual disability. Organoiodine compounds occur in humans in some of the glands, especially the thyroid gland, as well as the stomach, epidermis, and immune system. Foods containing iodine include cod, oysters, shrimp, herring, lobsters, sunflower seeds, seaweed, and mushrooms. However, iodine is not known to have a biological role in plants. There are typically 0.06 milligrams per liter of iodine in human blood, 300 parts per billion of iodine in human bones, and 50 to 700 parts per billion of iodine in human tissue. There are 10 to 20 milligrams of iodine in a typical 70-kilogram human.

Astatine, although very scarce, has been found in micrograms in the earth. It has no known biological role because of its high radioactivity, extreme rarity, and has a half-life of just about 8 hours for the most stable isotope.

Tennessine is purely man-made and has no other roles in nature.

== Toxicity ==
The halogens tend to decrease in toxicity towards the heavier halogens.

Fluorine gas is extremely toxic; breathing in fluorine at a concentration of 25 parts per million is potentially lethal. Hydrofluoric acid is also toxic, being able to penetrate skin and cause highly painful burns. In addition, fluoride anions are toxic, but not as toxic as pure fluorine. Fluoride can be lethal in amounts of 5 to 10 grams. Prolonged consumption of fluoride above concentrations of 1.5 mg/L is associated with a risk of dental fluorosis, an aesthetic condition of the teeth. At concentrations above 4 mg/L, there is an increased risk of developing skeletal fluorosis, a condition in which bone fractures become more common due to the hardening of bones. Current recommended levels in water fluoridation, a way to prevent dental caries, range from 0.7 to 1.2 mg/L to avoid the detrimental effects of fluoride while at the same time reaping the benefits. People with levels between normal levels and those required for skeletal fluorosis tend to have symptoms similar to arthritis.

Chlorine gas is highly toxic. Breathing in chlorine at a concentration of 3 parts per million can rapidly cause a toxic reaction. Breathing in chlorine at a concentration of 50 parts per million is highly dangerous. Breathing in chlorine at a concentration of 500 parts per million for a few minutes is lethal. In addition, breathing in chlorine gas is highly painful because of its corrosive properties. Hydrochloric acid is the acid of chlorine, while relatively nontoxic, it is highly corrosive and releases very irritating and toxic hydrogen chloride gas in open air.

Pure bromine is somewhat toxic but less toxic than fluorine and chlorine. One hundred milligrams of bromine is lethal. Bromide anions are also toxic, but less so than bromine. Bromide has a lethal dose of 30 grams.

Iodine is somewhat toxic, being able to irritate the lungs and eyes, with a safety limit of 1 milligram per cubic meter. When taken orally, 3 grams of iodine can be lethal. Iodide anions are mostly nontoxic, but these can also be deadly if ingested in large amounts.

Astatine is radioactive and thus highly dangerous, but it has not been produced in macroscopic quantities and hence it is most unlikely that its toxicity will be of much relevance to the average individual.

Tennessine cannot be chemically investigated due to how short its half-life is, although its radioactivity would make it very dangerous.

== Superhalogen ==
Superhalogens are atom clusters with a higher electron affinity than chlorine, the atom with the highest electron affinity (3.62 eV). The concept was first formalized by Gennady L. Gutsev and Alexander I. Boldyrev in 1981.

Certain aluminium clusters have superatom properties. These aluminium clusters are generated as anions (Al^{−}_{n} with n = 1, 2, 3, ... ) in helium gas and reacted with a gas containing iodine. When analyzed by mass spectrometry one main reaction product turns out to be Al_{13}I^{−}. These clusters of 13 aluminium atoms with an extra electron added do not appear to react with oxygen when it is introduced in the same gas stream. Assuming each atom liberates its 3 valence electrons, this means 40 electrons are present, which is one of the magic numbers for sodium and implies that these numbers are a reflection of the noble gases.

Calculations show that the additional electron is located in the aluminium cluster at the location directly opposite from the iodine atom. The cluster must therefore have a higher electron affinity for the electron than iodine and therefore the aluminium cluster is called a superhalogen (i.e., the vertical electron detachment energies of the moieties that make up the negative ions are larger than those of any halogen atom). The cluster component in the Al_{13}I^{−} ion is similar to an iodide ion or a bromide ion. The related Al_{13}I^{−}_{2} cluster is expected to behave chemically like the triiodide ion.

== See also ==
- Halogen bond
- Halogen addition reaction
- Halogen lamp
- Halogenation
- Interhalogen
- Pseudohalogen

== Bibliography ==
- Greenwood, Norman N.; Earnshaw, Alan (1997). Chemistry of the Elements (2nd ed.). Butterworth-Heinemann. doi:10.1016/C2009-0-30414-6. ISBN 978-0-08-037941-8.
