= Tango Company =

Tango Company Tango連 / T大隊

Jurisdictional structure
- Operations jurisdiction: Hong Kong
- Governing body: Hong Kong Police Force

Chinese name
- Traditional Chinese: Tango連
- Simplified Chinese: Tango连
Transcriptions
Standard Mandarin
- Hanyu Pinyin: Tango Lián
Yue: Cantonese
- Jyutping: Tango Lin4

T大隊
- Traditional Chinese: T大隊
- Simplified Chinese: T大队
Transcriptions
Standard Mandarin
- Hanyu Pinyin: T Dàduì
Yue: Cantonese
- Jyutping: T Daai6deoi6

Tango Company is a female riot police company under the Hong Kong Police Force. It's tasked on crowd control during public activities.

== History ==
Founded in June 1992, It was initially established to relieve women and children in the Vietnamese refugee camps.

=== Known Operations ===
During and after the Vietnam War, Tango Company assisted to deport 143,700 Vietnamese refugees entered into Hong Kong.

== Organisation ==
TC officers can be mobilized by district commanders.
