= DeconGel =

Nuclear and chemical cleaning solution

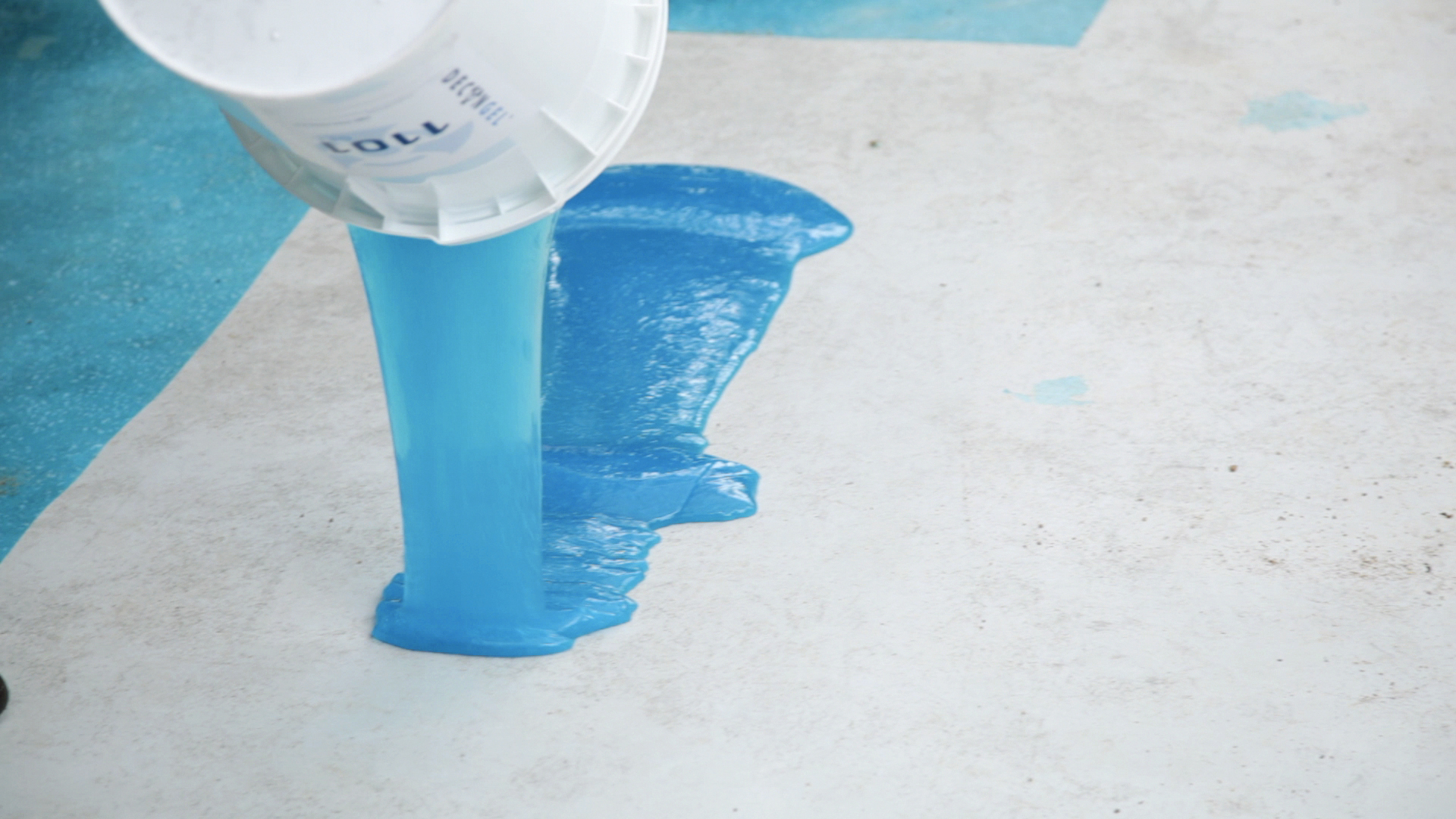
- DeconGel (Formula 1101) being poured on a surface
- Product type: Decontaminant
- Current owner: CBI Polymers
- Country: Honolulu, Hawaii, United States
- Introduced: September 23, 2011; 15 years ago
- Website: www.decongel.com

DeconGel is a gel created by CBI Polymers INC used to clean up after chemical and nuclear disasters. The product has been tested by numerous agencies and organizations in Japan including first responders, nuclear power plant operators, and private companies.

== History ==
DeconGel was created by CBI Polymers INC in Honolulu, Hawaii, in June 2011. Since then it has been used commercially to clean up chemicals and nuclear waste. Most notably being in Japan after the Fukushima nuclear disaster after the March 11, 2011 earthquake and subsequent tsunami compromised reactors and cooling baths at TEPCO’s Daiichi Nuclear Power Station left high levels of radiation on the Asahimachi Baptist School Building.

== Formulation ==
While CBI Polymers has kept the full formulation a secret, The formula is a mix of surfactants, helates, thixotropy, wetting agents, defoamer, biocides and buffers.

DeconGel is currently active in three different formulas:

- DeconGel 1102 – Formulated for increased effectiveness on petroleum-based contaminants, including PCBs and oil spills. Applied by brush or trowel; spray on version also available.
- DeconGel 1108 – Formulated for heavy nuclear, toxic industrial chemical (TIC) and toxic industrial material (TIM) decontamination. Applied by brush or trowel.
- DeconGel 1128 – Spray-on version of 1108 for industrial sprayers and large coverage areas.

== Usage ==
DeconGel can encapsulate most radioactive isotopes such as H-3, C-14, F-18, I-125, I-131, Tc-99, Tl-201, tritiated thymidine and transuranics such as Am-241, Pu-238, Pu-239, Pu-240, Pu-241, Pu-242, Cs-137, Cs-134, Co-60, Mn-54, Fe-55, Ni-63, Ni-59, Sr-90 and Co-58 as well as most toxic industrial chemicals and materials such as meth lab wastes, asbestos, PCB, crude oil, antimony, arsenic, barium, beryllium, cadmium, chromium, cobalt, copper, lead, nickel, selenium, silver, zinc, and molybdenum.

DeconGel has special properties that "wet out" a surface, allowing the gel to penetrate into contiguous pores. Often contamination is considered "fixed" when in fact the contaminants are actually "loose" but trapped within pores, unable to be removed via common decontamination techniques. DeconGel can get within these pores and remove these contaminants making it appear that DeconGel has actually penetrated the substrate.

DeconGel can be applied by brush, trowel (small hand-held or large stand-up trowel) or sprayer (sprayer and/or product may need to be modified to work). For small surface areas a paint brush, a small trowel or a hand-held sprayer can be used. For large complex surfaces, an industrial type sprayer may be more practical. For large horizontal surfaces, either a sprayer or a stand-up trowel may be used.

When spraying DeconGel, multiple coats may be needed before peeling the gel from the surface. The thicker the dried gel is, the easier it is to remove from the surface.

== See also ==
- Decontamination foam
- Diphoterine
