= Contamination control =

Activities aiming to reduce contamination

Contamination control is the generic term for all activities aiming to control the existence, growth and proliferation of contamination in certain areas. Contamination control may refer to the atmosphere as well as to surfaces, to particulate matter as well as to microbes and to contamination prevention as well as to decontamination.

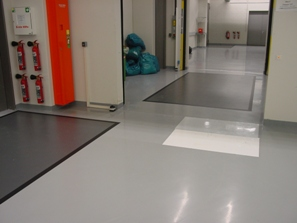
Contamination control measures at a premier lens manufacturer (Carl Zeiss)

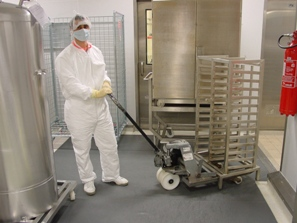
Flooring in a material handling area at the pharmaceutical company Lille, France

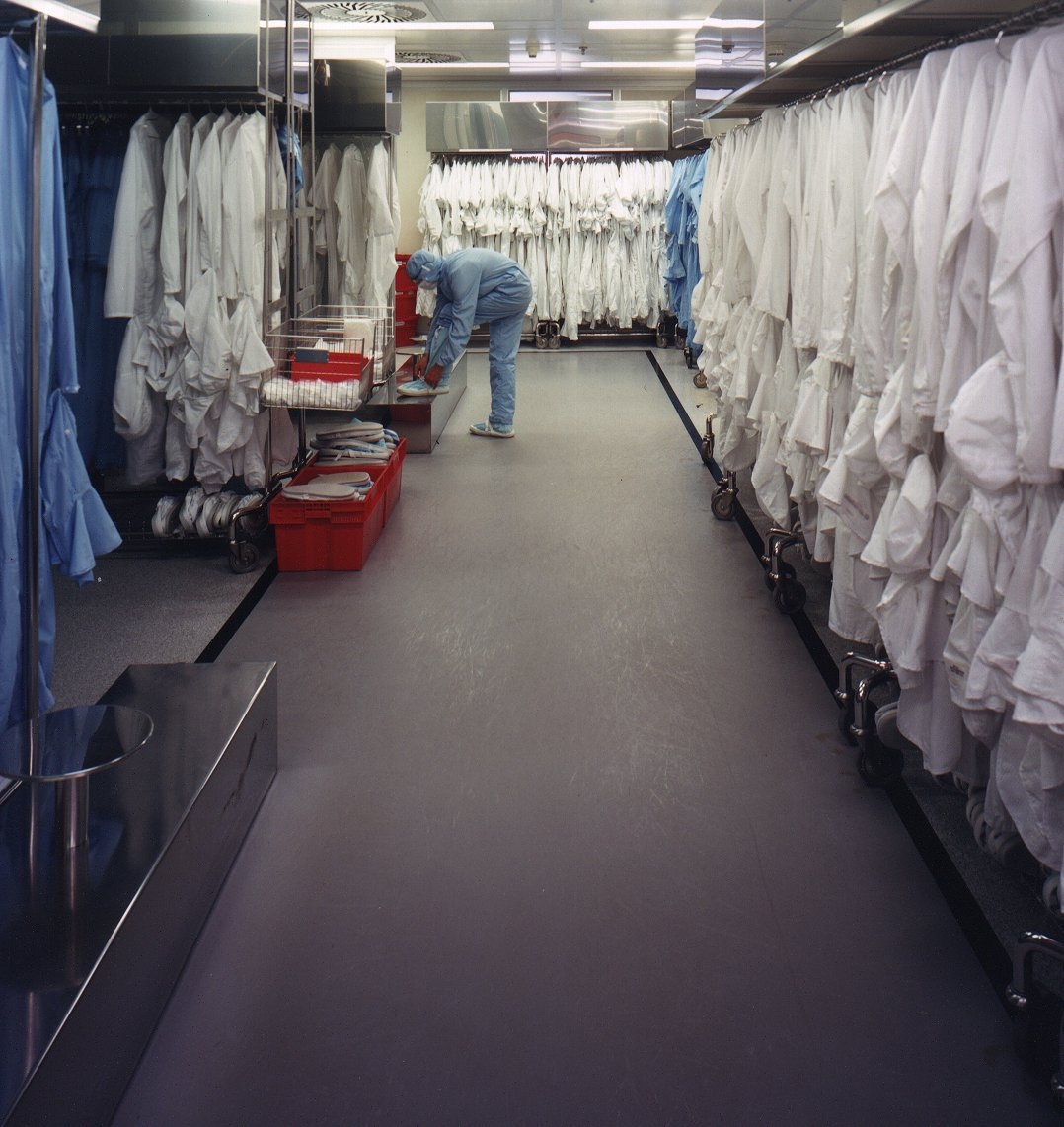
Gowning area at Alcatel, London, UK

== Function ==
The aim of all contamination control activities is to permanently ensure a sufficient level of cleanliness in controlled environments. This is accomplished by maintaining, reducing, or eradicating viable and non-viable contamination for either sanitary purposes or in order to maintain an efficient rate of production.

== Usage ==
One of the most common environments that incorporates contamination control into its standards protocol is the cleanroom. There are many preventive procedures in place within a cleanroom environment. They include subjecting cleanroom staff to strict clothing regulations, and there is often a gowning room where the staff can change clothes under sterile conditions so as to prevent any particulates from entering from the outside environment. Certain areas in the cleanroom have more stringent measures than others: packaging areas, corridors, gowning rooms and transfer hatches incorporate strict contamination control measures in order to maintain cleanroom standards.

Contamination control is also an important asset for industrial laboratories in the pharmaceutical and life science sectors. Other places of use include automotive paint shops, entrances to industrial kitchens and food service providers, many manufacturing areas, and electronic component assembly areas.

More recently, effective contamination control has been a concern for laboratories and other sensitive environments as a bio-security crisis management measure. Some banks and insurance companies use contamination control products as part of their disaster management protocols. Preventive measures are devised as preparation for combating potential pandemics or the proliferation of biohazards in any potential terrorist attack.

== Types of contamination ==
Besides particulate matter such as ions and molecules, the most common types of contamination are:

- People – Hair, fibre particles from bodies and clothes, also poor hygiene leading to deposition of microorganisms
- Environment – Dust particles, contaminated air, work surfaces, gases, movement ceilings, walls and floors
- Materials – Microorganisms on packaging, packaging also creates particles, fibres, dust.
- Equipment – Moving parts shavings drive belts.
- Buildings – Paint flaking, rusty pipe work, poorly maintained surfaces.
- Water – Microorganisms grow in water. equipment not cleaned correctly left in a damp condition, spills not mopped up properly etc.

Many types organisms are potentially detrimental to processes in a critical environment. Seven of the most common contaminants are:

- Aspergillus niger
- Burkholderia cepacia
- Clostridioides difficile
- Escherichia coli
- Methicillin resistant Staphylococcus aureus (MRSA)
- Pseudomonas aeruginosa
- Salmonella enteritidis

These and many other damaging contaminants can infiltrate critical areas in many ways. Particulates can enter by air, or on the feet of any carrier moving between the external environment and inside the critical area, for example.

== The effects of contamination ==
Contamination poses a significant risk to technical processes, experiments, or production activities, as well as to the individuals involved. Unguarded proliferation of contamination can quickly lead to product damage, yield reduction, product recalls and other outcomes highly detrimental to business. Products in several industries are recalled due to ineffective contamination control systems.

Based on this evidence it could be argued that many businesses are not adequately protecting themselves from the harmful effects of contamination, and many products in many industries are being recalled due to unsafe manufacturing processes.

== Types ==
Body movement causes contamination, and protective clothing such as hats, cleanroom suits and face masks are accordingly basic items of contamination control. Apart from people, another common way for contamination to enter is on the wheels of trolleys used to transport equipment.

To prevent airborne contamination, high-efficiency particulate air (HEPA) filters, airlocks, and cleanroom suits are used. HEPA filtration systems used in the medical sector incorporate high-energy ultraviolet light units to kill the live bacteria and viruses trapped by the filter media. These measures restrict the number of particulates within the atmosphere and inhibit the growth of those that are viable.

=== Sticky mats ===
Studies by 3M show that over 80% of contamination enters the cleanroom through entrances and exits, mostly at or near floor level. To combat this problem, suitable flooring systems are used that effectively attract, retain and inhibit the growth of viable organisms. Studies show that the most effective type of flooring system is one of polymer composition.

Polymer mats are particularly effective due to their suppleness as they allow for more contact with serrations on shoes and wheels and can accommodate more particles while still remaining effective. An electrostatic potential adds to the effectiveness of this type of contamination control as it enables particles to be retained until the flooring is cleaned. This method of attracting and retaining particles is more effective than mats with an active adhesive coating which needs to be peeled and is often not as supple. As long as the tack level of the mat is greater than the donor's (such as a foot or a wheel), the contamination touching the surface will be removed. Very high tack surfaces pose a contamination threat because they are prone to pulling off overshoe protection. Polymeric flooring is produced to ensure a higher level of tackiness than the surfaces it comes into contact with, without causing discomfort and potentially damaging 'stickiness'.

=== Copper alloy surfaces ===
Copper alloy surfaces have intrinsic properties that effectively and quickly destroy microbes. They are being installed in healthcare facilities and a subway transit system as a protective public health measure in addition to regular cleaning. The United States Environmental Protection Agency (EPA) has approved the registration of 355 different antibacterial copper alloys that kill E. coli O157:H7, methicillin-resistant Staphylococcus aureus (MRSA), Staphylococcus, Enterobacter aerogenes, and Pseudomonas aeruginosa. The EPA has determined that when cleaned regularly, these copper alloy surfaces:

- Continuously reduce bacterial contamination, achieving a 99.9% reduction within two hours of exposure;
- Kill greater than 99.9% of Gram-negative and Gram-positive bacteria within two hours of exposure;
- Deliver continuous and ongoing antibacterial action, remaining effective in killing more than 99.9% of the bacteria within two hours;
- Kill more than 99.9% of the bacteria within two hours and continue to kill 99% of the bacteria even after repeated contamination;
- Help inhibit the buildup and growth of bacteria within two hours of exposure between routine cleaning and sanitizing steps.

As a contamination control measure, EPA has approved a long list of antimicrobial copper products "with public health benefits" made from these copper alloys, such as bed rails, handrails, over-bed tables, sinks, faucets, door knobs, toilet hardware, computer keyboards, health club equipment, shopping cart handles, etc. (For a comprehensive list of products, see: Antimicrobial copper-alloy touch surfaces § Approved products).

== See also ==
- Cleanroom
- Decontamination
- HEPA
- Decontamination foam
- Web cleaning
