= Web cleaning =

Industrial processes for cleaning webs

Web cleaning is a process used in industrial production to remove dust, fibres and other loose particles from moving webs or sheets. It is applied in the manufacturing and converting of paper, corrugated board, film, glass, nonwovens, tissue, and other substrates, in printing processes, as well as in electronics manufacturing, such as printed circuit boards, semiconductor components and electronic assemblies, to prevent defects during assembly or downstream processing operations.

== Background ==
As industrial production became faster and more complex during the twentieth century, controlling contamination in web-fed processes became increasingly important. Surface contamination, originating from the material itself or the production environment, can affect downstream operations and contribute to equipment wear and safety concerns.

== Sources of contamination ==
Particles on webs or sheets of materials can originate from several sources or mechanisms, including:

- fibers or particles released from the material itself during production
- contamination generated during converting processes such as cutting, sheeting, creasing, folding, or stacking
- electrostatic charge that can attract particles to the substrate
- particles generated by wear of machine components, including metals or plastics
- ambient dust present in open production environments

== Impact of contamination ==
Contamination on webs or sheets can affect product quality and process stability in several ways, depending on the application and substrate. Reported effects include:

- defects during printing
- inclusions or imperfections in laminated or coated products
- particles in electronics manufacturing may cause short circuits or impair the correct assembly of circuit boards
- unacceptable dust in food and pharmaceuticals packaging
- problems associated with feed preparation and conveying
- abrasive wear of machine parts
- contamination related health problems

== Inspection and testing ==
Substrates can be checked for surface contamination in various ways, often through a combination of in-line inspection during production and quality sampling. Specialised standards and inspection systems have been developed for print media such as paper and cardboard.

In printing, in-line print inspection and measurement systems are used to detect defects that may indicate contamination. Keeping track of blanket or ink-cleaning intervals is another way to monitor the substrate's cleanliness: an increase in cleaning frequency often indicates higher levels of dust or contamination.

In the production of float glass, automated optical inspection (machine vision) is used for continuous detection of foreign particles, with tolerances set based on quality requirements and subsequent processing.

During the production of electronics, technical cleanliness inspection includes counting and analyzing particles on the substrate, as well as standardized tests for contamination on printed circuit boards and electronic assemblies.

== Web cleaning methods ==
Depending on the application and substrate, web cleaning is used to remove contamination, a procedure that can be performed using contact or non-contact cleaning methods.

=== Contact systems ===
Contact cleaning systems rely on direct contact between the cleaning element and the substrate, for example, by using elastomer rollers, adhesive rollers, or brushes. These systems are typically applied where the material and surface characteristics allow mechanical contact without damaging the substrate. For instance, in the production of rigid substrates such as printed circuit boards, contact-based cleaning methods are commonly used to remove particulate contamination from panel or board surfaces before subsequent assembly steps.

=== Non-contact systems ===
Non-contact cleaning systems remove particles without touching the substrate, typically using controlled airflow, ionisation, and vacuum extraction. These methods are often used in high-speed production environments or when sensitive surfaces require cleaning without mechanical contact.

=== Mechanisms for particle adhesion and removal ===
Particles can be retained on a moving web due to the interaction between the particles and the surface. Examples include van der Waals force and electrostatic forces. Surface roughness can also influence how many particles remain on the web.

As the web moves, viscous interaction at the material surface causes air near the surface to be carried along with the web. This results in an air boundary layer along the web surface. The air velocity in this boundary layer decreases as the distance from the moving surface increases. This airflow can carry loose particles.

In cleaning methods that use airflow or extraction, both removing particles carried in the near-surface airflow and setting particles retained on the substrate in motion play a role. When electrostatic forces contribute to adhesion, ionization can neutralize static charge and reduce the electrostatic contribution to adhesion.

Particles retained on the substrate can only be set in motion when the forces acting on them are strong enough to overcome their adhesion to the surface. Depending on the cleaning method, this can be done through mechanical contact, aerodynamic forces, or a combination of both. After the particles are detached from the surface, they must be removed or collected to reduce the risk of redeposition.
