= Hydrofluoric acid burn =

- Other names: Hydrofluoric acid toxicity
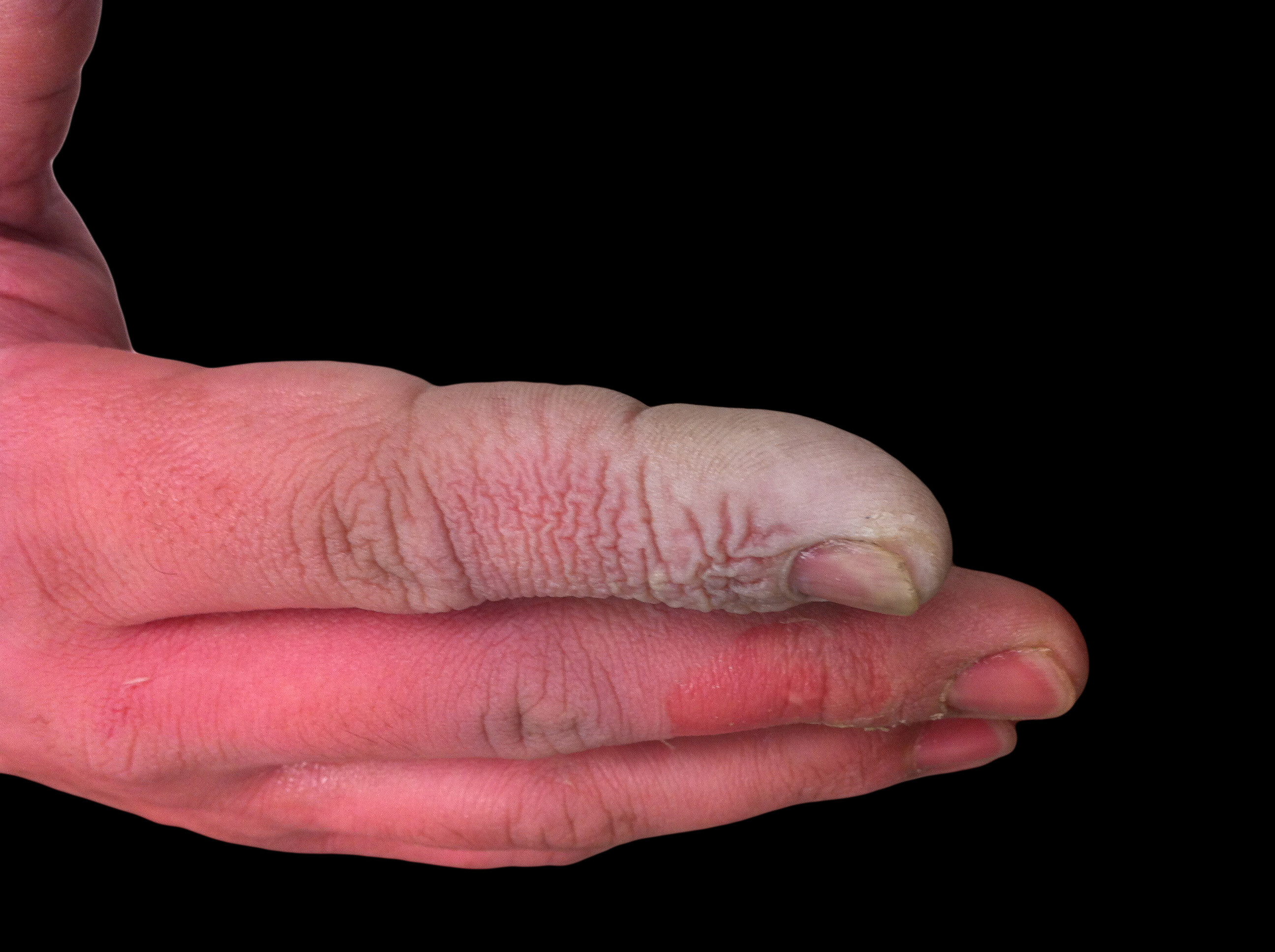
- A hydrofluoric acid burn of the hand
- Specialty: Toxicology
- Symptoms: Severe pain at the site of exposure
- Complications: electrolyte, heart, lung, and neurological problems
- Usual onset: Immediate or delayed
- Causes: Hydrofluoric acid
- Diagnostic method: Based on history of exposure and symptoms
- Treatment: Removing contaminated clothing, washing with water, calcium gluconate
- Frequency: Rare

A hydrofluoric acid burn is a chemical burn from hydrofluoric acid. Where it contacts the skin it results in significant pain, swelling, redness, and skin breakdown. If the fumes are breathed in swelling of the upper airway and bleeding may occur. Complications can include electrolyte imbalance, heart, lung, kidney, gastroenterological, and neurological problems.

Most exposures occur at work. With concentrations less than 7%, onset of symptoms may not occur for hours while with concentrations greater than 15% onset of symptoms is nearly immediate. Diagnosis should include blood tests for calcium, potassium, and magnesium along with an electrocardiogram.

Initial treatment of exposure involves removing contaminated clothing and washing with large amounts of water over at least 30 minutes. Other measures include applying calcium gluconate cream. It is estimated that about a thousand cases occur each year globally. Most people affected are adult males.

== Signs and symptoms ==
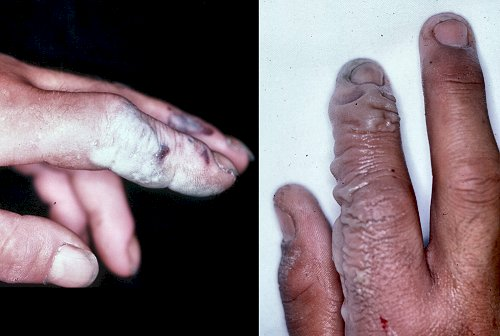
HF burns, not evident until a day after

Symptoms of HF exposure include irritation of the eyes, skin, nose, and throat; eye and skin burns; and bone damage.

Complications may occur due to fluoride toxicity. Once absorbed into blood through the skin, it reacts with blood calcium and may cause cardiac arrest. Burns with areas larger than 160 cm^{2} (25 square inches) have the potential to cause serious systemic toxicity from interference with blood and tissue calcium levels. In some cases, exposures can lead to hypocalcemia.

Breathing in the HF fumes can result in fevers, pulmonary edema (fluid buildup in the lungs), bleeding, and low blood oxygen.

== Cause ==
Hydrogen fluoride is used in a number of industries including glass etching and electronics manufacturing.

It is generated upon combustion of many fluorine-containing compounds such as products containing Viton and polytetrafluoroethylene (Teflon) parts. Hydrofluorocarbons in automatic fire suppression systems can release hydrogen fluoride at high temperatures, and this has led to deaths from acute respiratory failure in military personnel when a rocket-propelled grenade hit the fire suppression system in their vehicle. Hydrofluoric acid can be released from volcanoes, sea salt aerosol, and from welding or manufacturing processes.

== Pathophysiology ==
In the body, hydrofluoric acid reacts with the ubiquitous biologically important ions Ca^{2+} and Mg^{2+}. Formation of insoluble calcium fluoride is proposed as the cause for both precipitous fall in serum calcium and the severe pain associated with tissue toxicity.

== Diagnosis ==
Diagnosis should include blood tests for calcium, potassium, and magnesium along with an electrocardiogram (ECG). ECG changes may include QRS widening and a prolonged QT interval.

== Treatment ==
Initial treatment of exposure involves removing contaminated clothing and washing the affected area with large amount of water over at least 30 minutes. Calcium gluconate cream is then usually applied. If pain continues calcium gluconate can be injected into the affected area or given by injection into a vein or artery. Surgical removal of the affected tissue may be required.

The calcium gluconate is a source of Ca^{2+} that sequesters the fluoride ions. Other special rinsing solutions may also be used. Hexafluorine Solution has been used to mitigate the adverse effects of chemical burns and counteract the effect of calcium precipitation, due to the triple effect of rinsing and diluting like water, neutralization of the hydrogen ions and chelation of the fluoride ions. However, further studies have found the efficacy of the solution in reducing the longer term effects of electrolyte imbalance is almost identical to that of water rinsing.

Inhaled HF may require oxygen therapy and tracheal intubation. In this situation nebulized calcium gluconate may be used. In rare cases of internal organ exposure to hydrofluoric acid, damage such as fulminant colitis requiring prompt surgical intervention can result.

In all cases involving any amount of hydrofluoric acid burn, emergency services should be contacted immediately.
