= Crowd control =

Public security practice

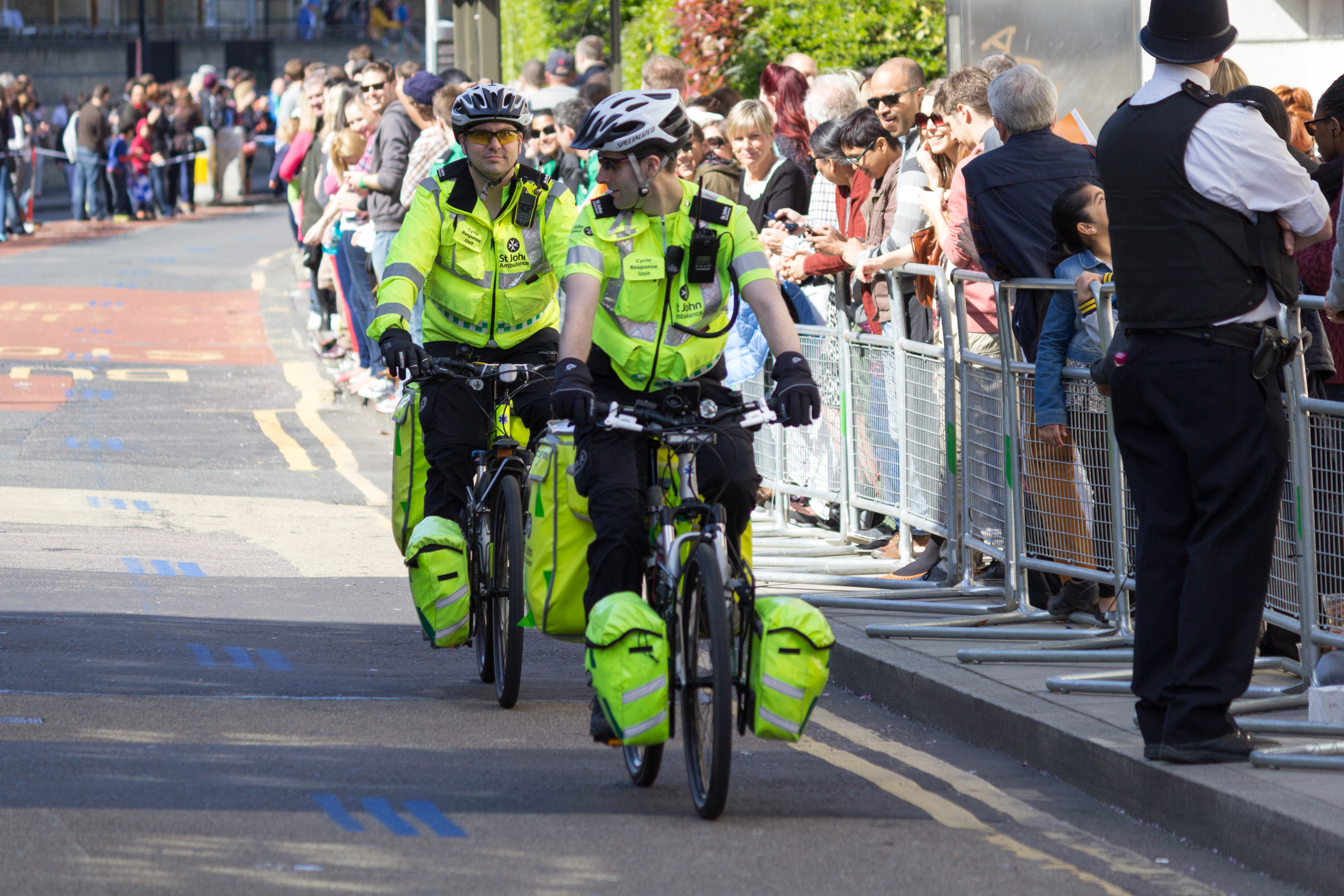
During the 2014 London Marathon, a police officer keeps spectators behind a fence, while first aiders patrol.

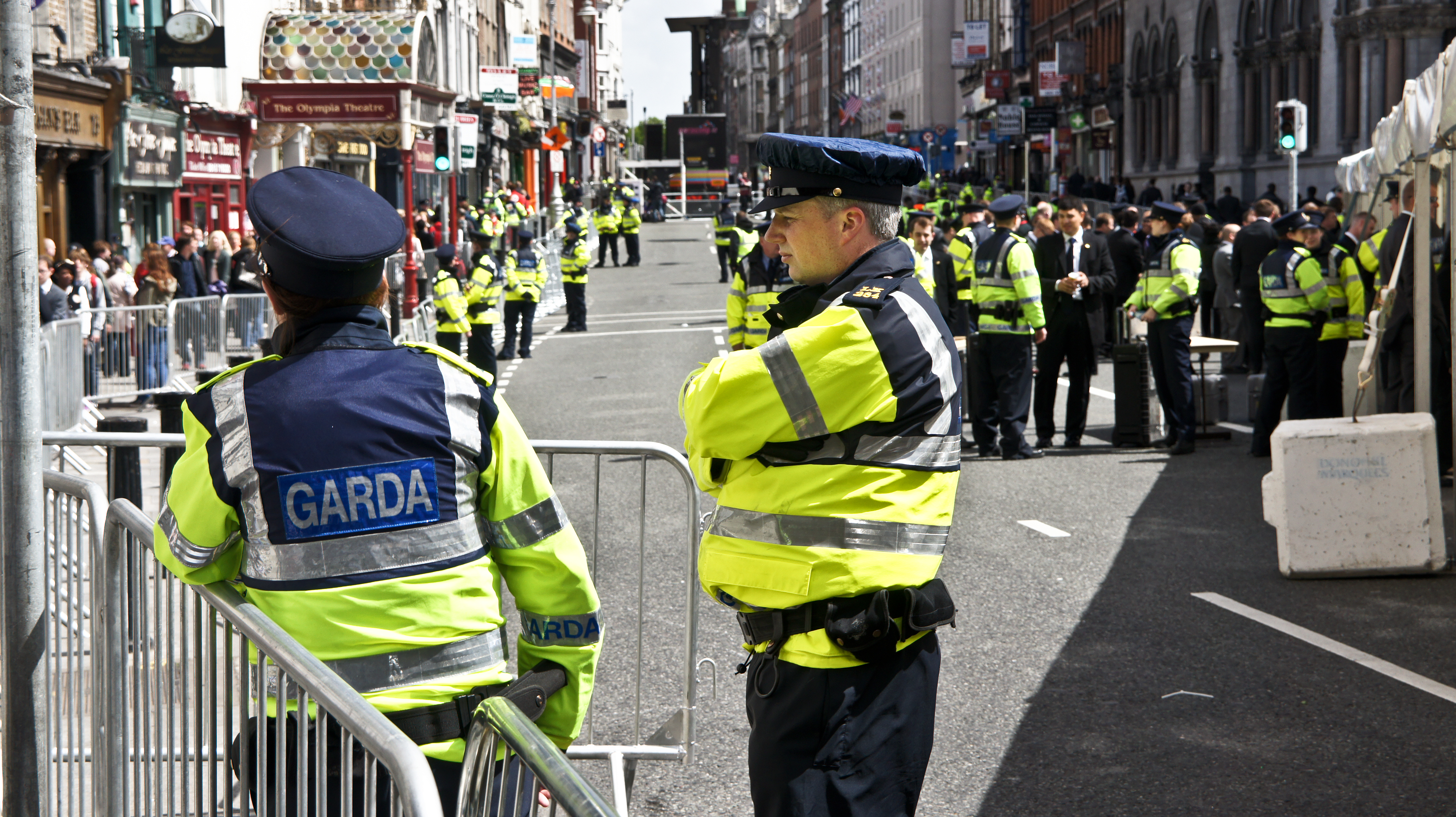
Garda Síochána officers on guard duty at a cleared street in Dublin, Ireland, when US president Barack Obama visited the country in 2011.

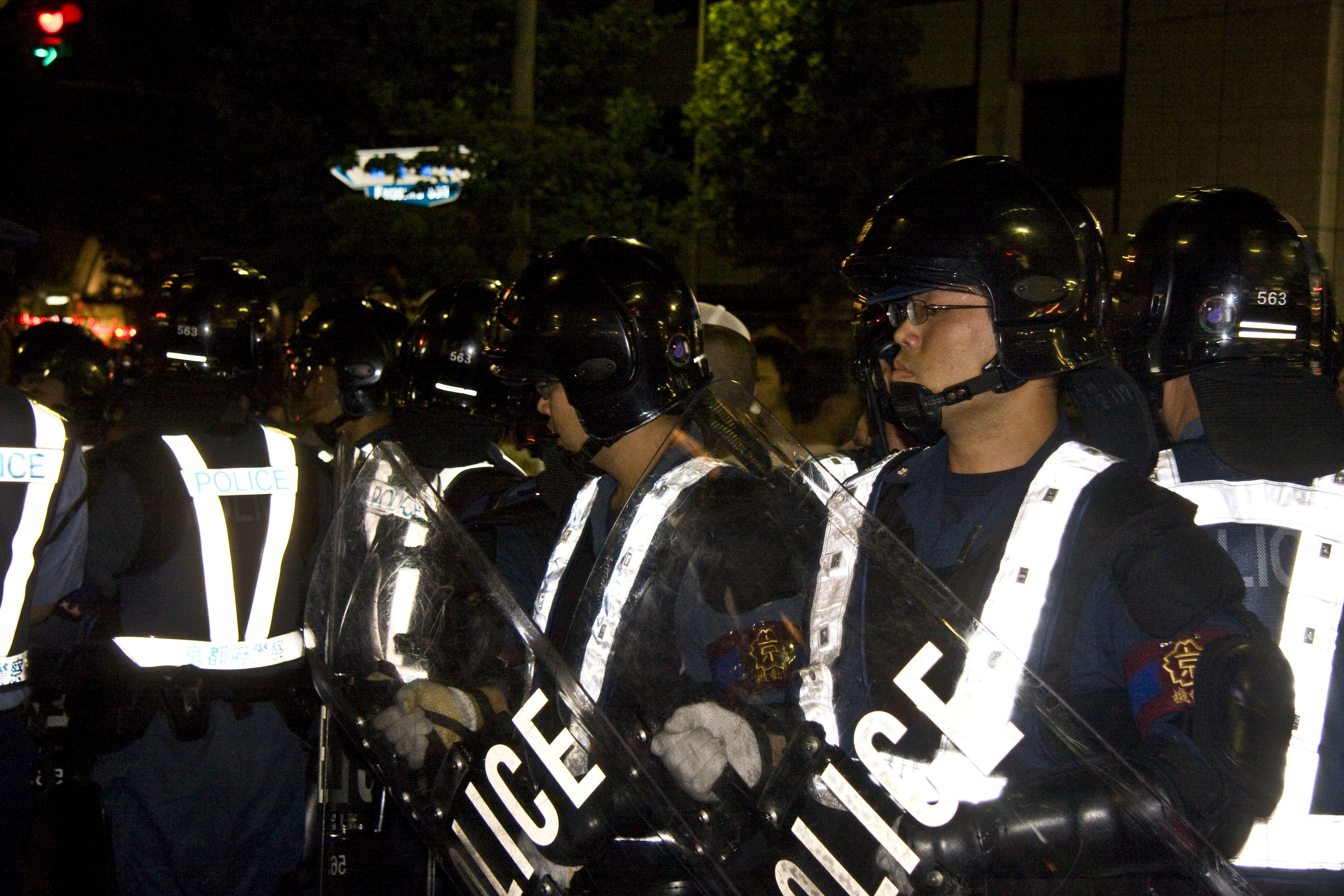
Kyoto Prefectural Riot Police Unit officers on duty during the Gion Matsuri 2008 festival

Crowd control is a public security practice in which large crowds are managed in order to prevent the outbreak of crowd crushes, affray, fights involving drunk and disorderly people or riots. Crowd crushes in particular can cause many hundreds of fatalities. Effective crowd management is about managing expected and unexpected crowd occurrences. Crowd control can involve privately hired security guards as well as police officers. Crowd control is often used at large, public gatherings like street fairs, music festivals, stadiums and public demonstrations. At some events, security guards and police use metal detectors and sniffer dogs to prevent weapons and drugs being brought into a venue.

== Equipment ==
Materials such as stanchions, crowd control barriers, fences and decals painted on the ground can be used to direct a crowd. A common method of crowd control is to use high visibility fencing to divert and corral pedestrian traffic to safety when there is any potential threat for danger. Keeping the crowd comfortable and relaxed is also essential, so things like awnings, cooling fans (in hot weather), and entertainment are sometimes used as well. Thus, restrictive measures and the application of force can actually make crowding more dangerous, for instance during the Hillsborough disaster. For controlling riots and demonstrations, see riot control.

Specific products that are used to implement line management and public guidance in high traffic areas include retractable belt systems (which incorporate a stanchion post and the retractable tape) and wall mount systems (also incorporating a retractable belt but are surface mounted). Post and rope systems are also popular, especially in banks and theaters.

== History ==
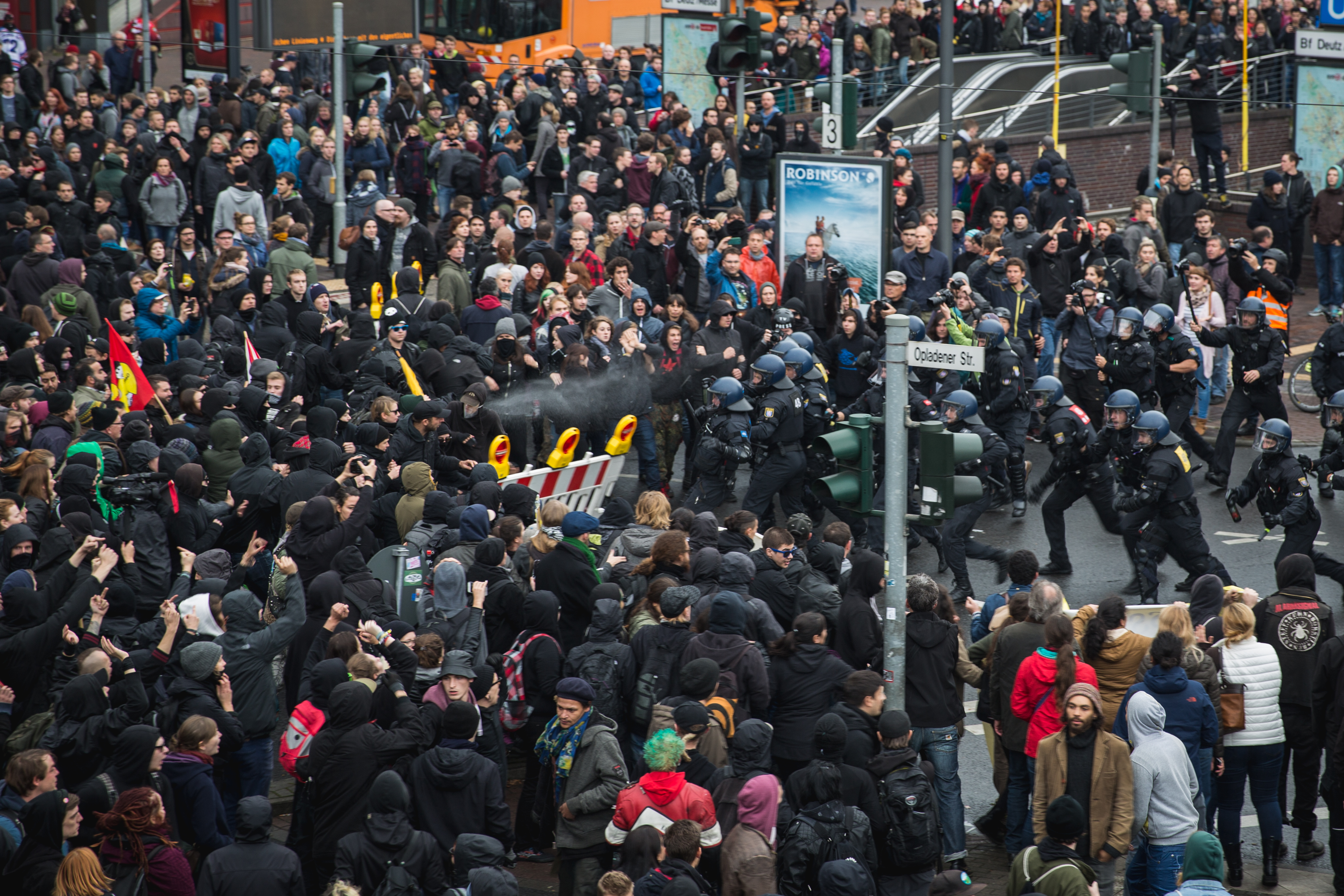
Anarchist black bloc protesting forming a collective area

The earliest form of crowd control was the riot line. This was the standard procedure from the 1920s to the 1940s, before the existence of dedicated crowd control police units. The formation consisted of ten to twenty officers in a line, typically armed with blunt weapons and wearing minimal protection. There were typically three to four lines, spaced twenty to thirty feet apart. The goal of these lines was to push back and possibly disperse the crowd. This usually resulted in fighting once the crowd contacted the riot line, and officer injuries often occurred.

Later in the 1950s, the first actual riot control teams armed with riot shields and batons appeared; the goal was for the riot shield officers to hold up the lines. When they came to actual contact with the crowd, the officers with the batons were supposed to help the riot shield officers. However, if deadly force was used against them, there was no training or procedure to counter this causing the officers to have to fend for themselves.

The 1960s and 1970s marked the invention and widespread use of the tear gas. However, with this new innovation, the officers were not used to operating in an environment where visibility was limited. The armor that they wore at the time was not as mobile. This results in that type of armor being rarely used.

A crowd controller is also another name for a bouncer or doorman.

== See also ==
- Crowd collapses and crushes – Type of disaster that occurs due to overcrowding
  - List of fatal crowd crushes
- Crowd control barrier – Temporary enclosure of a place
- Crowd manipulation – Branch of social psychology
- Decontamination foam – Cleaning solution
- Fence – Freestanding structure preventing movement across a boundary
  - Temporary fencing – Temporary enclosure of a place
- Kettling – Police tactic of containing people at a protest
- Riot control – Measures taken against unlawful or violent crowds of people
- Rope line – Setting for celebrity/fans interaction
