= Hotel Football =

Hotel in Greater Manchester, England

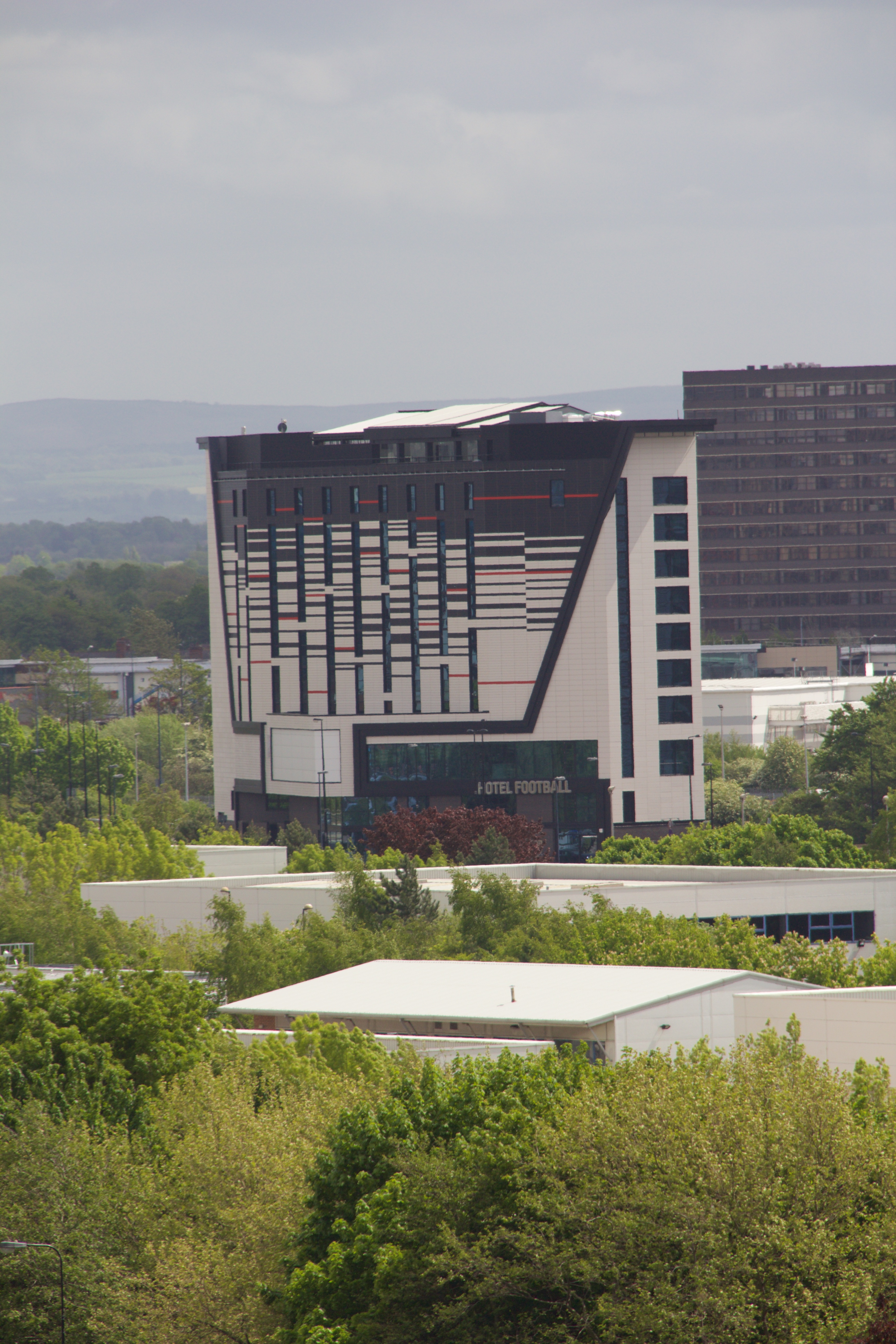
- Interactive map of the Hotel Football area

General information
- Location: 99 Sir Matt Busby Way, Stretford, Greater Manchester, England
- Coordinates: 53.464339°N 2.2895354°W
- Opening: 2015
- Owner: Ryan Giggs, Phil Neville, Gary Neville, Paul Scholes, Nicky Butt, and GG Hospitality

Technical details
- Floor count: 12

Design and construction
- Architect: AEW Architects

Other information
- Number of rooms: 133
- Number of restaurants: 1

Website
- hotelfootball.com

Hotel Football is an upscale football-themed hotel overlooking Old Trafford, the home of Manchester United F.C., in Trafford, England. It is owned by former players Ryan Giggs, Paul Scholes, Nicky Butt, Phil Neville and Gary Neville, as well as the GG Hospitality Management Company. The hotel was built at a cost of £24 million and features 133 rooms, a restaurant called Cafe Football and a five-a-side football pitch on the roof. It opened in March 2015.

== History ==
Gary Neville initially purchased a plot of land underneath a canal bridge close to Old Trafford from a group of Manchester United F.C. fans who owned the land with the intention of building a club house. They agreed to sell Neville the land to build a hotel on, providing he promised to build a greyhound track as part of the hotel.

In 2011 Stuart Procter, former general manager of the Stafford Hotel in London, was drafted in to mastermind the build and development of a football-themed hotel by members of The Class of '92, the idea behind the hotel being to hark back to the golden era of football of the 1990s, before ticket prices soared 1,000 per cent, pricing out many fans. The construction of the hotel was handled by Galliford Try and features subtle football references throughout the building.

In May 2014, to promote the construction of the hotel and its impending opening, the ex-players involved in financing the construction played a game of five-a-side football on the roof of the hotel against a team of builders involved in the construction. In November 2014, Gary Neville won permission to put a 16 m × 12 m (52 ft × 39 ft) five-a-side football pitch on top of the ten-storey hotel, a previous application had been approved in May of that year but changes to the design meant a resubmission was required. Manchester United F.C. objected to the plan, claiming the scheme on the site of a former lard factory undermined the "holistic vision" of its "strategic plan" for the area.

== Facilities ==
Old Trafford Supporters Club, a 550-capacity basement bar with TV screens and a terrace. Cafe Football, a 185-seat restaurant with a menu overseen by two-Michelin-star chef Michael Wignall of the Pennyhill Park Hotel. Heaven, a bookable five-a-side astroturf pitch which on match days turns into a bar and barbecue area.

Hotel Football also offers services to companies who wish to host events with two separate function rooms. The Professional Football Scouts Association currently hold their Scouting Courses within the Players Lounge.
