= Old Trafford =

Football stadium in Greater Manchester, England

Coordinates: 53°27′47″N 2°17′29″W

- "The Theatre of Dreams"
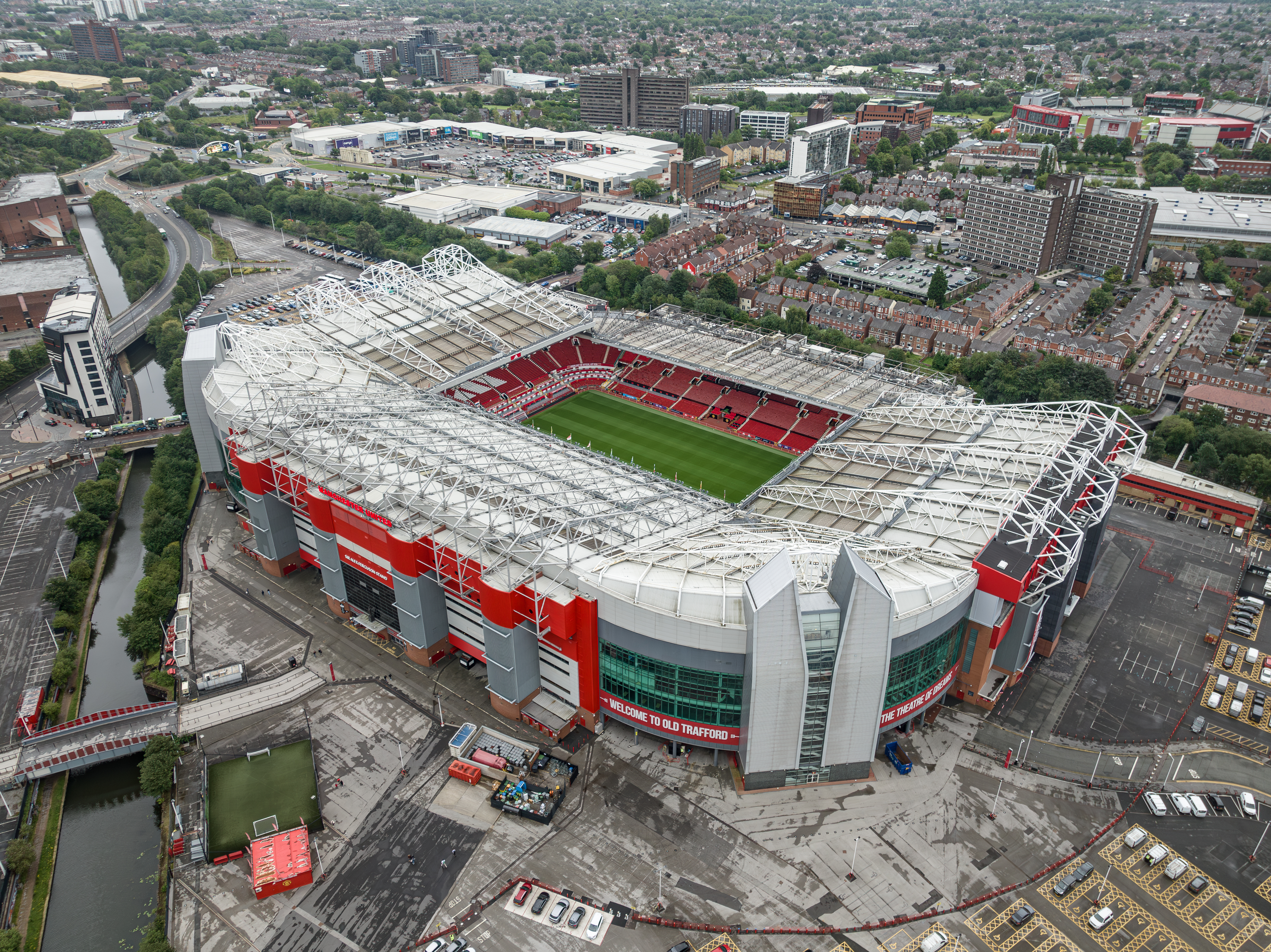
- UEFA
- Interactive map of Old Trafford
- Address: Sir Matt Busby Way
- Location: Old Trafford; Greater Manchester, England; M16 0RA
- Owner: Manchester United
- Operator: Manchester United
- Capacity: 74,158
- Surface: Desso GrassMaster
- Record attendance: 76,962 (Wolverhampton Wanderers vs Grimsby Town, 25 March 1939)
- Field size: 105 m × 68 m (115 yd × 74 yd)
- Public transit: Wharfside; Old Trafford

Construction
- Groundbreaking: 1909
- Opened: 19 February 1910; 116 years ago
- Renovated: 1941, 1946–1949, 1951, 1957, 1973, 1995–1996, 2000, 2006
- Cost: £90,000 (1909)
- Architect: Archibald Leitch (1909)

Tenant
- Manchester United (1910–present)

Old Trafford (/ˈtræfərd/) is a football stadium in the Old Trafford area of Greater Manchester, England. It is the home ground of Manchester United. With a capacity of 74,158, it is the largest club football stadium in the United Kingdom, and the eleventh-largest in Europe. It is about half a mile (800 metres) from Old Trafford Cricket Ground and the adjacent tram stop.

Nicknamed the "Theatre of Dreams" by Bobby Charlton, Old Trafford has been United's home ground since 1910, although from 1941 to 1949 the club shared Maine Road with local rivals Manchester City due to the Blitz. Old Trafford underwent several expansions in the 1990s and 2000s, including the addition of extra tiers to the North, West and East Stands, almost returning the stadium to its original capacity of 80,000 in 2006, up from roughly 44,000 in 1993, following the conversion to an all-seater stadium. Should further expansion occur, it is likely to involve the addition of a second tier to the South Stand, which would raise the capacity to around 88,000, although alternative suggestions have been made for a new stadium in recent years. The stadium's record attendance was recorded in 1939, when 76,962 spectators watched the FA Cup semi-final between Wolverhampton Wanderers and Grimsby Town.

Old Trafford has hosted an FA Cup Final, two final replays and was regularly used as a neutral venue for the competition's semi-finals. It has also hosted England fixtures, and matches at the 1966 FIFA World Cup, UEFA Euro 1996, the 2012 Summer Olympics and UEFA Women's Euro 2022. The stadium also hosted the 2003 Champions League Final. Outside football, the stadium is used occasionally for rugby league. It has been the venue for the Rugby Football League's annual Super League Grand Final, and previously Premiership Final, since 1987. In addition, it has been a host venue for four editions of the Rugby League World Cup - 1995, 2000, 2013, and 2021 (men's and women's).

== History ==
=== Construction and early years ===
Before 1902, Manchester United were known as Newton Heath, during which time they first played their football matches at North Road and then Bank Street in Clayton. However, both grounds were blighted by wretched conditions, the pitches ranging from gravel to marsh, while Bank Street suffered from clouds of fumes from its neighbouring factories. Therefore, following the club's rescue from near-bankruptcy and renaming, the new chairman John Henry Davies decided in 1909 that the Bank Street ground was not fit for a team that had recently won the First Division and FA Cup, so he donated funds for the construction of a new stadium. Not one to spend money frivolously, Davies scouted around Manchester for an appropriate site, before settling on a patch of land adjacent to the Bridgewater Canal, just off the north end of the Warwick Road in Old Trafford.

Designed by Scottish architect Archibald Leitch, who designed several other stadia, the ground was originally designed with a capacity of 100,000 spectators and featured seating in the south stand under cover, while the remaining three stands were left as terraces and uncovered. Including the purchase of the land, the construction of the stadium was originally to have cost £60,000 all told. However, as costs began to rise, to reach the intended capacity would have cost an extra £30,000 over the original estimate and, at the suggestion of club secretary J. J. Bentley, the capacity was reduced to approximately 80,000. Nevertheless, at a time when transfer fees were still around the £1,000 mark, the cost of construction only served to reinforce the club's "Moneybags United" epithet, with which they had been tarred since Davies had taken over as chairman.

In May 1908, Archibald Leitch wrote to the Cheshire Lines Committee (CLC) – who had a rail depot adjacent to the proposed site for the football ground – in an attempt to persuade them to subsidise construction of the grandstand alongside the railway line. The subsidy would have come to the sum of £10,000, to be paid back at the rate of £2,000 per annum for five years or half of the gate receipts for the grandstand each year until the loan was repaid. However, despite guarantees for the loan coming from the club itself and two local breweries, both chaired by club chairman John Henry Davies, the Cheshire Lines Committee turned the proposal down. The CLC had planned to build a new station adjacent to the new stadium, with the promise of an anticipated £2,750 per annum in fares offsetting the £9,800 cost of building the station. The station – Trafford Park – was eventually built, but further down the line than originally planned. The CLC later constructed a modest station with one timber-built platform immediately adjacent to the stadium and this opened on 21 August 1935. It was initially named United Football Ground, but was renamed Old Trafford Football Ground in early 1936. It was served on match days only by a shuttle service of steam trains from Manchester Central railway station. It is currently known as Manchester United Football Ground.

Construction was carried out by Messrs Brameld and Smith of Manchester and development was completed in late 1909. The stadium hosted its inaugural game on 19 February 1910, with United playing host to Liverpool. However, the home side were unable to provide their fans with a win to mark the occasion, as Liverpool won 4–3. Sandy Turnbull scored the first ever goal at Old Trafford. A journalist at the game reported the stadium as "the most handsomest [sic], the most spacious and the most remarkable arena I have ever seen. As a football ground it is unrivalled in the world, it is an honour to Manchester and the home of a team who can do wonders when they are so disposed".

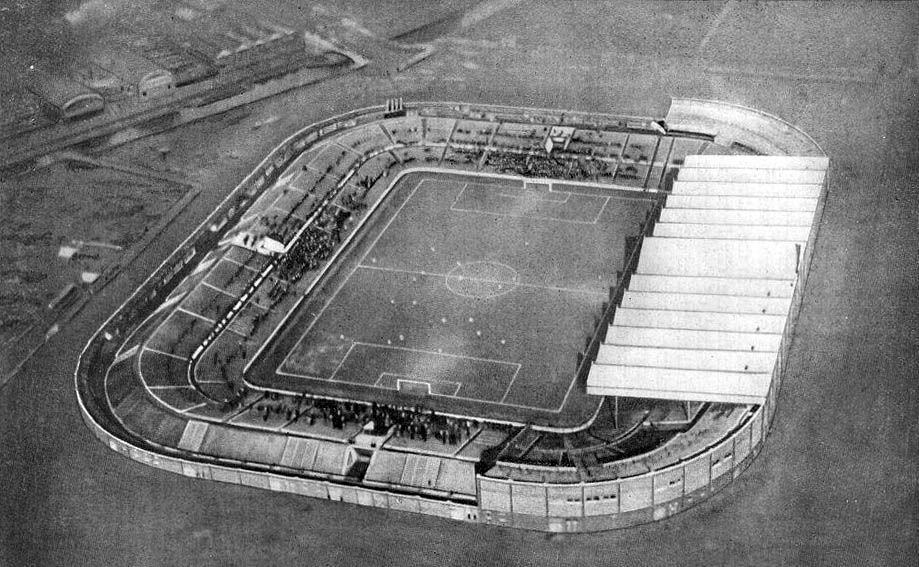
Old Trafford in the 1920s

Before the construction of Wembley Stadium in 1923, the FA Cup Final was hosted by a number of different grounds around England, including Old Trafford. The first of these was the 1911 FA Cup Final replay between Bradford City and Newcastle United, after the original tie at Crystal Palace finished as a no-score draw after extra time. Bradford won 1–0, the goal scored by Jimmy Speirs, in a match watched by 58,000 people. The ground's second FA Cup Final was the 1915 final between Sheffield United and Chelsea. Sheffield United won the match 3–0 in front of nearly 50,000 spectators, most of whom were in the military, leading to the final being nicknamed "the Khaki Cup Final". On 27 December 1920, Old Trafford played host to its largest pre-Second World War attendance for a United league match, as 70,504 spectators watched the Red Devils lose 3–1 to Aston Villa. The ground hosted its first international football match later that decade, when England lost 1–0 to Scotland in front of 49,429 spectators on 17 April 1926. Unusually, the record attendance at Old Trafford is not for a Manchester United home game. Instead, on 25 March 1939, 76,962 people watched an FA Cup semi-final between Wolverhampton Wanderers and Grimsby Town.

=== Wartime bombing ===
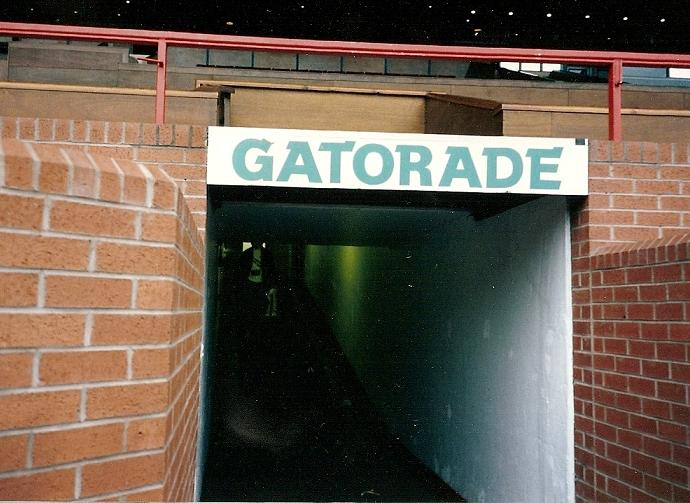
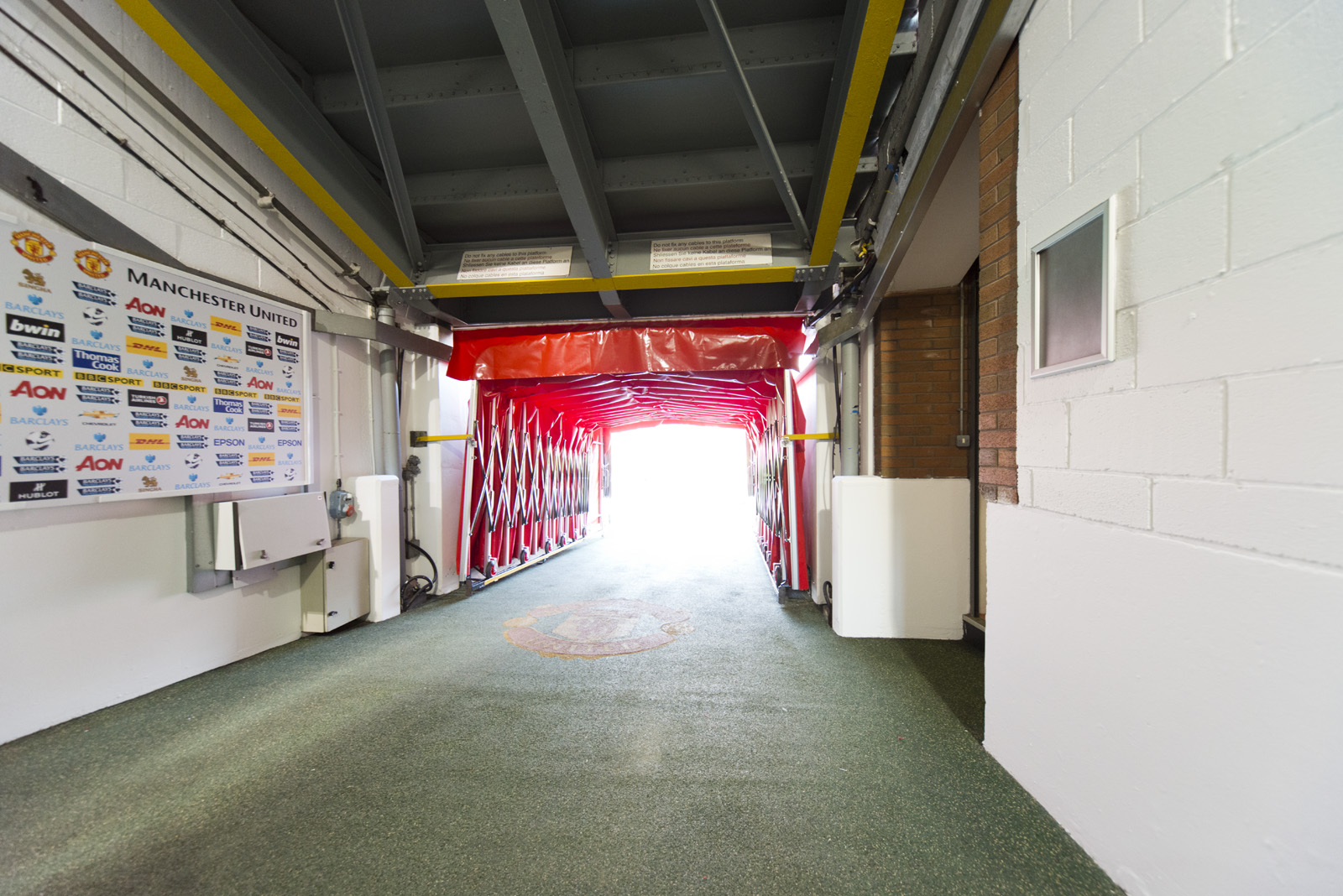
The central tunnel at Old Trafford (left) is the only surviving part of the original 1910 stadium after the stadium's bombing in World War II. The corner tunnel (right) is now used by players on matchday.

In 1936, as part of a £35,000 refurbishment, an 80-yard-long roof was added to the United Road stand (now the Sir Alex Ferguson Stand) for the first time, while roofs were added to the south corners in 1938. Upon the outbreak of the Second World War, Old Trafford was requisitioned by the military to be used as a depot. Football continued to be played at the stadium, but a German bombing raid on Trafford Park on 22 December 1940 damaged the stadium to the extent that a Christmas Day fixture against Stockport County had to be switched to Stockport's ground. Football resumed at Old Trafford on 8 March 1941, but another German raid on 11 March 1941 destroyed much of the stadium, notably the main stand (now the South Stand), forcing the club's operations to move to Cornbrook Cold Storage, owned by United chairman James W. Gibson. After pressure from Gibson, the War Damage Commission granted Manchester United £4,800 to remove the debris and £17,478 to rebuild the stands. During the reconstruction of the stadium, Manchester United played their "home" games at Maine Road, the home of their cross-town rivals, Manchester City, at a cost of £5,000 a year plus a percentage of the gate receipts. The club was now £15,000 in debt, not helped by the rental of Maine Road, and the Labour MP for Stoke, Ellis Smith, petitioned the Government to increase the club's compensation package, but it was in vain. Though Old Trafford was reopened, albeit without cover, in 1949, it meant that a league game had not been played at the stadium for nearly 10 years. United's first game back at Old Trafford was played on 24 August 1949, as 41,748 spectators witnessed a 3–0 victory over Bolton Wanderers.

=== Completion of the master plan ===
A roof was restored to the Main Stand by 1951 and, soon after, the three remaining stands were covered, the operation culminating with the addition of a roof to the Stretford End (now the West Stand) in 1959. The club also invested £40,000 in the installation of proper floodlighting, so that they would be able to use the stadium for the European games that were played in the late evening of weekdays, instead of having to play at Maine Road. In order to avoid obtrusive shadows being cast on the pitch, two sections of the Main Stand roof were cut away. The first match to be played under floodlights at Old Trafford was a First Division match between Manchester United and Bolton Wanderers on 25 March 1957.

However, although the spectators would now be able to see the players at night, they still suffered from the problem of obstructed views caused by the pillars that supported the roofs. With the 1966 FIFA World Cup fast approaching, at which the stadium would host three group matches, this prompted the United directors to completely redesign the United Road (north) stand. The old roof pillars were replaced in 1965 with modern-style cantilevering on top of the roof, allowing every spectator a completely unobstructed view, while it was also expanded to hold 20,000 spectators (10,000 seated and 10,000 standing in front) at a cost of £350,000. The architects of the new stand, Mather and Nutter (now Atherden Fuller), rearranged the organisation of the stand to have terracing at the front, a larger seated area towards the back, and the first private boxes at a British football ground. The east stand – the only remaining uncovered stand – was developed in the same style in 1973. With the first two stands converted to cantilevers, the club's owners devised a long-term plan to do the same to the other two stands and convert the stadium into a bowl-like arena. Such an undertaking would serve to increase the atmosphere within the ground by containing the crowd's noise and focusing it onto the pitch, where the players would feel the full effects of a capacity crowd. Meanwhile, the stadium hosted its third FA Cup Final, hosting 62,078 spectators for the replay of the 1970 final between Chelsea and Leeds United; Chelsea won the match 2–1. The ground also hosted the second leg of the 1968 Intercontinental Cup, which saw Estudiantes de La Plata win the cup after a 1–1 draw. The 1970s saw the dramatic rise of football hooliganism in Britain, and a knife-throwing incident in 1971 forced the club to erect the country's first perimeter fence, restricting fans from the Old Trafford pitch.

=== Conversion to all-seater ===
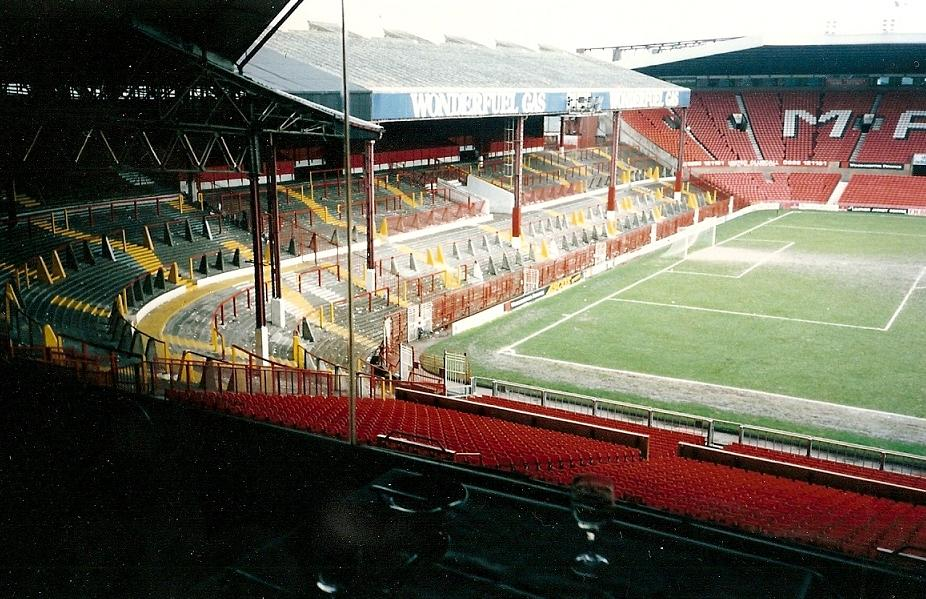
The Stretford End before its redevelopment in the early 1990s

With every subsequent improvement made to the ground since the Second World War, the capacity steadily declined. By the 1980s, the capacity had dropped from the original 80,000 to approximately 60,000. The capacity dropped still further in 1990, when the Taylor Report recommended, and the government demanded that all First and Second Division stadia be converted to all-seaters. This meant that £3–5 million plans to replace the Stretford End with a brand new stand with an all-standing terrace at the front and a cantilever roof to link with the rest of the ground had to be drastically altered. This forced redevelopment, including the removal of the terraces at the front of the other three stands, not only increased the cost to around £10 million, but also reduced the capacity of Old Trafford to an all-time low of around 44,000. In addition, the club was told in 1992 that they would only receive £1.4 million of a possible £2 million from the Football Trust to be put towards work related to the Taylor Report.

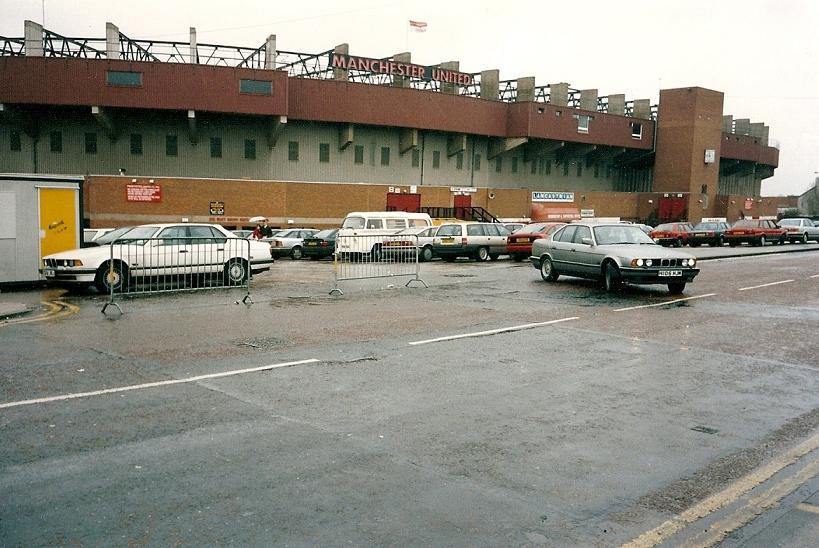
Outside Old Trafford, 1992

The club's resurgence in success and increase in popularity in the early 1990s ensured that further development would have to occur. In 1995, the 30-year-old North Stand was demolished and work quickly began on a new stand, to be ready in time for Old Trafford to host three group games, a quarter-final and a semi-final at Euro 96. The club purchased the Trafford Park trading estate, a 20-acre (8-hectare) site on the other site of United Road, for £9.2 million in March 1995. Construction began in June 1995 and was completed by May 1996, with the first two of the three phases of the stand opening during the season. Designed by Atherden Fuller, with Hilstone Laurie as project and construction managers and Campbell Reith Hill as structural engineers, the new three-tiered stand cost a total of £18.65 million to build and had a capacity of about 25,500, raising the capacity of the entire ground to more than 55,000. The cantilever roof would also be the largest in Europe, measuring 58.5 m (192 ft) from the back wall to the front edge. Further success over the next few years guaranteed yet more development. First, a second tier was added to the East Stand. Opened in January 2000, the stadium's capacity was temporarily increased to about 61,000 until the opening of the West Stand's second tier, which added yet another 7,000 seats, bringing the capacity to 68,217. It was now not only the biggest club stadium in England but the biggest in all of the United Kingdom. Old Trafford hosted its first major European final three years later, playing host to the 2003 UEFA Champions League Final between Milan and Juventus.

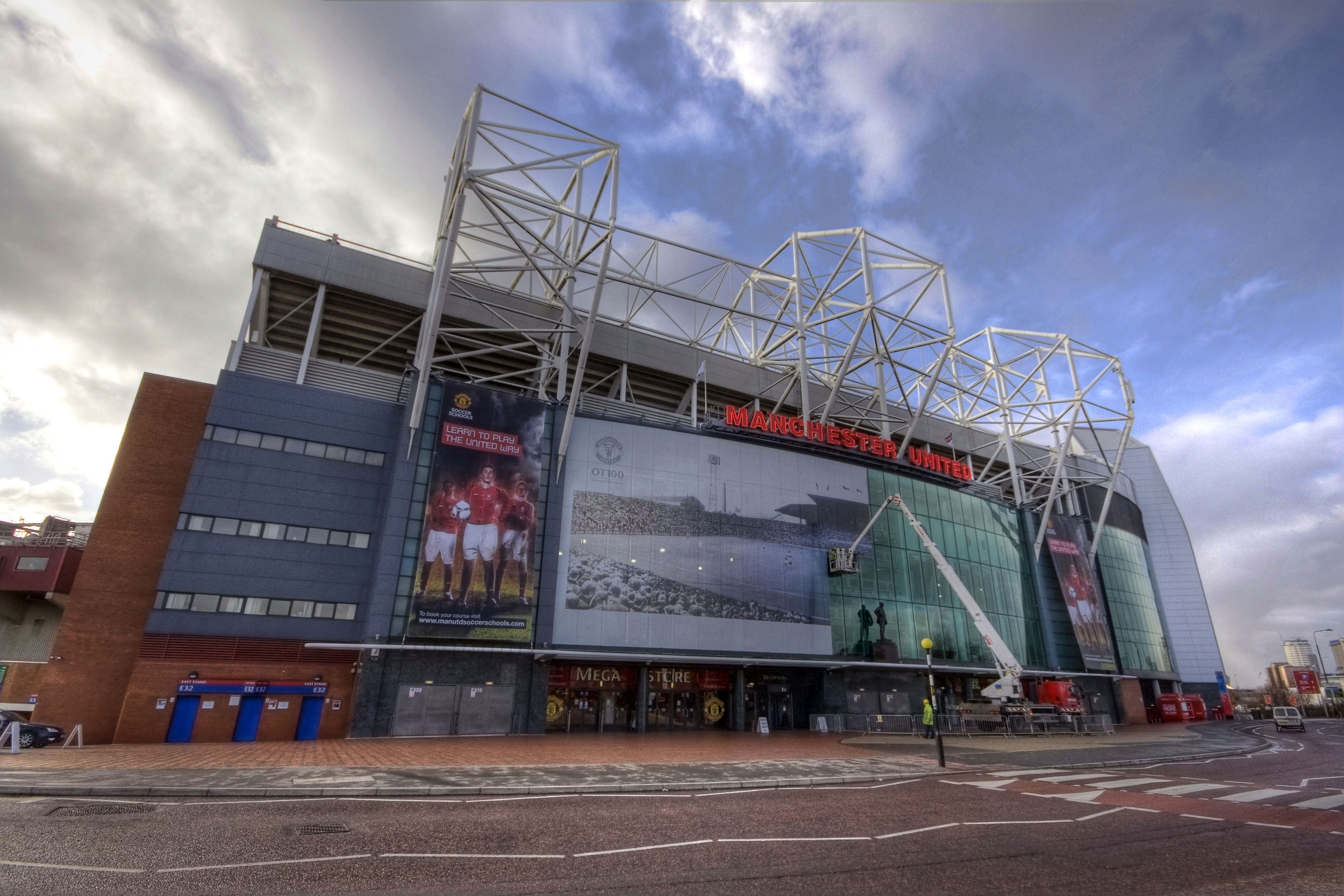
The redeveloped East Stand was opened at the beginning of the 2000–01 season.

From 2001 to 2007, following the demolition of the old Wembley Stadium, the England national football team was forced to play its games elsewhere. During that time, the team toured the country, playing their matches at various grounds from Villa Park in Birmingham to St James' Park in Newcastle. In that period Old Trafford hosted 14 of England's 34 home matches, more than any other stadium, the last of which was England's 1–0 loss to Spain on 7 February 2007. The match was played in front of a crowd of 58,207.

=== 2006 expansion ===
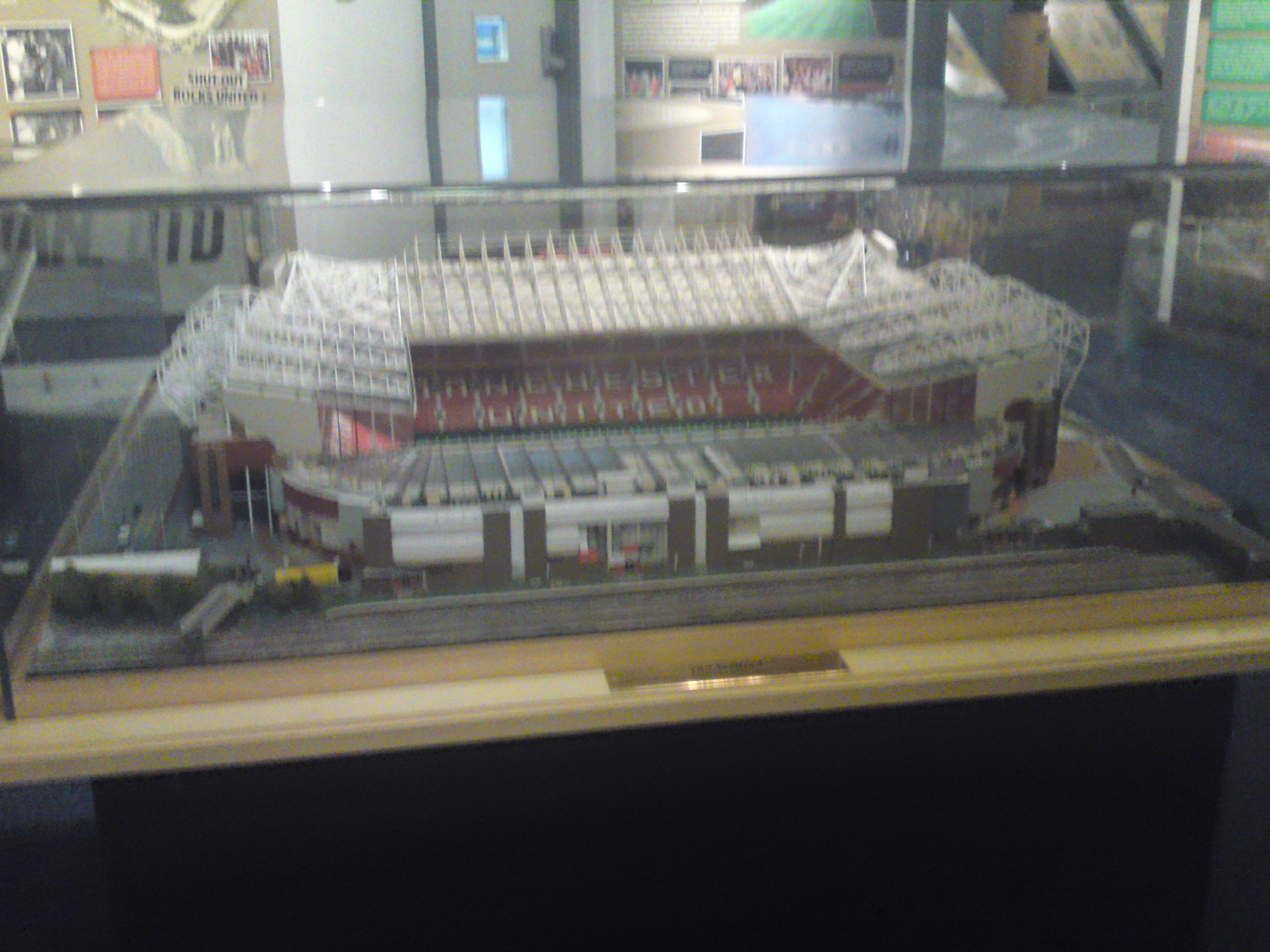
Peter Oldfield-Edwards' scale model of Old Trafford on display in the club museum in March 2010

Old Trafford's most recent expansion, which took place between July 2005 and May 2006, saw an increase of around 8,000 seats with the addition of second tiers to both the north-west and north-east quadrants of the ground. Part of the new seating was used for the first time on 26 March 2006, when an attendance of 69,070 became a new Premier League record. The record continued to be pushed upwards before reaching its current peak on 31 March 2007, when 76,098 spectators saw United beat Blackburn Rovers 4–1, meaning that just 114 seats (0.15% of the total capacity of 76,212) were left unoccupied. In 2009, a reorganisation of the seating in the stadium resulted in a reduction of the capacity by 255 to 75,957, meaning that the club's home attendance record would stand at least until the next expansion.

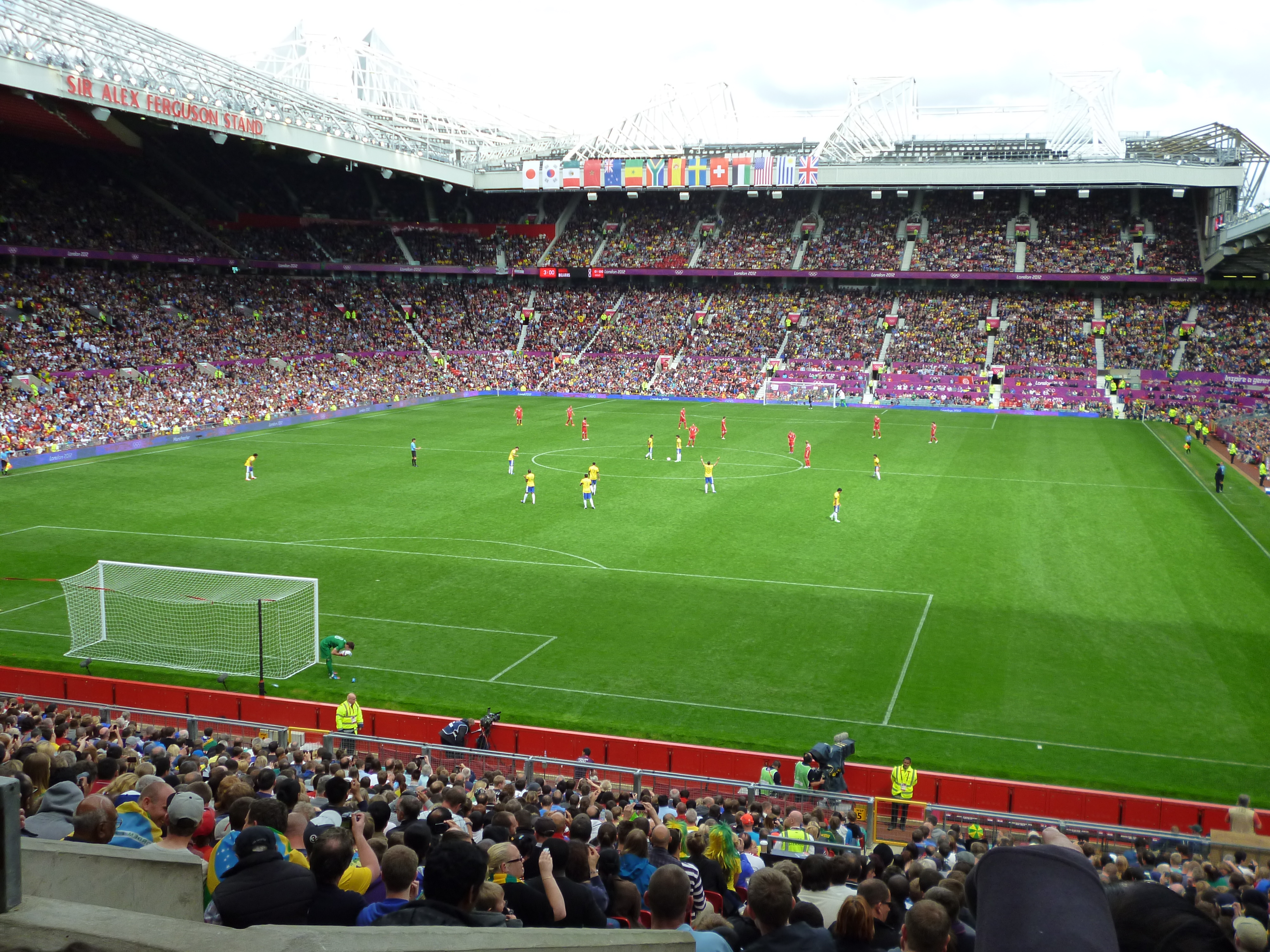
Old Trafford during a match at the 2012 Summer Olympics

Old Trafford celebrated its 100th anniversary on 19 February 2010. In recognition of the occasion, Manchester United's official website ran a feature in which a memorable moment from the stadium's history was highlighted on each of the 100 days leading up to the anniversary. From these 100 moments, the top 10 were chosen by a panel including club statistician Cliff Butler, journalist David Meek, and former players Paddy Crerand and Wilf McGuinness. At Old Trafford itself, an art competition was run for pupils from three local schools to create their own depictions of the stadium in the past, present and future. Winning paintings were put on permanent display on the concourse of the Old Trafford family stand, and the winners were presented with awards by artist Harold Riley on 22 February. An exhibition about the stadium at the club museum was opened by former goalkeeper Jack Crompton and chief executive David Gill on 19 February. The exhibition highlighted the history of the stadium and features memorabilia from its past, including a programme from the inaugural match and a 1:220 scale model hand-built by model artist Peter Oldfield-Edwards. Finally, at Manchester United's home match against Fulham on 14 March, fans at the game received a replica copy of the programme from the first Old Trafford match, and half-time saw relatives of the players who took part in the first game – as well as those of the club chairman John Henry Davies and stadium architect Archibald Leitch – taking part in the burial of a time capsule of Manchester United memorabilia near the centre tunnel. Only relatives of winger Billy Meredith, wing-half Dick Duckworth and club secretary Ernest Mangnall could not be found.

Old Trafford was used as a venue for several matches in the football competition at the 2012 Summer Olympics. The stadium hosted five group games, a quarter-final and semi-final in the men's tournament, and one group game and a famous semi-final in the women's tournament, the first women's international matches to be played there. Since 2006, Old Trafford has also been used as the venue for Soccer Aid, a biennial charity match initially organised by singer Robbie Williams and actor Jonathan Wilkes; however, in 2008, the match was played at Wembley Stadium.

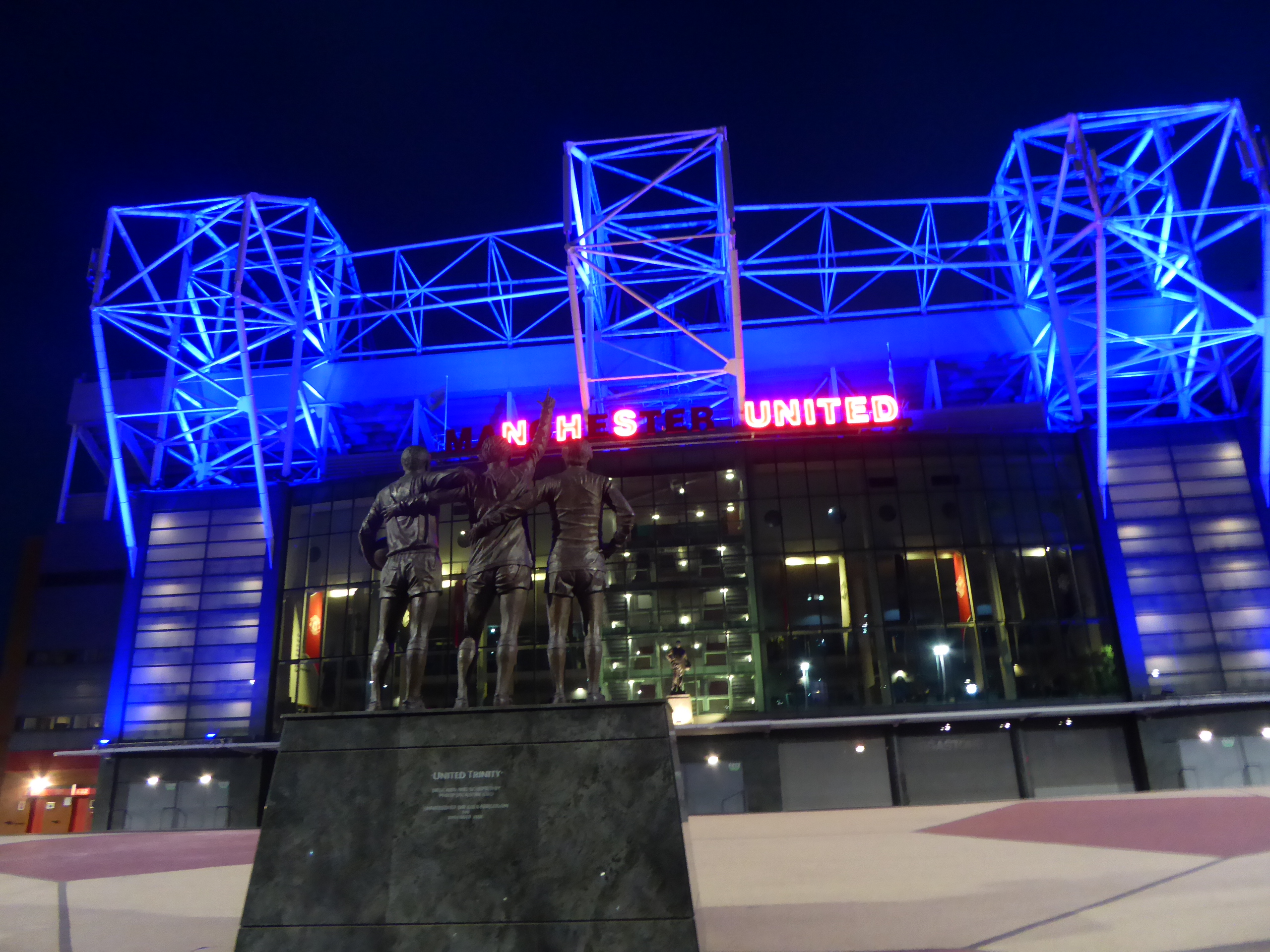
Old Trafford's tribute to the National Health Service during the COVID-19 pandemic

On 27 March 2021, Old Trafford hosted its first game of the Manchester United women's team, with West Ham United as the opposition in the Women's Super League. Exactly one year on, Manchester United's women's team faced Everton at Old Trafford in front of a crowd for the first time (the 2021 game was behind closed doors due to the COVID-19 pandemic). A crowd of 20,241 attended the match, marking the highest home attendance of the women's team, and saw Manchester United come out with a 3–1 victory.

On 6 July 2022, Old Trafford hosted the opening match of UEFA Women's Euro 2022 between England and Austria, in front of a record attendance for the Women's European Championships of 68,871 – the second highest women's football attendance in the United Kingdom.

In 2022, Old Trafford was included in the shortlist of stadiums for the United Kingdom and Ireland's bid to host UEFA Euro 2028, but was excluded from the final list of 10, announced in April 2023. On 19 June 2023, the England men's team returned to Old Trafford for the first time since 2007 for a Euro 2024 qualifying match against North Macedonia; England won 7–0 in front of 70,708 people.

== Structure and facilities ==
A plan of the layout of Old Trafford. The shaded area indicates the section designated for away fans.

The Old Trafford pitch is surrounded by four covered all-seater stands, officially known as the Sir Alex Ferguson (North), East, Sir Bobby Charlton (South) and West Stands. Each stand has at least two tiers, with the exception of the Sir Bobby Charlton Stand, which only has one tier due to construction restrictions. The bottom tier of each stand is split into Lower and Upper sections, the Lower sections having been converted from terracing in the early 1990s.

=== Sir Alex Ferguson Stand ===
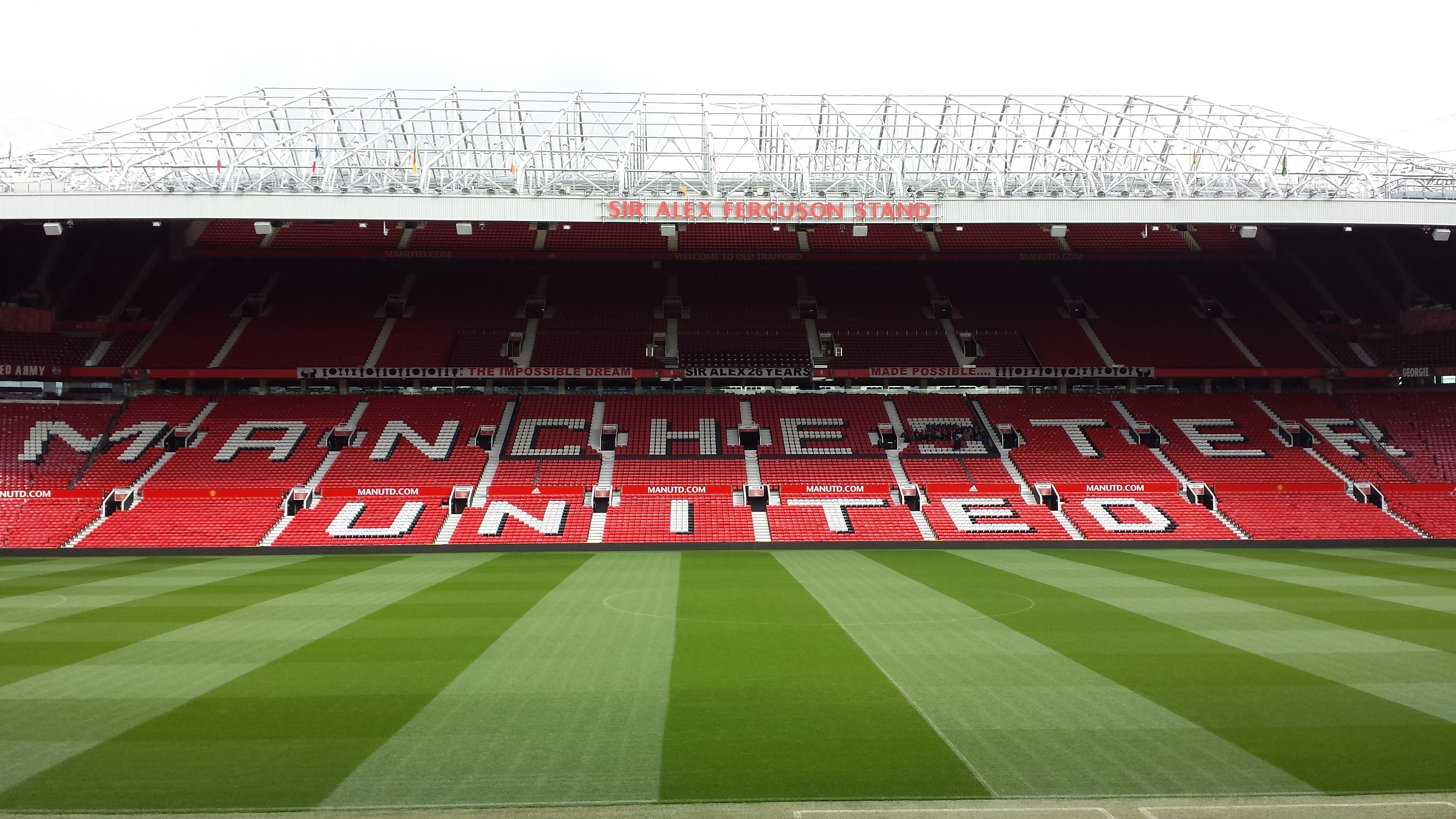
The Sir Alex Ferguson Stand (North Stand) seen from the Sir Bobby Charlton Stand (South Stand)

The Sir Alex Ferguson Stand, formerly known as the United Road stand and the North Stand, runs over the top of United Road. The stand is three tiers tall, and can hold about 26,000 spectators, the most of the four stands. It can also accommodate a few fans in executive boxes and hospitality suites. It opened in its current state in 1996, having previously been a single-tiered stand. As the ground's largest stand, it houses many of the ground's more popular facilities, including the Red Café (a Manchester United theme restaurant/bar) and the Manchester United museum and trophy room. Originally opened in 1986 as the first of its kind in the world, the Manchester United museum was in the south-east corner of the ground until it moved to the redeveloped North Stand in 1998. The museum was opened by Pelé on 11 April 1998, since when numbers of visitors have jumped from 192,000 in 1998 to more than 300,000 visitors in 2009. Visitation had fallen to approximately 190,000 as of 2022-23.

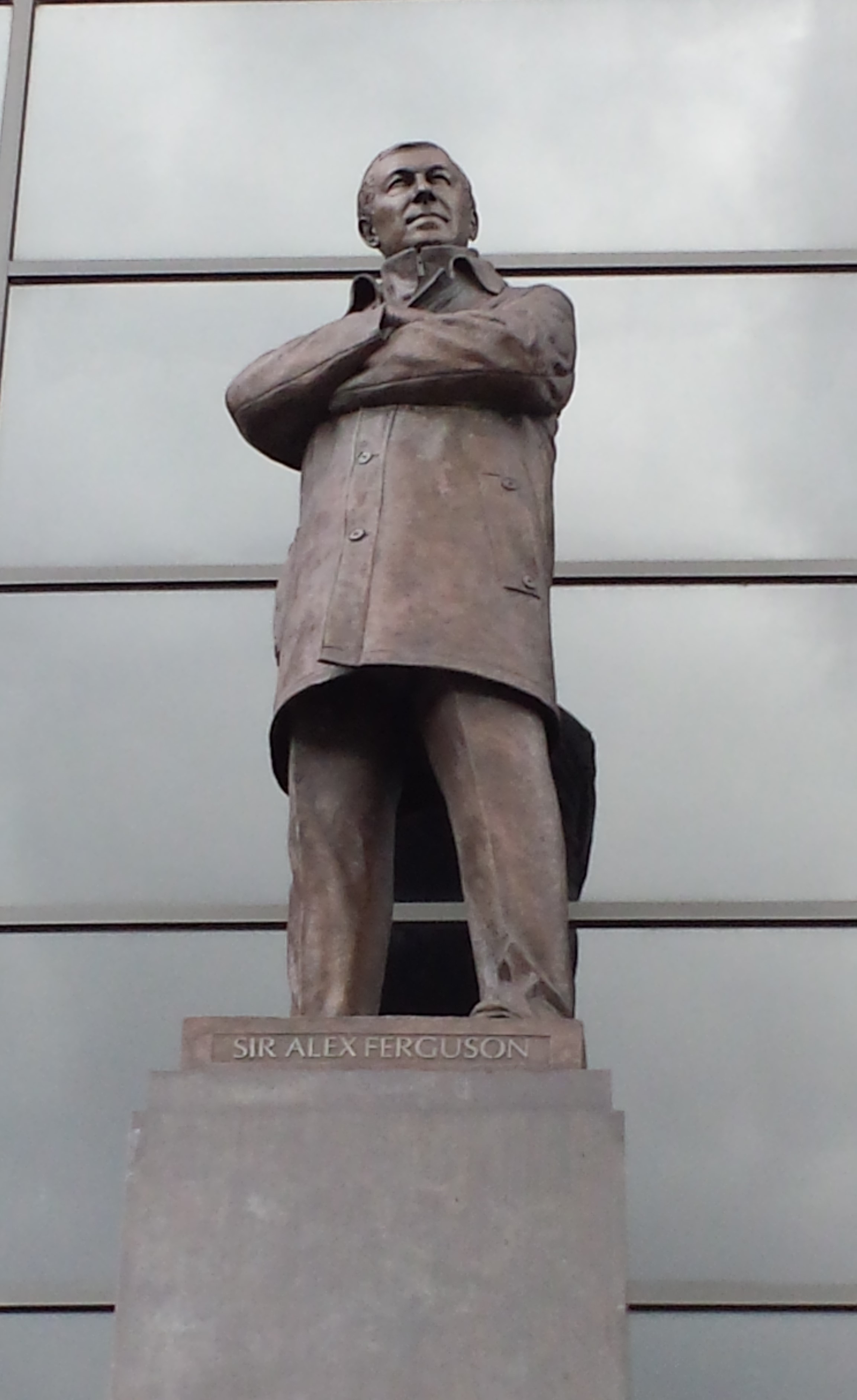
A statue of Alex Ferguson was installed at Old Trafford on 23 November 2012.

The North Stand was renamed as the Sir Alex Ferguson Stand on 5 November 2011, in honour of Alex Ferguson's 25 years as manager of the club. A nine-foot (2.7-metre) statue of Ferguson, sculpted by Philip Jackson, was erected outside the stand on 23 November 2012 in recognition of his status as Manchester United's longest-serving manager.

=== Sir Bobby Charlton Stand ===
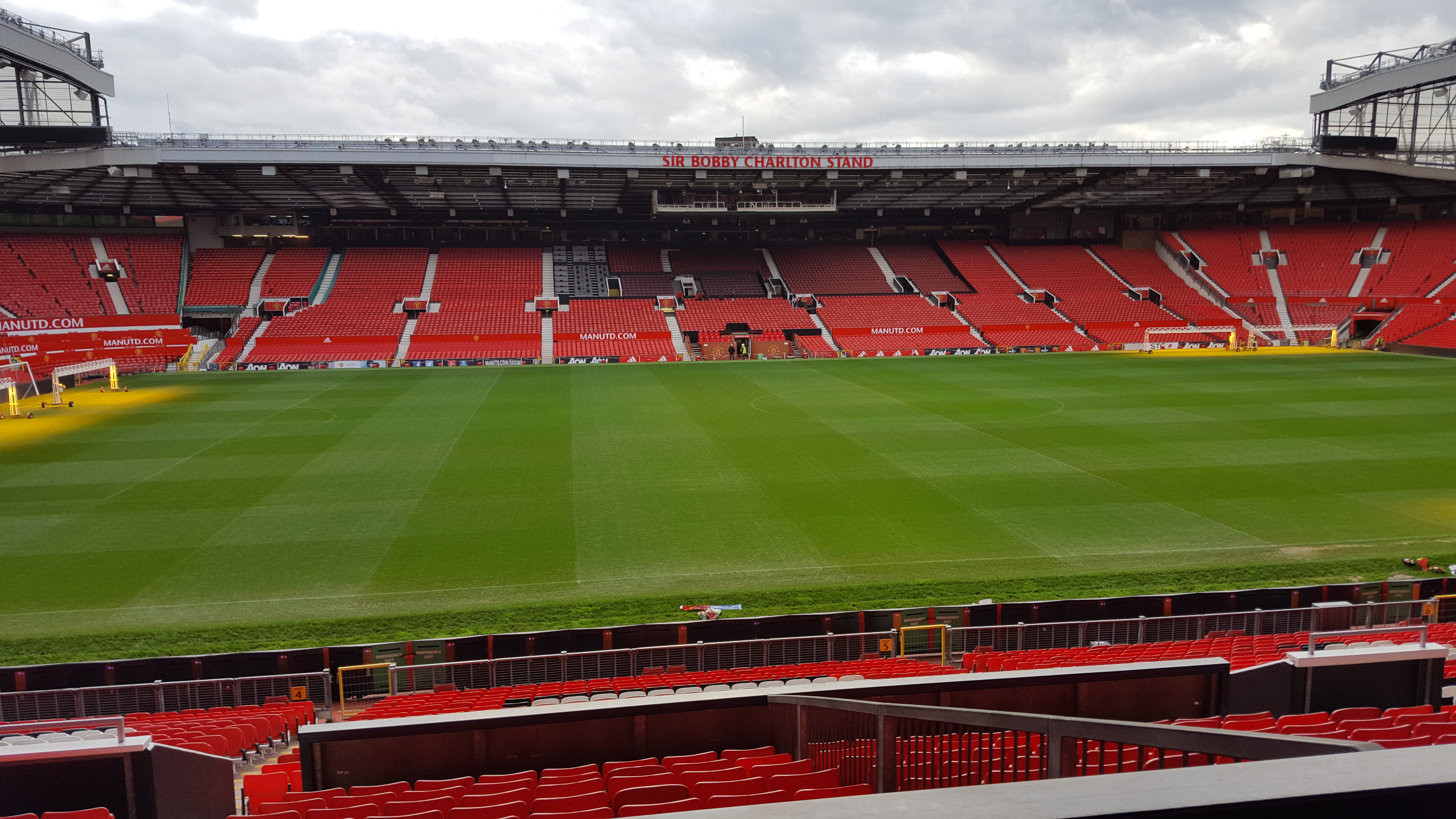
The Sir Bobby Charlton Stand (South Stand) seen from the Sir Alex Ferguson Stand (North Stand)

Opposite the Sir Alex Ferguson Stand is the Sir Bobby Charlton Stand, formerly Old Trafford's main stand and previously known as the South Stand. Although only a single-tiered stand, the Sir Bobby Charlton Stand contains most of the ground's executive suites, and also plays host to any VIPs who may come to watch the match. Members of the media are seated in the middle of the Upper South Stand to give them the best view of the match. The television gantry is also in the Sir Bobby Charlton Stand, so the Sir Bobby Charlton Stand is the one that gets shown on television least often. Television studios are located at either end of the Sir Bobby Charlton Stand, with the club's in-house television station, MUTV, in the East studio and other television stations, such as the BBC and Sky, in the West studio.

The dugout is in the centre of the Sir Bobby Charlton Stand, raised above pitch level to give the manager and his coaches an elevated view of the game. Each team's dugout flanks the old players' tunnel, which was used until 1993. The old tunnel is the only remaining part of the original 1910 stadium, having survived the bombing that destroyed much of the stadium during the Second World War. On 6 February 2008, the tunnel was renamed the Munich Tunnel, as a memorial for the 50th anniversary of the 1958 Munich air disaster. The current tunnel is in the South-West corner of the ground, and doubles as an entrance for the emergency services. If large vehicles require access, then the seating above the tunnel can be raised by up to 25 feet (7.6 m). The tunnel leads up to the players' dressing room, via the television interview area, and the players' lounge. Both the home and away dressing rooms were re-furbished for the 2018–19 season, and the corridor leading to the two was widened and separated to keep the opposing teams apart.

On 3 April 2016, the South Stand was renamed the Sir Bobby Charlton Stand before kick-off of the Premier League home match against Everton, in honour of former Manchester United player Bobby Charlton, who made his Manchester United debut 60 years earlier.

=== West Stand ===
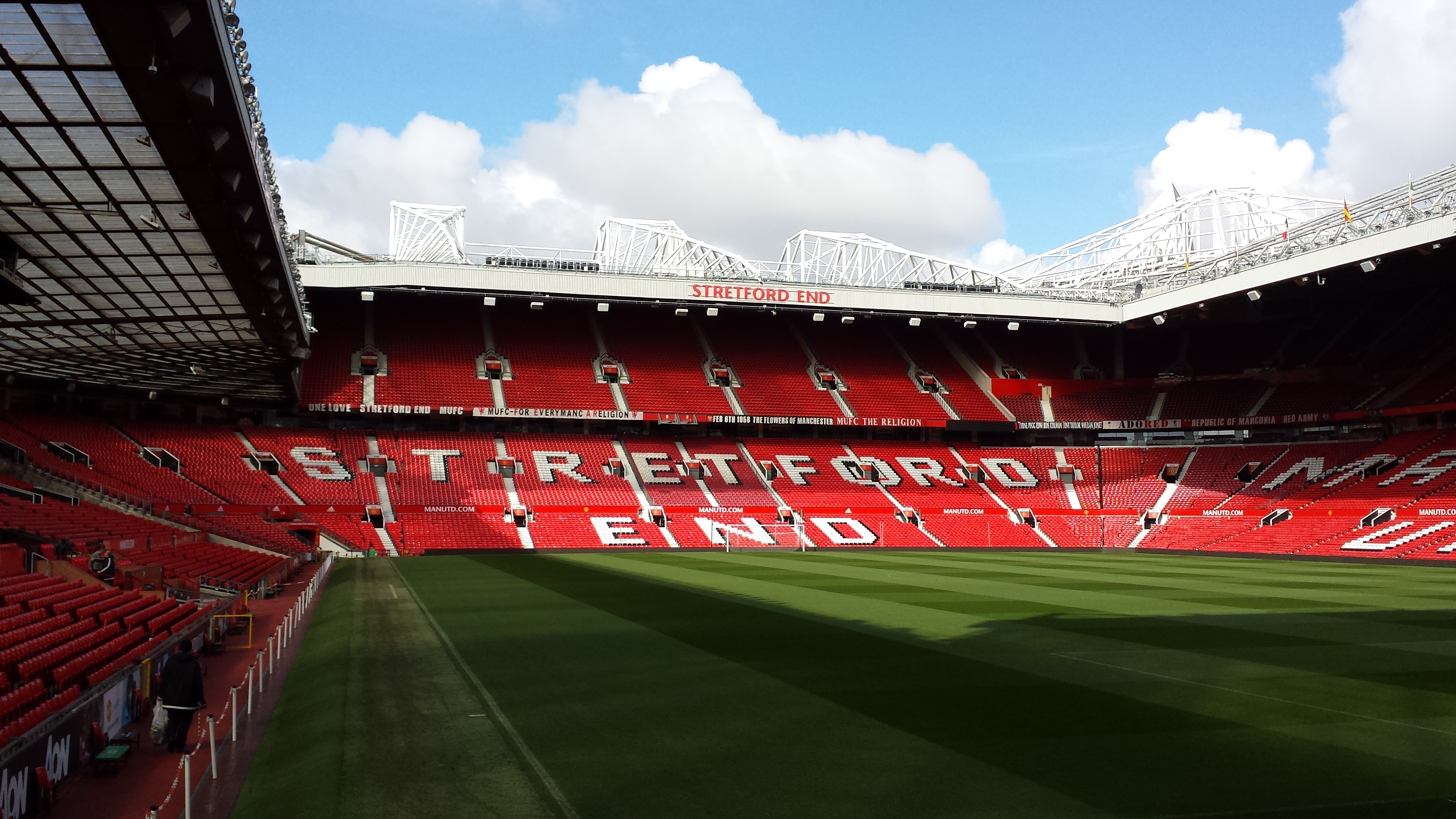
The West Stand, with its mosaic of seats displaying the stand's colloquial name

Perhaps the best-known stand at Old Trafford is the West Stand, also known as the Stretford End. Traditionally, the stand is where the hard-core United fans are located, and also the ones who make the most noise. Originally designed to hold 20,000 fans, the Stretford End was the last stand to be covered and also the last remaining all-terraced stand at the ground before the forced upgrade to seating in the early 1990s. The reconstruction of the Stretford End, which took place during the 1992–93 season, was carried out by Alfred McAlpine. When the second tier was added to the Stretford End in 2000, many fans from the old "K Stand" moved there, and decided to hang banners and flags from the barrier at the front of the tier. So ingrained in Manchester United culture is the Stretford End, that Denis Law was given the nickname "King of the Stretford End", and there is now a statue of Law on the concourse of the stand's upper tier.

=== East Stand ===
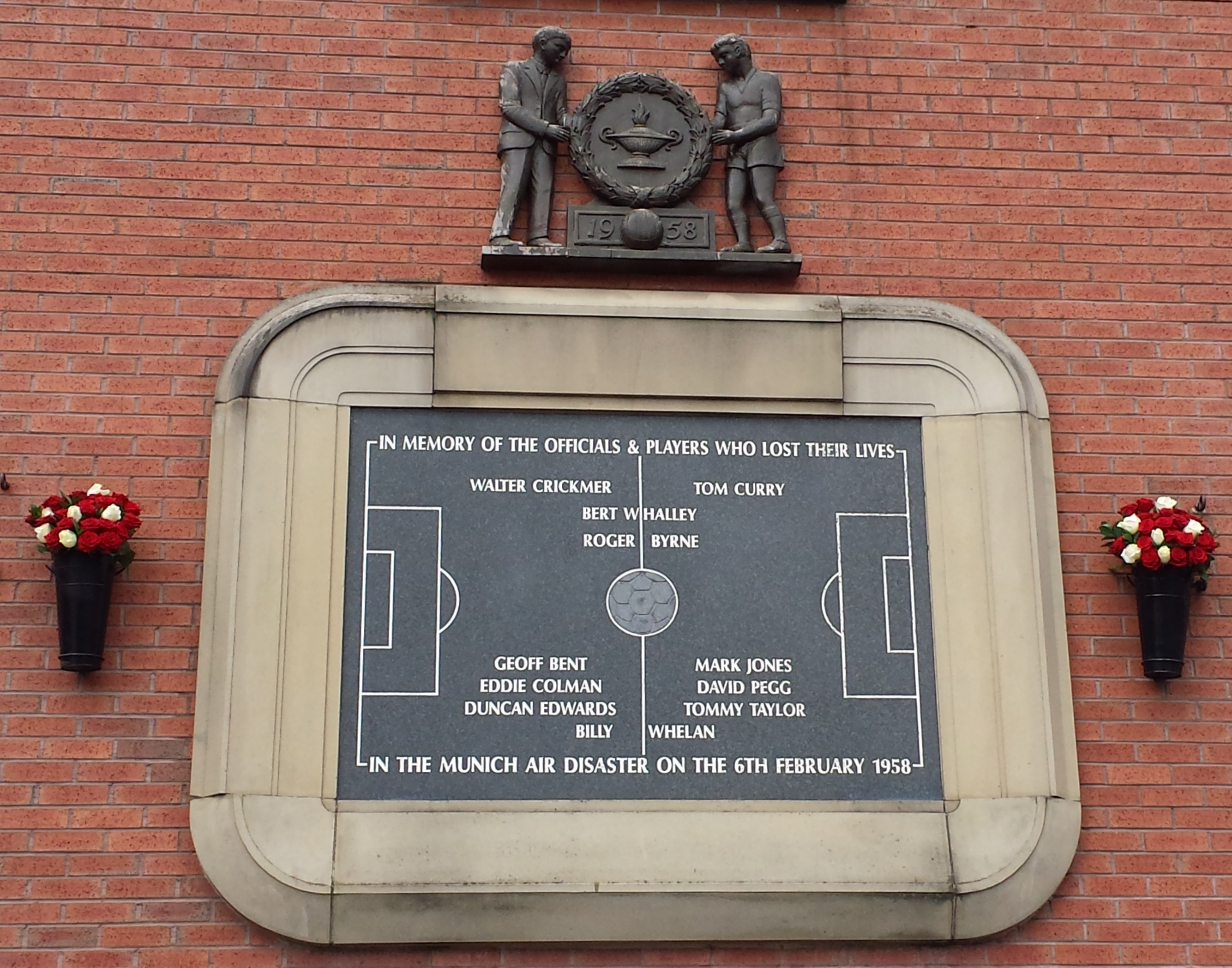
A plaque at Old Trafford honouring the victims of the Munich air disaster

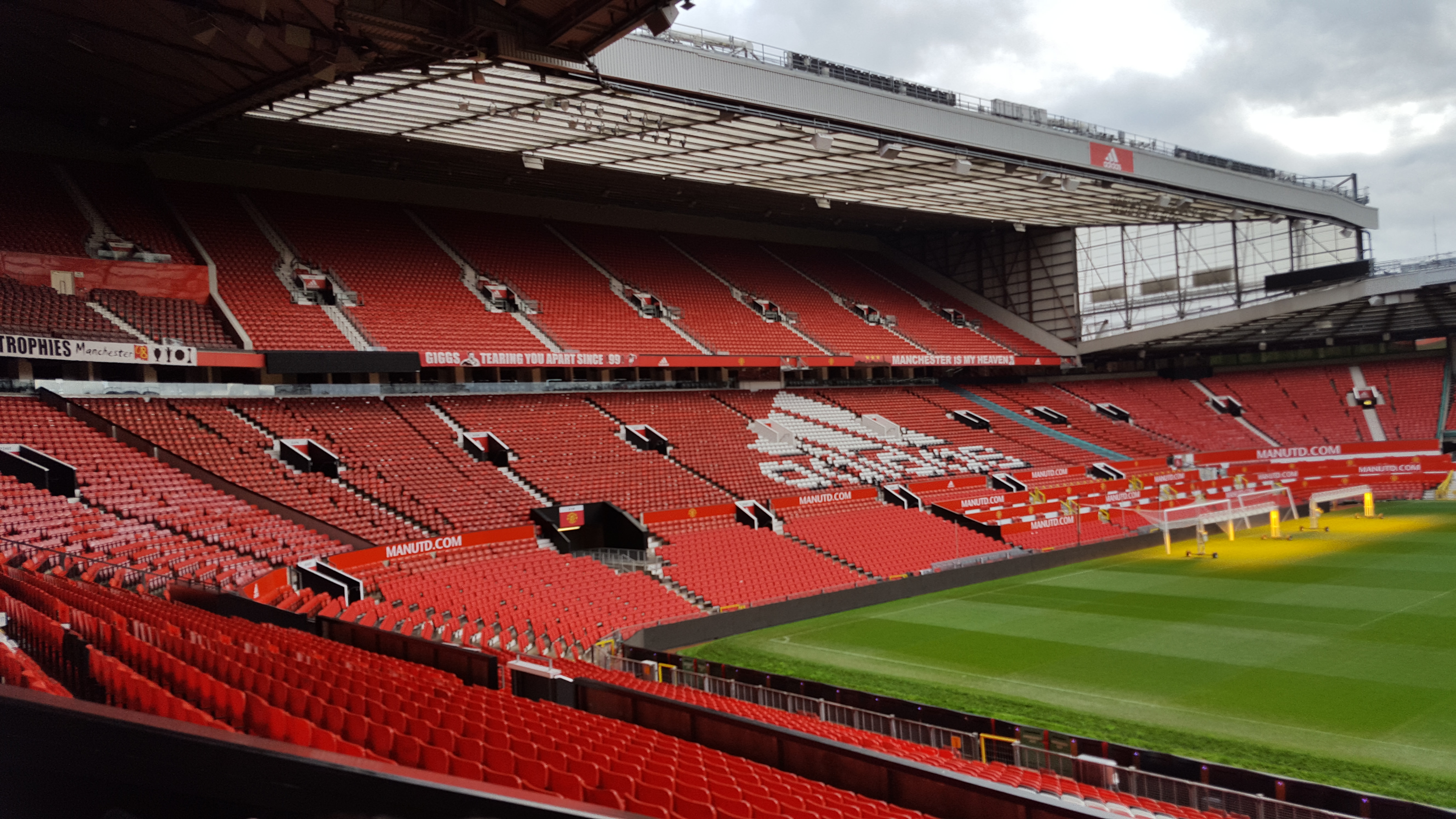
The East Stand as seen from the Sir Alex Ferguson Stand (North Stand)

The East Stand at Old Trafford was the second to be converted to a cantilever roof, following the Sir Alex Ferguson Stand. It is also commonly referred to as the Scoreboard End, as it was the location of the scoreboard. The East Stand can currently hold nearly 12,000 fans, and is the location of both the disabled fans section and the away section; an experiment involving the relocation of away fans to the third tier of the Sir Alex Ferguson Stand was conducted during the 2011–12 season, but the results of the experiments could not be ascertained in time to make the move permanent for the 2012–13 season. The disabled section provides for up to 170 fans, with free seats for carers. Old Trafford was formerly divided into sections, with each section sequentially assigned a letter of the alphabet. Although every section had a letter, it is the K Stand that is the most commonly referred to today. The K Stand fans were renowned for their vocal support for the club, and a large array of chants and songs, though many of them have relocated to the second tier of the Stretford End.

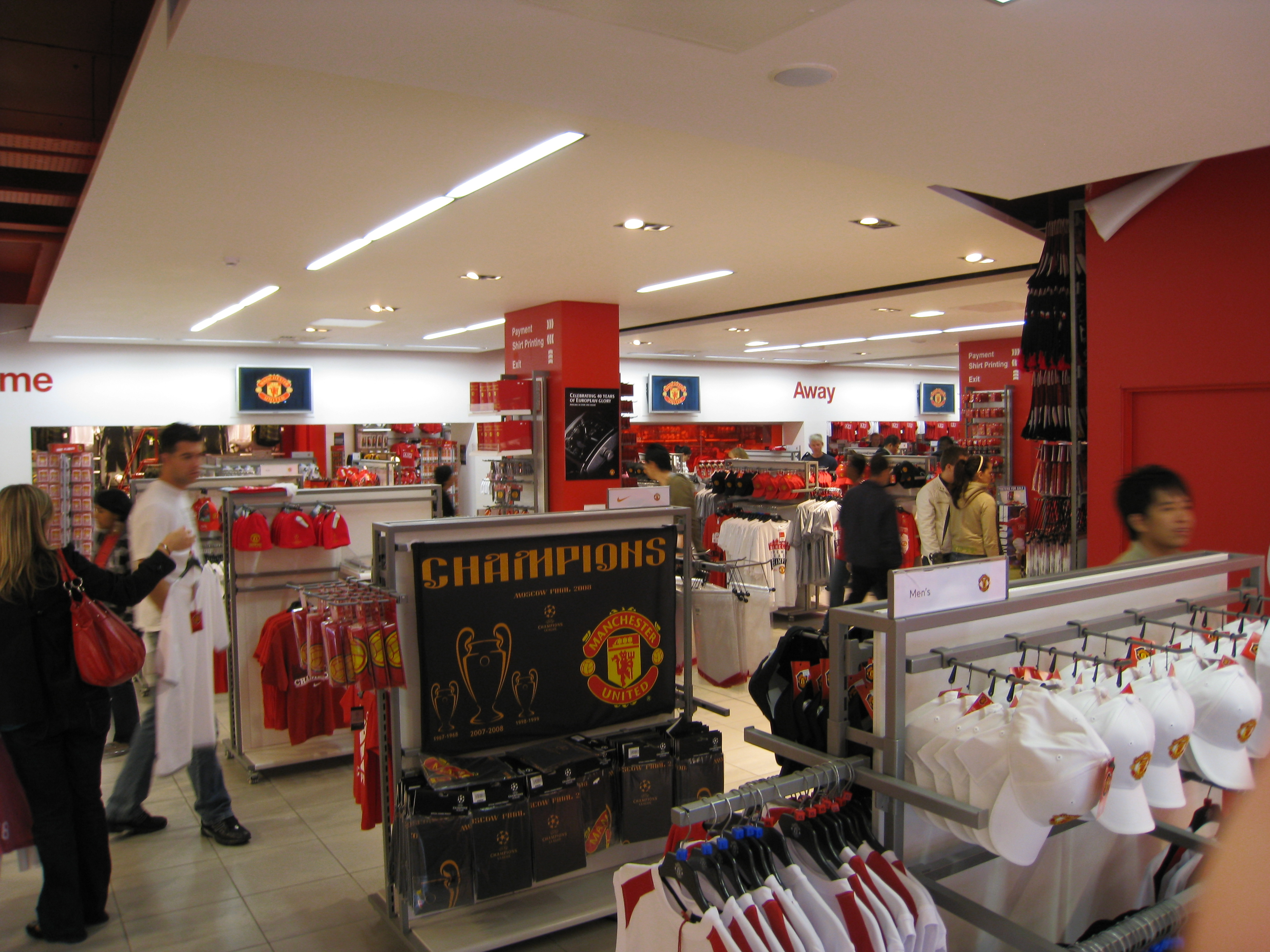
Manchester United's megastore is located on the East Stand of Old Trafford

The East Stand has a tinted glass façade, behind which the club's administrative centre is located. These offices are the home to the staff of Inside United, the official Manchester United magazine, the club's official website, and its other administrative departments. Images and advertisements are often emblazoned on the front of the East Stand, most often advertising products and services provided by the club's sponsors, though a tribute to the Busby Babes was displayed in February 2008 to commemorate the 50th anniversary of the Munich air disaster. Above the megastore is a statue of Matt Busby, who was Manchester United's longest-serving manager until he was surpassed by Alex Ferguson in 2010. There is also a plaque dedicated to the victims of the Munich air disaster on the south end of the East Stand, while the Munich Clock is at the junction of the East and South Stands. On 29 May 2008, to celebrate the 40th anniversary of Manchester United's first European Cup title, a statue of the club's "holy trinity" of George Best, Denis Law and Bobby Charlton, entitled "The United Trinity", was unveiled across Sir Matt Busby Way from the East Stand, directly opposite the statue of Busby.

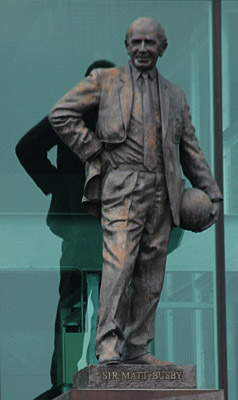
The statue of Matt Busby overlooking the East Stand forecourt

The Manchester United club shop has had six different locations since it was first opened. Originally, the shop was a small hut near to the railway line that runs alongside the ground. The shop was then moved along the length of the South Stand, stopping first opposite where away fans enter the ground, and then residing in the building that would later become the club's merchandising office. A surge in the club's popularity in the early 1990s led to another move, this time to the forecourt of the West Stand. With this move came a great expansion and the conversion from a small shop to a "megastore". Alex Ferguson opened the new megastore on 3 December 1994. The most recent moves came in the late 1990s, as the West Stand required room to expand to a second tier, and that meant the demolition of the megastore. The store was moved to a temporary site opposite the East Stand, before taking up a 17,000-square-foot (1,600 m^{2}) permanent residence in the ground floor of the expanded East Stand in 2000. The floor space of the megastore was owned by United's kit sponsors, Nike, who operated the store until the expiry of their sponsorship deal at the end of July 2015, when ownership reverted to the club.

=== Pitch and surroundings ===
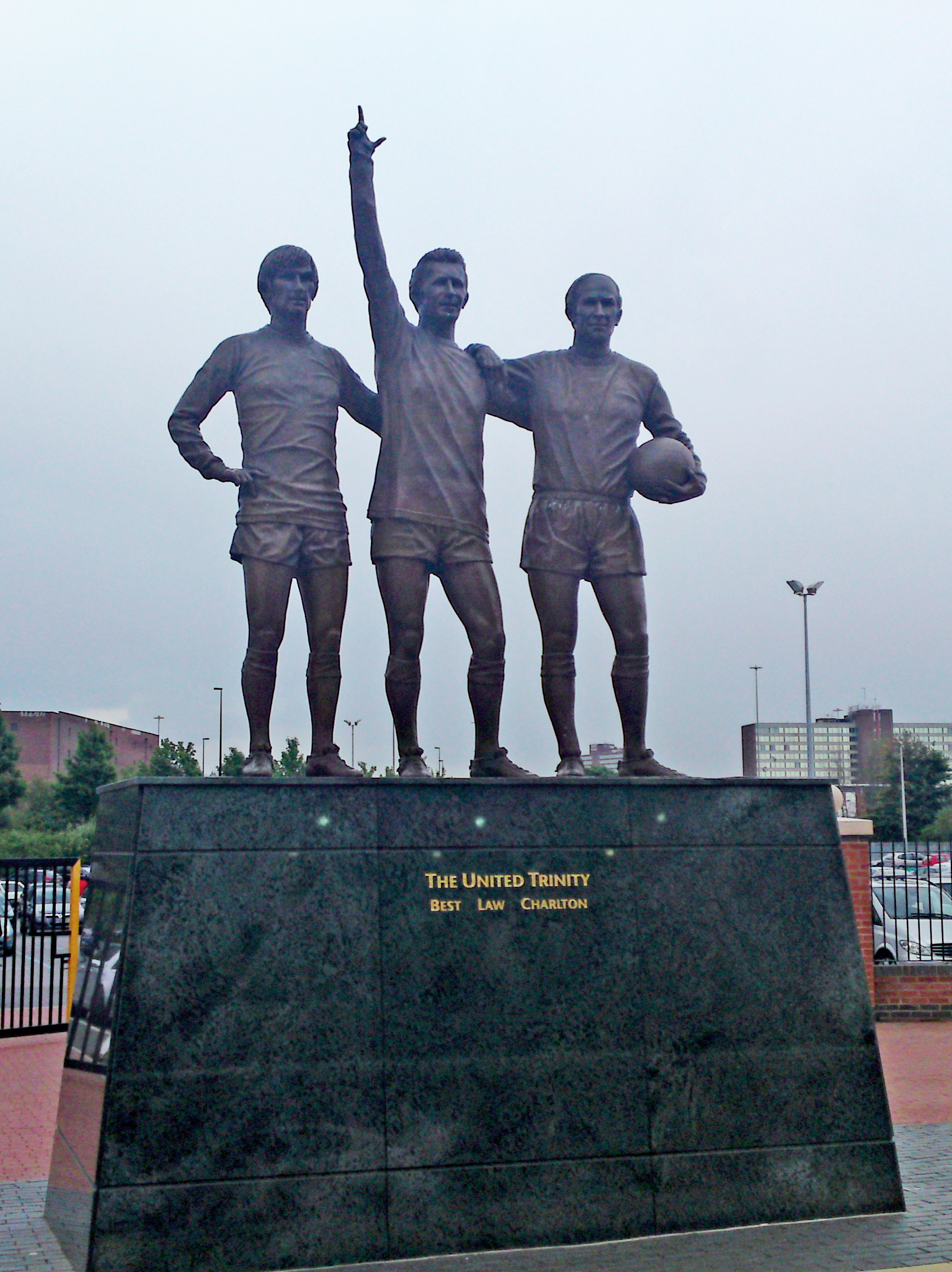
The United Trinity, a statue of Manchester United's "holy trinity" of George Best, Denis Law and Bobby Charlton

The pitch at the ground measures approximately 105 metres (115 yd) long by 68 metres (74 yd) wide, with a few metres of run-off space on each side. The centre of the pitch is about nine inches higher than the edges, allowing surface water to run off more easily. As at many modern grounds, 10 inches (25 cm) under the pitch is an underground heating system, composed of 23 miles (37 km) of plastic pipes. Former club manager Alex Ferguson often requested that the pitch be relaid, most notably half-way through the 1998–99 season, when the team won the Treble, at a cost of about £250,000 each time. The grass at Old Trafford is watered regularly, though less on wet days, and mowed three times a week between April and November, and once a week from November to March.

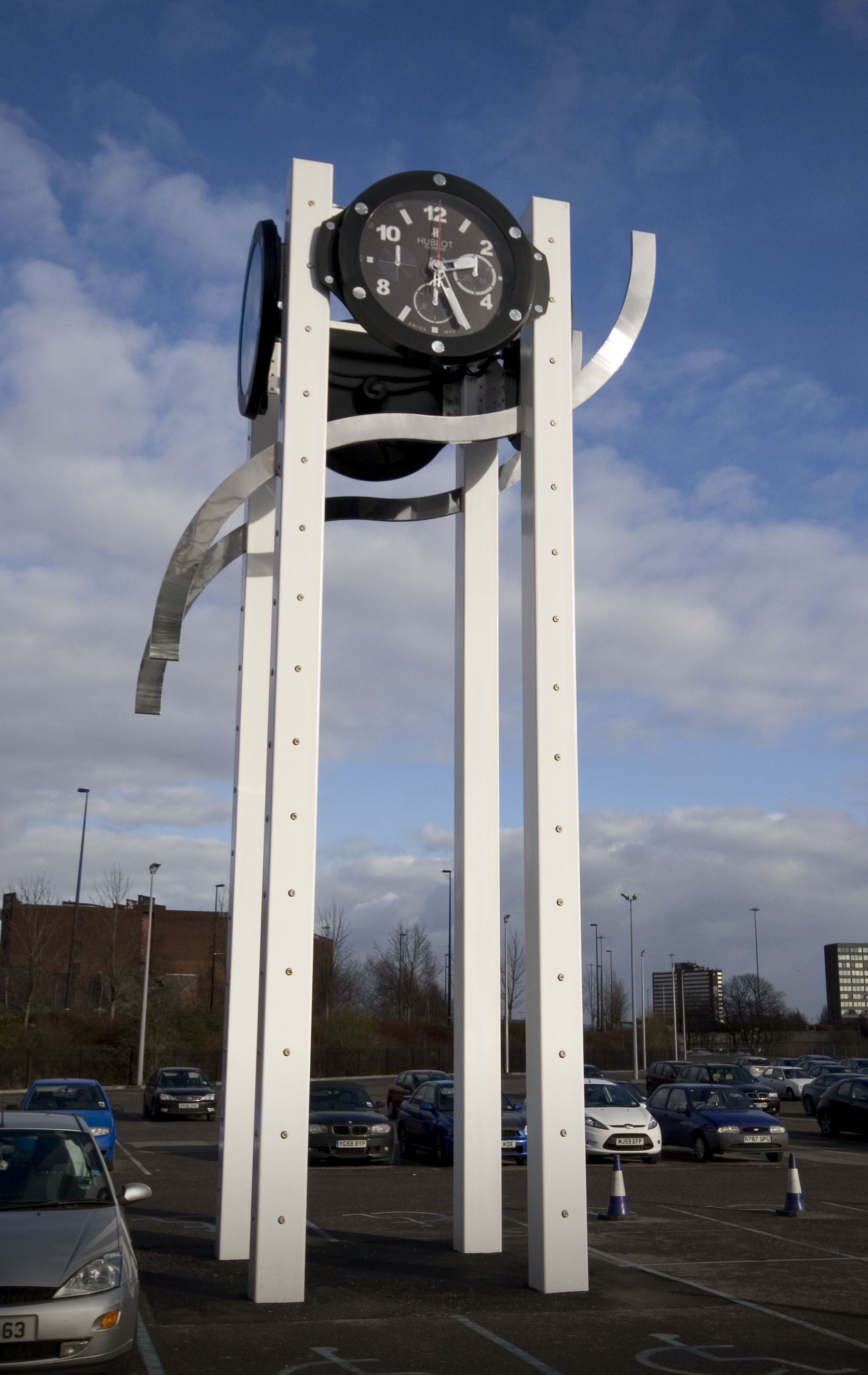
The Hublot clock tower in Old Trafford's car park E1

In the mid-1980s, when Manchester United Football Club owned the Manchester Giants, Manchester's basketball franchise, there were plans to build a 9,000-seater indoor arena on the site of what is now Car Park E1. However, the chairman at the time, Martin Edwards, did not have the funds to take on such a project, and the basketball franchise was eventually sold. In August 2009, the car park became home to the Hublot clock tower, a 10-metre-tall (33 ft) tower in the shape of the Hublot logo, which houses four two-metre-diameter (6 1/2 ft) clock faces, the largest ever made by the company.

The east side of the stadium is also the site of Hotel Football, a football-themed hotel and fan clubhouse conceived by former Manchester United captain Gary Neville. The building is located on the east side of Sir Matt Busby Way and on the opposite side of the Bridgewater Canal from the stadium, and can accommodate up to 1,500 supporters. It opened in the summer of 2015. The venture is conducted separately from the club and was funded in part by proceeds from Neville's testimonial match.

== Future ==
In 2009, it was reported that United continued to harbour plans to increase the capacity of the stadium further, with the next stage pointing to a redevelopment of the Sir Bobby Charlton Stand, which, unlike the rest of the stadium, remains single tier. A replication of the Sir Alex Ferguson Stand development and North-East and North-West Quadrants would see the stadium's capacity rise to an estimated 95,000, which would give it a greater capacity than Wembley Stadium (90,000). Any such development is likely to cost around £100 million, due to the proximity of the railway line that runs adjacent to the stadium, and the corresponding need to build over it and thus purchase up to 50 houses on the other side of the railway. Nevertheless, the Manchester United group property manager confirmed that expansion plans are in the pipeline – linked to profits made from the club's property holdings around Manchester – saying "There is a strategic plan for the stadium ... It is not our intention to stand still".

In March 2016 (ten years after the previous redevelopment), talk of the redevelopment of the Sir Bobby Charlton Stand re-emerged. In order to meet accessibility standards at the stadium, an £11 million investment was made into upgrading its facilities, creating 118 new wheelchair positions and 158 new amenity seats in various areas around the stadium, as well as a new purpose-built concourse at the back of the Stretford End. Increasing capacity for disabled supporters is estimated to reduce overall capacity by around 3,000. To mitigate the reduction in capacity, various expansion plans have been considered, such as adding a second tier to the Sir Bobby Charlton Stand, bringing it to a similar height to the Sir Alex Ferguson Stand opposite but without a third level and increasing capacity to around 80,000. Replication of the corner stands on the other side of the stadium would further increase its capacity to 88,000 and increase the number of executive facilities. Housing on Railway Road and the railway line itself have previously impeded improvements to the Sir Bobby Charlton Stand, but the demolition of housing and engineering advances mean that the additional tier could now be built at reduced cost.

In 2018, it was reported that plans were on hold due to logistical issues. The extent of the work required means that any redevelopment is likely to be a multi-season project, due to the need to locate heavy machinery in areas of the stadium currently inaccessible or occupied by fans during match days and the fact that the stand currently holds the changing rooms, press boxes and TV studios. Club managing director Richard Arnold has said that "it isn't certain that there's a way of doing it which doesn't render us homeless." This would mean that Manchester United would have to leave Old Trafford for the duration of the works – and while Tottenham Hotspur were able to use the neutral Wembley Stadium for two seasons while their own new stadium was built, the only stadia of comparable size anywhere near Old Trafford are local rivals Manchester City's City of Manchester Stadium, or possibly Anfield, home of historic rivals Liverpool, neither of which are considered viable.

In 2021 United co-chairman Joel Glazer said at a Fans Forum meeting that "early-stage planning work" for the redevelopment of Old Trafford and the club's Carrington training ground was underway. This followed "increasing criticism" over the lack of development of the ground since 2006. The club is considering tearing down the current stadium and building an entirely new one on the same site, but this is believed to be the "least likely choice". In 2024, it was reported that 25 percent Manchester United shareholder Jim Ratcliffe wants to demolish Old Trafford and build a "Wembley of the North" on the same site, potentially being funded by the government's Levelling Up programme. On 11 March 2025, Manchester United confirmed their plans to replace Old Trafford with a new 100,000 seat stadium designed by Foster and Partners as part of a large scale redevelopment of the area.

== Other uses ==
=== Rugby league ===
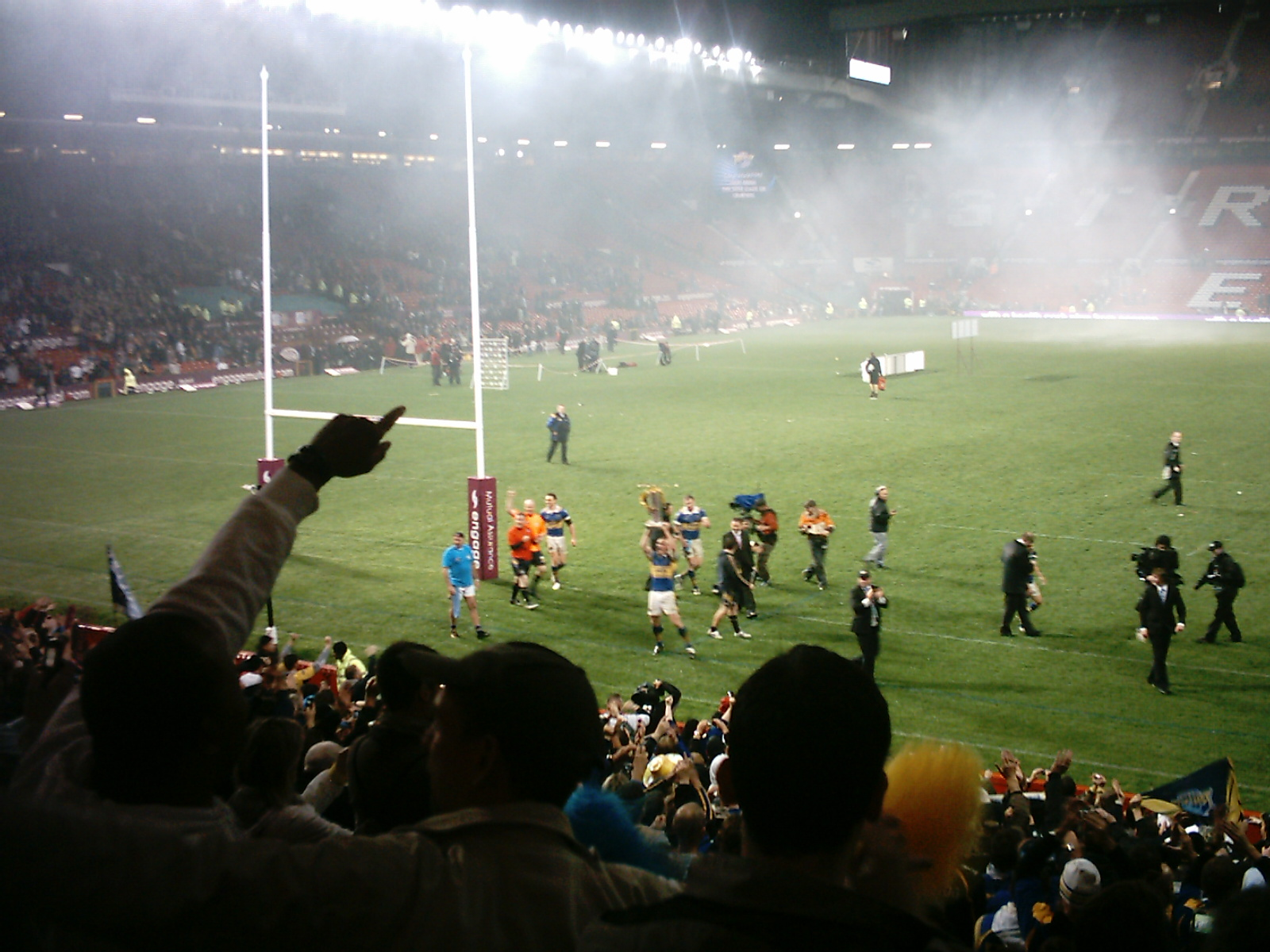
Leeds Rhinos celebrate their 2008 Super League Grand Final victory over St Helens.

Old Trafford has played host to both codes of rugby football, although league is played there with greater regularity than union. Old Trafford has hosted every Rugby League Premiership Final since the 1986–87 season, in addition to the competition's successor, the Super League Grand Final from 1998.

The first league match to be held at Old Trafford came in November 1958, with Salford playing against Leeds under floodlights in front of 8,000 spectators.

The first rugby league Test match played at Old Trafford came in 1986, when Australia beat Great Britain 38–16 in front of 50,583 in the first test of the 1986 Kangaroo tour. The 1989 World Club Challenge was played at Old Trafford on 4 October 1989, with 30,768 spectators watching Widnes beat the Canberra Raiders 30–18. Old Trafford also hosted the second Great Britain vs Australia Ashes tests on both the 1990 and 1994 Kangaroo Tours. The stadium also hosted the semi-final between England and Wales at the 1995 Rugby League World Cup; England won 25–10 in front of 30,042. The final rugby league international played at Old Trafford in the 1990s saw Great Britain record their only win over Australia at the ground in 1997 in the second test of the Super League Test series in front of 40,324 fans.

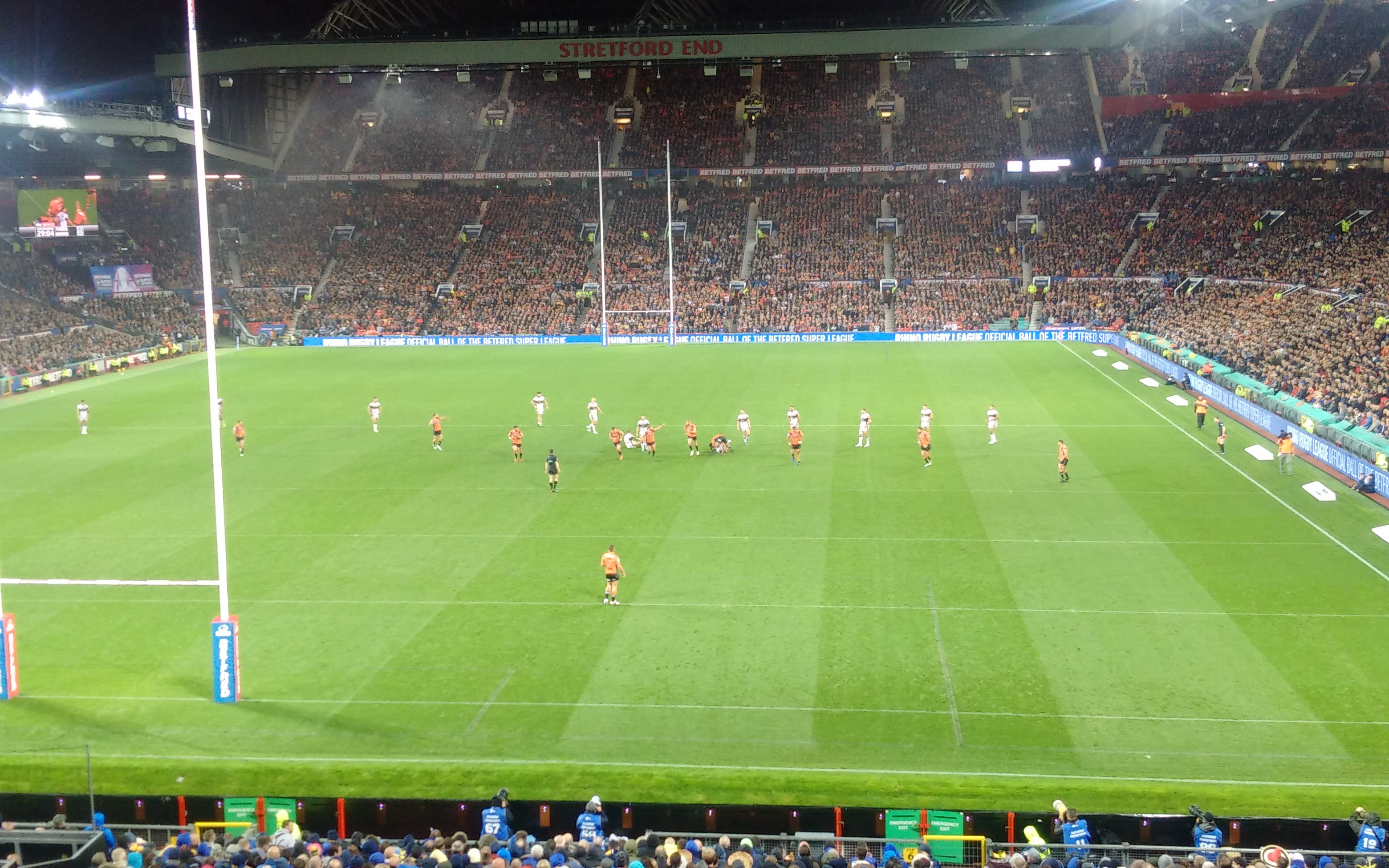
The 2017 Super League Grand Final at Old Trafford

When the Rugby League World Cup was hosted by Great Britain, Ireland and France in 2000, Old Trafford was chosen as the venue for the final; the match was contested by Australia and New Zealand, and resulted in a 40–12 win for Australia, watched by 44,329. Old Trafford was also chosen to host the 2013 Rugby League World Cup final. The game, played on 30 November, was won by Australia 34–2 over defending champions New Zealand, and attracted a crowd of 74,468, a world record for a rugby league international. During the game, Australia winger Brett Morris suffered a heavy crash into the advertising boards at the Stretford End, emphasising questions raised pre-match over the safety of Old Trafford as a rugby league venue, in particular the short in-goal areas and the slope around the perimeter. In January 2019, Old Trafford was selected to host the 2021 Rugby League World Cup finals, with the men's and women's matches being played as a double header. Australia defeated Samoa 30-10 in front of 67,502 to win their 12th title.

Due to the COVID-19 pandemic, 2020 was the first year in which Old Trafford did not host the Super League Grand Final due to concerns about having to possibly reschedule the match, which Manchester United were unable to accommodate.

=== Rugby union ===
The first rugby union match to be played at Old Trafford was held during the 1924–25 New Zealand rugby union tour of Britain, Ireland and France, when a Lancashire representative side hosted the New Zealand national team, with Manchester United receiving 20 per cent of the gate receipts.

Old Trafford hosted its first rugby union international in 1997, when New Zealand defeated England 25–8. A second match was played at Old Trafford on 6 June 2009, when England beat Argentina 37–15. The stadium was one of 12 confirmed venues set to host matches of the 2015 Rugby World Cup; however, in April 2013 United pulled out of the contract over concerns about pitch quality and not wanting to compromise their relationship with the 13-man code.

=== Other sports ===
Before the Old Trafford football stadium was built, the site was used for games of shinty, the traditional game of the Scottish Highlands. During the First World War, the stadium was used by American soldiers for games of baseball. In July 1927, Old Trafford hosted a tennis exhibition match between French Olympic champion and Grand Slam winner Suzanne Lenglen and British Ceylonese player Evelyn Dewhurst. Lenglan defeated Dewhurst 6–0, 6–2 in front of over 15,000 spectators. On 17 September 1981, the North Section of cricket's Lambert & Butler Floodlit Competition was played there; in the semi-finals, Nottinghamshire defeated Derbyshire and Lancashire beat Yorkshire, before Lancashire beat Nottinghamshire by 8 runs in the final to reach the national final, played between the other regional winners at Stamford Bridge the next day. In October 1993, a WBC–WBO Super-Middleweight unification fight was held at the ground, with around 42,000 people paying to watch WBO champion Chris Eubank fight WBC champion Nigel Benn.

=== Concerts and other functions ===
Aside from sporting uses, several concerts have been played at Old Trafford, with such big names as Bon Jovi, Genesis, Bruce Springsteen, Status Quo, Rod Stewart and Simply Red playing. An edition of Songs of Praise was recorded there in September 1994. Old Trafford is also regularly used for private functions, particularly weddings, Christmas parties and business conferences. The first wedding at the ground was held in the Premier Suite in February 1996.

== Records ==
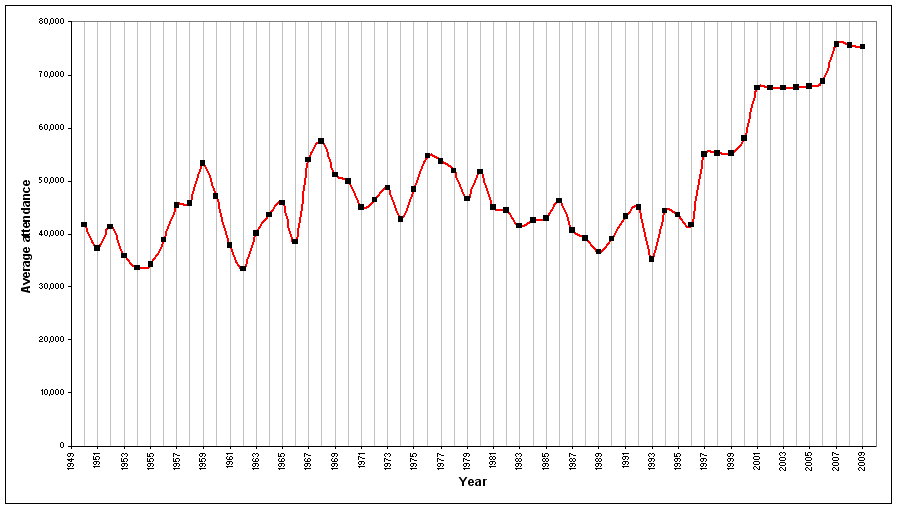
A graph of Manchester United's average attendances over the period from 1949 to 2009

The highest attendance recorded at Old Trafford was 76,962 for an FA Cup semi-final between Wolverhampton Wanderers and Grimsby Town on 25 March 1939. However, this was before the ground was converted to an all-seater stadium, allowing many more people to fit into the stadium. Old Trafford's record attendance as an all-seater stadium currently stands at 76,098, set at a Premier League game between Manchester United and Blackburn Rovers on 31 March 2007. Old Trafford's record attendance for a non-competitive game is 74,731, set on 5 August 2011 for a pre-season testimonial between Manchester United and New York Cosmos. The lowest recorded attendance at a competitive game at Old Trafford in the post-War era was 11,968, as United beat Fulham 3–0 on 29 April 1950. However, on 7 May 1921, the ground hosted a Second Division match between Stockport County and Leicester City for which the official attendance was just 13. This figure is slightly misleading as the ground also contained many of the 10,000 spectators who had stayed behind after watching the match between Manchester United and Derby County earlier that day.

The highest average attendance at Old Trafford over a league season was 75,826, set in the 2006–07 season. The greatest total attendance at Old Trafford came two seasons later, as 2,197,429 people watched Manchester United win the Premier League for the third year in a row, the League Cup, and reach the final of the UEFA Champions League and the semi-finals of the FA Cup. The lowest average attendance at Old Trafford came in the 1930–31 season, when an average of 11,685 spectators watched each game.

== Transport ==
Adjacent to the Sir Bobby Charlton Stand of the stadium is Manchester United Football Ground railway station. The station is between the Deansgate and Trafford Park stations on the Southern Route of Northern Rail's Liverpool to Manchester line. It originally served the stadium on matchdays only, but the service was stopped at the request of the club for safety reasons. The stadium is serviced by the Altricham, Eccles, South Manchester and Trafford Park lines of the Manchester Metrolink network, with the nearest stops being Wharfside, Old Trafford (which it shares with the Old Trafford Cricket Ground) and Exchange Quay at nearby Salford Quays. All three stops are less than 10 minutes' walk from the football ground.

Buses 255 and 256, which are run by Stagecoach Manchester and 263, which is run by Arriva North West run from Piccadilly Gardens in Manchester to Chester Road, stopping near Sir Matt Busby Way, while Stagecoach's 250 service stop outside Old Trafford on Wharfside Way and X50 service stops across from Old Trafford on Water's Reach. There are also additional match buses on the 255 service, which run between Old Trafford and Manchester city centre. Other services that serve Old Trafford are Arriva's 79 service (Stretford – Swinton), which stops on Chester Road and 245 (Altrincham – Exchange Quay), which stops on Trafford Wharf Road, plus First Greater Manchester service 53 (Cheetham – Pendleton) and Stagecoach's 84 service (Withington Hospital – Manchester), which stop at nearby Trafford Bar tram stop. The ground also has several car parks, all within walking distance of the stadium; these are free to park in on non-matchdays.

Preceded by Crystal Palace; London	FA Cup Final; 1915	Succeeded by Stamford Bridge; London
Preceded by Wembley Stadium; London	Rugby League World Cup; Final venue 2000	Succeeded by Suncorp Stadium; Brisbane
Preceded by Hampden Park; Glasgow	UEFA Champions League; Final venue 2003	Succeeded by Arena AufSchalke; Gelsenkirchen
Preceded by Suncorp Stadium; Brisbane	Rugby League World Cup; Final venue 2013	Succeeded by Suncorp Stadium; Brisbane
