= Manchester United Football Ground railway station =

Disused railway station in Greater Manchester, England

Manchester United Football Ground
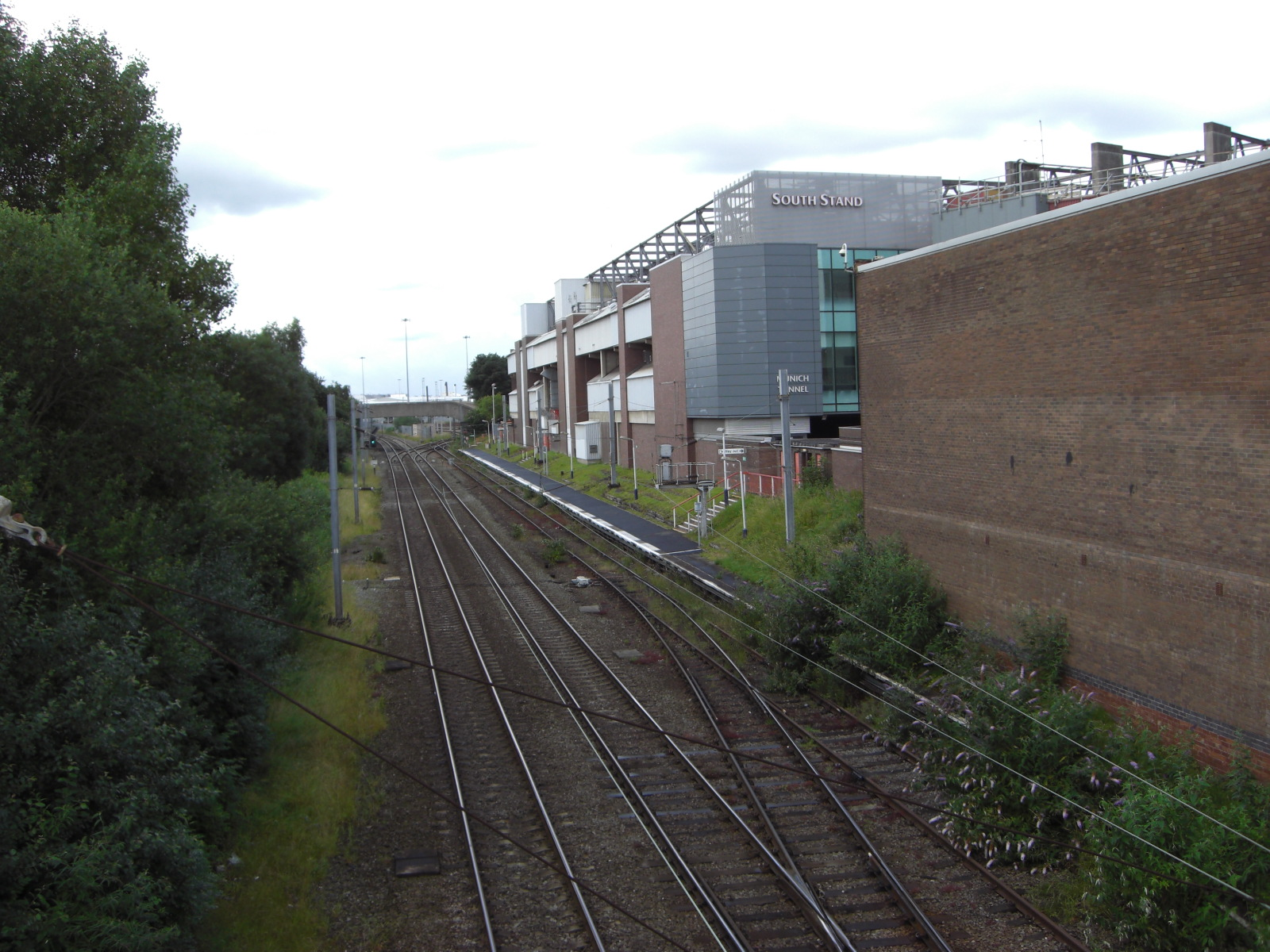
- The station, next to Old Trafford football stadium, photo taken in July 2009

General information
- Location: Old Trafford, Trafford, Greater Manchester; England
- Coordinates: 53.4621°N 2.2914°W
- Grid reference: SJ806961
- Managed by: Northern Trains
- Platforms: 1

Other information
- Status: Services suspended
- Station code: MUF
- Classification: DfT category F2

History
- Post-grouping: Cheshire Lines Committee

Key dates
- 21 August 1935: Opened
- 10 December 2017: Last trains
Location

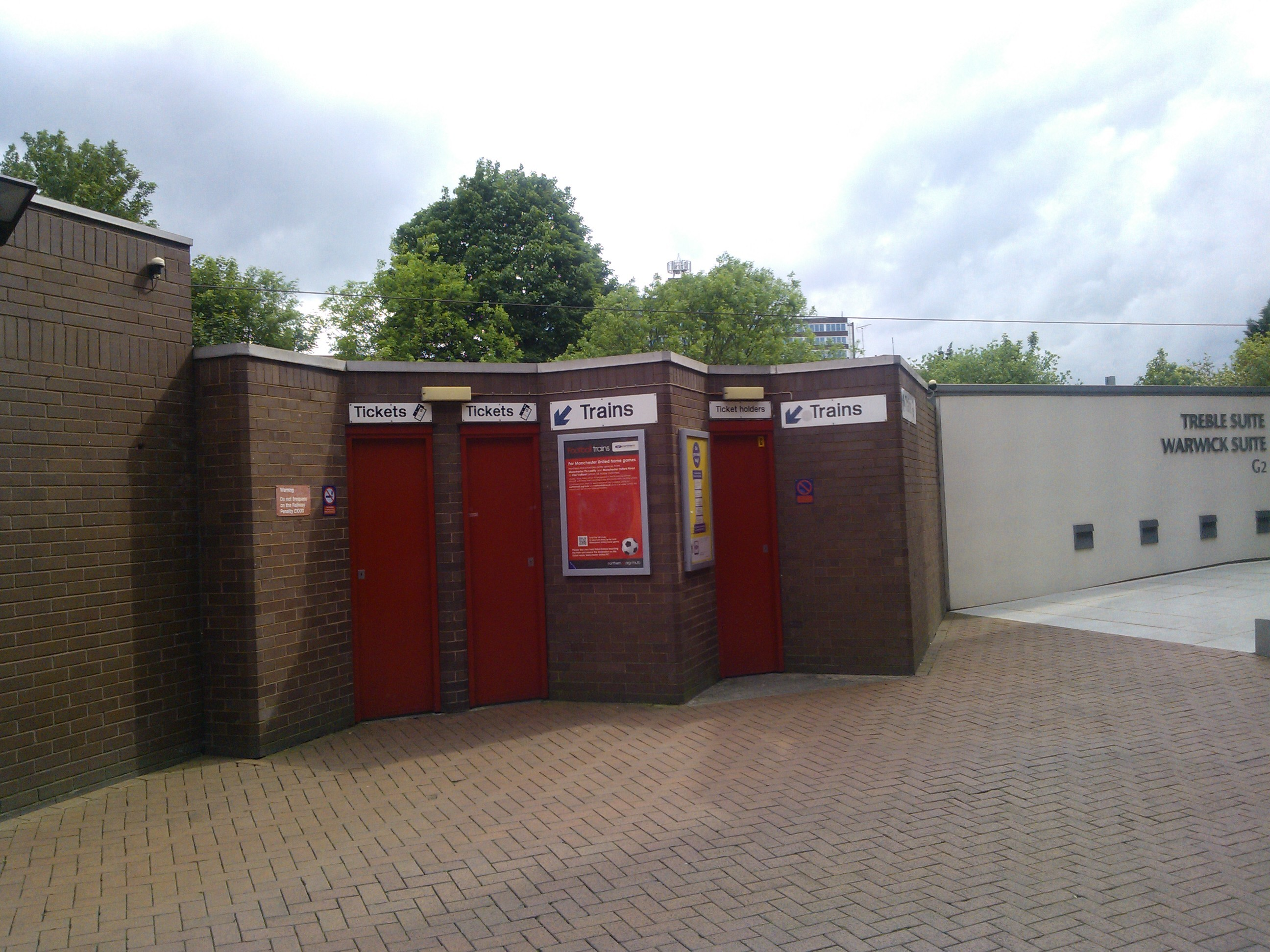
The entrance to Manchester United Football Ground railway station, adjacent to the South Stand at Old Trafford in May 2014

Manchester United Football Ground railway station, often known as the Old Trafford Halt or Manchester United FC Halt, is next to Old Trafford football stadium in Old Trafford, Greater Manchester, England. It is on the southern Liverpool-Manchester line between Deansgate and Trafford Park. Services to the station have been suspended since 2018.

== History ==
The station was constructed by the Cheshire Lines Committee and opened on 21 August 1935. It was provided with one timber-built platform and was served, on match days only, by a shuttle service of steam-hauled trains from Manchester Central railway station.

It was named United Football Ground initially, but was renamed Old Trafford Football Ground on 29 January 1936. The date of change to the current name is not known.

== Service ==
The station was used only on match days; it is sited directly adjacent to the South Stand of Old Trafford football stadium. However, since 2018, these match day services have not operated at the request of the club due to health and safety concerns. It is one of very few National Rail stations in Great Britain not to be included in the ORR station usage stats.

Preceding station	National Rail	Following station
Terminus	Northern Trains; Manchester United Football Ground - Manchester Piccadilly (Match days only) (Service suspended)	Deansgate
