= Sir Matt Busby Way =

Road in Old Trafford, Greater Manchester, England

Coordinates: 53.4633°N 2.2893°W

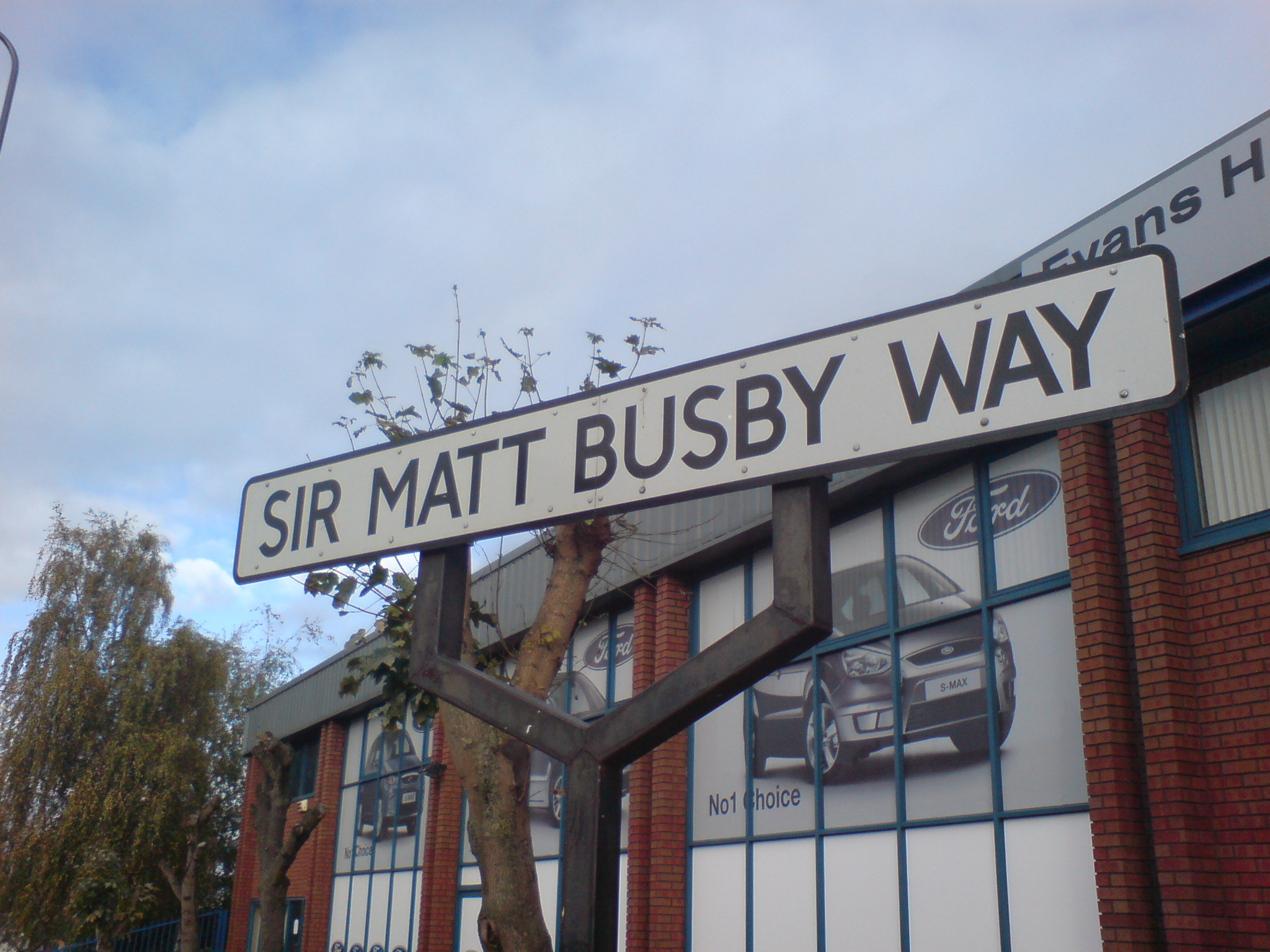
A road sign marking the south entrance to Sir Matt Busby Way

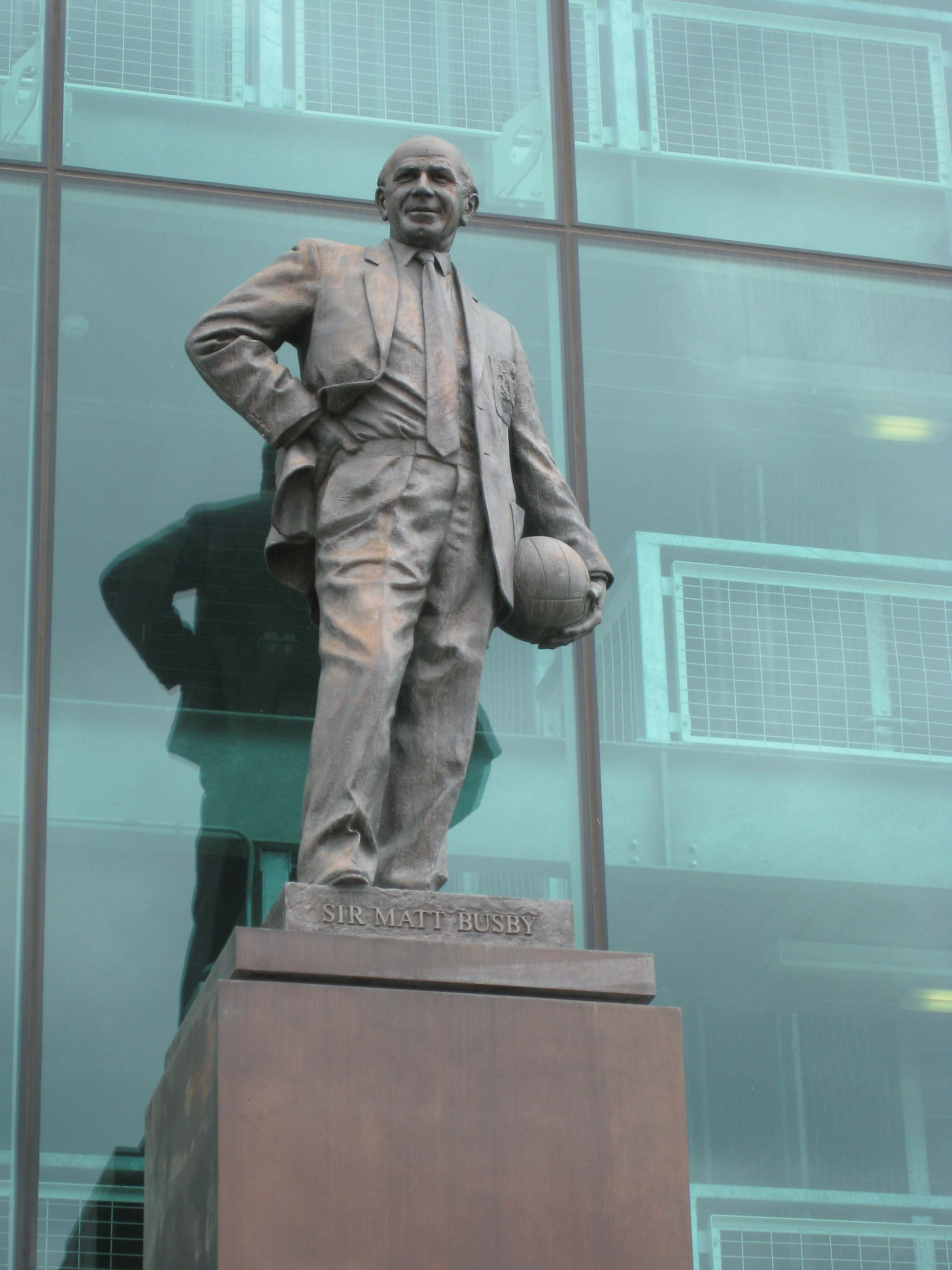
The statue of Matt Busby in front of Old Trafford stadium

Sir Matt Busby Way is a road in Old Trafford, Greater Manchester, England. It is the location of Manchester United's Old Trafford football ground. Formerly known as Warwick Road North, it was renamed in 1993 in honour of Sir Matt Busby, who managed Manchester United in two spells between 1945 and 1971. Busby died less than a year later on 20 January 1994, at the age of 84. A bronze statue of Sir Matt Busby, erected in 1996, stands on the exterior of the East Stand of the Old Trafford stadium, overlooking Sir Matt Busby Way.

The road is approximately 420 metres (459 yd) long and runs from Chester Road (A56) to Trafford Park Road/Wharfside Way (A5081). It also connects to United Road, which runs under the North Stand of the Old Trafford stadium, and Railway Road, which runs alongside the railway line adjacent to the stadium.

In June 2011, Manchester United and Trafford Council began the process of permanently pedestrianising Sir Matt Busby Way. Previously, it was completely open to traffic, except for short periods during events at the Old Trafford stadium. The restrictions, which were introduced on 12 December 2008, meant the road would close three hours prior to an event and reopen two hours afterwards.
