= List of tourist attractions in Myrtle Beach, South Carolina =

The following is a list of tourist attractions in the Myrtle Beach, South Carolina area.

== Current Attractions ==
- Barefoot Landing, a large shopping complex located in North Myrtle Beach. Opened 1988.
  - Alabama Theatre, a public theatre. 1993
  - House of Blues, a live concert music hall. 1997
- Broadway at the Beach, a large entertainment complex and shopping mall. 1995
  - Jimmy Buffett's Margaritaville, a themed restaurant. 2004
  - Hard Rock Cafe, opened in 1995 (was formerly in a pyramid with sphinxes until 2016 when it moved to a new location)
  - Pavilion Nostalgia Park, an amusement park with rides taken from the defunct Myrtle Beach Pavilion
  - Ripley's Aquarium, an aquarium
  - WonderWorks, an entertainment center. 2011 (1 of 5 in the U.S.)
- Brookgreen Gardens, sculpture garden in Murrells Inlet. 1932
- The Carolina Opry, a music variety theater. 1993
- Coastal Grand Mall, a large shopping mall. 2004
- Family Kingdom Amusement Park, an oceanfront amusement park 1966. and Splashes Oceanfront Water Park 1977
- Funplex Myrtle Beach, an entertainment and amusement center
- Gay Dolphin Gift Cove, billed as the nation's largest gift shop. 1954
- Hollywood Wax Museum Myrtle Beach, an entertainment center featuring replicas and interactive displays of celebrities. 2014
- Legends In Concert, featuring live concerts paying tribute to musical icons of the past and present. 2010
- Market Common, a shopping district and lifestyle center. 2008
- Medieval Times, a Medieval-themed dinner theater located behind the former Freestyle Music Park. 1995
- Myrtle Beach Boardwalk, a boardwalk and oceanfront promenade. 2010
- Myrtle Beach Mall, a shopping mall located in Briarcliffe Acres. 1986
- Myrtle Beach SkyWheel, a large oceanfront Ferris wheel. 2011
- Myrtle Beach Speedway, a small racetrack. 1958
- Myrtle Beach State Park, a small state park which consists miles of forest that stretch along the Atlantic Ocean. 1935
- Myrtle Waves, a large water park. 1985
- Pirates Voyage, a pirate-themed dinner theater operated by Dolly Parton's Dixie Stampede, located next to The Carolina Opry. 2010
- Ripley's Believe It or Not!, a themed museum
- Ripley's Haunted Adventure
- TicketReturn.com Field, a baseball field home to the Myrtle Beach Pelicans. 1999
- Topgolf, a sports entertainment facility. 2019

== Former attractions ==
- Celebration Music Theatre-a musical theatre at Surfside Beach that only ran in 2011
- Grand Theatre-a theatre Surfside Beach that only ran in 2012 and 2013
- Freestyle Music Park (formerly Hard Rock Park), a theme park (opened 2008 [with a concert by the Eagles and The Moody Blues]-closed in Sept. 2009).
- MagiQuest, a live action role-playing game establishment (2005-closed 2015).
- Myrtle Beach Pavilion an amusement park that was located in the "heart" of Myrtle Beach (1948-closed Sept. 30, 2006).
- Planet Hollywood, a movie themed restaurant (with mostly 90s movies memorabilia) (opened in 1996 with stars Bruce Willis, Will Smith, and Jennifer Love Hewitt-closed Sept. 8, 2015).
- Shark Attack Adventure Golf-a mini golf course with animatronics
- Official All Star Café, sports themed restaurant in the 90s (building now houses Legends in Concert)
- Waccamaw Pottery, a shopping center (1977-closed in 2001).
