= Sky Wheel =

== Ferris wheels ==
- Myrtle Beach SkyWheel, at Myrtle Beach, South Carolina, US
- Niagara SkyWheel, at Clifton Hill, Niagara Falls, Ontario, Canada
- Sky Wheel, at Janfusun Fancyworld, Douliu, Yunlin, Taiwan

== Double wheels ==
- Sky Wheel, a type of amusement ride produced by Allan Herschell Company, New York, US
- Sky Wheel, an amusement ride at Cedar Point, Sandusky, Ohio, US

== Roller coasters ==
- Sky Wheel, a SkyLoop coaster, at Skyline Park, Bad Wörishofen, Bavaria, Germany
