= Fisherman's Restaurant and Bar =

Seafood restaurant in Seattle, Washington, U.S.

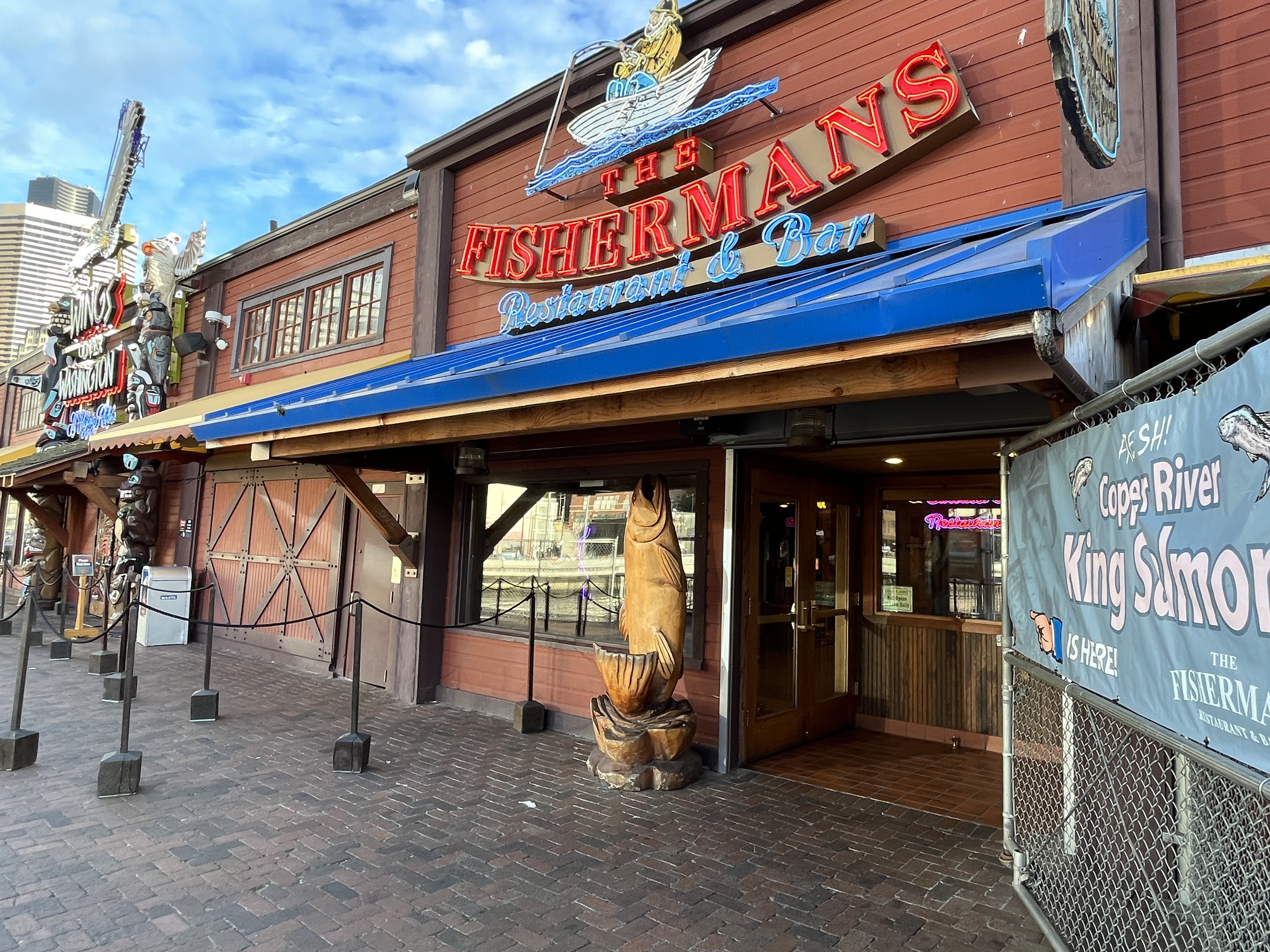
- The restaurant's exterior, 2022
- Interactive map of Fisherman's Restaurant and Bar

Restaurant information
- Food type: Seafood
- Location: 1301 Alaskan Way, Seattle, Washington, 98101, United States
- Coordinates: 47°36′22″N 122°20′28″W
- Website: fishermansrestaurantseattle.com

Fisherman's Restaurant and Bar is a seafood restaurant in Seattle, in the U.S. state of Washington.

== Description ==
Fisherman's is a seafood restaurant housed in Miner's Landing at Pier 57 in Seattle's Central Waterfront. The menu has included chowders and Alaskan halibut. In 2014, Dominic Holden of The Stranger wrote: "At the end of this pier is the Fisherman's Restaurant & Bar, which contains two massive brick patios (more than 80 tables between two levels) that jut out into Elliott Bay next to the Great Wheel. Bedecked with umbrellas, the seating is shady and the views are unbeatable: ferries, mountains, water, the whole Seattle thing. And it's inexpensive, and it's got lots of beer on tap, a full bar, and a happy hour, and—most of all—it feels nothing like the rest of Miner's Landing."

== History ==
The restaurant was owned by Great Western Pacific, Inc. as of 2009–2020. In 2018, the restaurant hosted a beer garden at KEXP-FM's Rocks the Dock event. Nick Novello served as chef as of 2019–2020. For Thanksgiving in 2019, the restaurant served a five-course prix fixe "with a seafood twist".

In 2021, the restaurant began serving four-course dinners at the neighboring Great Wheel. The special menu has included prawn cocktail, Caesar salad, grilled salmon, pilaf, vegetables, and chocolate pot de creme.

== See also ==
- List of seafood restaurants
