= Mad Mouse =

Mad Mouse may refer to:

- Wild mouse, a type of roller coaster.
- Mad Mouse (Michigan's Adventure), a wild mouse roller coaster at Michigan's Adventure in Muskegon, Michigan, United States
- Mad Mouse (Valleyfair), a wild mouse roller coaster at Valleyfair in Shakopee, Minnesota, United States
- Mad Mouse (Pavilion), a wild mouse roller coaster formerly located at Myrtle Beach Pavilion in Myrtle Beach, South Carolina, United States
