= Carolina Country Music Fest =

Outdoor country music festival

- Status: Active
- Genre: Country Music Festival
- Date: June 5–8, 2025
- Frequency: Annually
- Venue: Burroughs and Chapin Pavilion Place (former Myrtle Beach Pavilion site)
- Location: Myrtle Beach, South Carolina
- Country: United States
- Years active: 2015–present (Myrtle Beach, SC)
- Inaugurated: June 3–7, 2015
- Most recent: June 6–9, 2024
- Attendance: 30,000-35,000
- Organizer: Full House Productions
- Website: carolinacountrymusicfest.com

Carolina Country Music Fest (CCMF) is an outdoor country music festival that takes place in June of each year in Myrtle Beach, South Carolina. The festival was founded in 2015 by Charlotte-based company Full House Productions.

Carolina Country Music Fest is held at the Myrtle Beach Boardwalk within the Burroughs and Chapin Pavilion Place (former Myrtle Beach Pavilion site). and is a three-day (Friday through Sunday) country music festival that begins with the McDonald's Thursday Night Kick-Off Concert Powered by MyrtleBeach.com on Thursday evening. The premiere event in 2015 brought in over 20,000 attendees, while the second year (2016) brought in 25,000. The 2017 CCMF welcomed 30,000 people to the festival. In 2020, the festival was cancelled due to COVID-19, but was welcomed to Myrtle Beach once again from June 10–13, 2021. The sold-out 2021 festival drew an estimated 35,000 attendees.

The Carolina Country Music Fest spans 18 acres of coastal area from the boardwalk to Ocean Boulevard, and added a fifth stage in 2021 to accommodate more artists and larger crowds. The stages include the Coors Light Main Stage, the Crown Royal Stage, Bluemoon Sound Stage and the Coca-Cola Stage + the private artist ZYN stage. The fifth annual Carolina Country Music Fest was held June 6–9, 2019. The annual event has sold out two years in a row (2021, 2022).

== History ==
=== 2015 ===
The 2015 Carolina Country Music Fest was held Thursday, June 3 through Sunday, June 7, 2015 and hosted over 20,000 attendees. The full lineup included Outshyne, Davisson Brothers Band, Cole Swindell, Big & Rich, Brandon Bailey, Brian Davis, Brooke Eden, Colt Ford, Corey Smith, Darrell Harwood, David Nail, Dee Jay Silver, Dirty Grass Soul, Early Ray, Eric Church, Gal Friday, Georgia Satellites, Hunter Hayes, John King, Kellie Pickler, Kuntry Boys, Lady Antebellum, Margaret Valentine, Marshall Tucker Band, Mikele Buck, Mo Pitney, Morgan's Road, Rainey Qualley, Rascal Flatts, Ricky Young, Rodney Atkins, Sam Hunt, Taylor Centers, Christina Taylor, Trent Tomlinson, Tim Cifers and multiple Battle of the Bands contest winners

=== 2016 ===
The 2016 Carolina Country Music Fest was held Thursday, June 9 through Sunday, June 12, 2016 and hosted 25,000 attendees. The full lineup included Chris Lane, Chase Rice, Cole Swindell, David Ray, Dee Jay Silver, Florida Georgia Line, Gary Allen, Gyth Rigdon, Jake Owen, Kane Brown, Keith Urban, Kelsea Ballerini, Kurt Stevens, Lauren Jenkins, Lewis Brice, Maren Morris, Morgan Myles, Shawn Bilton, Tim McGraw, A Thousand Horses, Chase Bryant, Joe Nichols, Michael Ray, Outshyne, The Cadillac Three and multiple Battle of the Bands contest winners

=== 2017 ===
The 2017 Carolina Country Music Fest was held Thursday, June 8 through Sunday, June 11, 2017 and hosted 30,000 attendees. The full lineup included Montgomery Gentry, Brett Young, Trent Tomlinson, Darrell Harwood, Walker McGuire, Taylor Norris, Dee Jay Silver, Darius Rucker, Billy Currington, Kip Moore, Parmalee, Morgan Myles, Luke Combs, Lewis Brice, Kennedy Fitzsimmons, Kenny Chesney, Lee Brice, Granger Smith, Chris Lane, Lanco, Davisson Brothers, Love & Theft, Kevin Mac, Lauren Jenkins, Jason Aldean, Chris Young, Big & Rich, Gretchen Wilson, Drake White & The Big Fire, Jordan Rager, Runaway June, Jordan Davis, Zach Seabaugh and multiple Battle of the Bands contest winners

=== 2018 ===
The 2018 Carolina Country Music Fest was held Thursday, June 7 through Sunday, June 10, 2018, and hosted over 30,000 attendees. The full lineup included Luke Bryan, Toby Keith, Zac Brown Band, Cole Swindell, Tracy Lawrence, Chris Lane, Brett Young, Brett Eldredge, Old Dominion, Kane Brown, Russell Dickerson, Michael Ray, Runaway June, Craig Morgan, Deana Carter, Dee Jay Silver, Morgan Wallen, Colt Ford, Lewis Brice, Jimmie Allen, Josh Phillips, Stephanie Quayle, Tim Montana, Kennedy Fitzsimmons, Shawn Bilton, Dylan Scott, Caleb Gilbert, Jordan Middleton + The Low End, McGuire, Warrick McZeke, Ryan Trotti, Dustin Chapman, Yesterday's Wine, James Barker Band, Jon Langston, Devin Dawson, Bryan Mayer, Davisson Brothers, Kasey Tyndall, and Muscadine Bloodline.

=== 2019 ===
The 2019 Carolina Country Music Fest was held Thursday, June 6 through Sunday, June 9, 2019, and hosted over 30,000 attendees. The lineup included Alabama, Dierks Bentley, Thomas Rhett, Gyth Rigdon, Travis Denning, Morgan Evans, Ryan Trotti, Sweet Tea Trio, High Valley, Smithfield, Gabby Barrett, Jimmie Allen, Randy Houser, Brothers Osbourne, Trey Landon, Mitchell Tenpenny, Warrick Mczeke, Delta Rae, Gone West, CAM, Dan + Shey, Florida Georgia Line, Matt Stell, Filmore, John Gurney, Dylan Schneider, Rhett Akins, Midland, Kevin MaC, Yesterday's Wine, Dustin Lynch, Trea Landon, The Kyle Dills Band and multiple Battle of the Bands contest winners.

=== 2020 ===
As with nearly all festivals and major events in 2020, CCMF was unable to hold their annual event for the first time since it began in 2015. CCMF was originally scheduled for June 4 – 7, 2020, but was rescheduled to September 17 – 20, 2020 due to concerns surrounding the coronavirus pandemic. While a number of other large events also moved their dates to Fall of 2020, the event was still able to secure nearly their entire original lineup. Unfortunately, as the pandemic continued and it became apparent that a gathering of that size would not be able to be done safely, CCMF announced on August 11, 2020, that it would be rescheduling their upcoming festival to June 2021.

=== 2021 ===
Tuesday April 12, 2021, it was announced that Myrtle Beach City Council granted the organizers a special event permit for the four-day music festival. The annual Carolina Country Music Fest made its return to Myrtle Beach June 10–13 of 2021. The festival brought back nearly all of its 2020 artist lineup, including major headliners Luke Combs, Eric Church, Darius Rucker and Jake Owen. On January 14, 2021, it was announced that Rodney Atkins and LoCash were added to the lineup. The sold-out event drew an estimated 35,000 attendees.

=== 2022 ===
The annual Carolina Country Music Fest was held Thursday, June 9 through Sunday, June 12, 2022. The festival was host to over 30 artists across four unique stages on the festival grounds. The lineup included Luke Bryan, Jason Aldean, Keith Urban, Chase Rice, Chris Lane, Riley Green, Jon Pardi, LoCash, Jimmie Allen, Gabby Barrett, The Marshall Tucker Band, Rodney Atkins, Chris Janson, Elvie Shane, Tenille Townes, Frank Ray, Brittney Spencer, Jukebox Rehab, Lewis Brice, Neon Union and more. The once again sold-out event drew 35,000 attendees.

=== 2023 ===
The eighth annual Carolina Country Music Fest was be held June 8 – 11, 2023. On July 22, 2022, it was announced that Morgan Wallen will be a headliner for CCMF in 2023. On August 12,2022, it was announced that Miranda Lambert will be the first female country artist in CCMF history to headline one of the nights at the Carolina Country Music Fest. On August 13, 2022, it was announced that CCMF has sold out their mainstage VIP tickets for 2023 festival. Also announced was that 2 more headline acts to be announced and also that general admission tickets are available to purchase. On May 9, 2023, Morgan Wallen announced that cords his next six weeks of shows including CCFM have been postponed due to damaging his vocal cords. CCMF said are working to reschedule Morgan for 2024 and wished him a speedy recovery. On May 9, 2023, it was announced that Kenny Chesney would be headlining at CCMF Saturday, June 10 in place of Morgan Wallen. The founder of CCMF said that the lineup for this year is stacked and that Kenny is going to throw a great party. On may 23,2023, it was announced that the CCMF pre-party will be held at Rip-Tydz in Myrtle Beach on June 7, 2023, at 7pm. The event will be sponsored by Coors Light and will feature live music, drink specials, and great food.

== Awards ==
On February 10, 2022, it was announced the CCMF was nominated for festival of the year by the Academy of Country Music Awards. CCMF is one of five events in the running for festival of the year

On April 14, 2023, it was announced the CCMF one of 6 festivals nominated for the Academy of Country Music’s festival of the year award. The annual ACM awards shows will be held at 8 p.m. May 11 at the Ford Center at The Star in Frisco, Texas.

== Attendance ==
Festival Year	Nightly Attendance
2015	20,000
2016	25,000
2017	30,000
2018	30,000
2019	30,000
2020	Did Not Occur
2021	35,000
2022	35,000

== Artists ==
Each year, CCMF hosts 30 of country's headlining artists plus up-and-coming, regional and local acts. This table is up to date as of 5/12/2023 and is based on the official CCMF website 2023 artist lineup.

Artist Name	2015	2016	2017	2018	2019	2021	2022	2023
2DIGH4		X						
A Thousand Horses		X						
Alabama					X			
Alana Springsteen								X
Andrew Jannakos					X			
Ashland Craft						X		
Ashley McBryde						X		
Avery Roberson							X	
Bailey Zimmerman								X
Ben Chapman								X
Big & Rich	X		X					
Billy Currington			X					
Blanco Brown						X		
Bowman							X	
Brandon Bailey	X							
Brett Eldredge				X				
Bret Michaels								X
Brett Young		X	X	X				
Brian Davis	X							
Brittney Spencer							x	
Bryan Mayer				X				
Brooke Eden	X							
Brooks & Dunn								X
Brothers Osbourne					X			
Buckshot			X					
CAM					X			
Caleb Gilbert				X				
CCMF Southern Rounds							X	
Channing Wilson							X	X
Chase Bryant		X						
Chase Matthew							X	X
Chase Rice		X					X	
Chris Bandi						X		
Chris Janson							X	
Chris Lane		X	X	X			X	
Chris Young			X					
Christina Taylor		X						
Cole Swindell	X	X		X				
Colt Ford	X			X				
Cooper Allen							x	
Corey Smith	X							
Cornbread			X					
Craig Morgan				X				
Dan + Shey					X			
Danny Kensy					X			
Darius Rucker			X			X		
Darrell Harwood	X		X					
David Nail	X							
David Ray		X						
Davisson Brothers	X	X	X	X	X	X	X	X
Deana Carter				X			X	
Dee Jay Silver	X	X	X	X	X		X	X
Delta Rae					X			
Devin Dawson				X				
Diamonds & Whiskey					X	X	X	
Dierks Bentley					X			
DJ Dank Williams							X	
DJ Slim McGraw			X	X	X		X	
Drake Milligan								X
Drake White and The Big Fire			X					
Drew Green								X
Dustin Chapman				X				
Dustin Lynch					X			
Dylan Marlowe								X
Dylan Schneider					X			
Dylan Scott				X				
Early Ray	X							
Elvie Shane							X	
Eric Church	X					X		
Ernest								X
Filmore					X			
Florida Georgia Line		X			X			
Frank Ray							X	
Gabby Barrett					X		X	
Gal Friday	X							
Gary Allan		X						
Georgia Satellites	X							
Gillian Smith							X	X
Gone West					X			
Granger Smith			X					
Greg Parrish							X	
Gretchen Wilson			X					
Greylan James								X
Gyth Rigdon		X			X			
Hardy								X
High Valley					X			
Hunter Hayes	X							
Hunter Holland							X	
Ian Munsick								X
Jake Owen		X				X		
James Barker Band				X				
Jameson Rogers							x	
Jason Aldean			X				X	
Jebb Mac Band			X					
Jimmie Allen				X	X		X	
Jimmy Mowery					X			
Joe Diffie (Tribute Performance)						X		
Joe Nichols		X				X		
Jon Langston				X		X		X
Jon Pardi							x	
John Gurney					X			
Jordan Davis			X			X		
John King	X							
John Morgan								X
Jordan Gray		X						
Jordan Middleton + The Low End				X				
Jordan Rager			X					
Josh Phillips				X				
Jukebox Rehab						X	X	
Kane Brown		X		X				
Kasey Tyndall				X				
Keith Urban		X					X	
Kellie Pickler	X							
Kelsea Ballerini		X				X		
Kennedy Fitzsimmons			X	X				
Kenny Chesney			X					X
Kevin Mac			X		X	X	X	
Kevin Nichols			X		X		X	
Kid G								X
Kip Moore			X					
Kolby Oakley						X		
Kurt Stevens		X	X					
Kyle Dills Band					X			
Lady Antebellum	X							
Laci Kaye Booth							x	
Laine Hardy						X		
Lainey Wilson								X
LANCO			X					
Landon McFadden							X	
Larry Fleet						X		
Laurel Hall							X	X
Lauren Jenkins		X	X					
Lauren Watkins								X
Lee Brice			X					
Leo Brooks						X		
Lewis Brice		X	X	X			X	
Lilly Rose							x	
Love and Theft			X					
LoCash						X	X	
Luke Bryan				X			X	
Luke Combs			X			X		
Maddie Hunt		X						
Magnolia Vale					X			
Margaret Valentine	X							
Maren Morris		X						
Mary Kate Farmer							X	
Marshall Tucker Band	X						X	
Mason Ramsey				X				
Matt Stell					X	X		
Maura Streppa							x	
McGuire				X		X		
Megan Moroney								X
Michael Ray		X		X		X		
Midland					X			
Mikele Buck	X							
Miranda Lambert								X
Mitchell Tenpenny					X	X		
Mo Pitney	X							
Montgomery Gentry			X					
Morgan Evans					X			
Morgan Myles		X	X					
Morgan Wallen				X				
Morgan's Road	X							
Moses Jones			X					
Muscadine Bloodline				X				
Neon Union							X	X
Niko Moon						X		
Old Dominion				X				
Outlaw Apostles							X	
Outshyne	X	X						
Page Mackenzie			X		X			
Parish County Line								X
Parmalee			X			X		
Rainey Qualley	X							
Randy Houser					X			
Rascal Flatts	X							
Ricky Young	X							
Rhett Akins					X			
Riley Green							x	
Rodney Atkins	X					X	X	
Rome & Duddy								X
Runaway June			X	X				
Russell Dickerson				X				
Ryan Hurd		X						
Ryan Kinder			X					
Ryan Trotti				X	X			
Sam Hunt	X							
Scotty McCreery								X
Sara Kelly							X	
Seaforth								X
Shawn Bilton		X	X	X	X			
Shelby Raye Band		X						
Smithfield					X			
Southern Momma							X	
Stephanie Quayle				X				
Steven Metz			X					
Sweet Tea Trio					X			
Taryn Papa							X	
Taylor Norris			X					
Taylor Centers	X							
Taylor Ingle							x	
Teddy Robb						X		
Tenille Townes							x	
The Crew							X	
The Marshall Tucker Band							X	
Thomas Rhett					X			
Tim Cifers	X							
Tim McGraw		X						
Tim Montana				X				
Tim Elliot			X					
Toby Keith				X				
Tracy Lawrence				X				X
TracieLynn								X
Travis Denning					X	X		
Travis Tritt								X
Trea Landon					X			
Trent Thomlinson	X		X					
Walker McGuire			X					
Warrick McZeke				X	X	X	X	
Whiskey Myers								X
Whits End						X		
Wyatt			X					
Yesterday's Wine				X	X		X	
Zac Brown Band				X				
Zach Seabaugh			X					
