= Pier 57 (Seattle) =

Pier in Washington, United States

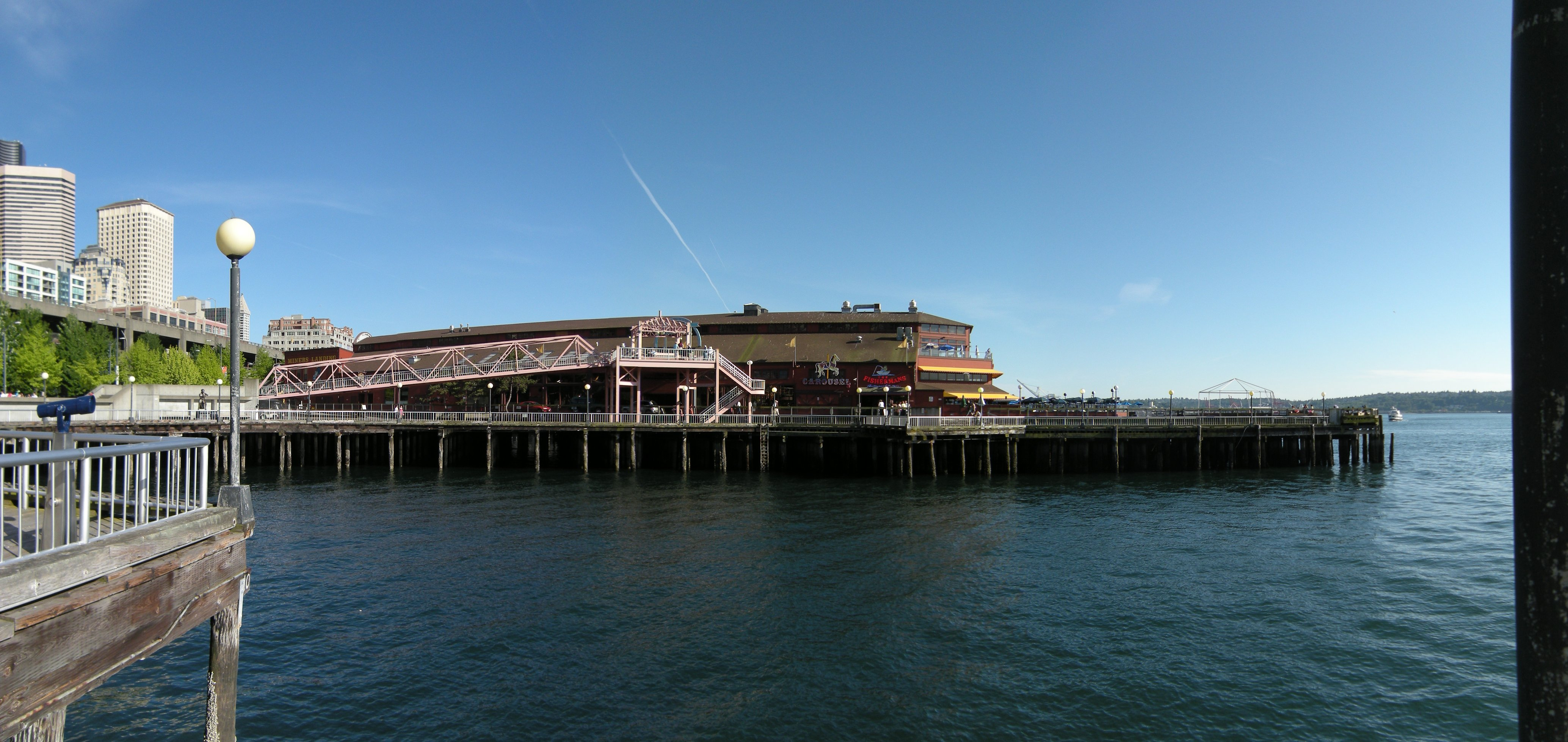
- Panorama of Pier 57
- Location: Seattle, Washington, United States
- Coordinates: 47.6061°N 122.3419°W
- Owner: Hal Griffith

History
- Constructor: Miller and Geske Construction Company
- Completion date: 1902
- Location of Pier 57

Pier 57 (originally Pier 6), also known as Miners Landing, is an historic commercial building built on a pier located along the waterfront in downtown Seattle, Washington near the foot of University Street. Currently under private ownership, the pier is now a tourist attraction with gift shops and restaurants, and houses the Seattle Great Wheel.

== History ==
The pier was originally built for the John B. Agen Company and leased to the North American Trading & Transportation Company. Built from March to May 1902 by the Miller and Geske Construction Company for a total cost of $30,000, it would be repeatedly modified over the course of the next decade to suit the needs of its many various tenants. In 1909, the pier passed into the hands of the Chicago, Milwaukee & St. Paul Railroad, the last of four transcontinental railroads to reach Seattle. The Chicago, Milwaukee & St. Paul was commonly known as the "Milwaukee Road," so the pier became known as the "Milwaukee Pier." It soon became the terminal for the McCormick Steamship Line, the Munson McCormick Line and Osaka Shosen Kaisha, and by the mid-1930s was also known as the "McCormick Terminal." In the 1950s, at least part of the pier was used for fish processing.

By the 1960s, the Port of Seattle owned the pier, and had cut holes in the deck for recreational fishing, but the pilings were deteriorating and the pier was settling unevenly.

The city purchased Pier 57 from the Port in 1971, after cargo shipping at the piers was relocated years earlier to the container port to the south, and renovated it over the next three years. In 1989, the city traded Pier 57 for Piers 62 and 63, and it is now privately owned.

== Private ownership ==
The renovated pier features restaurants, shops, an amusement arcade, and an early 20th-century carousel.

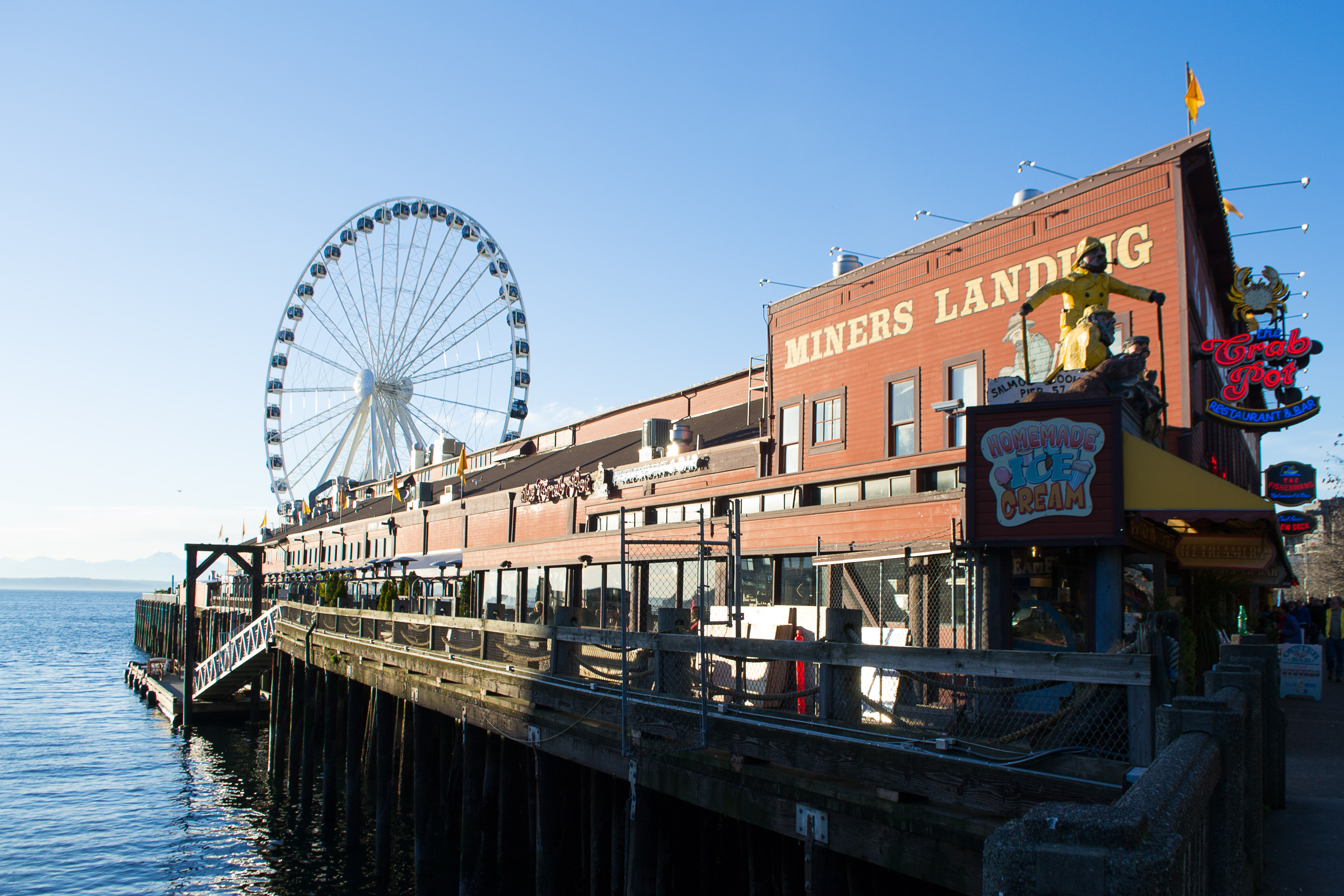
Miners Landing on Pier 57

Seattle businessman and waterfront developer Hal Griffith has envisioned a Ferris wheel on Elliott Bay for nearly 30 years. Along with his family, he is the owner of the Pier 57 upon which the Seattle Great Wheel is located. In addition to the wheel, the pier is the location of Miner's Landing, which consists of souvenir gift shops, tourist attractions, and variety of seafood restaurants.

During the 1980s, Griffith began developing plans to ensure the perpetual existence and success of the family's business ventures on the pier. His plans had long included continual development of the waterfront on Puget Sound to provide entertainment and recreational opportunities for tourists and local residents. His goal was to drive success through innovative ideas, staying a step ahead of the competition. Griffith often met logistical and political roadblocks that inhibited development on the waterfront, but he was determined to build the Ferris wheel on Pier 57, located adjacent to the Alaskan Way Viaduct. While Griffith applied for building permits in November 2010, the project took approximately three years to complete. General work outside of actual building included retrofitting the pilings that support the pier.

In June 2012, the Seattle Great Wheel opened. The 175-foot (53 m) Ferris wheel has 42 climate-controlled gondolas, each holding up to six passengers.

During development and acquisition of the wheel, the State of Washington, King County, the City of Seattle, and the Port of Seattle solidified plans to dig a tunnel to replace the Alaskan Way Viaduct, which had been damaged in an earthquake in 2001. The plans included creating a tunnel that would run beneath the city's downtown core. The initial phase of demolition and removal of the viaduct began on October 21, 2011. Griffith was concerned that without a large tourist attraction, many waterfront businesses would suffer and go out of business during construction. The Seattle Great Wheel was designed to resolve these issues and draw visitors to the waterfront.

== See also ==
- Fisherman's Restaurant and Bar
