= Mad Mouse (Pavilion) =

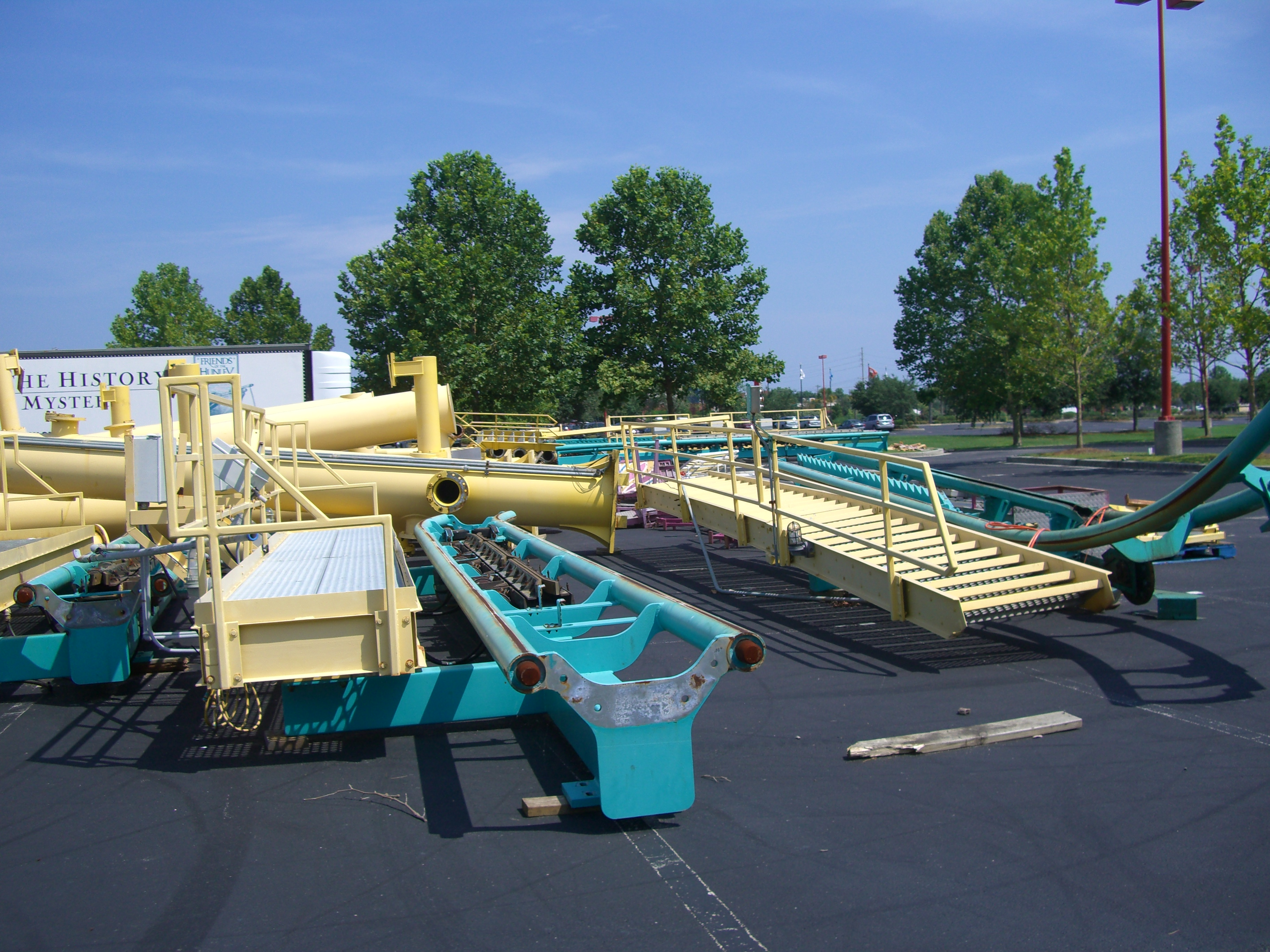
- Mad Mouse track in the Myrtle Beach Nascar Speedpark's parking lot after its demolition

Myrtle Beach Pavilion
- Location: Myrtle Beach Pavilion
- Coordinates: 33.692934°N 78.882397°W
- Status: Removed
- Opening date: June 13, 1998
- Closing date: September 30, 2006
- Cost: $2,000,000 USD

General statistics
- Type: Steel
- Manufacturer: Arrow Dynamics
- Model: Mad Mouse
- Track layout: Wild Mouse
- Lift/launch system: Chain lift hill
- Height: 58 ft (18 m)
- Drop: 30 ft (9.1 m)
- Length: 1,257 ft (383 m)
- Speed: 25 mph (40 km/h)
- Duration: 1:30
- Height restriction: 48 in (122 cm)
- Mad Mouse at RCDB

Mad Mouse was a very compact roller coaster located at the Myrtle Beach Pavilion. Built by Arrow Dynamics in 1998, Mad Mouse was the first of 4 "Mad Mouse" design models installed by Arrow Dynamics (the other three being at Cedar Fair parks, which are Michigan's Adventure, Valleyfair, and California's Great America, in which that one is called Psycho Mouse). The ride cost a modest $2,000,000 and was a part of a 2 roller coaster expansion in 2 years (the other being Hurricane in 2000). The ride closed with the Pavilion on September 30, 2006.
