= Mr. Joe White Avenue =

Boulevard in South Carolina, USA

- 10th Avenue North
- Length: 5.9 mi (9.5 km)
- Location: Horry County
- east end: Cul-de-sac
- Major junctions: US 17 in Myrtle Beach
- west end: Ocean Blvd. in Myrtle Beach

Mr. Joe White Avenue is a boulevard in Myrtle Beach, South Carolina, named for "Mr. Joe", a shoeshine man in Georgetown County, South Carolina, and later Myrtle Beach. Along with U.S. Route 501, Farrow Parkway, Harrelson Boulevard and 21st Avenue North, the upgraded road is one of five major entrances into Myrtle Beach.

== History ==
In 1997, the city heard a presentation of a plan to attract people downtown by making 11th Avenue North "a wide, landscaped boulevard ending in a city park at the beach". In a project that started in July 2001, 10th Avenue North was widened west of downtown Myrtle Beach, with a new connector to 11th Avenue North near Kings Highway. Also in 2001, 11th Avenue North was to be upgraded at a cost of $1.5 million with "wider, brick-paved sidewalks, street surfaces lined with pavers, street lights, underground utilities, trees and flower beds". At the Ocean Boulevard end, a park was planned.

Toward the end of 2001, options for the road's new name were considered. If it was called 10th Avenue North for its entire length, streets from 11th Avenue North to 52nd Avenue North would have to be renamed, causing thousands of addresses to be changed. One idea was Mr. Joe White Avenue. The Myrtle Beach city planning commission approved that name in January 2002, but the city council objected after complaints from business owners. So did Horry County Council, which was responsible for a section of the road west of the Myrtle Beach city limits.

City planning commissioners revisited the idea of keeping the old name for the upgraded sections of 10th and 11th Avenues. One plan called for naming the road 10th Avenue west of a particular location and 11th Avenue east of it. Another suggested renaming only the new section of the road. But once again, the decision to rename the entire road stood. The section of 10th Avenue North from Dunbar Street to Broadway kept its name, and the short section between Broadway and Kings Highway closed in March 2002.

The road opened April 7, 2002, with the intersection of Broadway and Kings Highway closing. The park at Ocean Boulevard and Mr. Joe White Avenue was dedicated to the Justin Plyler, co-founder of Gay Dolphin Gift Cove, at the Sun Fun Festival on June 3, 2005. With the opening of the Myrtle Beach Boardwalk in 2010, Plyler Park became the location of a concert series called "Hot Summer Nights".

== Mr. Joe ==
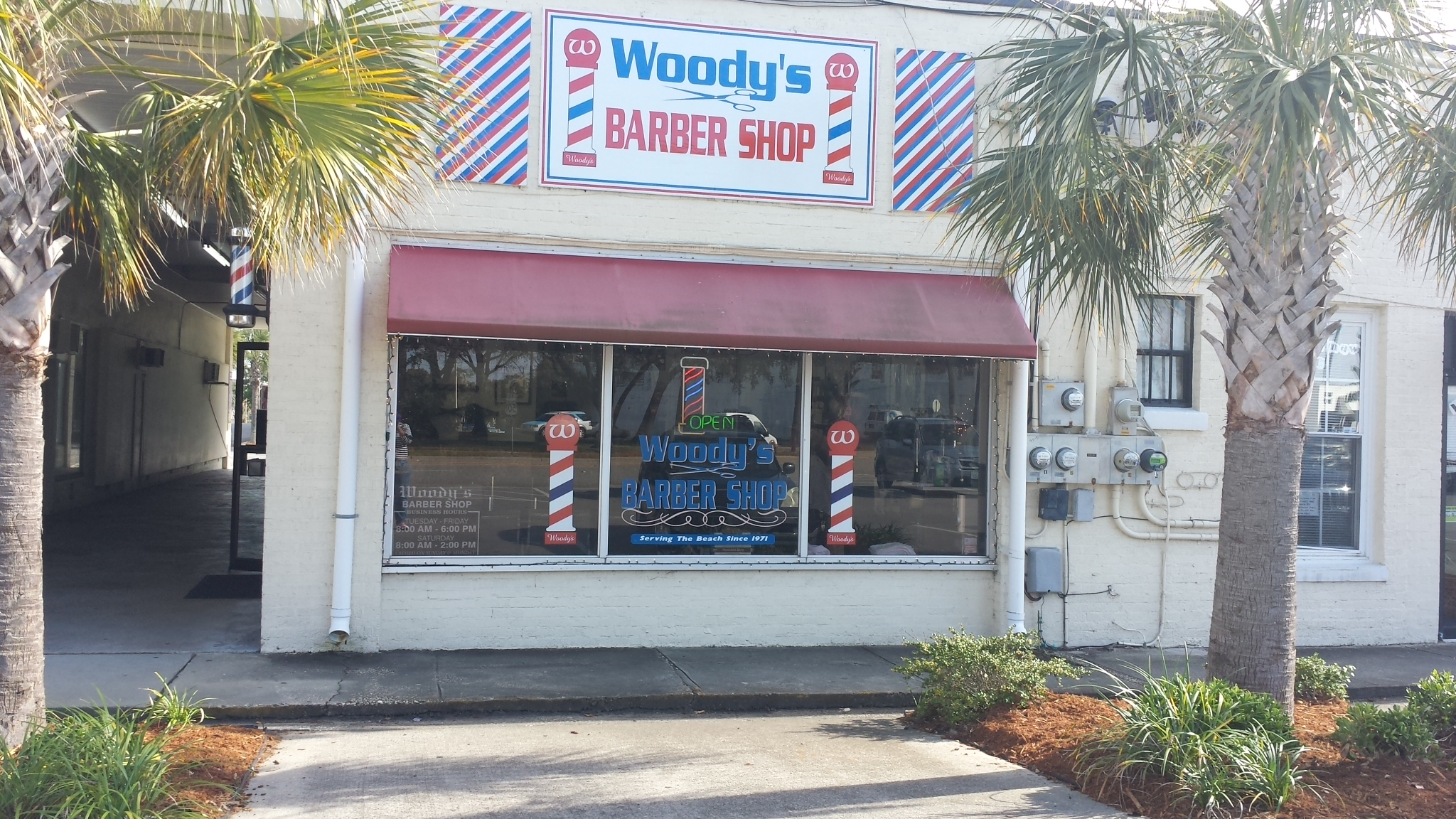
Woody's Barber Shop

Julius W. "Joe" White Sr. was born in 1910 in Georgetown County, South Carolina to a black family. At age 7 he started his shoe shining career, charging 10 cents a pair (another source says he charged 5 cents in the sixth grade)and once shined 290 pairs in one day and proudly referred to himself as a "Shoe Stylist." In 1949 he moved to Myrtle Beach, where he worked in numerous barber shops as well as at the Ocean Forest Hotel. Woody Elvis said White worked at Woody's Barber Shop for more than 30 years. White also had a window washing business that was a going concern. White was also a leader in Shield's Chapel Fire Baptized Holiness Church. He was married to his wife Louise for 66 years. White died December 23, 1997, at age 87 and was highly regarded by Myrtle Beach residents of all races and backgrounds. The street he lived on, White Street, was also named for him, according to Elvis.

== Major intersections ==
The entire route is in Myrtle Beach, Horry County.

mi	km	Destinations	Notes
0.0	0.0	Cul-de-sac	
1.5	2.4	US 17 – Surfside Beach, Georgetown, North Myrtle Beach	
3.6	5.8	Robert Grissom Parkway	
4.2	6.8	US 17 Bus. (Kings Highway)	
5.9	9.5	Ocean Boulevard	
1.000 mi = 1.609 km; 1.000 km = 0.621 mi
