= Seattle Great Wheel =

Ferris wheel in Seattle, Washington, U.S.

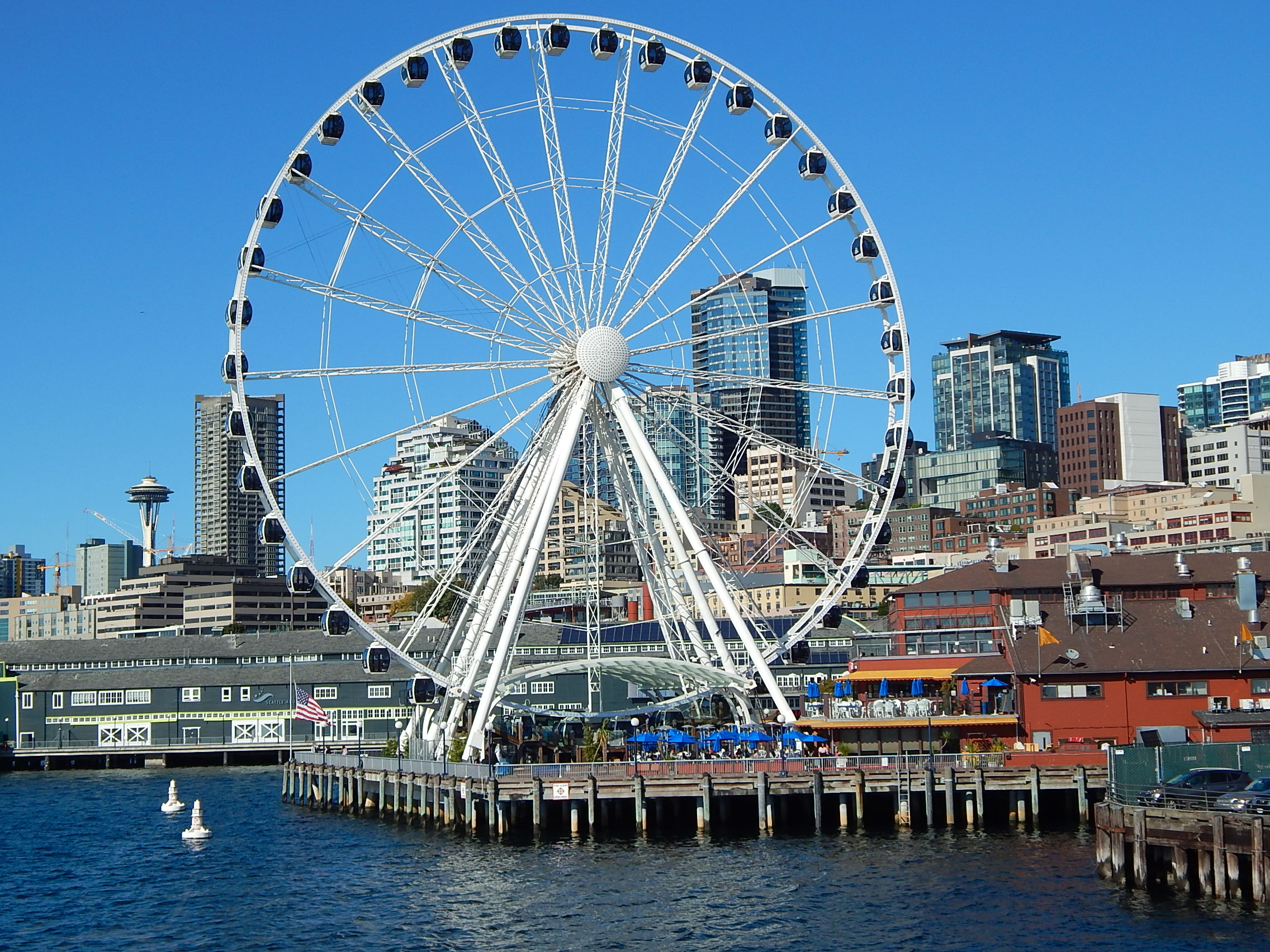
- Seattle Great Wheel in 2017

- Location within Downtown Seattle

General information
- Type: Ferris wheel
- Location: 1301 Alaskan Way; Seattle, Washington; 98101
- Coordinates: 47.6061°N 122.3425°W
- Construction started: April 17, 2012
- Opened: June 29, 2012
- Cost: $20 million
- Owner: Great Western Pacific

Height
- Height: 175 feet (53.3 m)

Design and construction
- Architects: Jackson | Main Architecture, P.S.
- Architecture firm: https://www.jacksonmain.com/
- Structural engineer: Chance Rides GeoEngineers, B&T Design and Engineering
- Main contractor: Manson Construction Co.

Website
- seattlegreatwheel.com

References
- https://www.readgeo.com/geostrata/october_november_2021/MobilePagedArticle.action?articleId=1730114#articleId1730114

The Seattle Great Wheel is a 53-meter Ferris wheel at Pier 57 on Elliott Bay in Seattle, Washington, United States. At an overall height of 175 feet (53.3 m), it was the tallest Ferris wheel on the West Coast of the United States when it opened in June 2012.

== Opening day ==
The inauguration ceremony and opening to the public took place on June 29, 2012. Participants in the ceremony, which commenced at 2:30 p.m., included the U.S. Coast Guard with a presentation of colors, Seattle mayor Michael McGinn who delivered a speech, and the University of Washington cheerleaders, spirit team, and marching band who provided entertainment. Approximately 200 people lined up for the first ride on the wheel.

== Construction and design ==
Seattle was the third city in North America to offer a wheel of this design, following the Niagara SkyWheel at Clifton Hill, Niagara Falls, Canada (which is also 175 feet (53.3 m) tall), and the larger Myrtle Beach SkyWheel in South Carolina, which stands 187 feet (57.0 m) tall. The Seattle wheel is the only one of the three to be built over water.

The Seattle Great Wheel has 42 climate-controlled gondolas, each able to carry up to eight passengers (except the luxury VIP gondola, which had red leather seats and a glass floor, and seats four), giving a maximum capacity of 332. The 12-minute, three-revolution ride extends 40 feet (12.2 m) out over Elliott Bay.

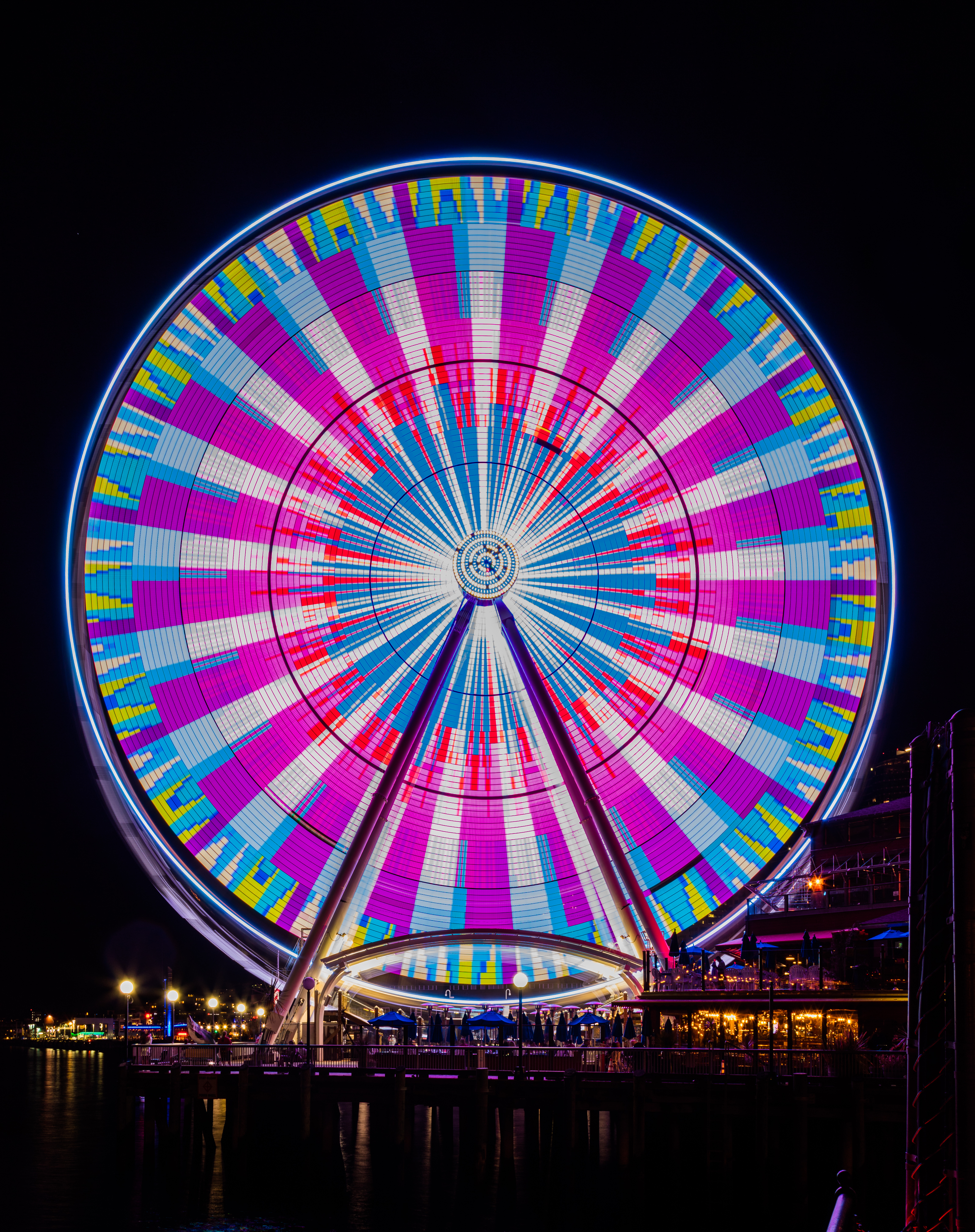
Long exposure photo of Great Wheel lights at night

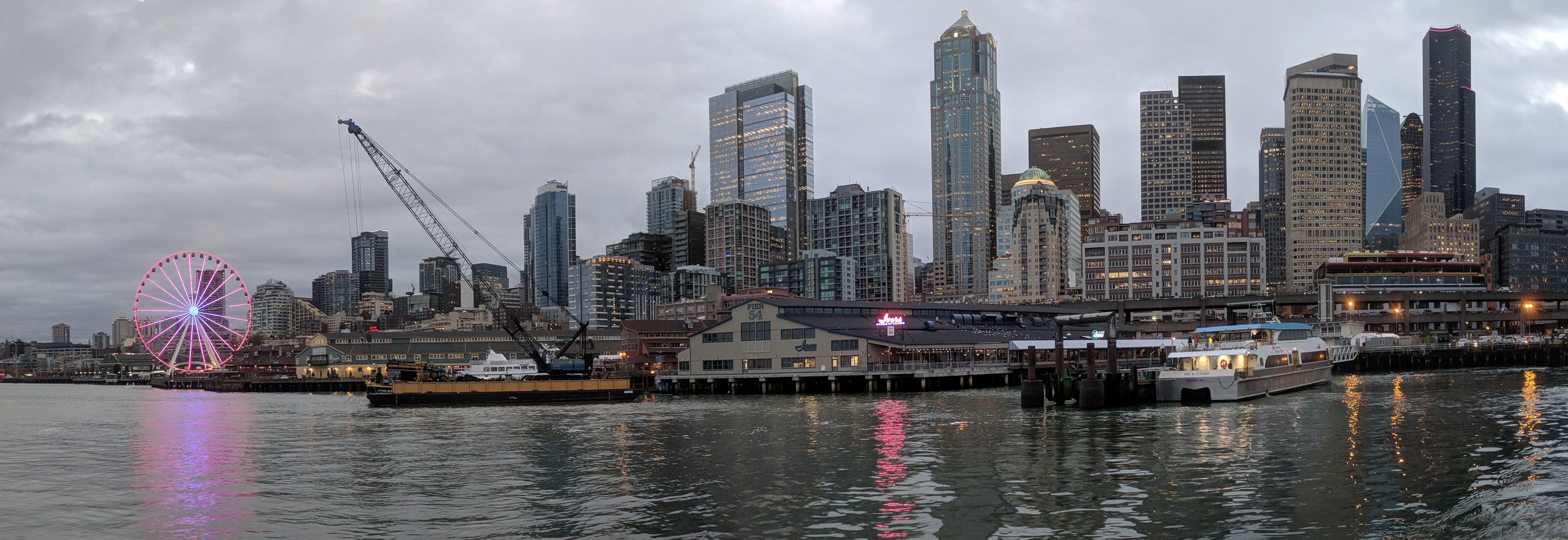
Seattle skyline and Great Wheel near twilight

== In popular culture ==
- The Seattle Great Wheel was featured in the climax for the film Death Note.
- The Seattle Great Wheel is a prominent landmark in the 2020 action-adventure game The Last of Us Part II.
