= Myrtle Beach Pavilion =

Amusement park in South Carolina (1948–2006)

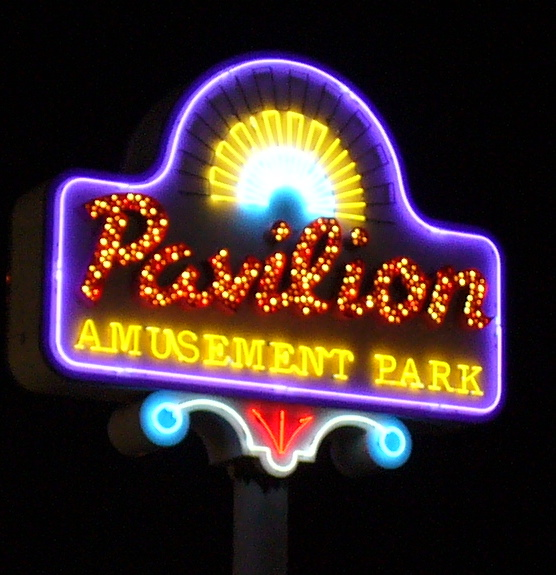
- Pavilion from the main entrance.
- Interactive map of Myrtle Beach Pavilion
- Location: Myrtle Beach, South Carolina, U.S.
- Coordinates: 33.6925°N 78.8816°W
- Opened: 1948
- Closed: September 30, 2006
- Owner: Burroughs & Chapin
- Slogan: One More Ride, One More Thrill, One More Memory, One Last Time (Farewell Season)
- Operating season: Mid-March through late September
- Area: 11 acres (45,000 m^{2})

Attractions
- Total: 36
- Roller coasters: 3
- Water rides: 2
- Website: Pavilion Nostalgia Park

The Myrtle Beach Pavilion was a historic pay-per-ride, no parking fee, 11-acre amusement park that was located in Myrtle Beach, South Carolina at the corner of 9th Avenue North and Ocean Boulevard. It was just a few blocks down from another Myrtle Beach amusement park, the Family Kingdom Amusement Park; both in the "heart" of Myrtle Beach. "The Pavilion" had well over 40 different attractions for kids and thrill-seekers alike, and included the wooden rollercoaster Hurricane: Category 5. Despite all the best efforts made by citizens to save the park, it was lost to redevelopment in 2007. While the park was officially closed and became a vacant lot on 9th Avenue and Ocean Boulevard in 2007, some of the rides and attractions were moved to Broadway at the Beach. Broadway at the Beach and the land at 9th Avenue are both owned by Burroughs & Chapin.

== History ==
Before the Myrtle Beach Pavilion Amusement Park, several Pavilions were built before the one that lasted the longest. All were a product of Burroughs & Chapin, one of the companies responsible for the development of the Myrtle Beach area. Each of the Pavilions had a different architectural style and were even built of different materials, but all served as a place where the community could gather for interaction and entertainment.

The first Pavilion that was built in 1902 and expanded in 1908 was a one-story building that was part of Myrtle Beach's first hotel, the now long-gone Seaside Inn. It was destroyed by a fire, though the bricks from that site were later used in nearby Conway. The Pavilion was later rebuilt in 1923 as a two-story complex, expanded in 1938, which was hit with another fire in 1944 which burned the building to the ground. It was rebuilt for a third time out of poured concrete, opening in 1949, and had a large wooden dance floor which was located on the second floor along with a stage and grandstands. The Magic Attic was where people danced to beach music and later, when it was simply called The Attic, to other musical styles.

The amusement park itself began development on the west side of Ocean Boulevard, across the street from the new Pavilion building in 1948. A traveling carnival had stopped in Conway, South Carolina for the annual Tobacco Festival, but soon found a permanent home across the street from the Pavilion. After the carnival signed an agreement with Myrtle Beach Farms, the Myrtle Beach Pavilion Amusement Park was born. Numerous acts such as ice skaters, bear acts, and talent shows were immediately brought in to supplement the carnival and also to help boost interest in the new "park."

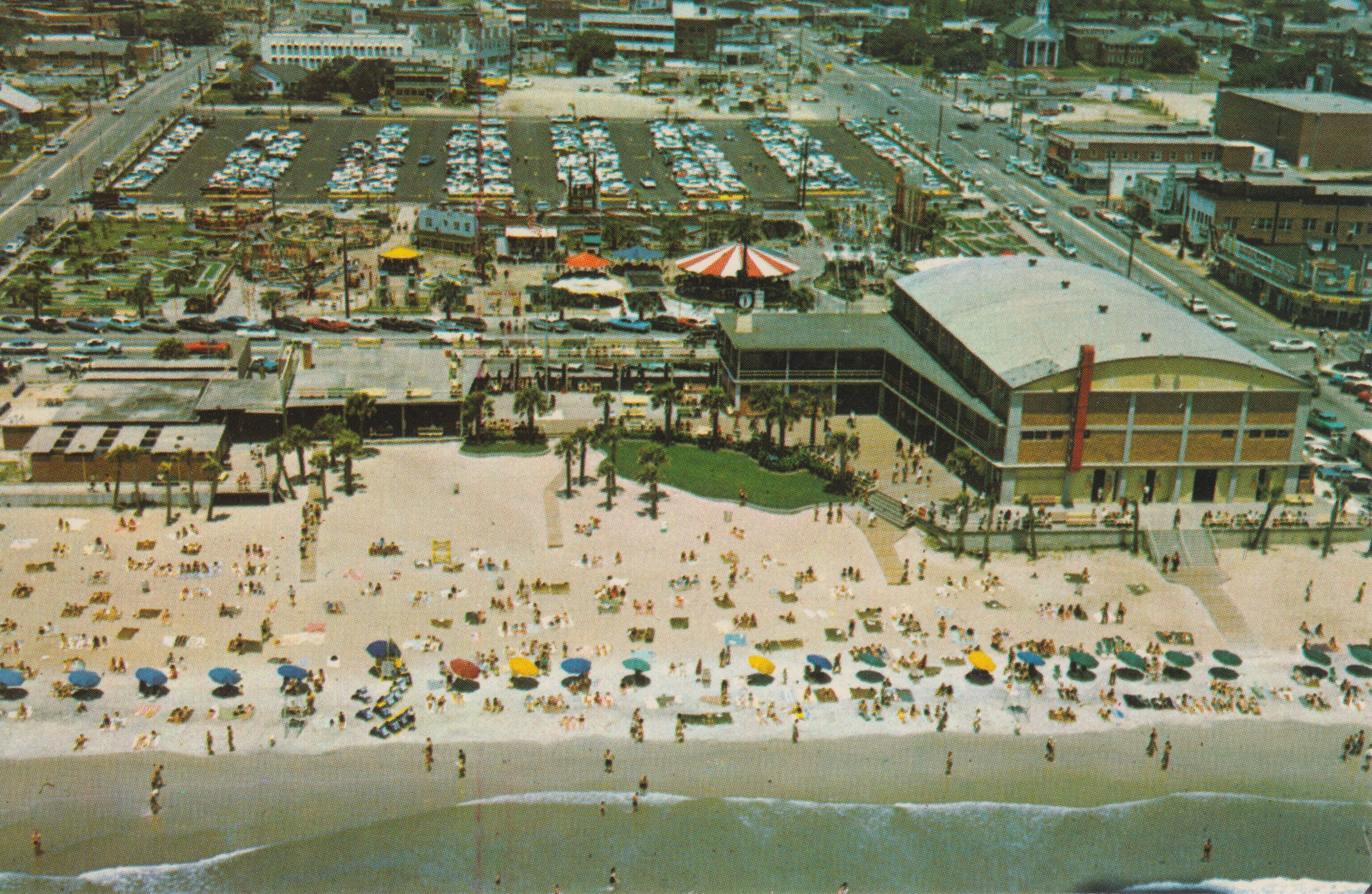
The pavilion and amusement park, seen in the 1950s or 1960s

In 1950, just two years after its opening, the company now called Burroughs & Chapin bought out the Central Amusement Company, the owners of the park at the time. The new owners added 14 new rides to the park and also added new concessions to the park. Over the years, the park would add and exchange numerous carnival-style flat rides, as well as suffering and fighting through several hurricanes.

Among its significant historical attractions were the Herschell-Sillman Carousel as well as the Baden Band Organ. The Carousel itself dates back to 1912, and include numerous types of animals such as: frogs, lions, ostriches, zebras, giraffes, and even dragons instead of using the classical horses. The only horse found on the carousel is the "lead horse." which was decorated in great detail and was located on the outside row of the ride. Even though the area has unfriendly weather and climatic condition near the beach, the carousel has been maintained well over the years and it still continues to operate to this day at Pavilion Nostalgia at Broadway At The Beach and is one of only 15 working Herschell-Spillman carousels in the country.

The Baden Band Organ was originally hand-built, decorated and crafted by A. Ruth & Sohn in Waldkirch Baden, Germany for display at the 1900 World Exposition in Paris. After the World Exposition the organ traveled all around Europe on a wagon and in 1954 Myrtle Beach Farms bought it for The Pavilion. Its "twirling figures and cherubs that play cymbals, bells and drums" entertained people for decades. The organ used cardboard music, had over 400 pipes, 98 keys, and was 20 feet wide, 11 feet high and 7 feet deep, making it a giant organ that also weighed two tons.

Beside the numerous carnival-style Flat rides and a variety of Kiddie rides normally found at Carnivals, fairs or amusement parks, there was a log flume ride, a River rafting ride called the HydroSURGE, a Haunted Hotel dark ride, and was the home to six roller coasters during the Pavilions nearly 60 year life. The first rollercoaster was received in 1951 and was called Comet Jr, which was a pint sized wooden coaster that was built by National Amusement Devices Company that remained at the park until the late 1960s. The park also had a S.D.C. Galaxi model roller coaster at one point, which was simply called Galaxi that was removed from the park in 1997. One of the smaller coaster front the park had a train-themed Mack family coaster called the Little Eagle that opened in 1986. The Arrow Dynamics' Mad Mouse wild mouse coaster opened in 1998 which replaced the Galaxi that was removed from the park a year earlier. After the closure of the park, both of these small coasters were moved to the NASCAR Speedpark in also in Myrtle Beach.

In 1978, the park added its first major coaster, which was the steel looping Corkscrew, also built by Arrow Development, that had been relocated to the Pavilion from the Magic Harbor amusement park. The coaster featured a 70-foot drop, as well as double corkscrews along the rides 1,250 foot long course. After it was in operation for 31 years at the park it was closed and relocated to the Salitre Magico park in Colombia in order to make way for the parks new signature coaster, Hurricane: Category 5 (known as "Hurricane" for short) that was built by Custom Coasters International (CCI) at a total cost of $6 million. The "Hurricane" was a 3,800-foot long, hybrid-structure coaster that featured an out-and-back style layout that included 14 turns and double helices at each, a 100-foot drop, and a top speed of 55 mph. It opened in 2000. At the time of the parks closing in 2006, the "Hurricane" was scrapped, but the Gerstlauer trains ride was purchased by Kings Island to use on their modified Son of Beast coaster.

Just shortly before the start of the 2006 operation season, Burroughs & Chapin the owner of the Pavilion announced that the 2006 would be the park's final operating season. The park officially held its last public operating day on September 24, 2006, but held a special "Last Ride" event for select participants on September 30. The announcement of the closure of the park lead to the park to see record profits as well as attendance, but there was no hope to try to save the park due to what the parks owners called to "financial instability."

While both the Haunted Hotel and Hurricane roller coaster were demolished following closure of the parks, not all of The Pavilion was lost. The parks carousel along with the Baden Band Organ, and several other small parks were relocated to "mini-park," called the Pavilion Nostalgia Park that is located at Broadway at the Beach also in Myrtle Beach, that opened in 2007. Even though the area where the Pavilion used to be still sits vacant, and several nearby business have been devastated by the loss, both the Pavilion Nostalgia Park and a commemorative historical marker will not allow The Pavilion's memory and history to be lost.

The slogan for the Farewell Season was "One More Ride, One More Thrill, One More Memory, One Last Time."

== Closure ==
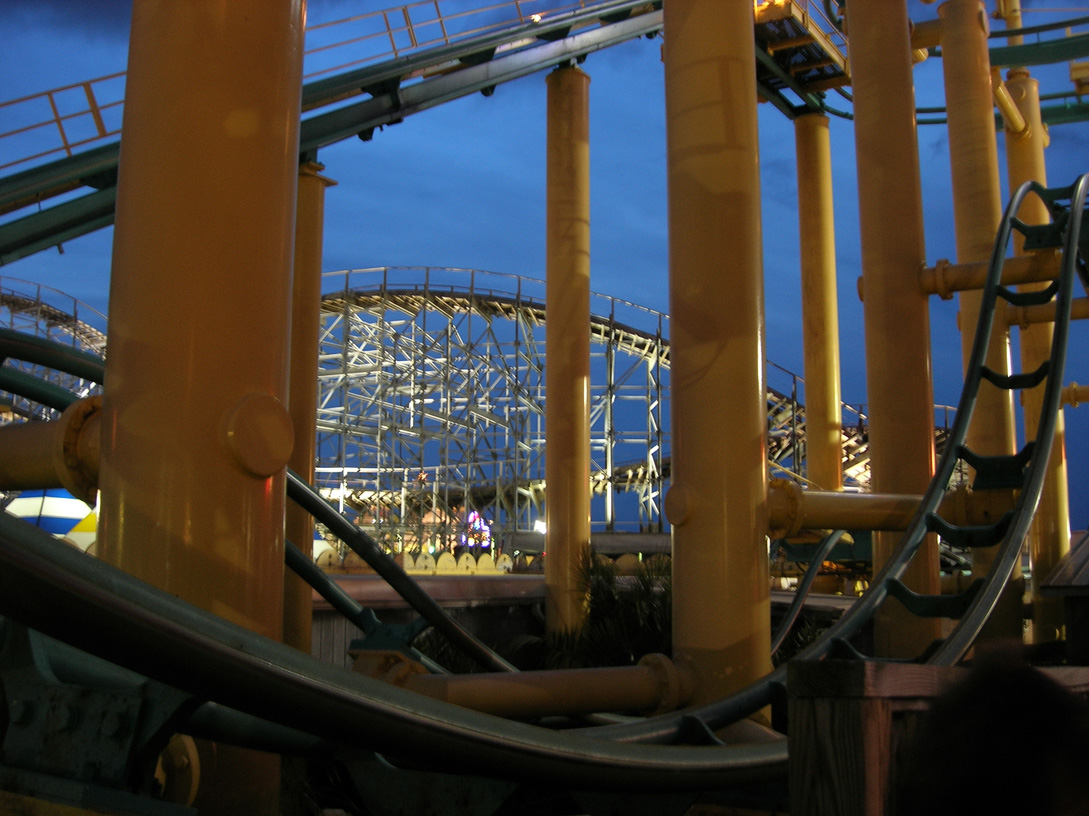
Mad Mouse and Hurricane

The owners of the Pavilion, Burroughs & Chapin, announced shortly before its 2006 opening that that would be its final season. The cause of the park's closure was due to financial issues. The 2006 season ended for the public on September 24, 2006, although a select number of people were able to participate in a "Last Ride" event held on September 30, 2006. The farewell season proved extremely popular and the park enjoyed record attendance and profits. Several online petitions were circulated in hopes of saving the Pavilion, but Burroughs & Chapin stated that financial instability would force them to shut down park operations. At about the time the closing was announced, construction on the Hard Rock Park (later renamed Freestyle Music Park and also in Myrtle Beach) was set to begin, which would also later close.

The park's historic carousel and the Baden Band Organ were subsequently relocated to Broadway at the Beach, also in Myrtle Beach; however, the Haunted Hotel and the multimillion-dollar Hurricane were demolished. Hurricane's trains were sold to Kings Island in Mason, Ohio, and were used on Son of Beast until its closure and eventual demolition in 2009 and 2012, respectively.

A new, smaller "mini-park" called the Pavilion Nostalgia Park has been created, featuring a few of the old rides and attractions, including the carousel and organ. This park, located at Broadway at the Beach, opened July 4, 2007. The organ was moved in June 2014 to where it could no longer be seen, and people complained, but Burroughs & Chapin planned to find a new location for it.

The ocean-front Pavilion and the amusement park area were demolished between December 2006 and summer 2007. As of 2010, the 11-acre (45,000 m^{2}) lot had been mostly unused and empty. Although there is no longer a Pavilion, tourists still visit the area, attracted by the local businesses such as the Gay Dolphin Gift Cove which remain in operation. A historical marker commemorating the Pavilion has been placed on the northeast corner of the ocean-front lot, along the new boardwalk.

== Rides and attractions ==
=== Roller coasters ===
| Name | Opened | Removed | Manufacturer | Type | Notes |
|---|---|---|---|---|---|
| Hurricane: Category 5 | 2000 | 2006 | Custom Coasters International | Wood/Steel Hybrid | |
| Mad Mouse | 1998 | 2006 | Arrow Dynamics | Mad Mouse | |
| Little Eagle | 1986 | 2006 | Mack Rides | Kiddie Coaster | |
| Galaxi | 1985 | 1997 | | Wooden | |

=== Flat rides ===
| Name | Opened | Removed | Manufacturer | Type | Notes |
|---|---|---|---|---|---|
| Atlantic Speedway | | 2006 | | | |
| Calypso | | 2006 | Schwarzkopf | Calypso | |
| Carousel | | 2006 | | Carousel | |
| Caterpillar | | 2006 | Mack Rides | Caterpillar | |
| Enterprise | 1980 | 2006 | Huss | Enterprise | |
| Go-Kart Track | | 2006 | | | |
| Haunted House | | 2006 | | | |
| Hydrosurge | 1993 | 2006 | Hopkins Rides | River Raft Ride | |
| Log Flume | | 2006 | | Log Flume | |
| Pirate | | 2006 | Huss | Pirate Ship | |
| Rainbow | 1984 | 2006 | Huss | Gondola | For Sale 2012/Location Now Unknown |
| Starship 2000 | 1980's | 2006 | | | |

== New uses for the site ==
On February 7, 2012, the Sun News reported that the Myrtle Beach area would have a new attraction by summer. Adrenaline Adventures planned a zip line project that would go up at the former Pavilion site and was expected to open April 1.

On April 10, 2013, the Sun News reported that rides and games could return to the old Myrtle Beach Pavilion Amusement Park site that summer. Strates Shows in Orlando, Florida was proposing a temporary carnival to sit on a four-acre portion of the old Pavilion site next to the Adrenaline Adventures Zip Line, but due to resistance from the city, the plan was dropped.

On May 4, 2017, the owner of Myrtle Beach Zipline Adventures announced additional zip lines and the addition of a ropes course, to be completed in about a month. The zip lines were high enough that concerts could continue under them. The zip line attraction closed in January 2024.

Burroughs and Chapin Pavilion Place between 8th and 9th Avenues North became an event and concert venue. Carolina Country Music Fest is an annual event held there.
