= Chance Morgan =

American amusement ride manufacturer

- Company type: Private
- Industry: Amusement ride manufacturing
- Founded: 2001
- Headquarters: Wichita, Kansas
- Key people: Richard H. (Harold) Chance; Richard G. (Dick) Chance; Michael Chance
- Products: Roller coasters, Ferris wheels, thrill rides, family rides, gentle rides
- Parent: Chance Rides
- Website: www.chancemorgan.com

Chance Morgan Coasters, Inc. is a roller coaster and amusement ride manufacturer. It was formed on June 14, 2001 when Michael Chance, grandson of Chance Rides founder Richard H. Chance, acquired the assets of roller coaster builder D. H. Morgan Manufacturing of La Selva Beach, California.

At the time, Chance Rides was going through bankruptcy reorganization and neither Chance Industries nor Chance Rides had any equity in the company. Michael Chance was the main investor along with a few silent partners. The company operated separately for a few years under the Chance Morgan name and handled the sales for Chance Rides Manufacturing.

== Chance Rides ==
In 2011, Chance Morgan reintroduced the Chance Rides brand name in its marketing efforts, in celebration of the 50th anniversary of the founding of Chance Manufacturing Co., Inc. in 1961 by Harold Chance.

== Roller coasters ==
- Superman el Último Escape at Six Flags México (Note: Sold by D.H. Morgan but manufactured and installed under the Chance Morgan brand.)
- Steel Lasso at Frontier City (Note: Manufactured by Chance Morgan under license from Vekoma.)

== Ferris wheels ==
Notable examples include:

- Niagara SkyWheel (2006)
- Myrtle Beach SkyWheel (2011)

== See also ==
- Category:Amusement rides manufactured by Chance Morgan
- Category:Roller coasters manufactured by Chance Morgan
