= Myrtle Beach SkyWheel =

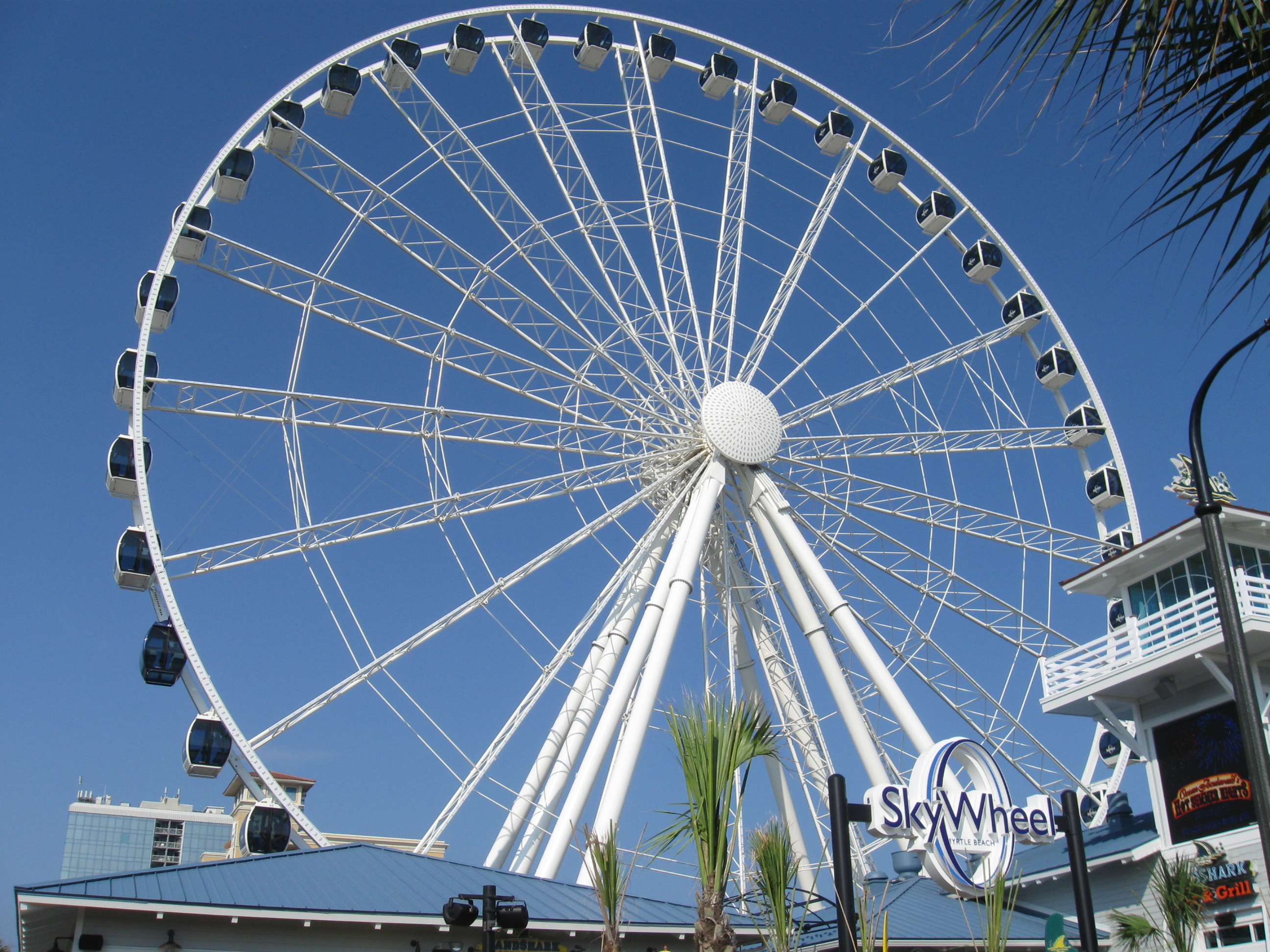

General information
- Status: Complete and operational
- Type: Ferris wheel
- Location: Myrtle Beach, South Carolina, Oceanfront Boardwalk and Promenade
- Coordinates: 33.692035°N 78.87954°W
- Construction started: 2011
- Completed: 2011
- Inaugurated: May 20, 2011
- Cost: $12 million

Height
- Height: 187 feet (57 m)

Design and construction
- Architect: Ronald Bussink Professional Rides
- Engineer: Chance Morgan

The Myrtle Beach Skywheel is a 187-foot-tall (57.0 m) observation wheel located in Myrtle Beach, South Carolina, that opened May 20, 2011. At the time of its opening it was the second-tallest extant Ferris wheel in North America, after the 212-foot (64.6 m) Texas Star in Dallas, and the tallest wheel in the United States east of the Mississippi River. It is now the sixth-tallest Ferris wheel in the United States.

== Design and safety ==
SkyWheel is a Ronald Bussink Professional Rides designed R60 Giant Wheel, and was manufactured by Chance Morgan. It is similar in design to the Niagara SkyWheel on Canada's side of Niagara Falls, and the Seattle Great Wheel, both of which are 175 feet (53.3 m) tall. Skywheel has "42 glass-enclosed, temperature controlled gondolas" described as "ballooned-out square", each with seating for six passengers. City manager Tom Leath said, "It's big enough to be an iconic feature for the city."

The wheel operates year-round except for Thanksgiving and Christmas.

Each gondola must be removed if high winds are predicted, completing a process that takes around eight to ten hours.

Each gondola is equipped with temperature-controlled air conditioner units with hatch windows that allow airflow into the gondola. The gondolas are also equipped with a red "Emergency" button that alerts the ride operator.

Unrelated people are not required to sit together.

If a child were to ride without their parents or guardian, they must be able to reach the top of the gondola where the emergency button is located. If the child does not meet this requirement, a staff member can be provided to ride with the child or the child may ride with another customer with the consent of the adult.

== Location and description ==
St. Louis-based developer Koch Development Company and Pacific Development had been looking for a site for a Ferris wheel; they chose Myrtle Beach because of its new boardwalk, which has its northern end near the site, next to Plyler Park. Architect James Hubbard, AIA a principal with Pegram Associates, Inc. designed the site, which includes a 5,400-square-foot (500 m^{2}) building with a restaurant, gift shop and the ticket booth. The Golden Villas motel was torn down and an alley was moved. Prior to the 1970s, the Gause family operated Ocean Terrace in the same location, and the Seaside Hotel next door.

The September 8, 2010, meeting of the Myrtle Beach Downtown Redevelopment Corporation included a discussion of SkyWheel. TLC planned a show about the wheel's construction, and a camera was positioned above the site at the Slingshot reverse bungee attraction across Ocean Boulevard. Al Mers, a Pacific Development partner, said later in the month that the steel frame was being built outside St. Louis, while the gondolas were made in Switzerland. The wheel went on a deck 20 feet (6.1 m) above sea level to protect it from possible hurricane storm surge. Construction of the building started in December, while the wheel's frame began work on February 23. Land Shark Bar & Grill opened the same day as SkyWheel, the third restaurant in the city connected with Jimmy Buffett. The others are Jimmy Buffett's Margaritaville at Broadway at the Beach and Cheeseburger in Paradise on the city's north end.

== Renovation ==
The SkyWheel closed in January 2021 and was taken apart and shipped to Wichita, Kansas, where it was renovated for its 10th anniversary later that year. Upgrades include new floors and seats in the gondolas and a new logo and lights on the center globe. The attraction will also have the ability to do safe gender reveals, and more light shows are planned.

On March 18, 2021, renovations had reached the halfway point. Sections of the SkyWheel were returned starting on April 14, and by April 23 the SkyWheel was reassembled, with some maintenance required ahead of its 10th birthday later that month. The official reopening took place May 20.

On May 19, 2021, first responders as well as other heroes from around the region were the first people to ride the SkyWheel before it officially opened to the public on May 20, 2021.

== Incidents ==
Overnight on April 28, 2022, after the SkyWheel closed there was a small fire on the property that damaged a part of the loading deck as well as a nearby gondola which caused the Skywheel to be closed until repairs could be made and a complete safety inspection completed. No crew members were on site at the time and there were no injuries to the public. The SkyWheel reopened after 3:00 pm on May 2, 2022 after passing its safety inspection to operate. The damaged gondola was removed and the damaged part of the deck was blocked off. On July 18, 2022, it was announced that the fire was caused by flammable varnish which was applied to the deck; there is no evidence of arson.

=== Summer 2022 technical issues ===
On Sunday, August 21, 2022, just after 5:30 p.m., the Myrtle Beach Fire Department responded to the SkyWheel due to a report of passengers being stuck on the wheel. The SkyWheel had to be manually operated in order to help two families safely off the ride. It was unclear how long they were trapped and no injuries were reported. On Monday, August 21, 2021, the SkyWheel reopened at 1 pm.

== Honors ==
In 2012, Officialbestof.com named SkyWheel "Best Scenic Experience in South Carolina".

On January 13, 2021, it was announced that the SkyWheel will be lit blue in honor of Lance Corporal Melton "Fox" Gore of the Horry County Police Department who was struck and killed by a vehicle while he was cleaning up debris from an accident that occurred near Highway 22. Gore served as an officer for the department for more than 20 years.
