= Gay Dolphin Gift Cove =

Gift shop in South Carolina, US

Coordinates: 33°41′34″N 78°52′42″W

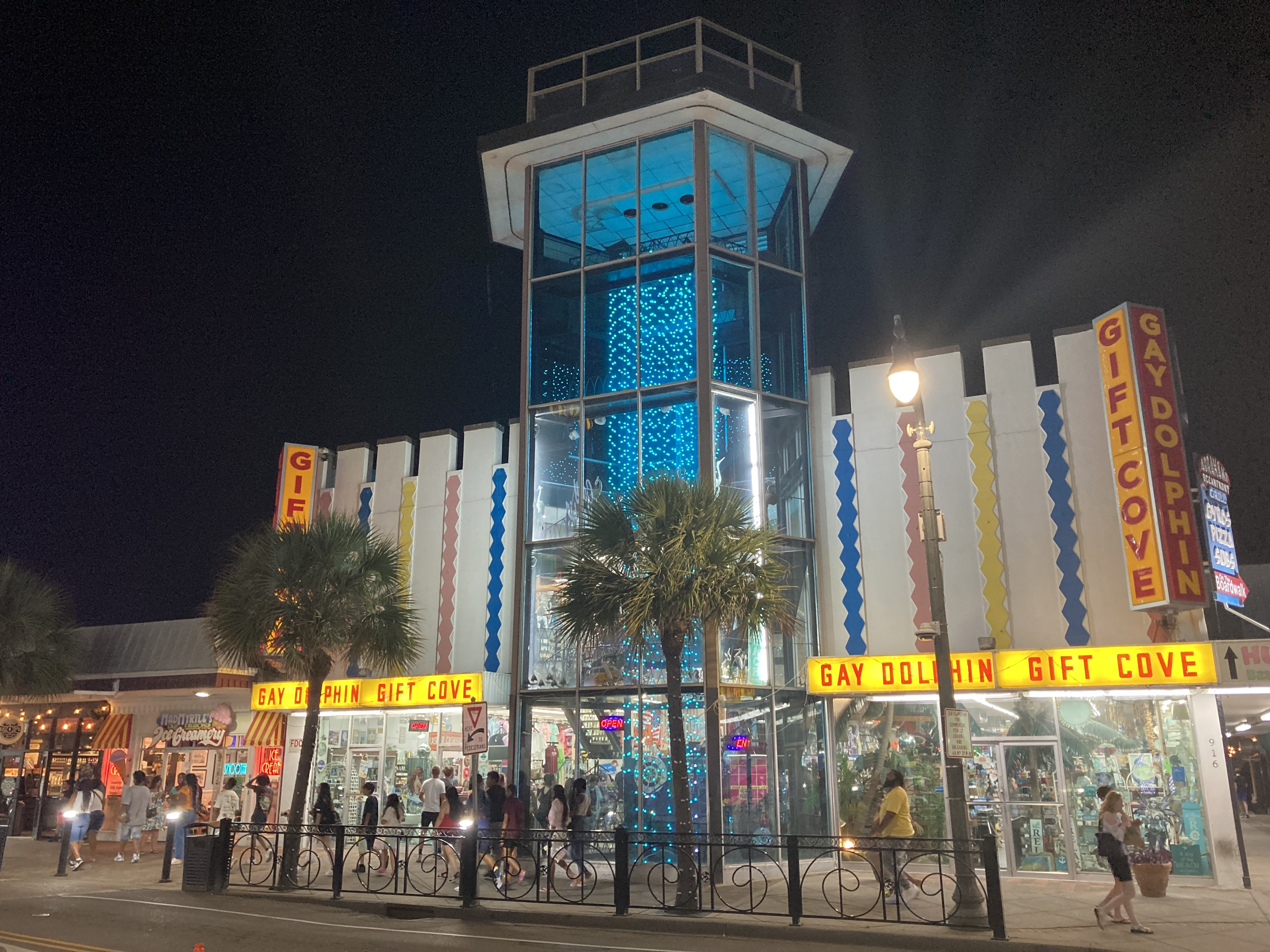
The Gay Dolphin Gift Cove, seen in 2023.

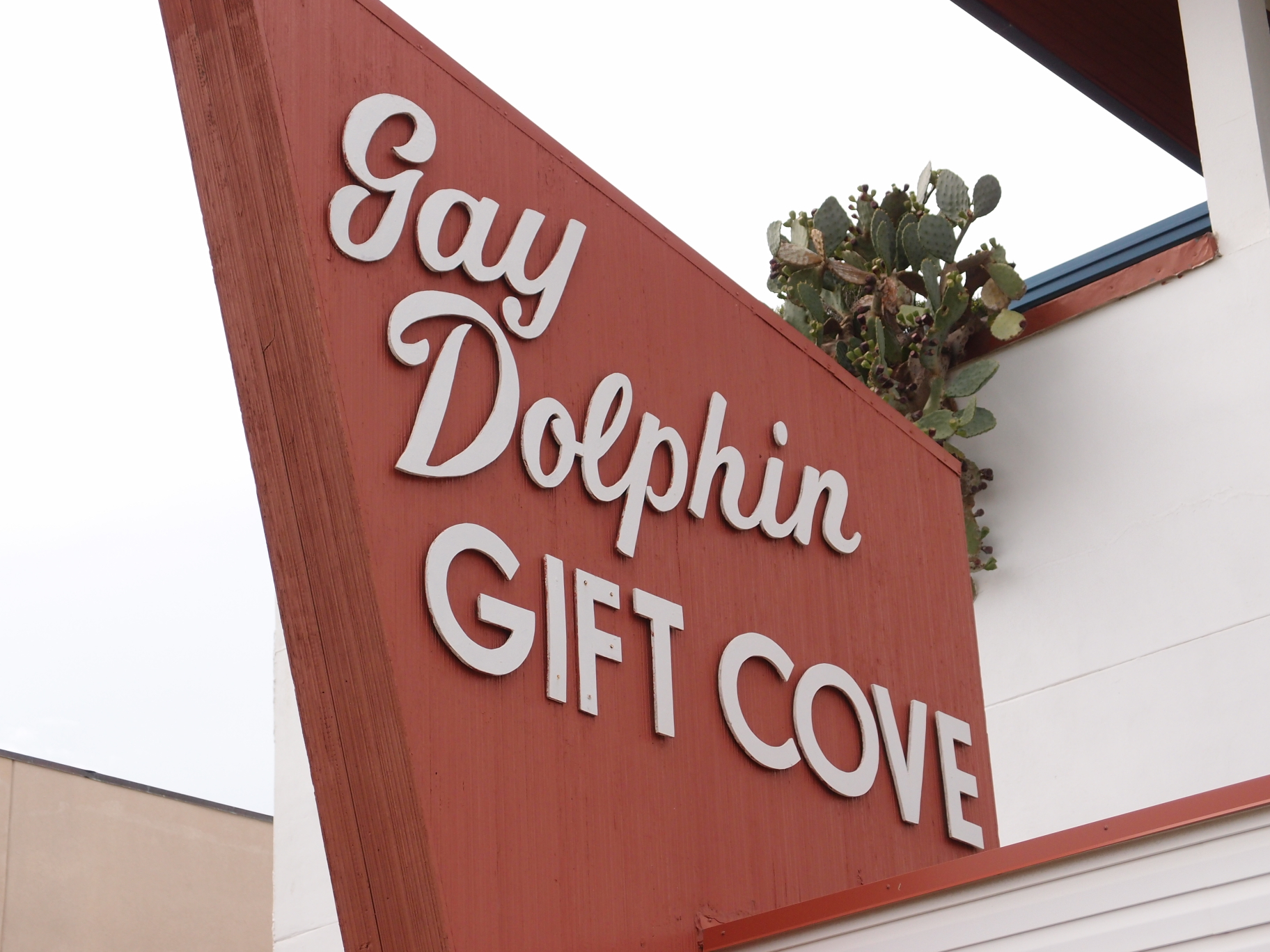
One of the signs outside the Gay Dolphin Gift Cove.

The Gay Dolphin Gift Cove is located at 916 North Ocean Boulevard in Myrtle Beach, South Carolina, United States, and calls itself "the nation's largest gift shop". As of 2011, the Gay Dolphin had 26,000 square feet (2,400 m^{2}) and store owner Justin "Buz" Plyler said the store averaged 70,000 items.

== Description ==
The store is four stories tall with ten levels because Justin Plyler, according to his son, could not afford to remove the hill between the street and the beach. The store has 50 sections called "coves", including an Elvis Cove where a person can take a photo with a life-size Elvis Presley. Items include "sea shells, brushes for bald men and noisy seat cushions." Larger items have included a fountain with three dolphins costing $7,000 and a life-size cigar store Indian. Tom Pierce's Trader Bill's Shark's Tooth Cove, named after the first owner Bill Swanson, rents space in the building. People can bring in their own shark teeth and have them made into jewelry. As of 2025, Pierce had 56 years of experience in the field. Co-owner Michelle Plyler said the top selling item was name tags, of which a wall had 3000 names, updated every year and ordered based on the Social Security Administration list of top names. Myrtle Beach T-shirts were another popular item. Buz Plyler said in 2023 about 50 people worked in the store and that it had "more items than Sears Roebuck had in its heyday" and "more items than you’ll find in a Walmart Superstore".

== History ==
Justin Whitaker Plyler and Eloise Plyler opened the Gay Dolphin in 1946 next to the Kiddieland amusement park, which evolved from attractions first set up in 1939. The Plylers lived in an apartment at the top of the current building for 45 years. Justin Plyler Sr. "wanted a whimsical nautical name for his store", according to his son Buz, born three years after the store opened. Hurricane Hazel in 1954 destroyed the original store, which was rebuilt on the same site, starting near the beach. Eventually, the store completed a six-story glass tower next to Ocean Boulevard. Buz Plyler, born in 1949, started working for his parents at age 8, doing the jobs his father disliked and eventually buying all of the store's merchandise. As of 2011, he had dealt with some sellers for fifty years. Plyler also purchases merchandise from bankrupt suppliers at a discount. The Gay Dolphin was the first tourist-oriented store to stay open year-round.

At one time the store sold baby alligators, which became too expensive, but later the store sold small turtles and hermit crabs. The amusement park, which included the Wild Mouse roller coaster, closed in the 1970s because of one man's reckless behavior on the roller coaster.

An annex used to be located across Ocean Boulevard, but it has been replaced by Ripley's Haunted Adventure. A sign with wooden dolphins remains there, despite the city's efforts to have it removed. It went up in the 1970s but had to come down for Hurricane Hugo. Although a 1979 zoning law said such a sign could not be replaced even if taken down for repairs, it went back up in 1994.

For many years, people could climb the circular steel steps to the top of the glass tower, at one time the city's tallest building, and see the view of Myrtle Beach from the roof. The cost was $1 as of 2000. However, persons unable to find their name on the wall of bicycle license plates could climb up without charge. The tower once housed The Wonder Falls--oil-rain structures that created waterfall illusions and ran through barrels on the ceiling to the wishing well below. The pump broke in the early 2000s, forcing the store to get rid of the Wonder Falls since they had no way to replace the parts. The store added lights to the tower in 2019. Liability and insurance claim concerns put an end to the practice of climbing the tower in 2006.

Eloise Plyler worked for the store until she died in 2009.

The concrete walkway that was called the Boardwalk, which was later extended and upgraded, ran from the Myrtle Beach Pavilion past the Gay Dolphin to Plyler Park (see below). With the completion of the Myrtle Beach Boardwalk in 2010, the Gay Dolphin made improvements to its entrance from the boardwalk.

== Honoring the store's co-founder ==
Justin Plyler Sr. died in March 2002. Earlier that year, a $1.5 million upgrade to 11th Avenue North was nearly complete, and the street was renamed Mr. Joe White Avenue.

At the end of Mr. Joe White Avenue, where Castaways Motel, Myrtle Beach National Wax Museum and two beachwear stores were located, a park was planned next to the ocean. In 2000, Myrtle Beach City Council had approved the purchase of 0.85 acres for the park, in exchange for several alleys near existing motels that planned expansions, plus cash. The buildings on the site had leases until 2002, after which they could be torn down. The park was dedicated to the elder Justin Plyler at the Sun Fun Festival on June 3, 2005.

With the opening of the Boardwalk in 2010, Plyler Park became the location of a concert series called "Hot Summer Nights". Myrtle Beach SkyWheel, the largest Ferris wheel in the eastern United States at the time of its construction, opened next to the park in 2011.
