= Myrtle Beach Boardwalk =

Boardwalk in Myrtle Beach, South Carolina

Coordinates: 33.6926°N 78.8790°W

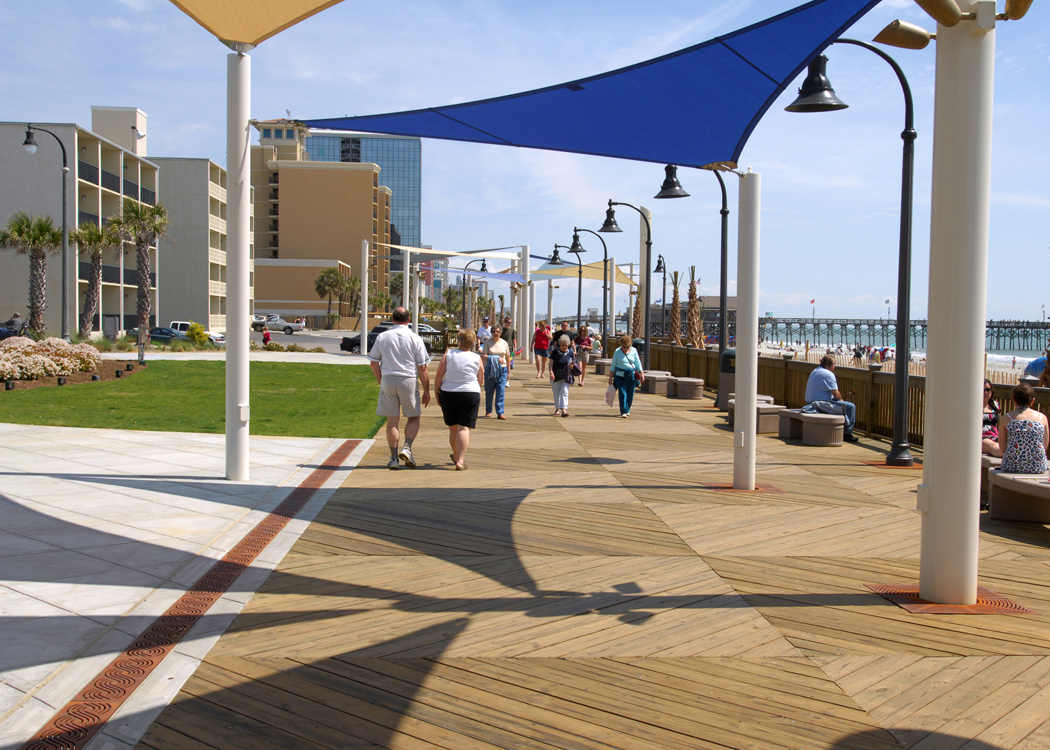
Myrtle Beach Boardwalk

The Myrtle Beach Boardwalk & Promenade, located in Myrtle Beach, South Carolina, runs 1.2 miles (1.9 km) along the oceanfront from the Pier 14 at 14th Avenue North to the 2nd Avenue Pier at 2nd Avenue North. The promenade officially opened in May 2010 at a cost of nearly $6.4 million. National Geographic has ranked Myrtle Beach Boardwalk number three in the United States, while Travel and Leisure ranked the boardwalk number two.

== Description ==
The northern section, 8 feet (2.4 m) wide with a raised wooden deck design, runs from Pier 14 to Plyler Park, the location of "Hot Summer Nights", with live music twice a week during the summer, and weekly attractions that include a "Kids Carnival", bagpipes, and a Dixieland band. The middle section, from Plyler Park to the former site of Myrtle Beach Pavilion, has "a carnival atmosphere accompanied by restaurants, bars and gift shops". The Southern Promenade, from the former Pavilion to 2nd Avenue Pier, city officials describe as a "meandering oceanfront park" with benches and landscaping. The 2nd Avenue Pier is the location of weekly fireworks. The contractor responsible for constructing the MB Boardwalk Project is M.B. Kahn Construction Co., Inc., according to city officials, used close to 770,000 board-feet of lumber, 555,000 screws, and 300,000 nails. The city contributed 600 palmetto trees and 50,000 beach grass seedlings.

== History ==
The first boardwalk in what would later be called Myrtle Beach connected its first hotel, the Sea Side Inn, and the first of several pavilions.

Myrtle Beach had a wooden boardwalk in the 1930s. After being upgraded with concrete in 1940, with plans to expand it delayed by World War II, it was destroyed by Hurricane Hazel in 1954. All that remained was a concrete walkway between 9th Avenue North and 11th Avenue North, later renamed Mr. Joe White Avenue. The 1999 Pavilion Area Master Plan included a boardwalk. When the Pavilion closed in 2006 after 58 years, area merchants wanted an attraction to replace it. A mile-long boardwalk had been discussed for several years, but the estimated cost was $10 million, and even if construction started in 2007, it would not be complete until 2010. A major storm could also damage the new attraction. David Sebok, executive director of the Myrtle Beach Downtown Redevelopment Corporation, said "Most tourists expect a boardwalk ... and we really don't have one to speak of."

The city allocated $285,000 for design, and The LandArt Co. made preliminary sketches that included benches and planters. By 2007, the cost estimate had risen to $12 million and the start date was Fall 2008. The city was considering several payment methods. City manager Tom Leath wanted a tax district where businesses nearby would pay more because they would benefit more, while some believed the entire city should contribute since the boardwalk would be good for everyone. Opponents of the tax district wondered if small businesses could pay. Some people worried about crime and vagrants.

A design with "a traditional wood-plank walkway" and "a meandering concrete sidewalk ... with wooden crosswalks to the beach, colorful shade sails and public parks" was presented to city council Aug. 14, 2007, but funding was still not set. Burroughs & Chapin, which had torn down the Pavilion building and cleared the 11-acre (45,000 m^{2}) site of the amusement park over the previous year, agreed to pay for the section across the 11-acre (45,000 m^{2}) Pavilion site, using a design matching that in the other areas.

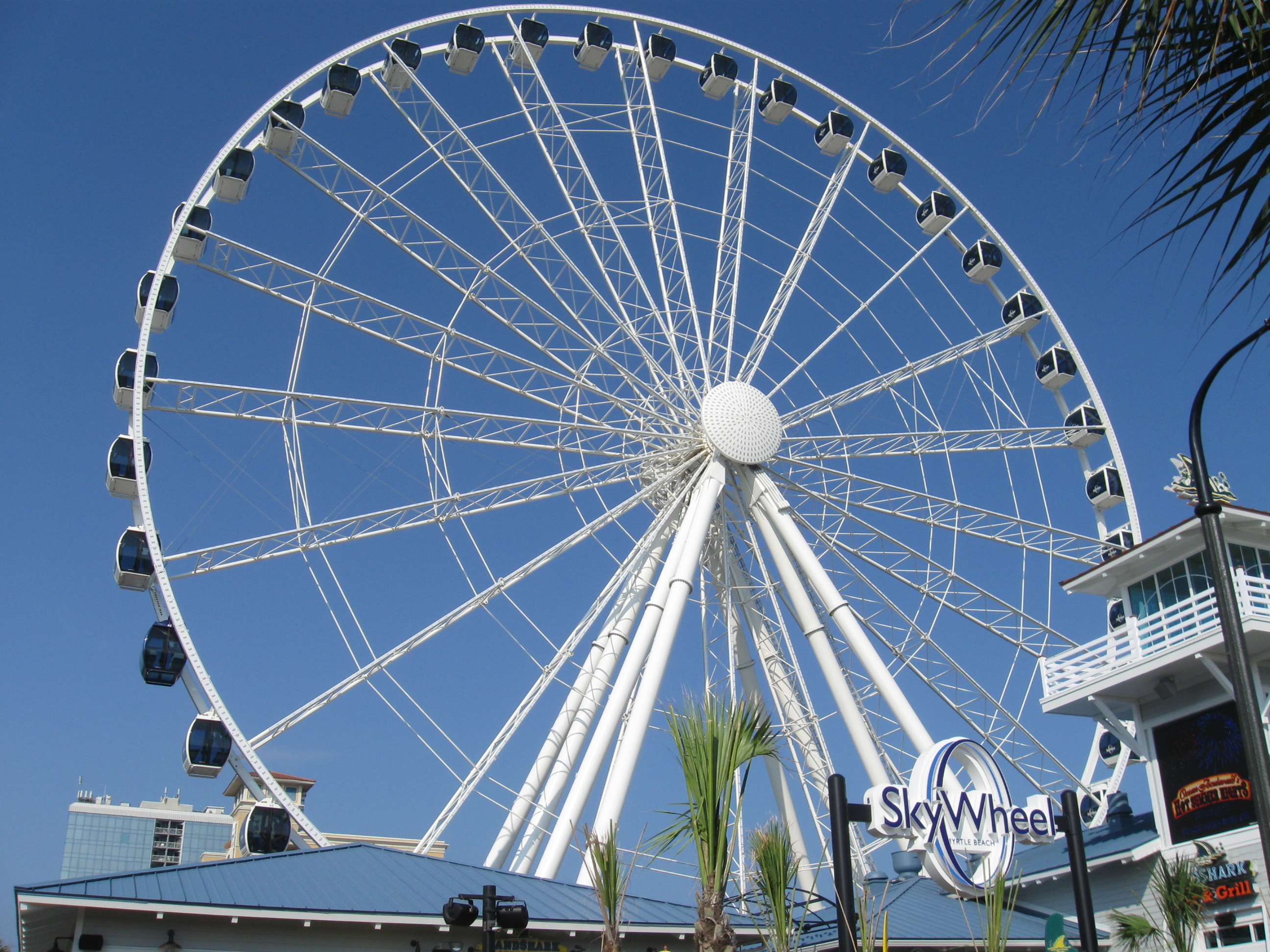
Myrtle Beach SkyWheel

Groundbreaking took place in September 2009, despite a dispute between the city and Burroughs & Chapin, with a question over whether the company would pay for its section. Nevertheless, the company supported the boardwalk and expected its plans for the Pavilion site would benefit. The cost of the project had been cut in half, mainly due to the economic slowdown, making companies more eager to get work. A controversial sales tax for tourism promotion has made it possible, without raising property taxes in the area, to pay off bonds the city issued to finance the project.

The boardwalk was finished from 14th Avenue to 4th Avenue early in April. The boardwalk opened in May 2010 with a ribbon-cutting held May 15 as part of the Beach Music Festival. It attracted people from the area and across the country who had not been downtown in years. The southernmost section, beyond 4th Avenue, was not complete until June.

On December 1, 2011, the Myrtle Beach Community Appearance Board saw plans for a new restaurant and park north of 14th Avenue North, which could include an extension of the boardwalk, but it was not known who would pay to add to the boardwalk. On January 24, 2012, the city council agreed to allow alleys to be moved, creating space for the new park. Coastal Dining planned to build the Banditos Mexican restaurant where the Breakwater Inn was before its demolition, and to pay part of the $420,000 cost of the boardwalk extension as well as connecting 15th Avenue North to Ocean Boulevard. The 425-foot (130 m) extension was completed in 2013.

On November 8, 2012 at a meeting of people involved in making the boardwalk possible, Mayor John Rhodes stated a goal of spending $20 million to extend the boardwalk to a length of 4.6 miles (7.4 km). This would make the boardwalk longer than the one in Atlantic City, New Jersey. The city would ask companies and organizations to contribute the money. If the city approved the plan, the boardwalk would start two miles further south at Springmaid Pier, and it would end one mile farther north. Also, boardwalk designer Mike Wooten stated his interest in widening the boardwalk, which would require action by the South Carolina legislature. In 2013, a presentation was made to the city council.

The Myrtle Beach Downtown Redevelopment Corporation voted on April 16, 2014 to plan for a municipal improvement district in which extra property taxes would be paid. After this was approved in 2022, the revenue could be used for projects that would help downtown. Private sponsorships, however, were the preferred means of financing extensions.

In 2022, $3.7 million in improvements were made to the boardwalk, including replacing southern yellow pine with weather-resistant composite materials and wooden railings in some areas.

== National attention ==
Even during the boardwalk's construction, the national media showed interest in the boardwalk. CBS' The Early Show, including meteorologist Dave Price, broadcast live on May 14, 2010, the weekend of the official opening. Team Sandtastic made a sand sculpture of Price. Also, Cake Boss Buddy Valastro from TLC helped produce a 10-foot 1200-pound cake in the shape of a flip-flop, made in Hoboken, New Jersey, and delivered to the May opening ceremony. The episode aired October 25, 2010. Travel and Leisure named Myrtle Beach Boardwalk the number two boardwalk mainly because of the entertainers, and The Today Show featured the report. On July 14, 2010, National Geographic ranked the Myrtle Beach Boardwalk behind the boardwalks at Atlantic City, New Jersey and Coney Island, and calling it "the town's hub of activity". Myrtle Beach Area Chamber of Commerce president Brad Dean estimated that publicity resulting from the boardwalk reached the equivalent of more than $1 million.

== Festivals ==
- Boardwalk Fright Nights - A Halloween themed festival.
- Carolina Country Music Festival - A country music festival, consisting of famous country music artists.
- Sun Fun Festival - A festival to kick off the summer season, consists of music, entertainment, and food.
- Winter Wonderland at the Beach - A holiday lights & festival display along the Boardwalk with nighttime lights, tree lighting, entertainment and more.
- Hot Summer Nights - This is a summer series of live music and entertainment on the Boardwalk (twice a week) along with weekly attractions.

== Reception ==
Visitors have given overwhelmingly positive reviews to the boardwalk. Despite some concerns about safety, and the lack of city money for a special boardwalk patrol, most people have felt very safe, and the police department reports few incidents. David Sebok, executive director of the Myrtle Beach Downtown Redevelopment Corporation, received calls from most business owners who opposed the boardwalk, saying they were happy now. The number of area businesses increased even before summer's end, and those who already had businesses along the boardwalk reported higher income; some reported their best July ever. Additional development includes Myrtle Beach SkyWheel near Plyler Park, which at 187 feet was at the time of its construction the tallest Ferris wheel in the United States east of the Mississippi River, and similar in design to the Niagara SkyWheel, on the Canadian side of Niagara Falls. The Collins family planned to spend $7.5 million on the Second Avenue Pier area.

On September 8, 2010, the Downtown Redevelopment Corporation met to look at the results of surveys of more than 900 people and found tourists and local people gave the boardwalk a 4.5 out of 5.
