= Hurricane (ride) =

Amusement ride

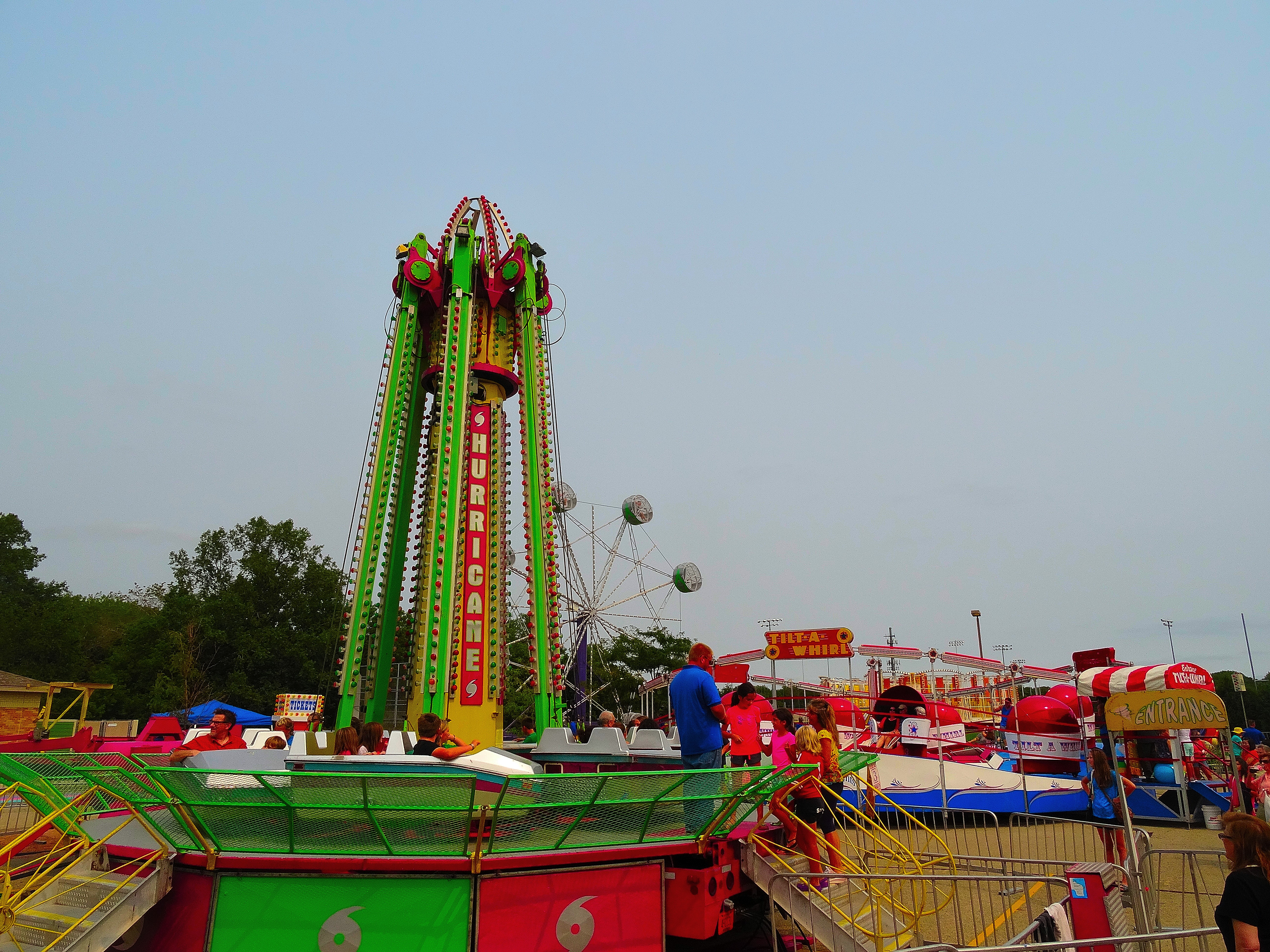
Hurricane, as manufactured by Dartron

The Hurricane is an amusement ride first manufactured by the Allan Herschell Company. The Hurricane was first created in the 1940s, first known as the Saturn 6, and was later built by Mulligan as the Hurricane. The modern versions of the Hurricane were produced by a series of related companies, including Hrubetz, Man-Co, Killinski, Dartron Industries and now Battech. Hurricanes have been licensed for production in countries other than the United States, although the number of non-U.S. constructed rides is limited.

The Hurricane is nowadays almost exclusively a traveling ride; few if any examples are present in amusement parks as standing attractions. However, several parks have operated the ride in the past, unlike the new model Downdraft, which some parks have recently bought due to its high passenger capacity and comfortable stadium-like seating.

== Design and operation ==
Six 35-foot-long (11 m) sweeps (arms) are attached to a 40-foot-tall (12 m) center tower. At the base of each sweep is a car carrying four people, in pairs sitting side-by-side. Riders are restrained by a locking lap bar, with no dividers in between the side-by-side riders (unlike the new model Downdraft with over shoulder harness and increasing passenger per car to five). Old versions of the ride did not compensate for lateral movement considering the sweeps were attached directly to the top of the cars (Saturn 6). The Hurricane and Downdraft use a car mount pivoting saddle in which the cars are placed held upright by angular retention cables mounted to the top of the rotating hub mounted to the tower via avon bearing just above the sweep bushings to compensate for lateral movement. Most operators of the Hurricane and Downdraft require riders to be 42 inches (1.1 m) tall or more, with smaller riders usually required to be seated on the inner seat of the cars due to the strong centrifugal force of the device.

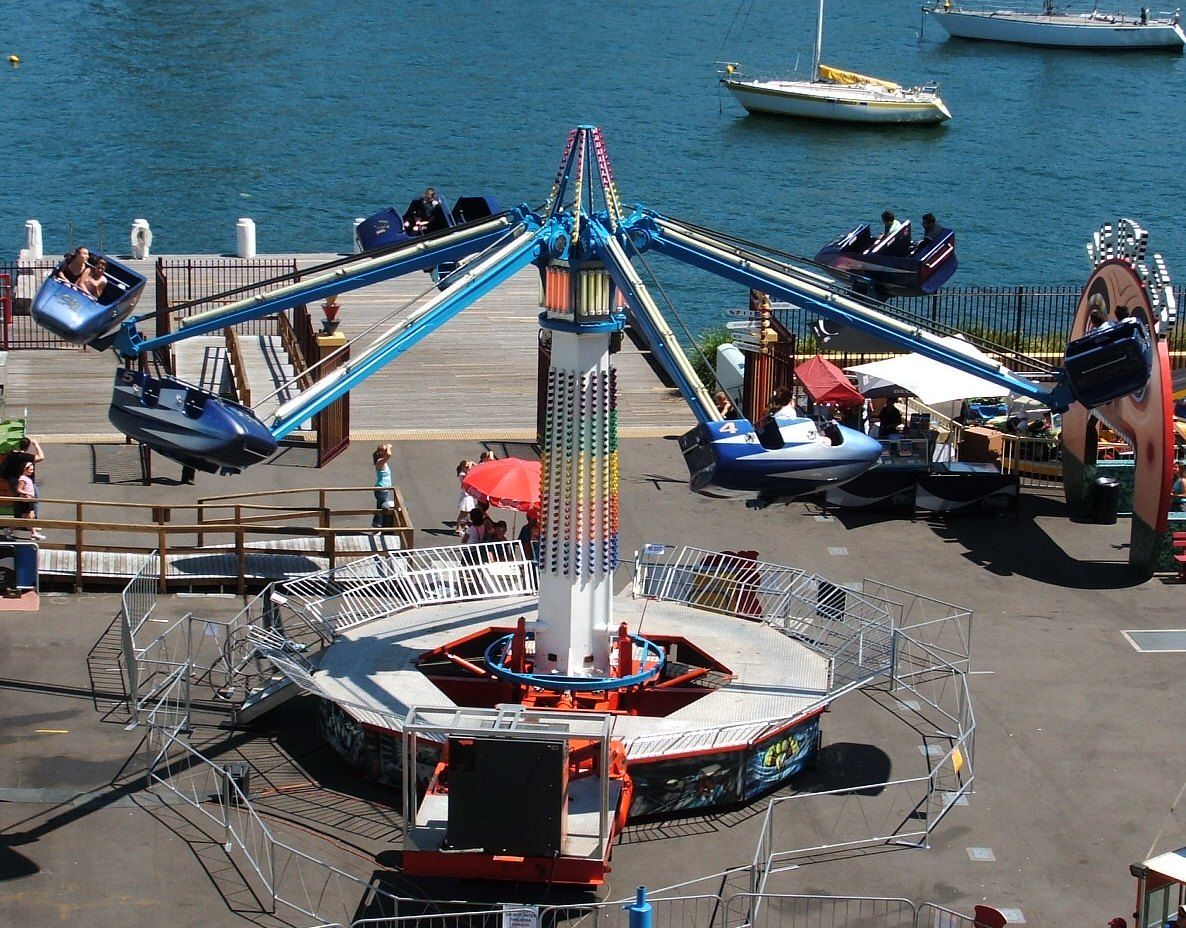
Joyland's Hurricane in operation

The ride starts off at a slow spin, propelling the sweeps upward due to both centrifugal force and a pneumatic cylinder piston with connected differential housed in the center shaft. The speed is increased until the cars reach their maximum height propelled by the motor then pneumatics are engaged. The operator will then begin to ("bounce" or "pop") the sweeps by sending the ride into a freewheel mode that cuts the ride to half drive then hitting a zoom button that fills the top portion of the center cylinder with air yanking the sweeps upward, when the operator lets off the button air is rapidly bled through the differential back to the top part of the cylinder (all extra air bleeding out a bypass pressure valve resulting in the familiar pop or blast of air complementary and well known to the ride) resulting in the sweeps dropping and using the lower supplied air from the top part of the cylinder through the differential to make a cushioned bounce until the operator zooms the sweeps upward again. This is repeated multiple times before the ride tops off to its max allowable height. The operator can then top the ride off as many times as they want by hitting the zoom every other bounce, manufacturers say doing consecutive top offs can whip the angular retention cables resulting in a slightly jerky ride. The operator can do a reverse pop of the sweeps to rapidly stabilize the bounce, disengage rotation and activate brakes until the ride begins to slow down for a roll landing on the tower rim.

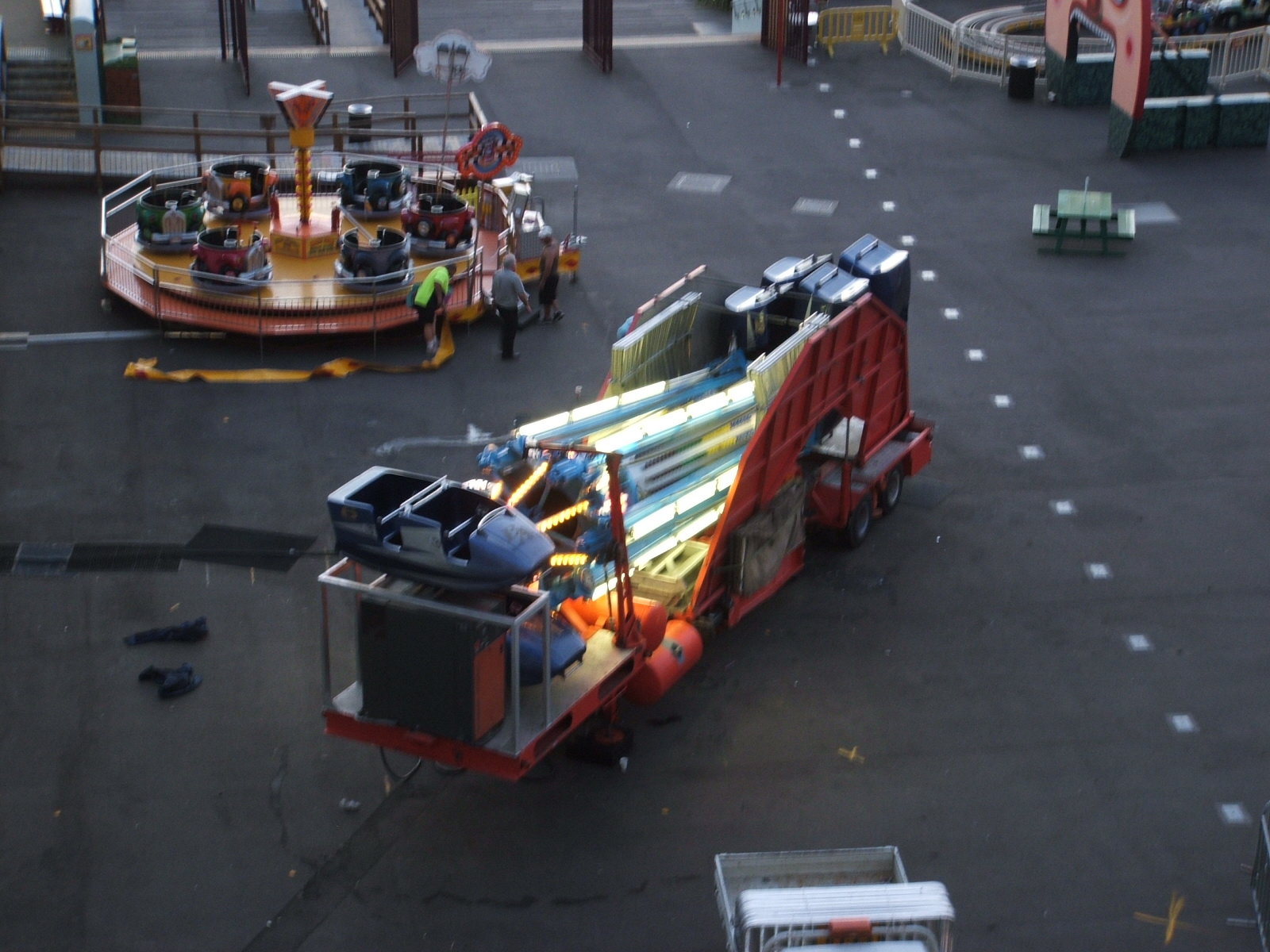
Joyland's Hurricane in the racked or transportable position pre-refurbishment

The ride racks onto a single 48-foot (15 m) trailer, and can be assembled by two people in just over two hours.

== Variants ==
Dartron has developed a floorless car version of the Hurricane. Known as the Down Draft, the ride uses shoulder restraints to hold riders, and increases the passenger capacity to five per sweep, sitting in one row of three and a row of two. The new version also includes a controlled manner emergency stop that locks remaining air in pneumatic cylinder to cushion the sweeps as not to slam tower. The Down Draft is currently manufactured by Battech Enterprises, as Dartron has since gone out of business.

== See also ==
- Octopus (ride)
