= Niagara SkyWheel =

Ferris wheel near Niagara Falls, Canada

Coordinates: 43.0909158°N 79.0759206°W

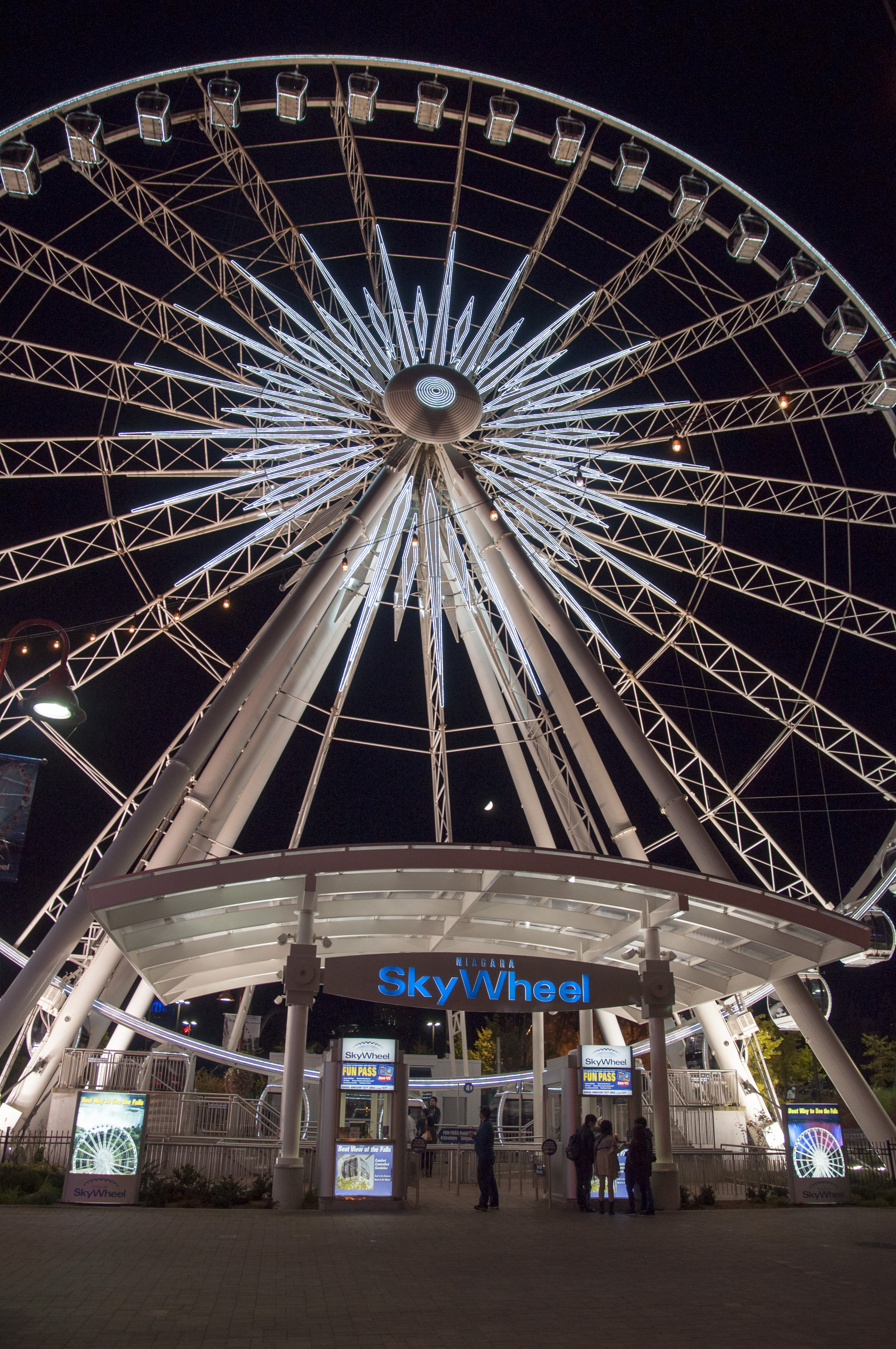
- Interactive map of the Niagara SkyWheel area

General information
- Type: Ferris wheel
- Location: Clifton Hill, Niagara Falls, Ontario, Canada
- Completed: 2006

Height
- Height: 53.3 metres (175 feet)

Dimensions
- Diameter: 50.5 metres (166.65 feet)

Design and construction
- Architect: Ronald Bussink Professional Rides
- Engineer: Chance Morgan

Niagara SkyWheel is a 175-foot (53.3 m) tall Ferris wheel in the middle of Clifton Hill, Niagara Falls, Ontario, Canada.

Niagara SkyWheel is a Ronald Bussink Professional Rides designed R60 Giant Wheel, manufactured by Chance Rides and supplied by Chance Morgan. It opened on 17 June 2006, at a cost of $10 million.

Its 42 Swiss-manufactured fully enclosed passenger cars can each carry 6-8 people with a total weight restriction of 1360 lbs. The gondolas are heated in the winter and air conditioned in the warmer months.

In 2013 the ride was briefly dismantled upon a gear cracking, resulting in a bolt popping out. The ride proceeded to unload the current passengers safely and effectively. Maintenance was performed by having replacement parts shipped from Switzerland and the Skywheel was reassembled and service resumed without further issues.

The ride is approximately 10 to 12 minutes long, giving passengers views of the Niagara River, and the Horseshoe Falls and American Falls, and is open all year, Operating hours vary depending on the time of year. Current hours can be found on the Clifton Hill website
