= Ronald Bussink =

Ferris wheel designer (born 1958)

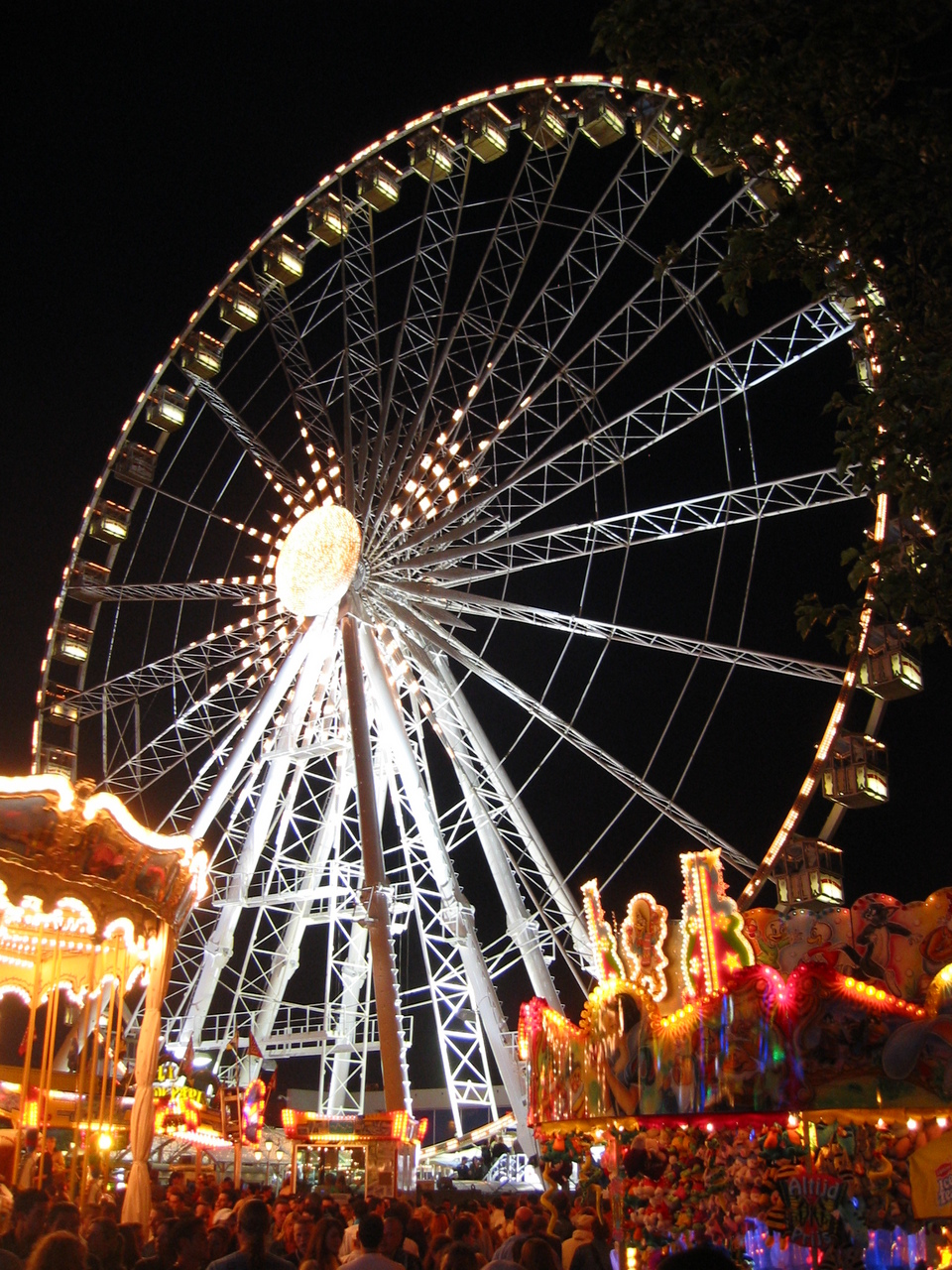
Roue de Paris, a Bussink R60 transportable wheel, pictured at Geleen in the Netherlands in 2005

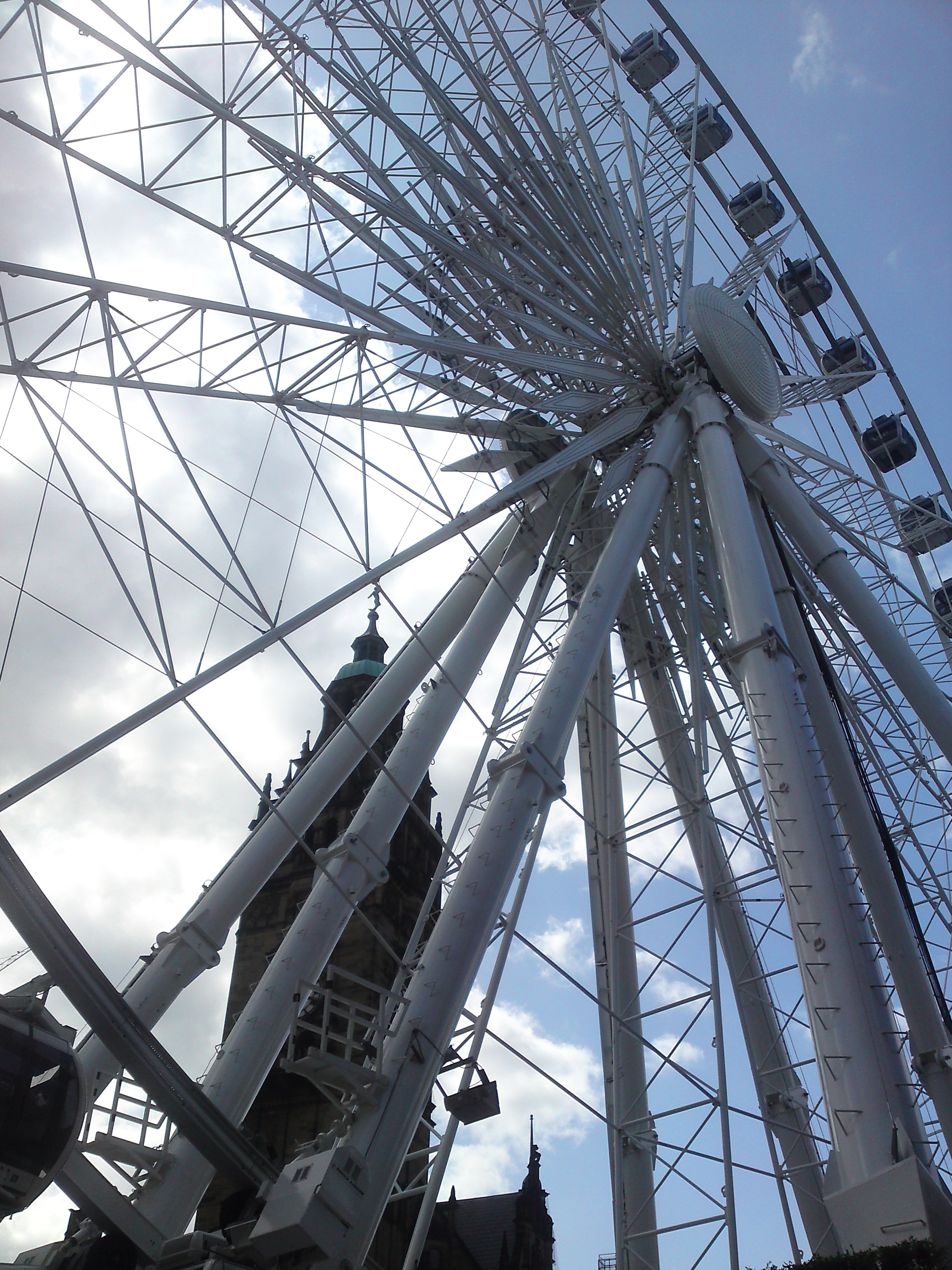
Wheel of Sheffield, a Bussink R60

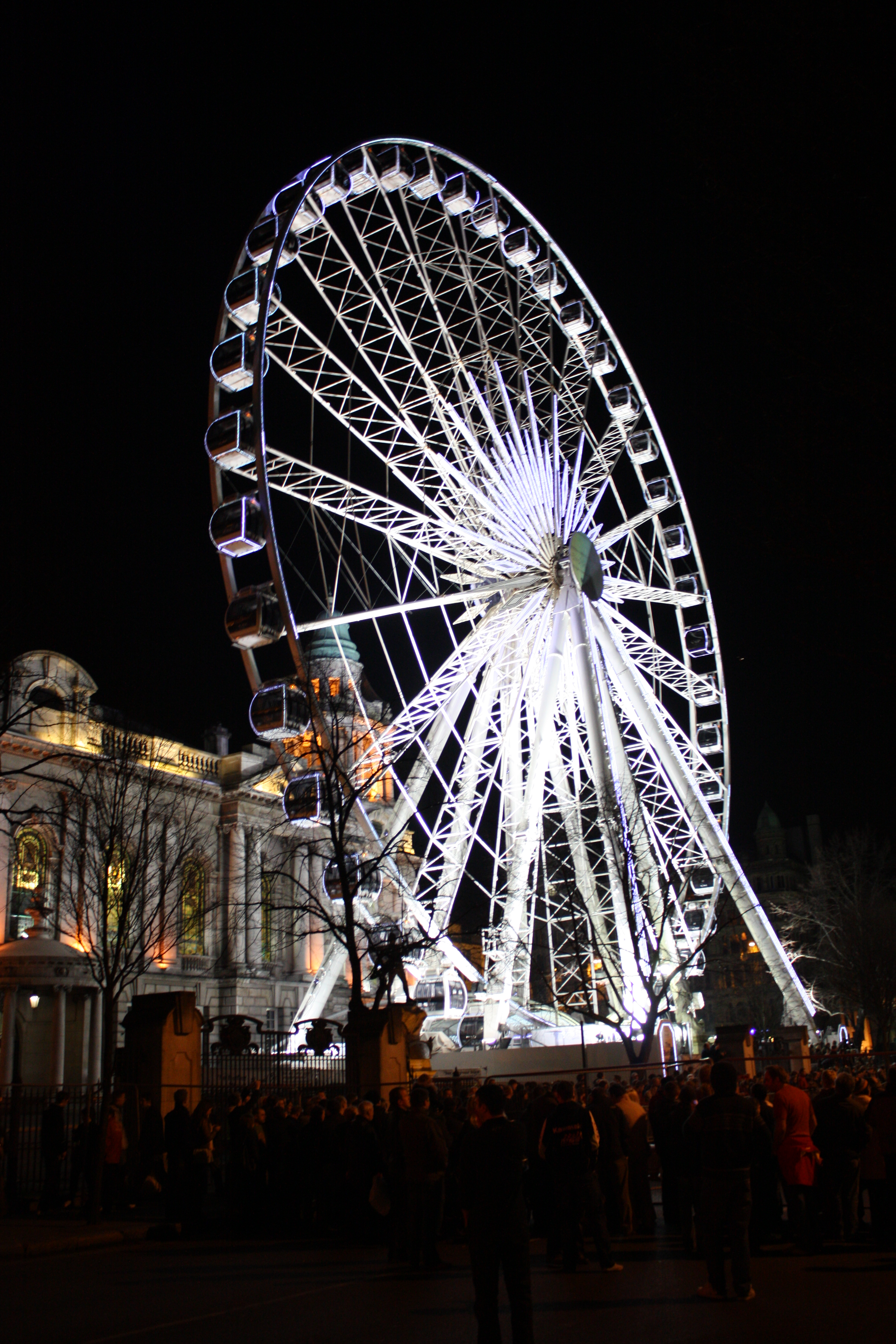
Belfast Wheel, a Bussink R60

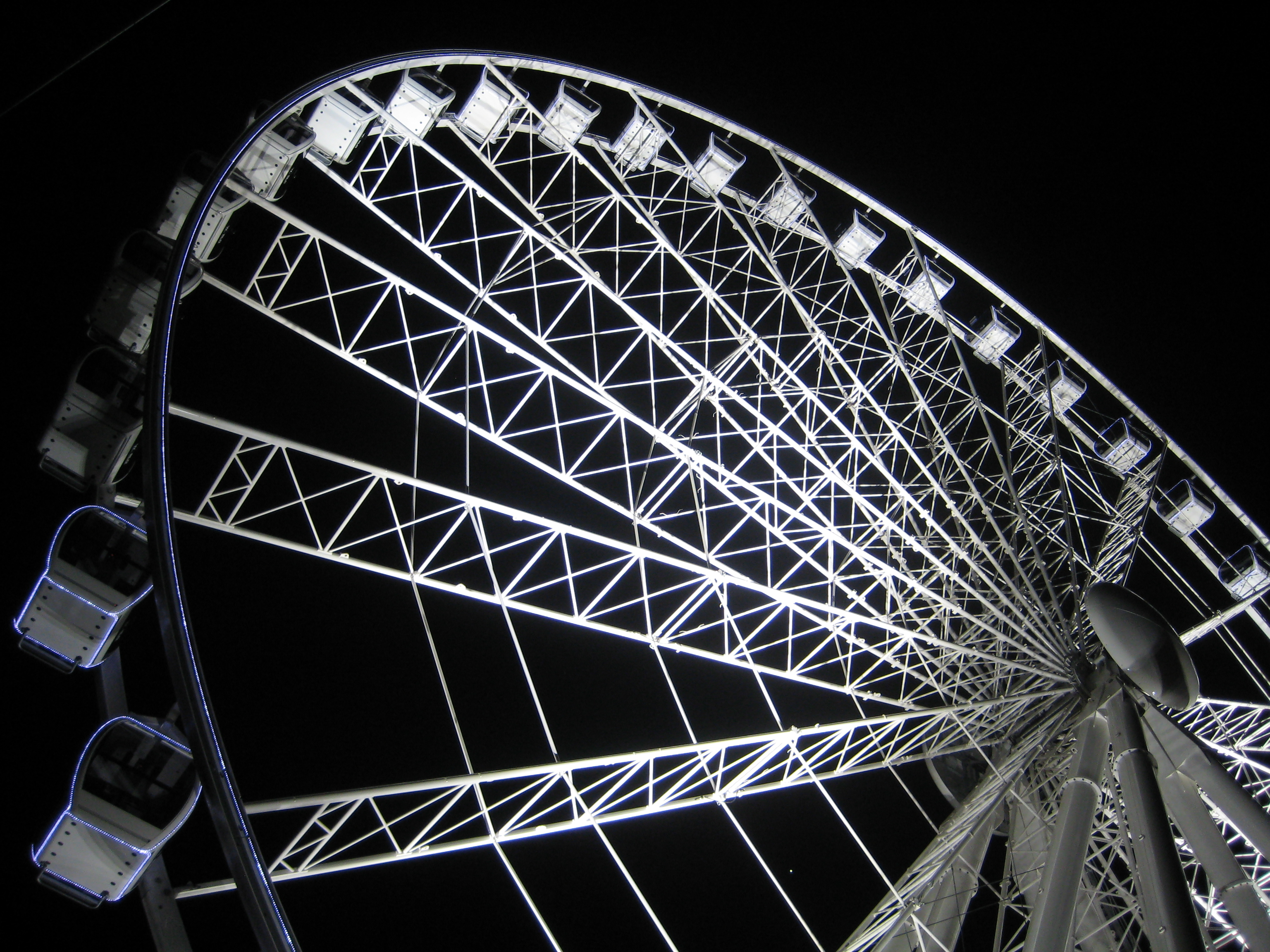
Wheel of Brisbane, a Bussink R60

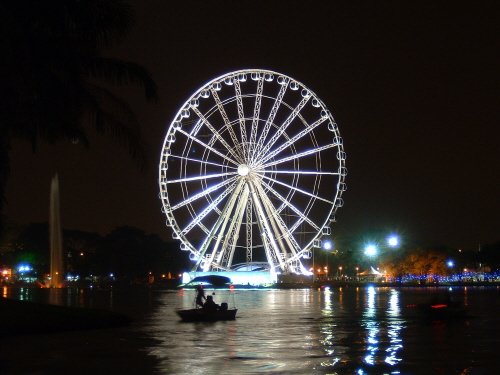
Eye on Malaysia, a Bussink R60

Ronald Alexander Bussink (born January 1958) is a Dutch engineer, and founder of his namesake company, which has been a leading designer of giant Ferris wheels and similar structures for over 25 years. Bussink entered the amusement industry market in 1985 and designed, manufactured, and delivered more than 60 giant observation wheels between 1990 and 2005.

The Bussink company was previously known as Nauta Bussink prior to moving its offices from the Netherlands to Appenzell Innerrhoden, Switzerland. It was then known as Ronald Bussink Professional Rides, a registered trademark of Ronald Bussink Aktiengesellschaft, which was subsequently renamed Professional Rides Aktiengesellschaft, RoBu Privat Equity AG and then RoBu AG.

In 2008, following the sale of Bussink's Wheels of Excellence range to Vekoma, Bussink created a new company, Bussink Landmarks, to concentrate on the supply of observation wheels of 100 metres (328 ft) and greater in height.

== Wheels of Excellence ==
The Wheels of Excellence range included the following models:

R40
Available as either a fixed or transportable model. 15 or 30 passenger cars, each able to carry 8 people.

R50
Available as either a fixed or transportable model. 18 or 36 passenger cars, each able to carry 8 people.

R60
Available as either a fixed or transportable model. 21 or 42 passenger cars, each able to carry 8 people.

Bussink R60 wheels have operated in Australia (Brisbane), Canada (Niagara Falls), France (Paris), Malaysia (Kuala Lumpur & Malacca), UK (Belfast, Birmingham, Manchester, Sheffield), US (Atlanta, Myrtle Beach) and elsewhere.

One of the most famous and well-travelled Bussink R60 wheels is the 60-metre (197 ft) tall Roue de Paris, originally installed on the Place de la Concorde in Paris for the 2000 millennium celebrations. Roue de Paris left France in 2002 and in 2003-2004 operated in Birmingham and Manchester, England. In 2005 it visited first Geleen then Amsterdam, Netherlands, before returning to England to operate at Gateshead. In 2006 it was erected at the Suan Lum Night Bazaar in Bangkok, Thailand, and by 2008 had made its way to Antwerp, Belgium. Roue de Paris uses 40,000 litres (8,800 imperial gallons) of water ballast to provide a stable base. It weighs 365 tonnes (402 short tons), and can be erected in 72 hours and dismantled in 60 hours by a specialist team. Transport requires seven 20-foot container lorries, ten open trailer lorries, and one closed trailer lorry. Its 42 passenger cars be loaded either 3 or 6 at a time, and each car can carry 8 people.

R80
Fixed wheel with either 6 or 8 support legs, and optional self-rotating capsules. 56 passenger cars, each able to carry 8 people.

In 2008, the Wheels of Excellence range of giant wheels was acquired by Vekoma Rides Manufacturing. Vekoma created a new division, Dutch Wheels BV, to market giant wheels as stand alone attractions. As of 2012, Wheels of Excellence variants listed by Dutch Wheels BV were the R40, R50, and R60 models.

== Bussink Landmarks ==
Following the sale of the Wheels of Excellence range, Bussink founded a new company, Bussink Landmarks, to concentrate on the supply of giant observation wheels of 100 metres (328 ft) and greater in height.

== Bussink Design ==
Bussink also founded, and is CEO of, Bussink Design. He designed the R80XL, which is manufactured and sold under licence from Bussink Design GmbH by Maurer German Wheels and Chance American Wheels. The R80XL is available in fixed (SV) and transportable (SP) versions, both approximately 78 metres (256 ft) tall. The R80XL SP is the world's tallest transportable observation wheel.

== See also ==
- Gold Reef City
- Top of the World (amusement ride)
