= Ferris Wheel of Paris =

Ferris Wheel of Paris may refer to:

- Grande Roue de Paris, the 100 metre Ferris wheel built for the Exposition Universelle world exhibition of 1900 and demolished in 1920
- Roue de Paris, the 60 metre transportable Ferris wheel erected on the Place de la Concorde for the year 2000 millennium celebrations
