= Monument =

Structure built to commemorate a relevant person or event

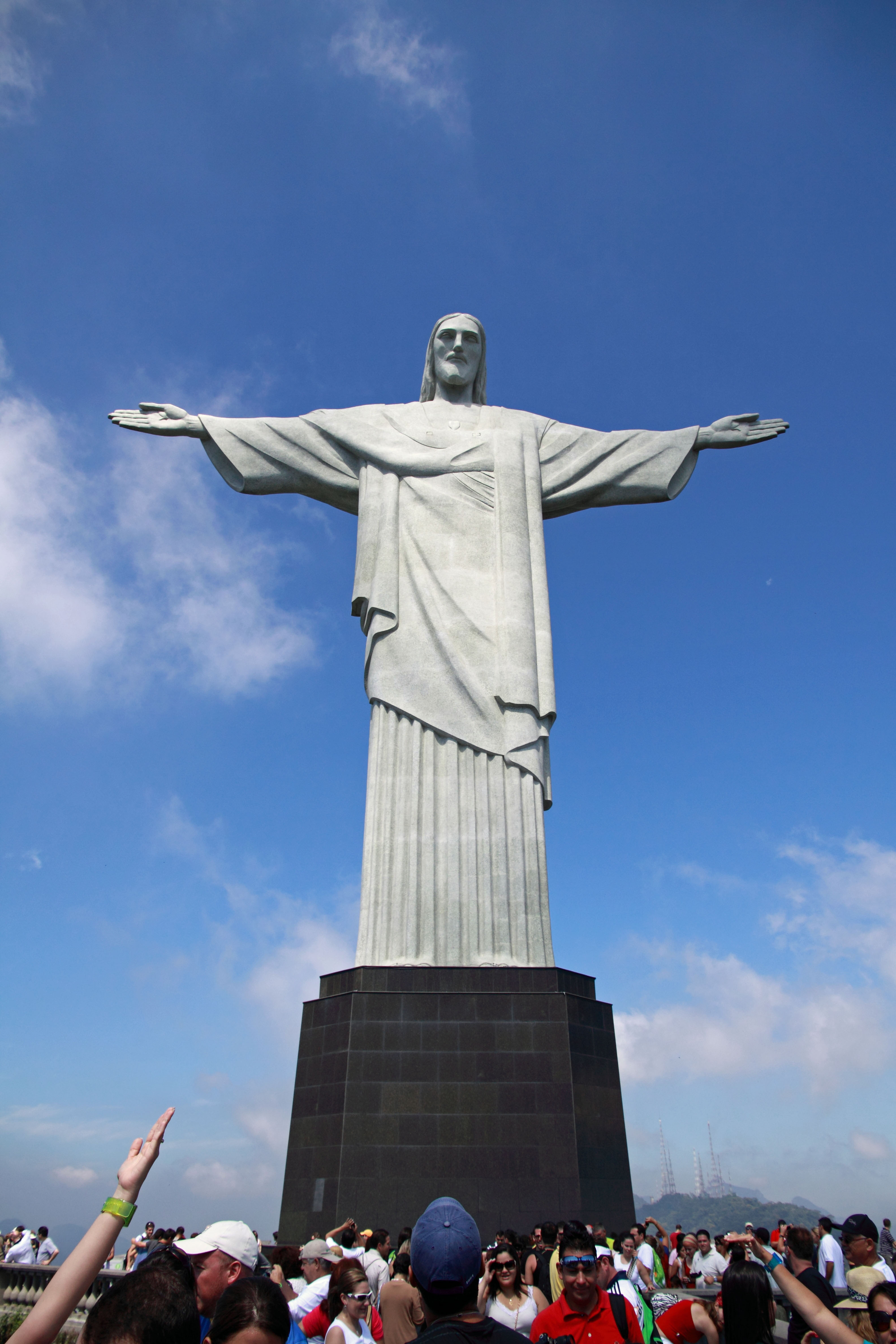
The Christ the Redeemer statue in Rio de Janeiro, Brazil, is the most visited monument in South America.

A monument is a type of structure created to commemorate a person or event, or which has become relevant to a social group as a part of their remembrance of historic times, or cultural heritage, due to its artistic, historical, political, technical or architectural importance. Examples of monuments include statues, (war) memorials, historical buildings, and cultural assets. If there is a public interest in its preservation, a monument can for example be listed as a UNESCO World Heritage Site.

== Etymology ==
The word "monument" comes from the Latin "monumentum", derived from the word moneo, monere, which means 'to remind' or 'to warn', suggesting a monument allows us to see the past thus helping us visualize what is to come in the future. In English the word "monumental" is often used in reference to something of extraordinary size and power, as in monumental sculpture, but also to mean simply anything made to commemorate the dead, as a funerary monument or other example of funerary art.

== Creation and functions ==
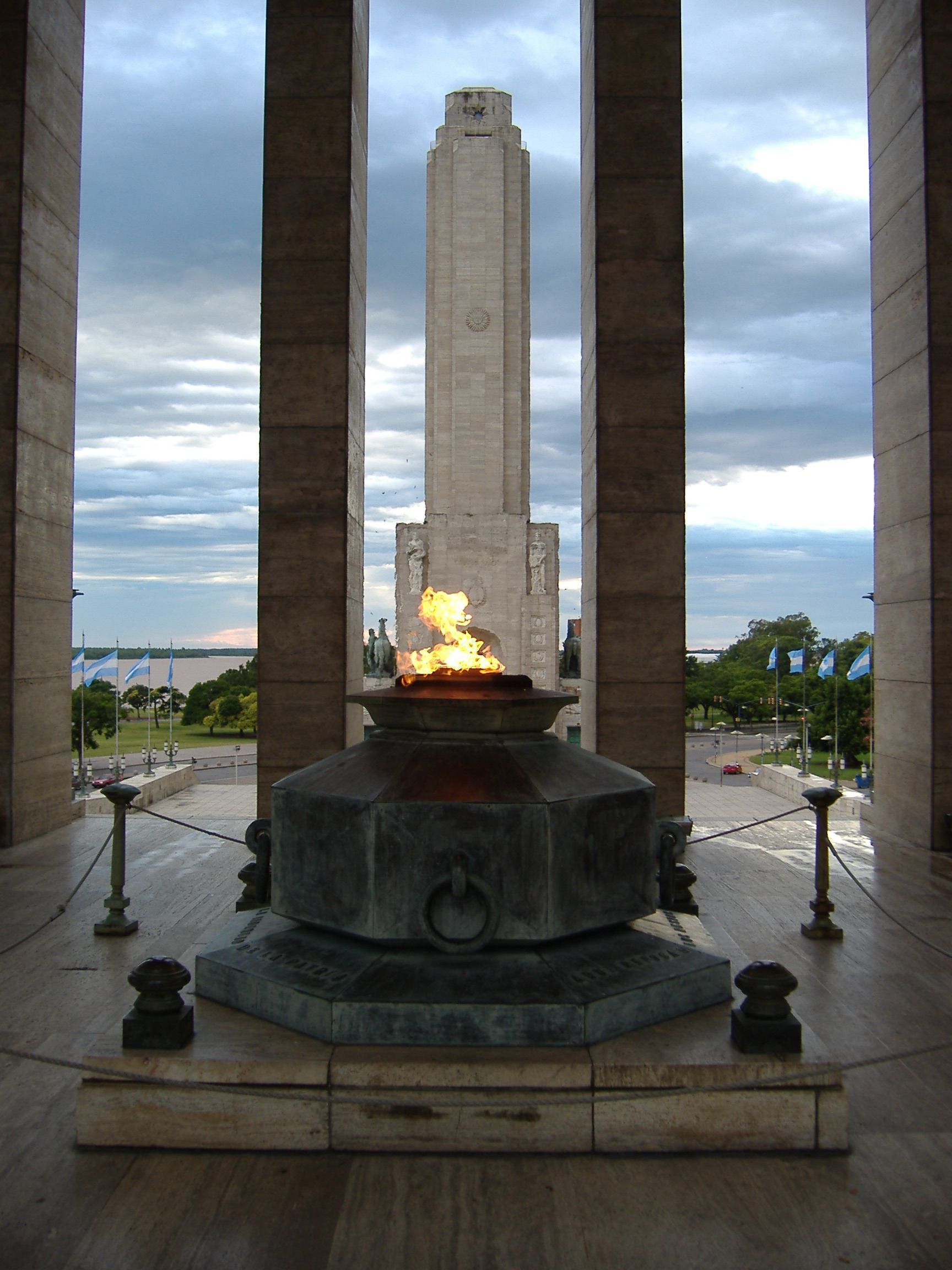
National Flag Memorial in Rosario, Argentina

A formalist interpretation of monuments suggests their origins date back to antiquity and even prehistory. Archaeologists like Gordon Childe viewed ancient monuments as symbols of power. Historians such as Lewis Mumford proposed that the practice began with Paleolithic landmarks, which served as sites for communication with ancestral spirits. However, these perspectives often project modern uses of monuments onto ancient structures. In art history, monuments are seen as significant sculptural forms; in architecture and urban planning, they are crucial for city organization and mapping. These contemporary interpretations have been retroactively applied to ancient and non-Western structures. This modern concept of monuments aligns with how past constructions are labeled as monuments today. Françóise Choay highlights the distinction between these views: "The historic monument is a precisely datable invention of the West... exported and diffused beyond Europe from the late nineteenth century."

Monuments are frequently used to improve the appearance of a city or location. Planned cities such as Washington, D.C., New Delhi and Brasília are often built around monuments. For example, the Washington Monument's location was conceived by L'Enfant to help organize public space in the city, before it was designed or constructed. Older cities have monuments placed at locations that are already important or are sometimes redesigned to focus on one.

Structures created for other purposes that have been made notable by their age, size or historic significance may also be regarded as monuments. This can happen because of great age and size, as in the case of the Great Wall of China, or because an event of great importance occurred there such as the village of Oradour-sur-Glane in France. Many countries use 'ancient monument' or similar terms for the official designation of protected structures or archaeological sites which may originally have been ordinary domestic houses or other buildings.

Monuments are also often designed to convey historical or political information, and they can thus develop an active socio-political potency. They can be used to reinforce the primacy of contemporary political power, such as the Trajan's Column in Rome or the numerous statues of Lenin in the Soviet Union. They can be used to educate the populace about important events or figures from the past, such as in the renaming of the old General Post Office Building in New York City to the James A. Farley Building, after James Farley, former Postmaster General of the United States. To fulfill its informative and educative functions a monument needs to be open to the public, which means that its spatial dimension, as well as its content can be experienced by the public, and be sustainable. The former may be achieved either by situating the monument in public space or by a public discussion about the monument and its meaning, the latter by the materiality of the monument or if its content immediately becomes part of the collective or cultural memory.

The social meanings of monuments are rarely fixed and certain and are frequently contested by different social groups. As an example, the many Confederate monuments that dot the landscape of the American South stand for the remembrance of slavery and continued systemic racism, for one group, and as a token of honor to the ancestors of another group.

== Loss and destruction ==
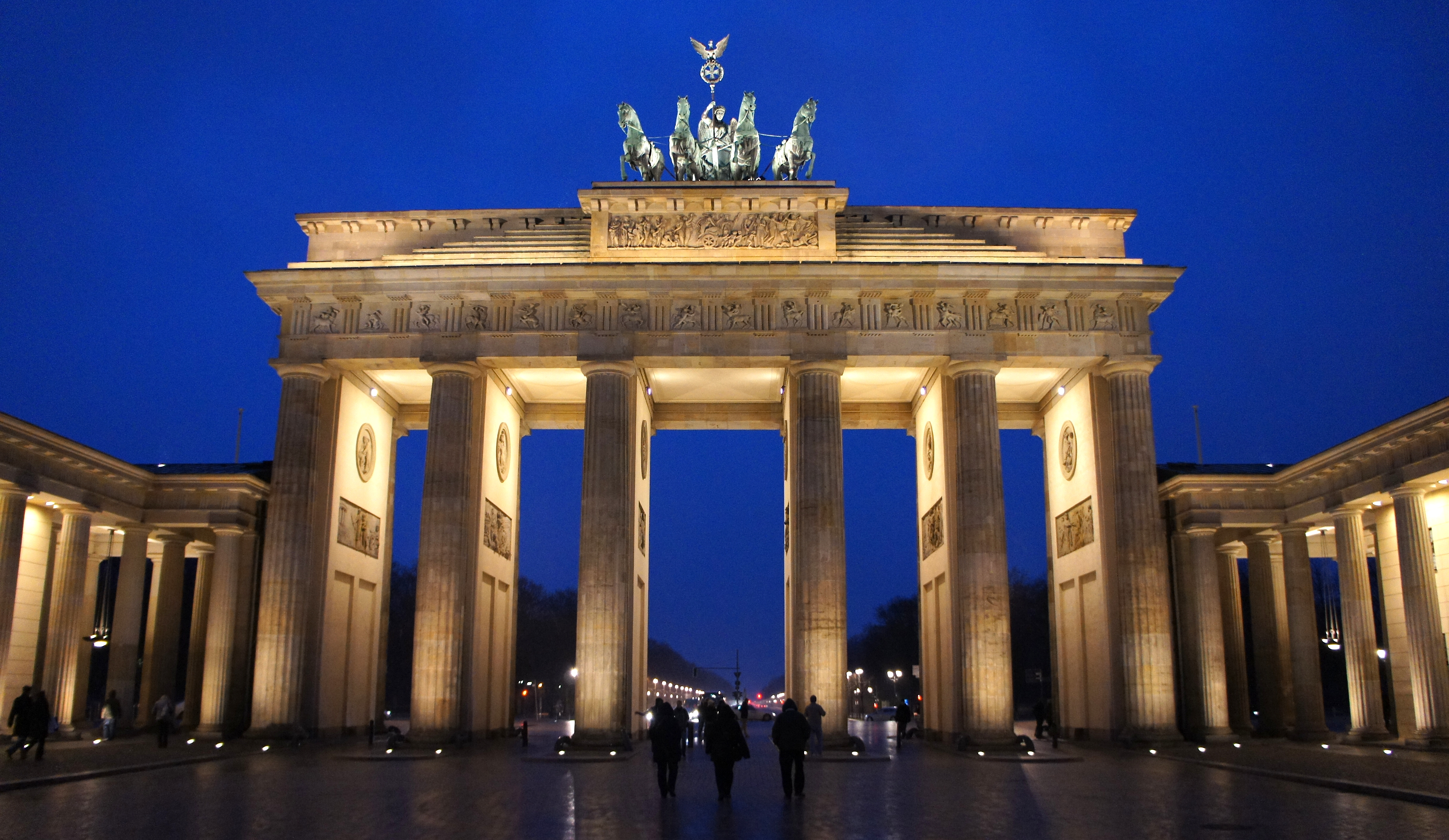
Brandenburg Gate in Berlin, nationalist symbol of Germany and its unity

While many ancient monuments still exist today, there are notable incidents of monuments being intentionally or accidentally destroyed and many monuments are likely to have disappeared through the passage of time and natural forces such as erosion. In 772 during the Saxon Wars, Charlemagne intentionally destroyed an Irminsul monument in order to desecrate the pagan religion. In 1687 the Parthenon in Athens was partially destroyed by a Venetian mortar round, which set off the store of gunpowder kept there by the Turkish defenders.

A recent archaeological dig in central France uncovered the remains of a Megalithic monument that had been previously destroyed: "Like some monuments, including Belz in Morbihan, the menhirs of Veyre-Monton were knocked down in order to make them disappear from the landscape. Pushed into large pits, sometimes mutilated or covered with earth, these monoliths have been destroyed. 'object of iconoclastic gestures, a sort of condemnation perhaps linked to some change of community or beliefs "

== Protection and preservation ==
The term is often used to describe any structure that is a significant and legally protected historic work, and many countries have equivalents of what is called in United Kingdom legislation a Scheduled Monument, which often include relatively recent buildings constructed for residential or industrial purposes, with no thought at the time that they would come to be regarded as "monuments".

Until recently, it was customary for archaeologists to study large monuments and pay less attention to the everyday lives of the societies that created them. New ideas about what constitutes the archaeological record have revealed that certain legislative and theoretical approaches to the subject are too focused on earlier definitions of monuments. An example has been the United Kingdom's Scheduled Ancient Monument laws.

Other than municipal or national government that protecting the monuments in their jurisdiction, there are institutions dedicated on the efforts to protect and preserve monuments that considered to possess special natural or cultural significance for the world, such as UNESCO's World Heritage Site programme and World Monuments Fund.

Cultural monuments are also considered to be the memory of a community and are therefore particularly at risk in the context of modern asymmetrical warfare. The enemy's cultural heritage is to be sustainably damaged or even destroyed. In addition to the national protection of cultural monuments, international organizations (cf. UNESCO World Heritage, Blue Shield International) therefore try to protect cultural monuments.

== Types ==
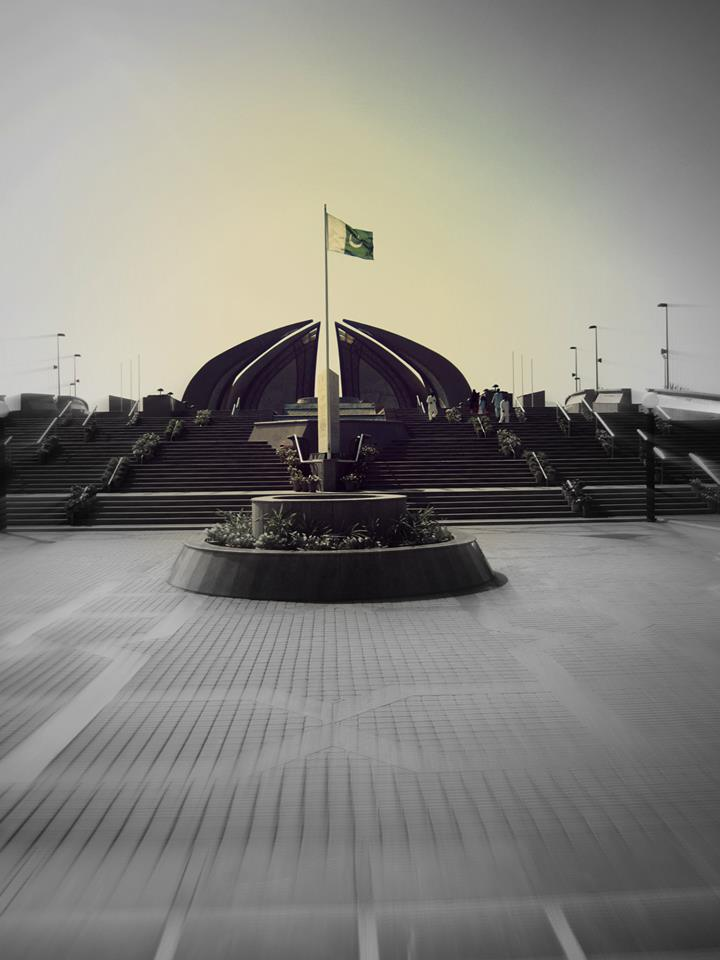
Pakistan Monument

- Benchmarks placed by a government agency or private survey firm.
- Buildings designed as landmarks, usually built with an extraordinary feature, such being designed as the tallest, largest, or most distinctive design, e.g., the Burj Khalifa in Dubai, the world's tallest structure or the One World Trade Center, the tallest building in the United States, built to memorialize the attack on September 11.
- Cenotaphs (intended to honour the dead who are buried elsewhere) and other memorials to commemorate the dead, usually war casualties, e.g., India Gate and Vimy Ridge Memorial, or disaster casualties, such as the Titanic Memorial, Belfast.
- Church monuments to commemorate the faithful dead, located above or near their grave, often featuring an effigy, e.g., St. Peter's Basilica or the medieval church Sta Maria di Collemaggio in L'Aquila.
- Columns, often topped with a statue, e.g., Berlin Victory Column, Nelson's Column in London, and Trajan's Column in Rome.
- Eternal flames that are kept burning continuously, usually lit to honor unknown soldiers, e.g., at the Tomb of Unknown Soldier in Moscow or at the John F. Kennedy gravesite in Virginia's Arlington National Cemetery.
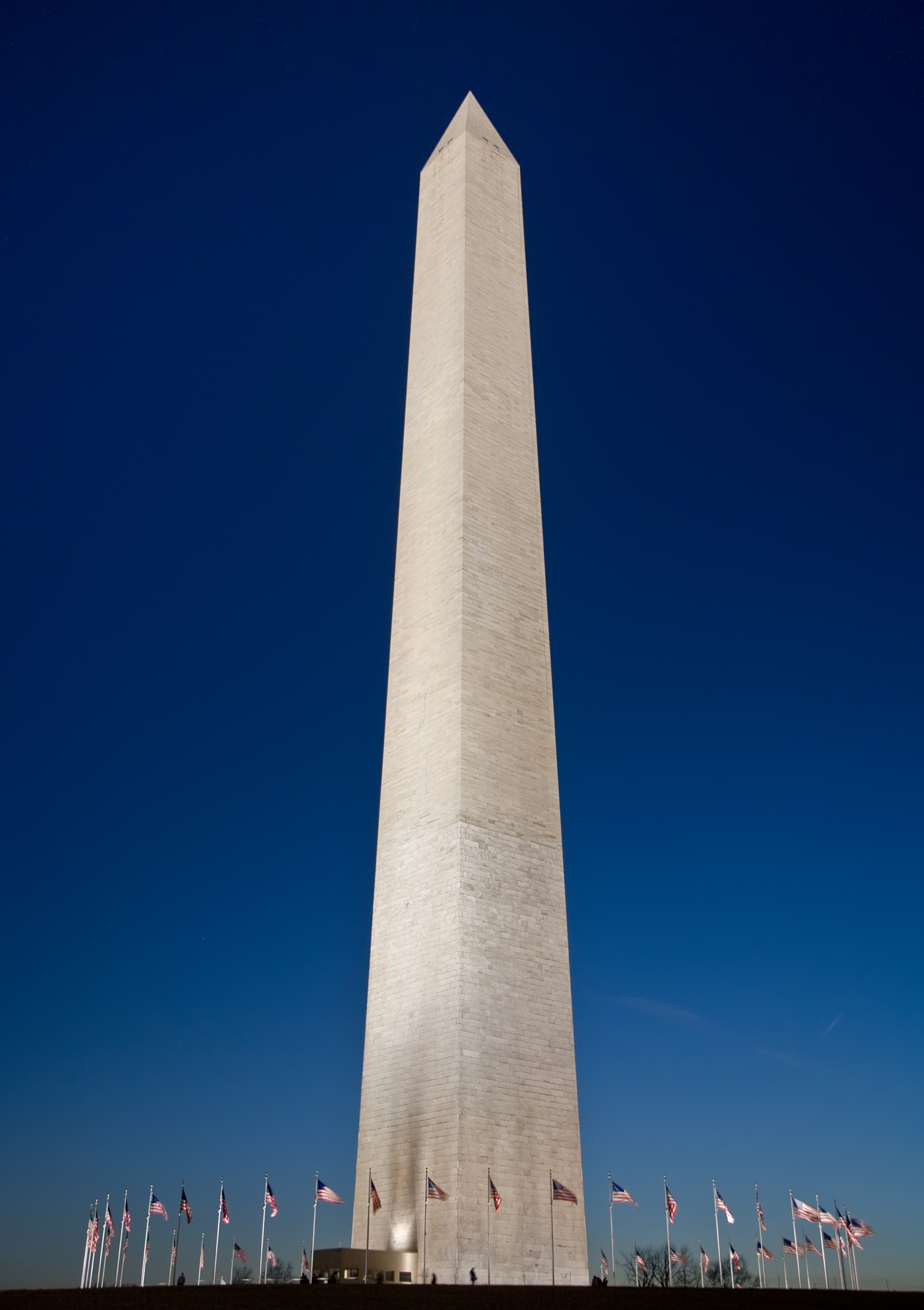
  The Washington Monument in Washington, D.C., which honors the first president of the United States, George Washington, is the world's tallest obelisk.
- Fountains, water-pouring structures usually placed in formal gardens or town squares, e.g., Fontaines de la Concorde and Gardens of Versailles.
- Gravestones, small monuments to the deceased, placed at their gravesites, e.g., the tombs and vaults of veterans in Les Invalides and Srebrenica Genocide Memorial.
- Mausoleums and tombs to honor the dead, e.g., the Great Pyramid of Giza, Libyco-Punic Mausoleum of Dougga and Taj Mahal.
- Monoliths erected for religious or commemorative purposes, e.g., Stonehenge.
- Mosque Monuments, places of worship that generally have domes and minarets that stand out against the skyline. They also usually feature highly skilled Islamic calligraphy and geometric artwork, e.g., the Mosque of the Prophet, the Umayyad Mosque in Damascus, Dome of the Rock in Jerusalem, Great Mosque of Samarra in Iraq.
- Mounds erected to commemorate great leaders or events, e.g., Kościuszko Mound.
- Obelisks, usually erected to commemorate great leaders, e.g., Cleopatra's Needle in London, the National Monument ("Monas") in Central Jakarta, and the Washington Monument in Washington, D.C.
- Palaces, imposing royal residences designed to impress people with their grandeur and greatness, e.g., Forbidden City in Beijing, Palace of Versailles, and Schwerin Palace in Schwerin.
- Searchlights to project a powerful beam of light, e.g., Tribute in Light in the National September 11 Memorial & Museum in New York City, commemorating the September 11 attacks of 2001.
- Statues of famous individuals or symbols, e.g., the Niederwalddenkmal (Germania) in Hesse, Liberty Enlightening the World (commonly known as the Statue of Liberty) in New York City, and The Motherland Calls in Volgograd.
- Temples or religious structures built for pilgrimage, ritual or commemorative purposes, e.g., Borobudur in Magelang and Kaaba in Mecca.
- Terminating Vistas, layout design for urban monuments on the end of an avenue, e.g., Opera Garnier in Paris.
- Triumphal arches, almost always to commemorate military successes, e.g., the Arch of Constantine in Rome and Arc de Triomphe de l'Étoile in Paris.
- War memorials, e.g., the Iwo Jima Memorial in Arlington, VA, the Laboe Naval Memorial, the Lorraine American Cemetery and Memorial in St Avold, and the Soviet War Memorial in Berlin.

== See also ==
- Antiquities Act
- English Heritage Archive, holds data on England's monuments
- Monumental sculpture
- National memorial
- National monument
