= Titanic Memorial, Belfast =

Public sculpture by Thomas Brock

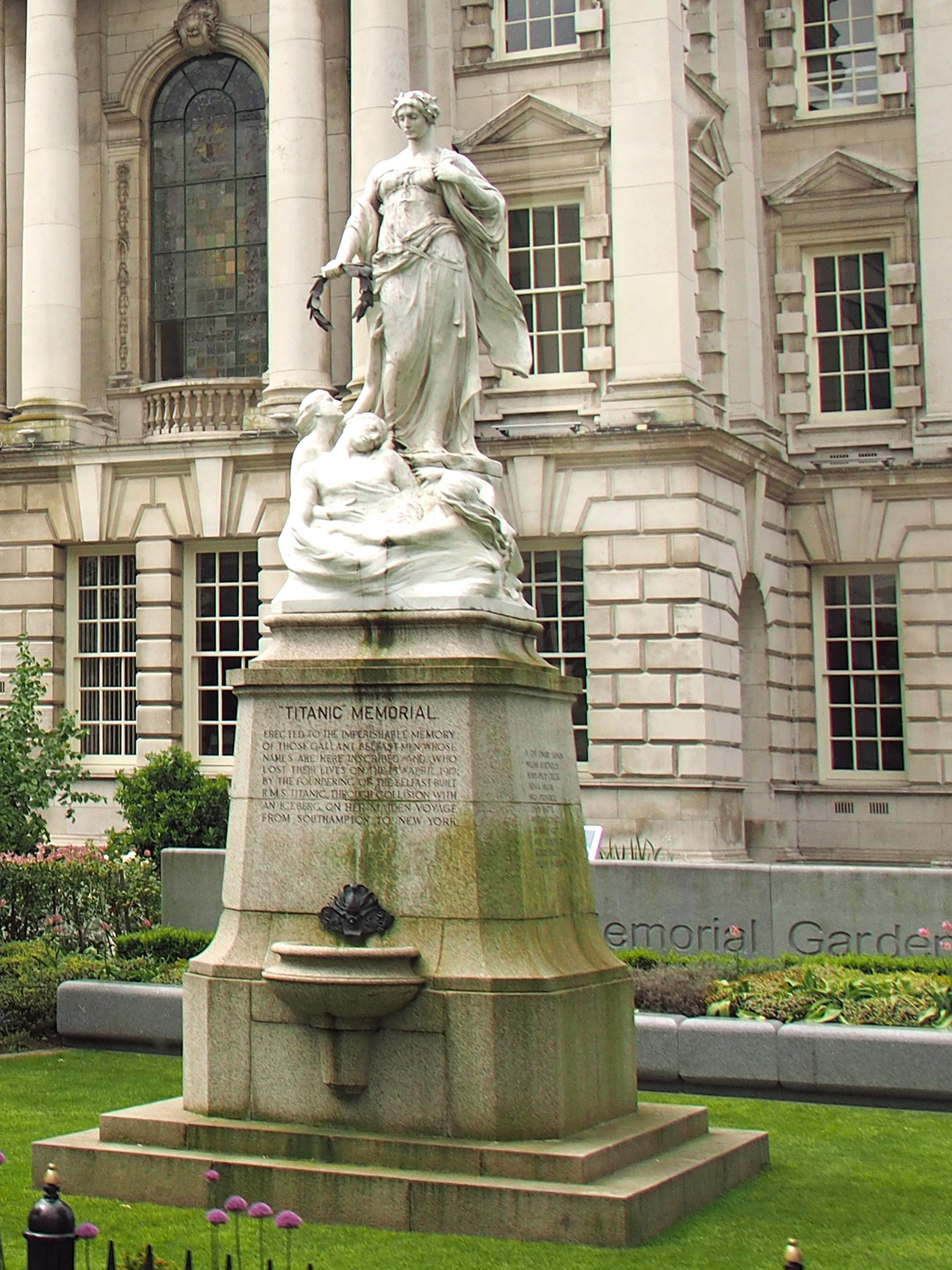
The Titanic Memorial in Belfast

The Titanic Memorial in Belfast was erected to commemorate the lives lost in the sinking of the RMS Titanic on 15 April 1912. It was funded by contributions from the public, shipyard workers, and victims' families, and was dedicated in June 1920. It sits on Donegall Square in central Belfast, Northern Ireland in the grounds of Belfast City Hall.

The memorial presents an allegorical representation of the disaster in the form of a female personification of Death, or Fate, holding a laurel wreath over the head of a drowned sailor raised above the waves by a pair of mermaids. It has been used as the site of annual commemorations of the Titanic disaster. For a while it was obscured by the Belfast Wheel that was removed in April 2010. It is now the centrepiece of a small Titanic memorial garden opened on 15 April 2012, the centenary of the disaster. Together with the garden, it is the only memorial in the world to commemorate all of the victims of the Titanic, passengers and crew alike.

== Fund-raising, commissioning and dedication ==
Within days of the Titanic disaster, suggestions were put forward in Belfast that the local victims should be commemorated with a memorial. Belfast City Council passed a resolution on 1 May 1912 stating that "the City of Belfast recognises with unbounded pride that in the hour of trial the fortitude of her sons failed not; and while she mourns for her dead, she rejoices in having given to the world men who could so nobly die." A proposal was formally put forward on 3 May 1912 in a meeting at Belfast City Hall chaired by Julia McMordie, the wife of Lord Mayor of Belfast R. J. McMordie, both of whom had attended the launching of Titanic the previous June. It passed a resolution authorising the building of

an appropriate public Memorial, to be erected on the most prominent site available, so that it may keep green the memory [of those lost] and serve to tell succeeding generations of their heroism and devotion to duty; also that the question as to its particular character be referred to a sub-committee for consideration and report.

By the end of May 1912, the sum of £1,035.0s.4d had been raised. About a third of the money came from members of the public. Of the rest, employees of Harland and Wolff – who had built Titanic – provided £231.5s.11d, the family of Titanic's designer Thomas Andrews – who was lost in the disaster – contributed £360, and the White Star Line, Titanic's owners, gave £105. On 30 July 1912, McMordie asked the council's Improvement Committee to provide a site in Donegall Square North or Castle Junction. The city surveyor reported on 6 August that the Donegall Square site was suitable and the memorial committee turned its attention to choosing a sculptor. Sir Thomas Brock RA, a distinguished English sculptor who had already contributed statues of Queen Victoria and Sir Edward Harland to Belfast and the Victoria Memorial in London, was commissioned to produce the Titanic Memorial. He began work following a final vote of confirmation by the City Council on 2 January 1913.

The outbreak of the First World War in August 1914 caused a long delay in completing and erecting the memorial. On 26 June 1920, a hot sunny Saturday, the dedication ceremony was held. It was unveiled by Field Marshal Viscount French, the last Lord Lieutenant of Ireland.

== Description of the memorial ==
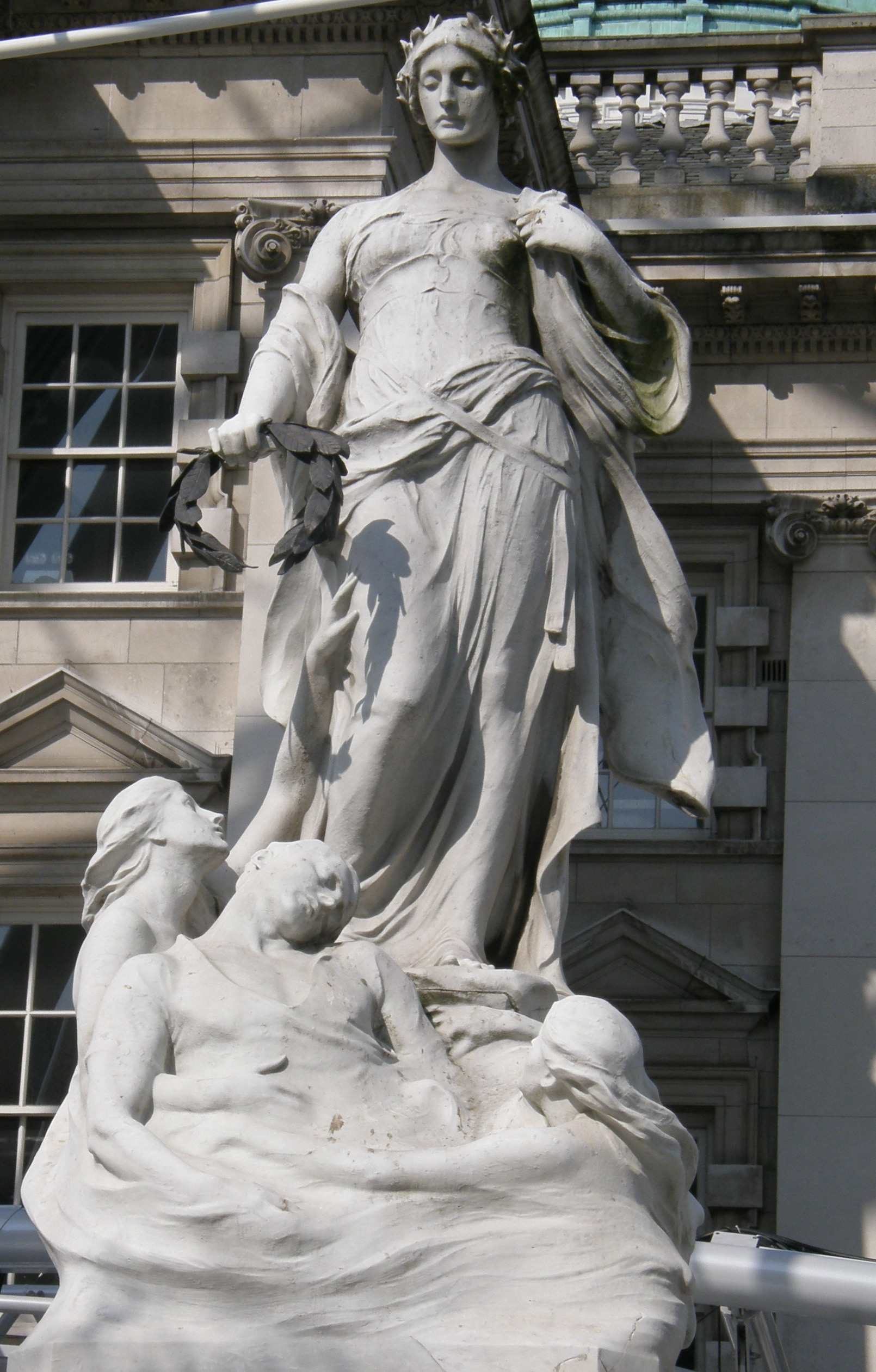
Close-up view of the figures on the memorial

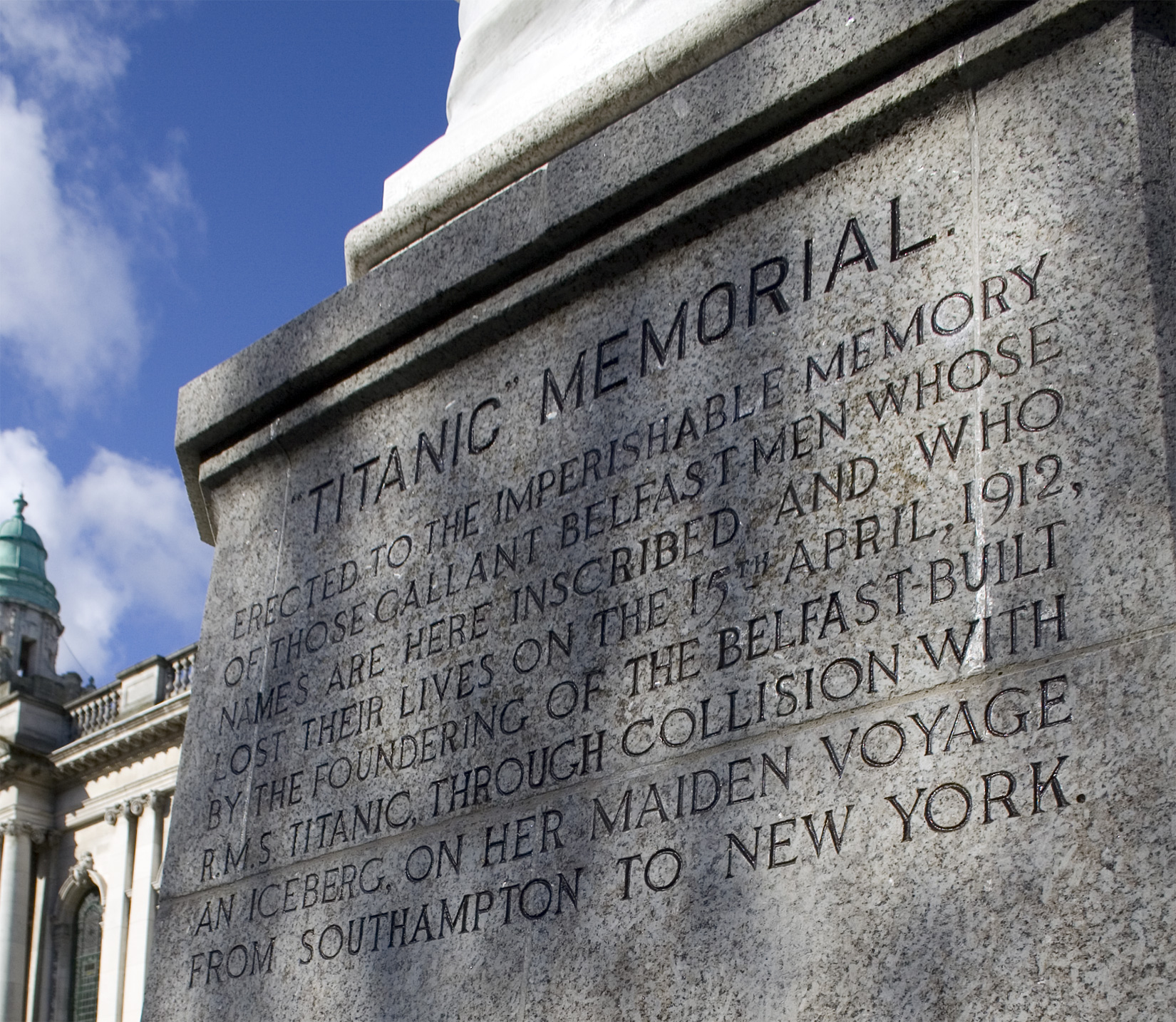
Front inscription on the plinth

The memorial consists of a group of four figures set on a plinth, standing a total of 22 feet (6.7 m) high. The figures are carved from Carrara marble and stand 12 feet (3.7 m) high. At the centre of the design is a standing female figure, thought variously to symbolise either Fame or a female version of Thanatos, the ancient Greek personification of death. She holds a black laurel wreath in her outstretched hand above the heads of the three figures below. They comprise two mermaids at her feet bearing a dead seaman above the waves, which emerge from the top of the plinth.

The plinth's front and back faces feature two small bronze water-fountains in the shape of the heads of gargoyle-like creatures with recessed eyes, stumpy noses and webbed antlers. The plinth's front face bears the following inscription, focusing exclusively on the heroism of the local victims:

Erected to the imperishable memory of those gallant Belfastmen whose names are here inscribed and who lost their lives on the 15th April 1912, by the foundering of the Belfast-built R.M.S. Titanic, through collision with an iceberg, on her maiden voyage from Southampton to New York.

Their devotion to duty and heroic conduct, through which the lives of many of those on board were saved, have left a record of calm fortitude and self-sacrifice which will ever remain an inspiring example to succeeding generations.

'Greater love hath no man than this, that a man lay down his life for his friends.'

On the sides of the plinth are inscribed the names of 22 men from Belfast who died in the disaster. They are listed in order of shipboard rank rather than alphabetical order, as was the practice at the time; thus Thomas Andrews, as a managing director of Harland and Wolff, is listed first, while the lowest-ranking crew members occupy the tail end of the list. Nine of the Belfast victims were members of a Harland and Wolff "guarantee party" aboard Titanic to identify and fix problems spotted during her maiden voyage, while the rest were crew members mostly employed in engineering roles. The Harland and Wolff staff and crew members are listed separately on two faces of the plinth. The names are:

- Thomas Andrews – Managing Director, H&W
- William H.M. Parr – Assistant Manager Electrical Department, H&W
- Roderick Chisholm – Chief Draughtsman, H&W
- Anthony Wood Frost – Foreman Fitter, H&W
- Robert Knight – Leading Hand Fitter, H&W
- William Campbell – Apprentice Joiner, H&W
- Ennis H. Watson – Apprentice Electrician, H&W
- Francis Parkes – Apprentice Plumber, H&W
- Alfred F. Cunningham – Apprentice Fitter, H&W
- Herbert G. Harvey – Junior Assistant Engineer, Crew
- Albert G. Ervine – Assistant Electrician, Crew
- John E. Simpson – Assistant Ship's Surgeon, Crew
- William McReynolds – Junior Sixth Engineer, Crew
- Henry P. Creese – Deck Engineer, Crew
- Thomas Millar – Assistant Deck Engineer, Crew
- Hugh Fitzpatrick – Assistant Boilermaker, Crew
- Joseph Beattie – Greaser, Crew
- Matthew Leonard – Steward, Crew
- Archibald Scott – Fireman, Crew
- Hugh Calderwood – Trimmer, Crew
- Richard Turley – Fireman, Crew
- William McQuillan – Fireman, Crew

It was thought at the time that 22 people from Northern Ireland had died in the disaster and only the names of those victims are recorded on the memorial. Subsequent research has established that in fact 28 victims of the disaster were from Northern Ireland, out of 36 people with Ulster connections aboard the ship. The remaining six victims were all men and comprised four crew members, one Second Class passenger and one Third Class passenger. Their names are not listed on the memorial.

== Move, restoration, and creation of Memorial Garden ==
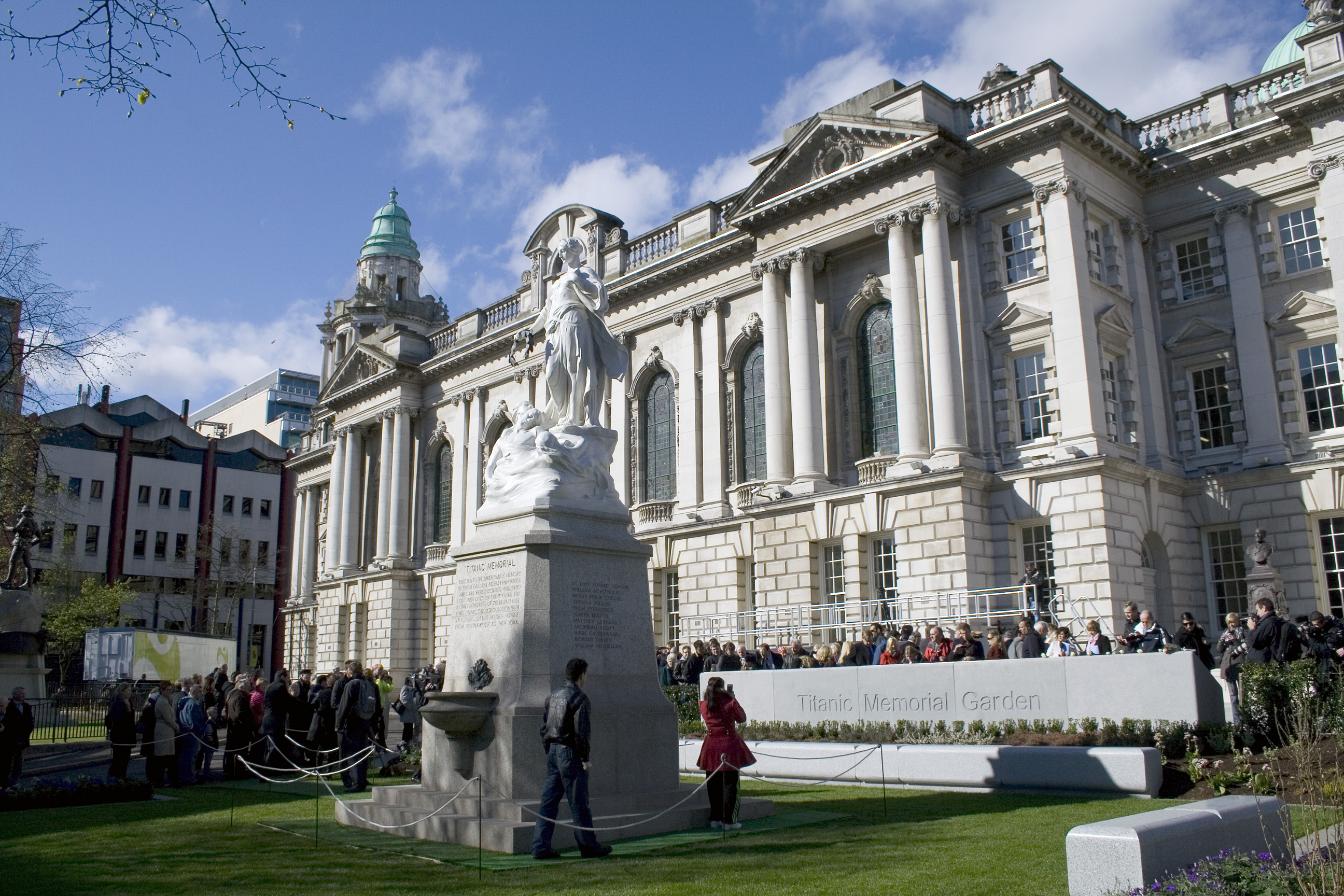
The opening of the Titanic Memorial Garden on 15 April 2012

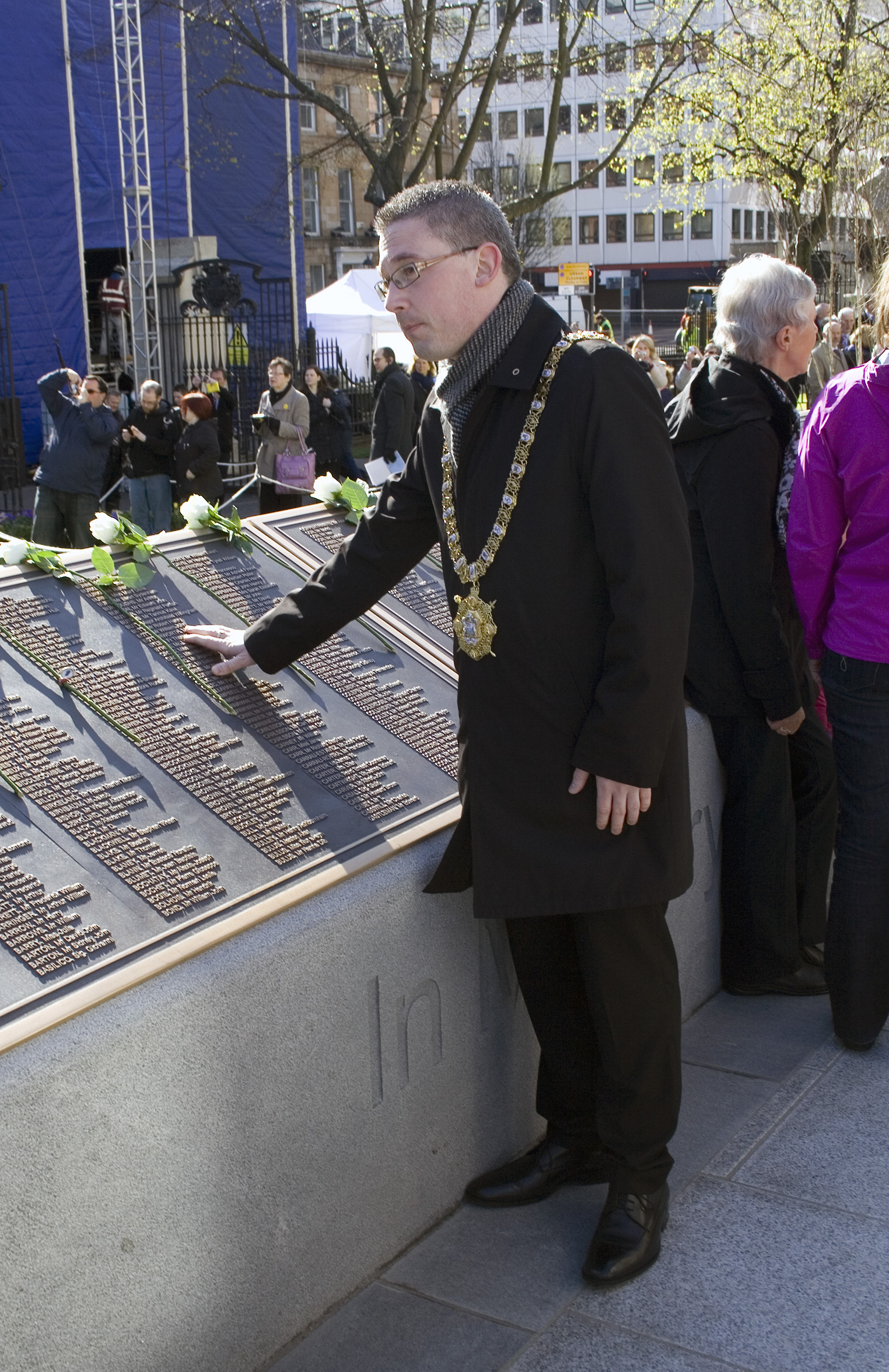
Lord Mayor of Belfast Niall Ó Donnghaile at the opening of the Memorial Garden

The memorial was originally located in the middle of the road on Donegall Square North. However, this caused multiple accidents, as drivers travelling around the square often did not see it or could not change lanes in time and collided with it. In 1959 Belfast City Council decided to move it and requested suggestions for an alternative location. Various sites around the city were suggested and a bid was even made by the County Down fishing of Portavogie, whose inhabitants suggested that their community would benefit from tourist traffic generated by moving the memorial to their village. In the end, though, it was decided to move the memorial only a few hundred yards, to a new site in the grounds of the City Hall at Donegall Square East. The move took place on 28 November 1959 and cost £1,200.

In 1994 the Consarc Design Group was commissioned to restore and repair the memorial. The bronze water-fountains had disappeared during the 1959 move, so replacements were made to restore the memorial to its original appearance. The memorial was renovated again in 2011–2 to clean the statue and to recarve and repaint the lettering so that it would be more legible. An annual service of commemoration for the Northern Irish victims of the Titanic's sinking is still held each on 15 April each year at the memorial.

The memorial became the focus of controversy when the Belfast Wheel was constructed around and on top of it in November 2007. The Belfast Titanic Society objected to the wheel's location and proposed that the memorial be moved to the north eastern corner of the City Hall grounds. The wheel was eventually closed and removed in April 2010.

After the wheel's removal it was proposed that, to mark the centenary of the sinking of the Titanic, a memorial garden should be established around the sculpture. The idea was widely supported. The garden was opened in a ceremony held on 15 April 2012, with wreaths laid by Lord Mayor of Belfast Niall Ó Donnghaile, Jack Martin, great nephew of Titanic victim John Simpson, and David McVeigh on behalf of Titanic″s builders Harland and Wolff.

The memorial garden is set on two levels around and above the existing Titanic Memorial. Its upper level includes five bronze plaques on a plinth 9 metres (30 ft) wide, naming all 1,512 victims of the disaster, passengers and crew, listed in alphabetical order. It is the first memorial anywhere in the world to record all of the names of the victims on one monument. The main area of the garden is planted with springtime flowers such as magnolias, roses, forget-me-nots and rosemary, the colours being intended to evoke those of water and ice. Two of those who died in the disaster are thought to have travelled under false names, and are recorded with an asterisk next to their pseudonyms as their real names are still unknown.

== See also ==
- List of public art in Belfast
