= Wheel of Birmingham =

Ferris wheels in Birmingham, England

Coordinates: 52°28′44.04″N 1°54′32.49″W

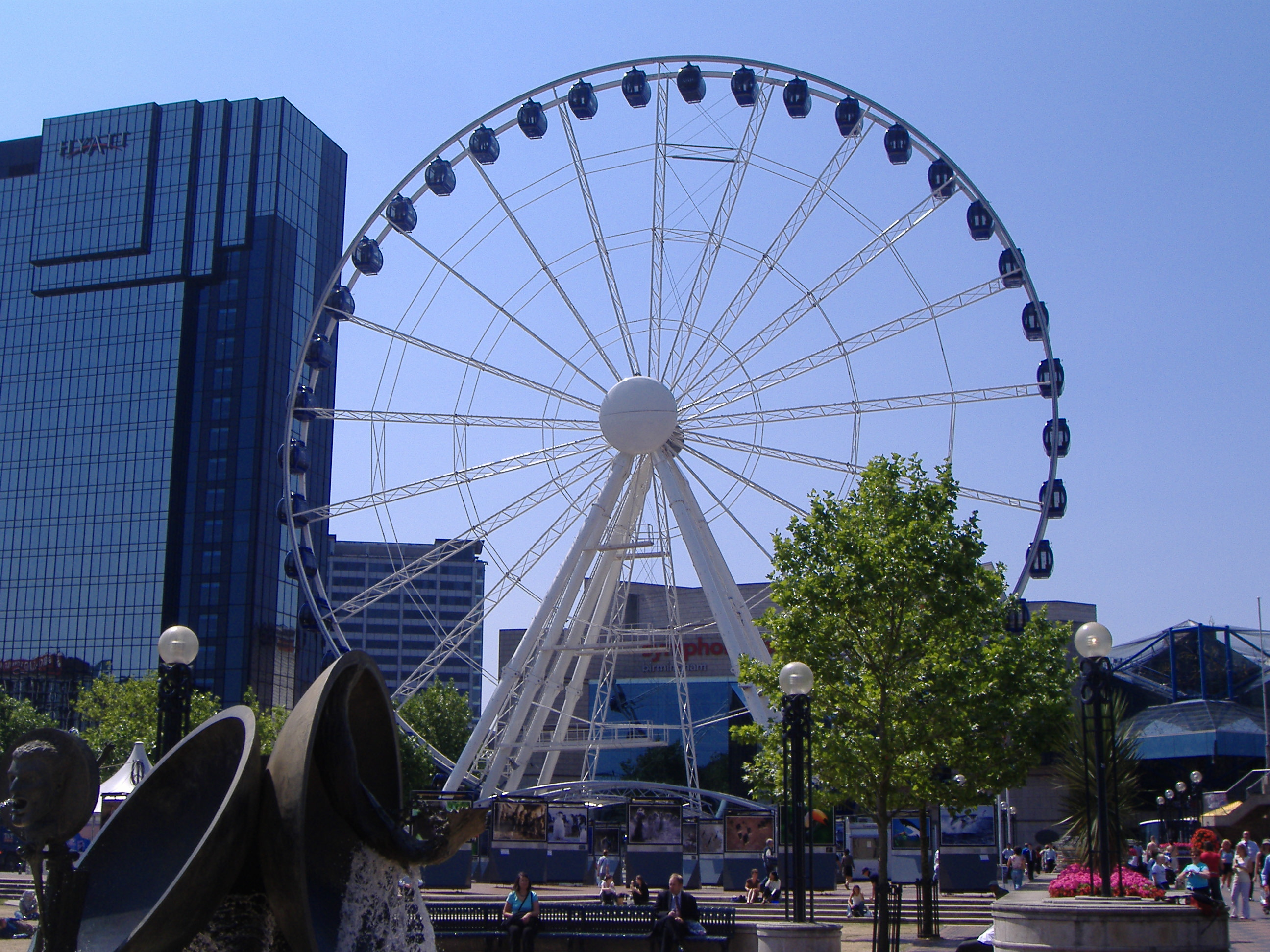
The second Birmingham Wheel

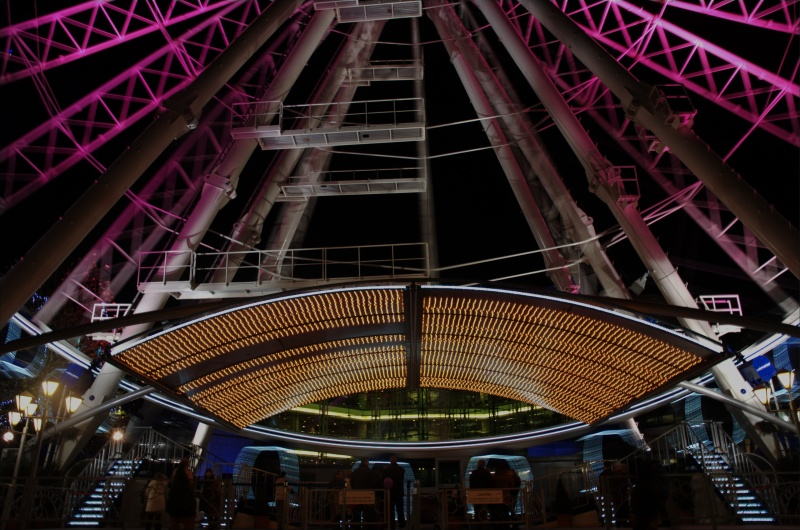
The entrance to the wheel, in 2005

The Wheel of Birmingham or Birmingham Wheel was a series of transportable Ferris wheel installations at Centenary Square in Birmingham, England. These have been landmarks in central Birmingham, visible from many parts of the city. The first opened on 6 November 2003, and its replacement opened on 21 October 2004, both being 60 metres (197 ft) tall.

A third wheel, the Birmingham Mail Wheel, operated from 18 January 2010 until 22 February 2010, and was also 60 m tall.

== History ==
The first wheel, the Roue de Paris, had originally operated in Paris. When the Birmingham installation opened to the public on Thursday 6 November 2003, the commentary provided was the original French version describing the sights of Paris.

The following year, Roue de Paris moved to Exchange Square, Manchester, and a new wheel was erected at the Birmingham site.

This second wheel was operated by World Tourist Attractions and had commentary by BRMB DJ Phil Upton. It had sealed carriages with air conditioning and heating, and a premium "VIP" car.

On 5 September 2006, the second wheel closed after it was sold to an Australian company; it was then dismantled and transported to Australia.

== Gallery ==
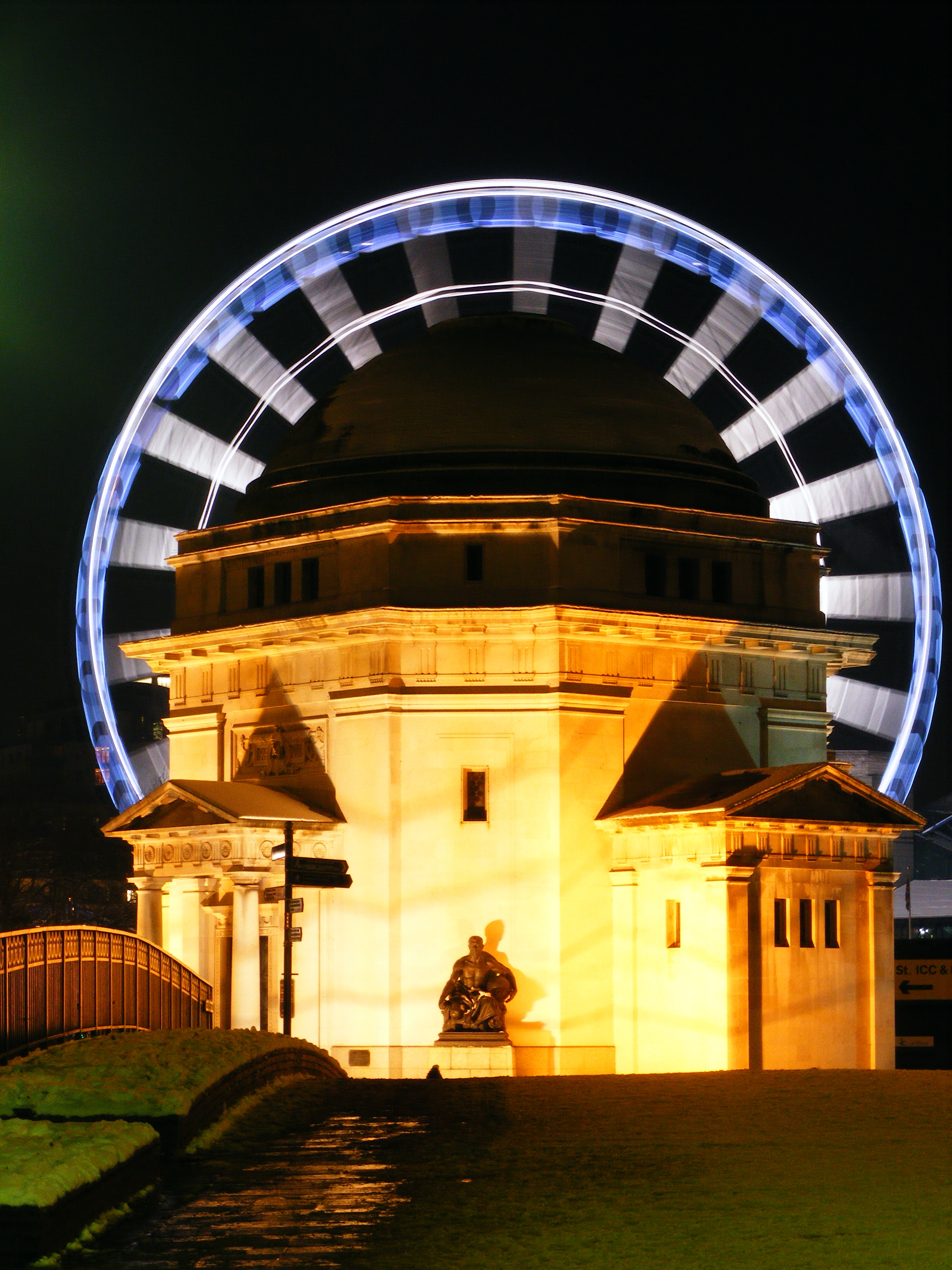
Birmingham Wheel behind the Hall of Memory

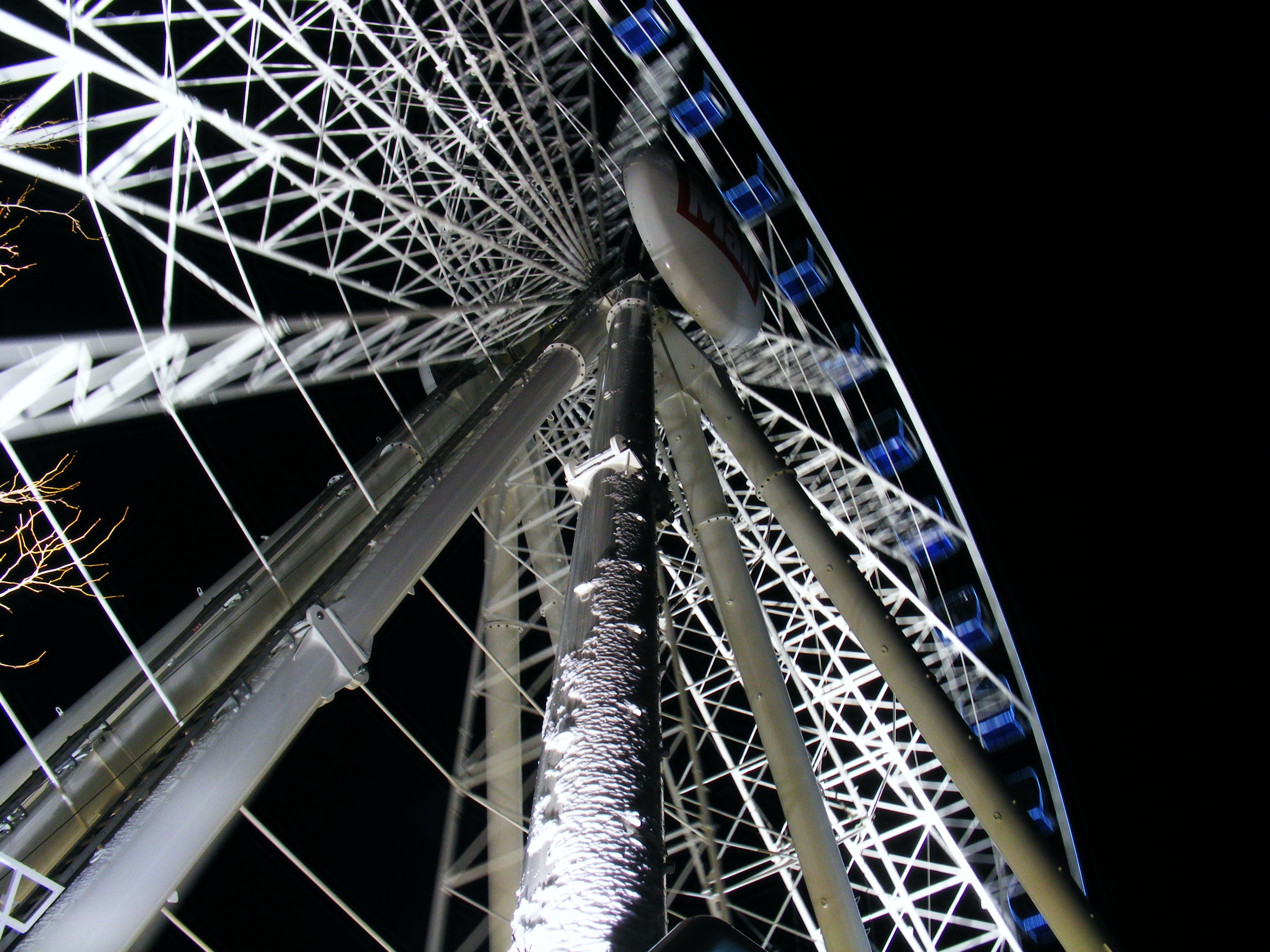
Birmingham Wheel night view

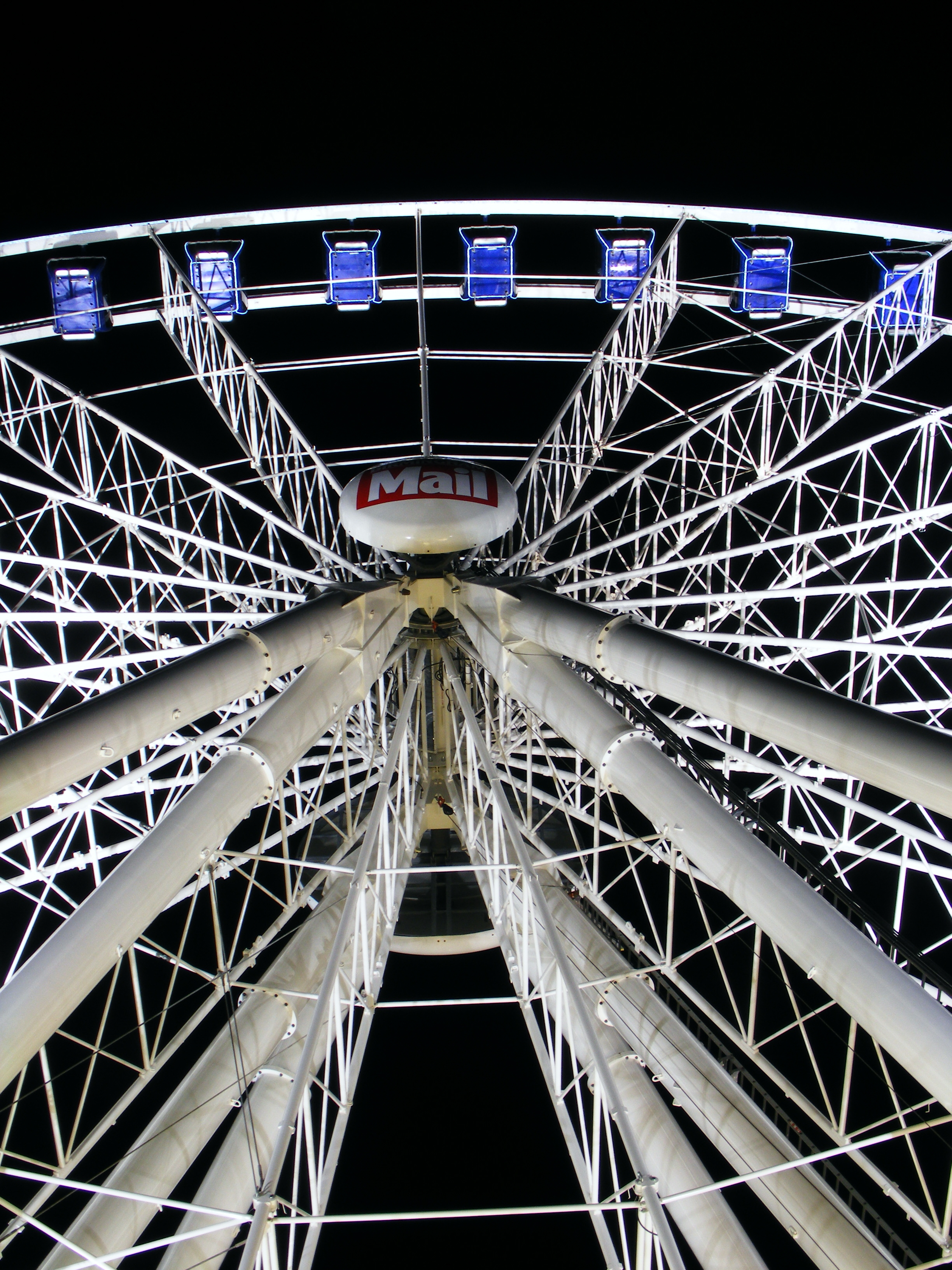
Birmingham Wheel night view

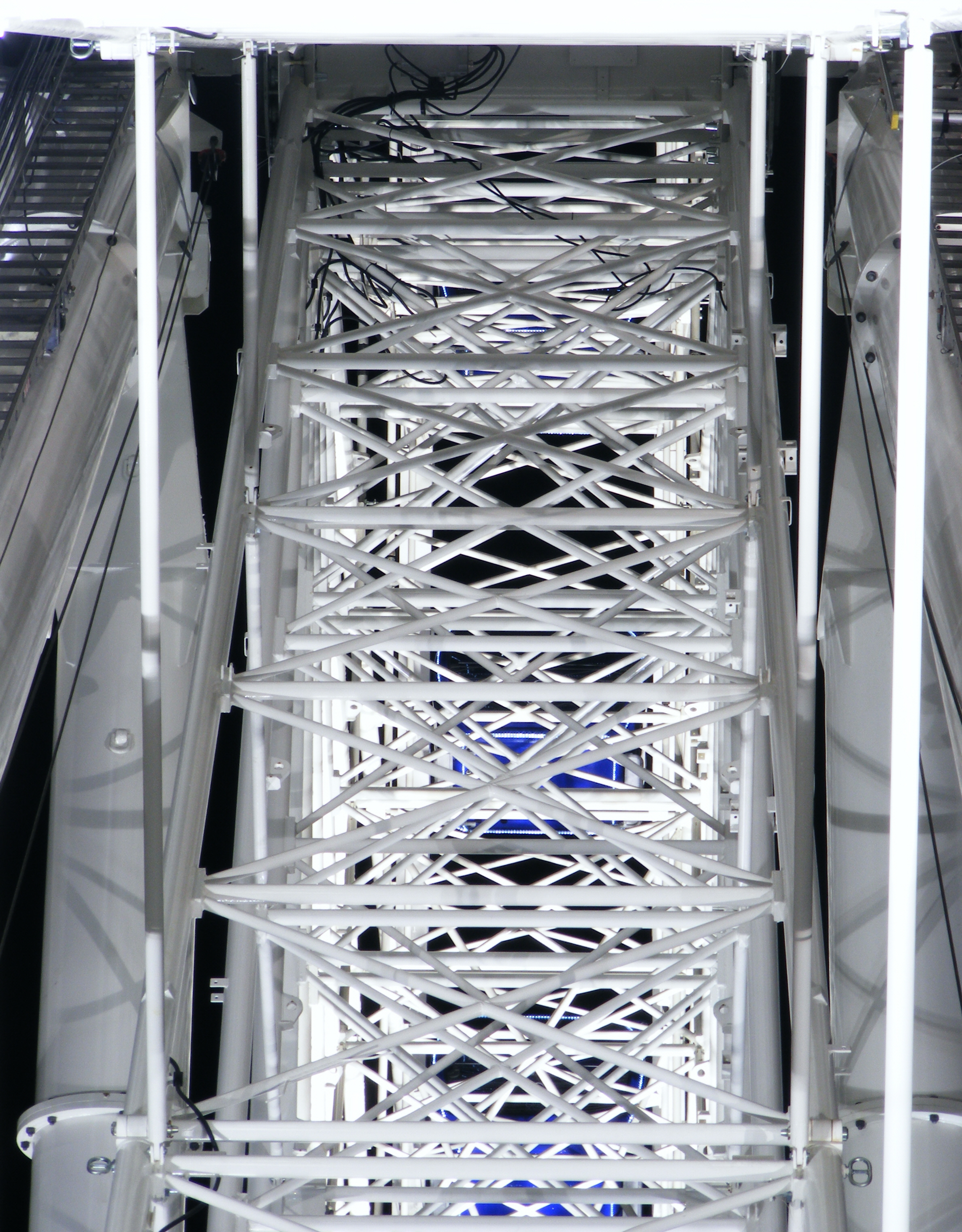
Inside the wheel structure

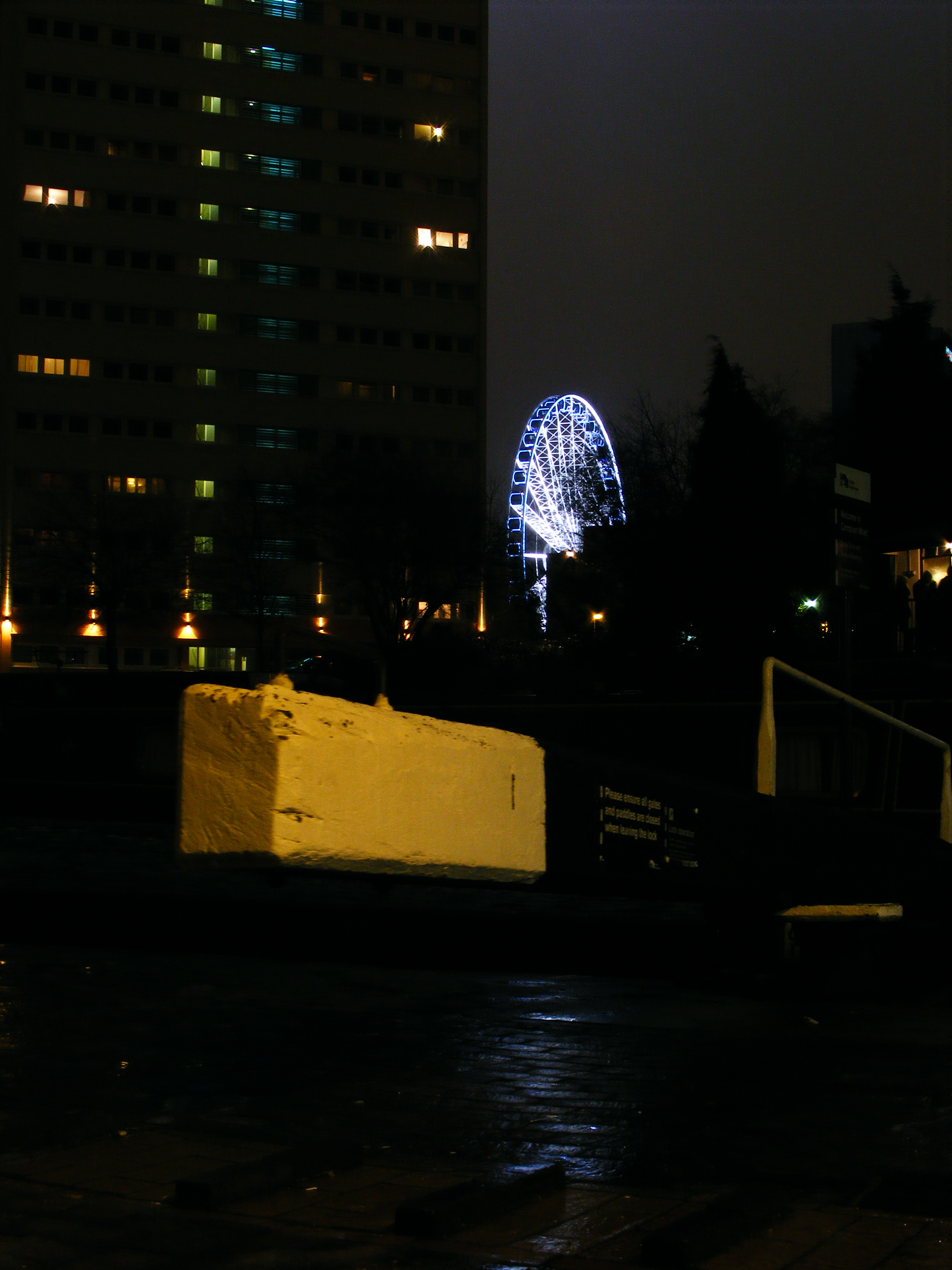
The Birmingham Wheel from Cambrian Wharf

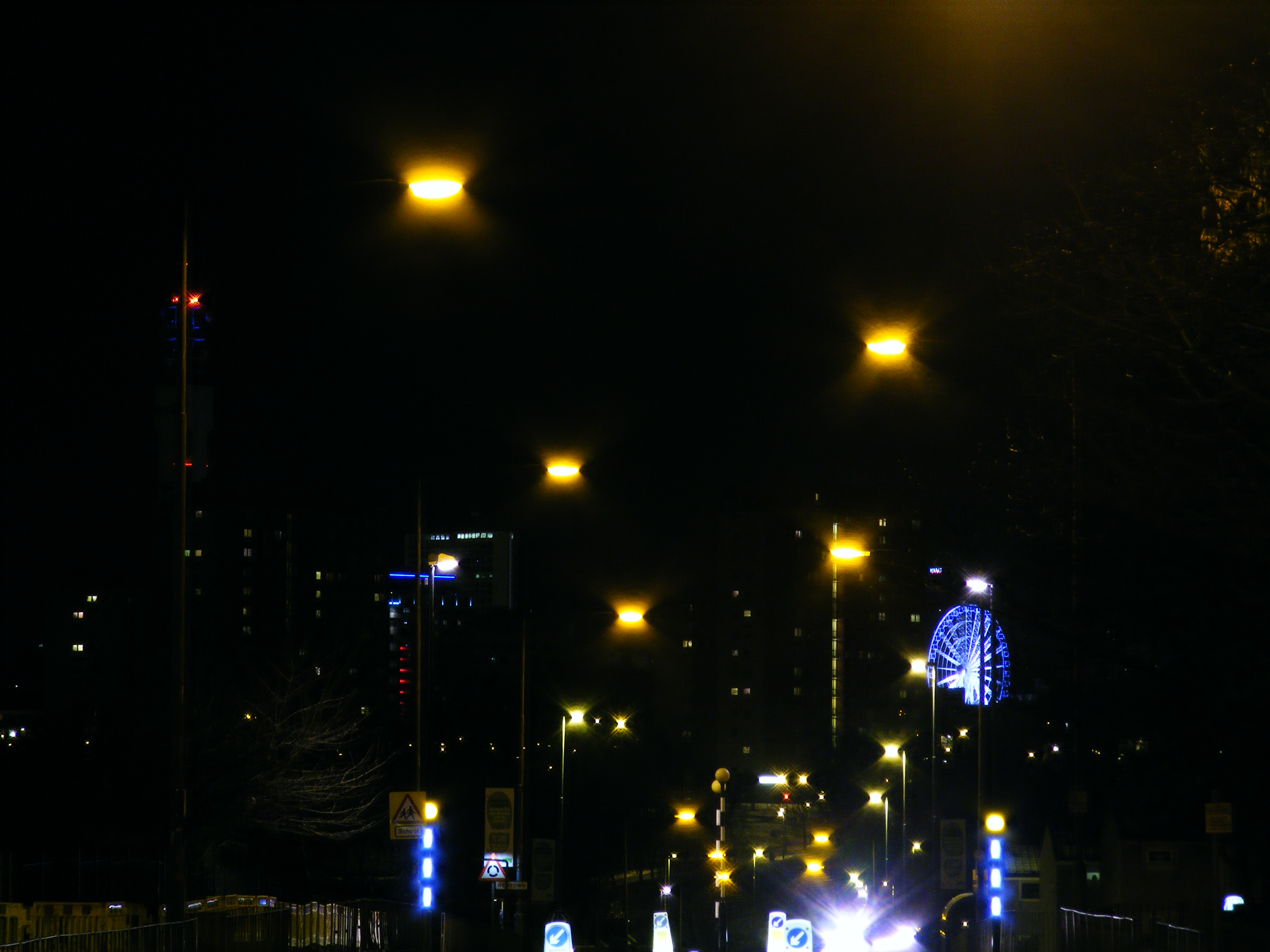
The Birmingham Wheel from Lozells

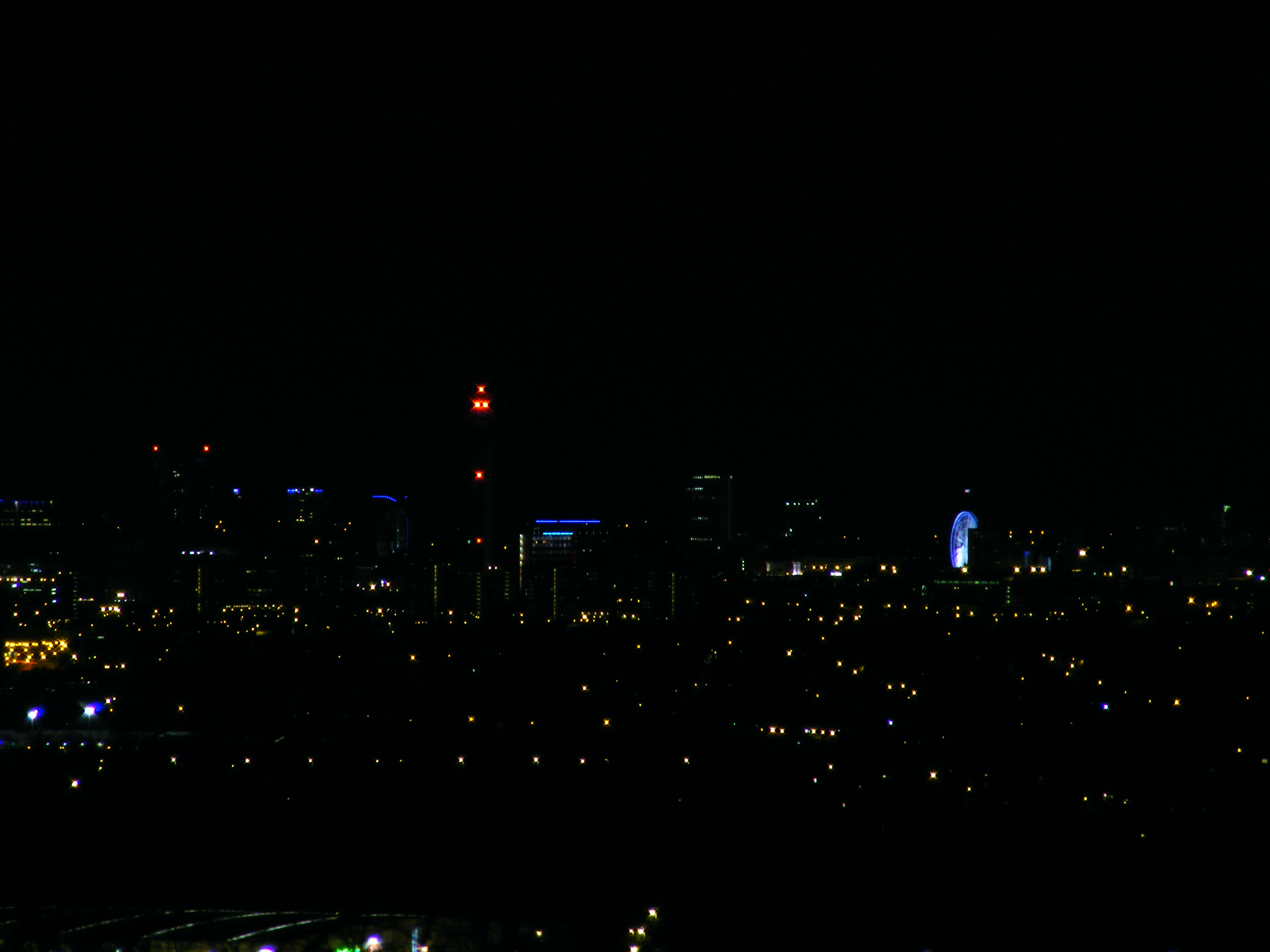
The Birmingham Wheel from Barr Beacon
