= Roue de Paris =

Transportable Ferris wheel

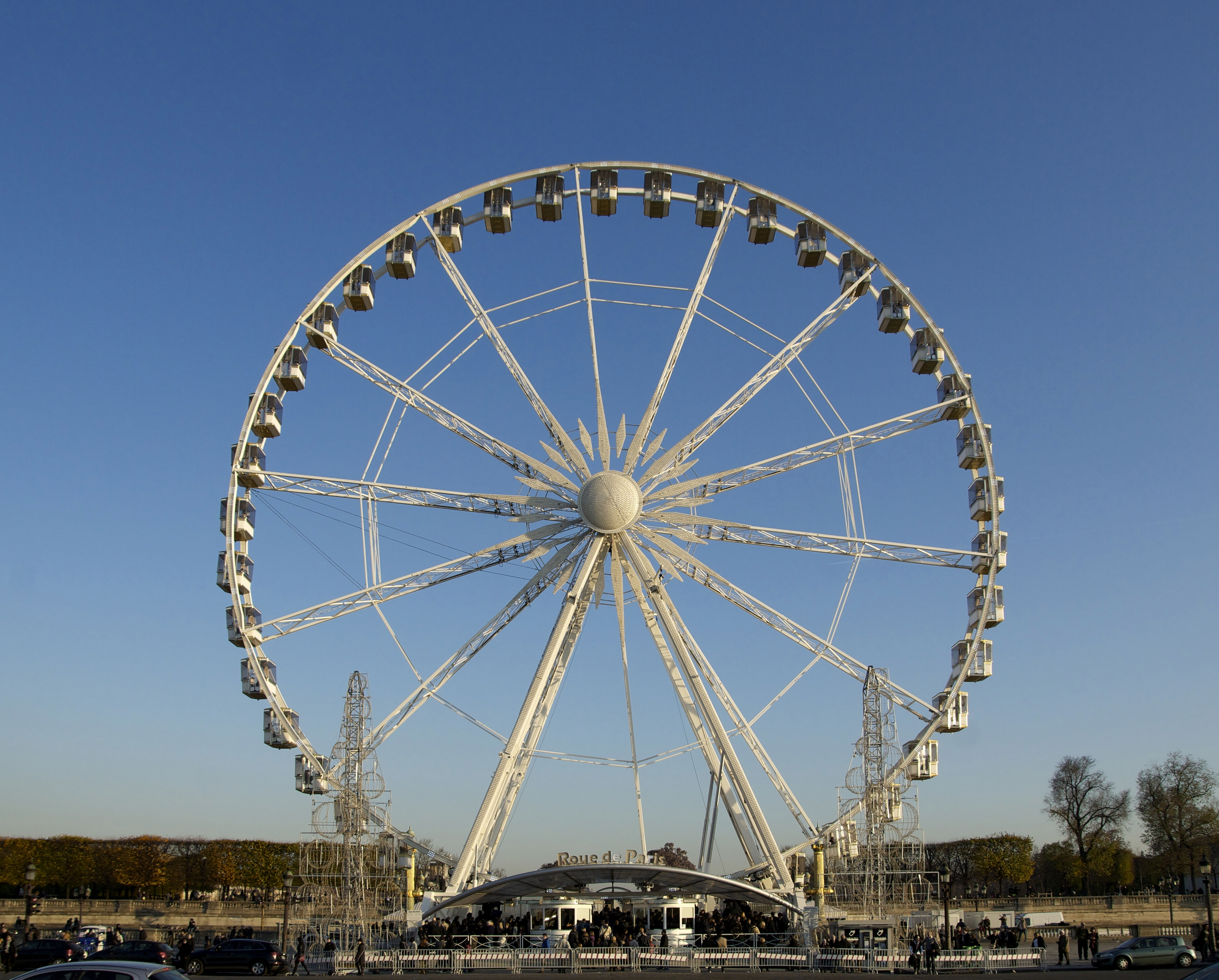
Roue de Paris on the Place de la Concorde, Paris, France

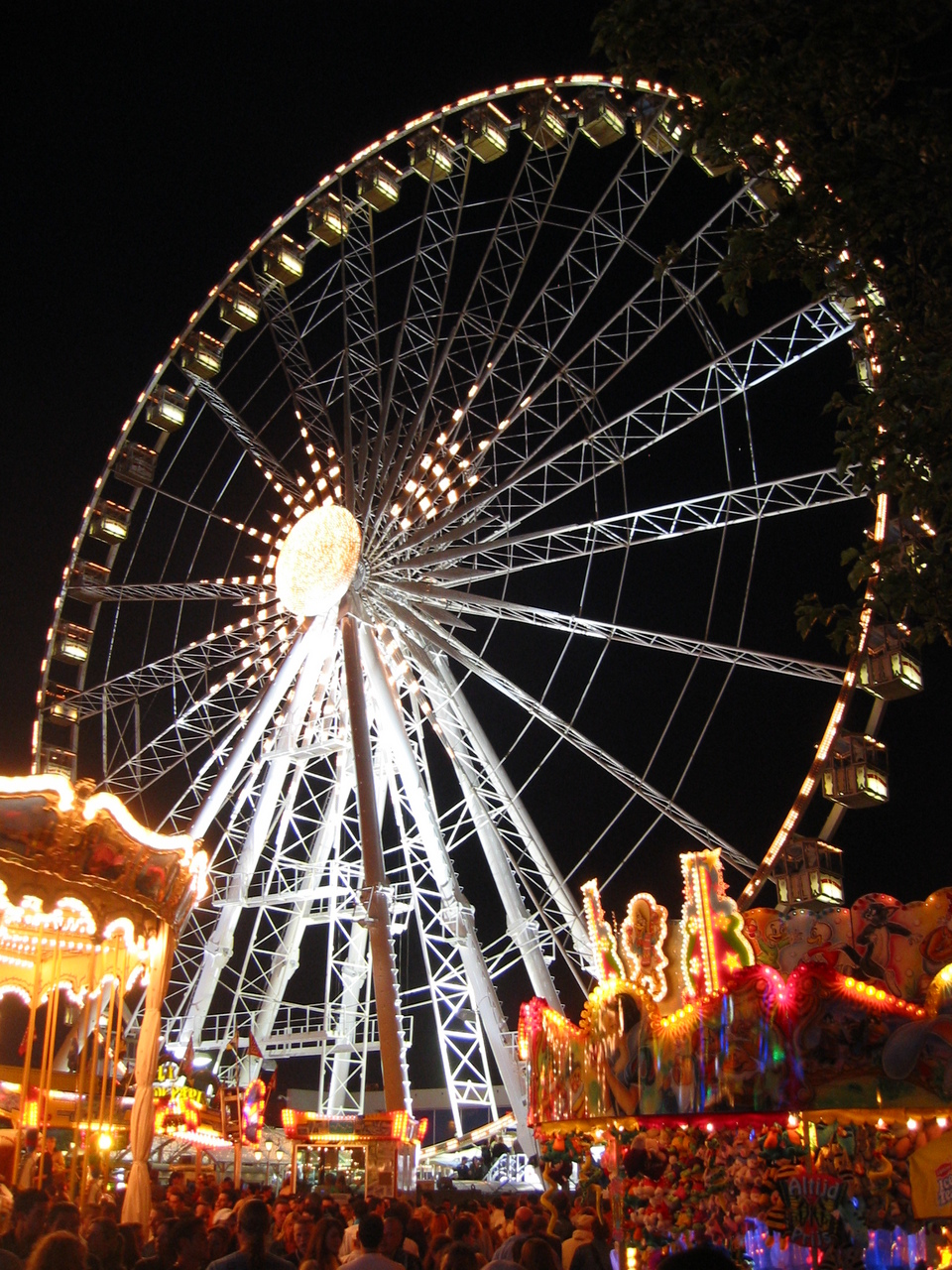
Roue de Paris in Geleen, the Netherlands

The Roue de Paris is a 60-metre (200 ft) tall transportable Ferris wheel, originally installed on the Place de la Concorde in Paris, France, for the 2000 millennium celebrations. It left Paris in 2002 and has since then seen service at numerous other locations around the world.

It is a Ronald Bussink series R60 wheel and needs no permanent foundations, instead 40,000 litres (8,800 imp gal; 11,000 US gal) (40 tonnes) of water ballast provide a stable base. It weighs 365 tonnes.

Due to its transportable design, it can be erected in 72 hours and dismantled in 60 hours by a specialist team. Transport requires seven 20-foot (6.1 m) container lorries, ten open trailer lorries, and one closed trailer lorry.

The forty-two gondolas can be loaded either three or six at a time, and each can accommodate eight passengers.

== Installations ==
- 2000–02: Place de la Concorde, Paris, France. (48.8651374°N 2.3220406°E).
- 2003–04: following its initial installation in France, the Roue de Paris was moved to Birmingham, England, where it was known as the Wheel of Birmingham. For Christmas 2004, it was moved to Exchange Square, Manchester, where it was known as the Wheel of Manchester.
- 2005: first the wheel went to the Netherlands, making a short visit to the World Town Fair in Geleen, followed by ten days at the Museumplein (Museum Square) in Amsterdam. It then went to Gateshead, England for the Tall Ships Race and stayed there until the end of September.
- 2006–07: the wheel was installed at the Suan Lum Night Bazaar in Bangkok, Thailand, and operated there until it was dismantled and removed in 2007.
- 2008: Antwerp, Belgium.
- 2013: Rimini, Italy.
- 2015: Ghent, Belgium, During Christmas and new year.
- 2016: Ghent, Belgium, During Christmas and new year.
- 2022: Cologne, Germany, March through June
- 2023: Paris, France, summer
