= Belfast Wheel =

Ferris wheel in Northern Ireland

Coordinates: 54°35′48.77″N 5°55′45.06″W

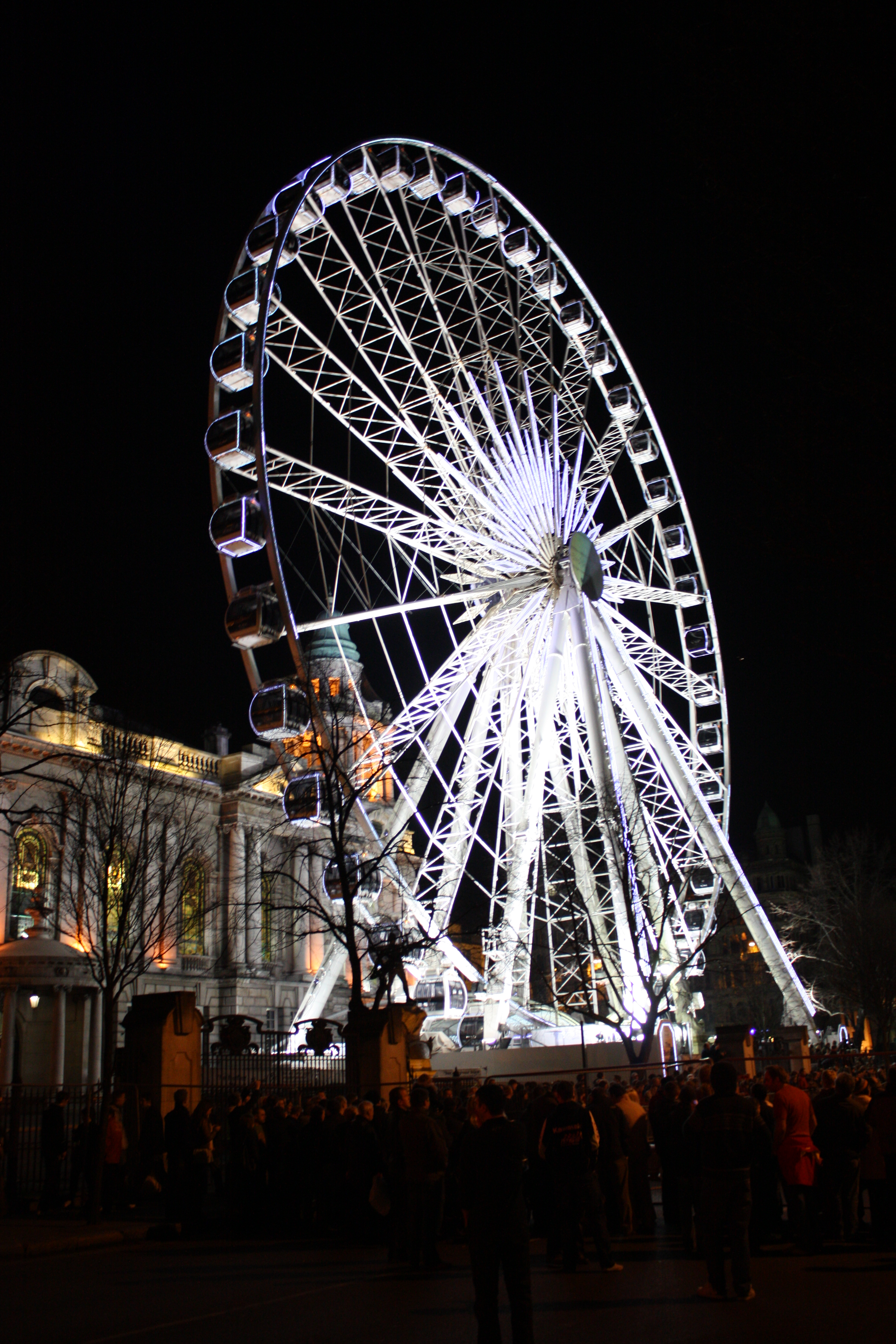
Belfast Wheel at night, March 2010

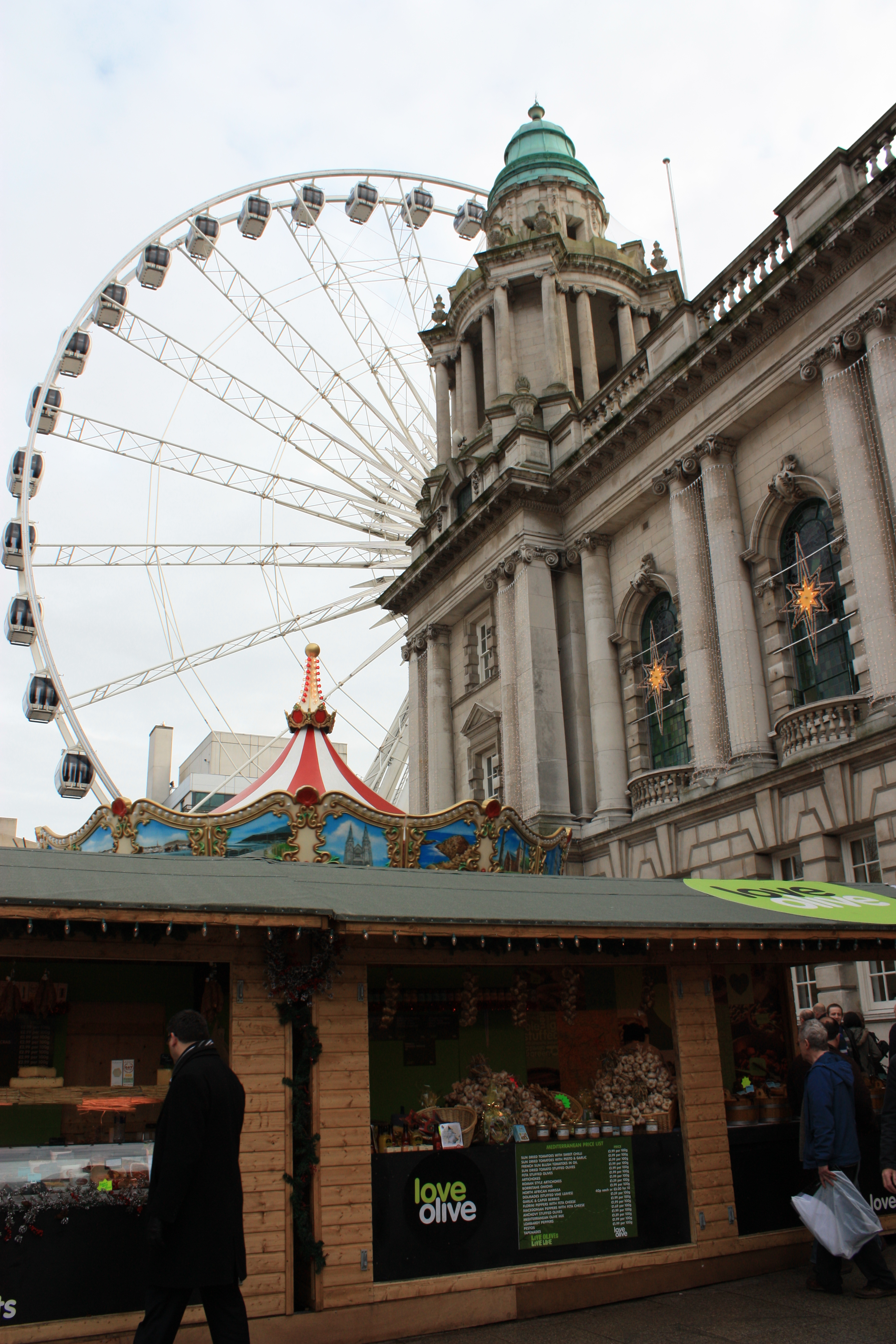
Belfast Wheel, City Hall and Continental Market, December 2009

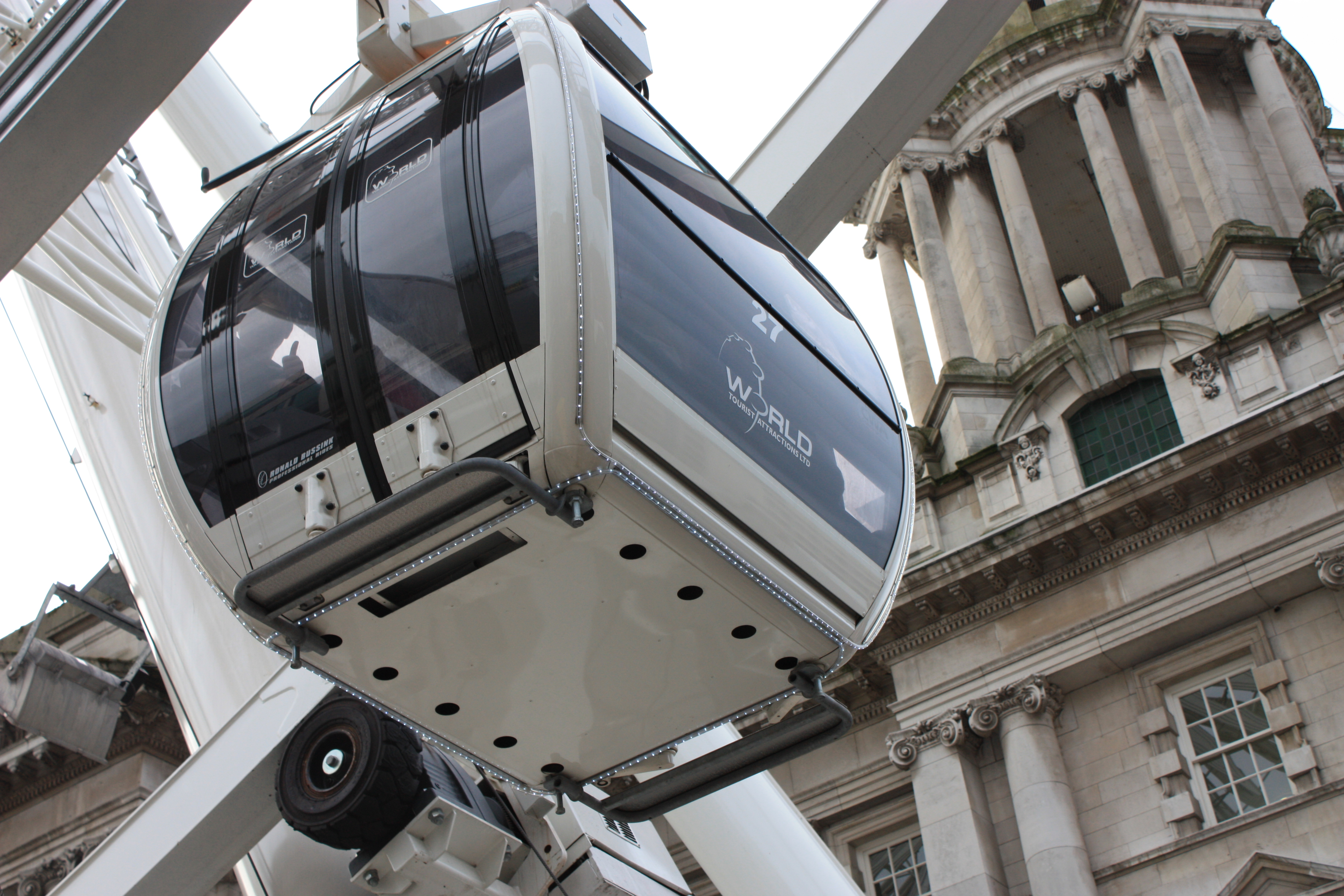
Belfast Wheel capsule and City Hall, December 2009

The Belfast Wheel was a 60-metre (200 ft) tall transportable Ferris wheel installation in the centre of Belfast, Northern Ireland, in the grounds on the east side of Belfast City Hall. It operated from November 2007 to April 2010.

== History ==
The Belfast Wheel was brought to Belfast in partnership with Belfast City Council and the Department for Social Development. It was operated by World Tourist Attractions.

It opened in November 2007 and operated seven days a week. Views right across Belfast and Belfast Lough could be seen.

In May 2009, Belfast City Council voted to keep the big wheel on site for a further two years, from 1 September 2009. On 30 November 2009, the location of the Belfast Wheel again caused a row, resulting in the Lord Mayor of Belfast Naomi Long discussing the potential move of the Titanic Memorial before the 2012 anniversary.

The Belfast Wheel closed for business on Sunday 11 April 2010. The operator, Great City Attractions, had announced a few weeks previously that it would be removed.
