= Oldham Metrolink station =

Oldham Metrolink station may refer to:

== Metrolink tram stops ==
- Oldham Mumps tram stop, a station on Greater Manchester's Metrolink system which opened in 2014
- Oldham Central tram stop
- Oldham King Street tram stop
- Westwood tram stop

== Historic railway stations ==
- Oldham Central railway station closed 1966
- Oldham Clegg Street railway station closed 1968
- Oldham Glodwick Road railway station closed 1955
- Oldham Mumps railway station closed 2009
- Oldham Mumps railway station (London and North Western Railway) closed 1862
- Oldham Werneth railway station closed 2009
