= Hollinwood tram stop =

Manchester Metrolink tram stop

Hollinwood
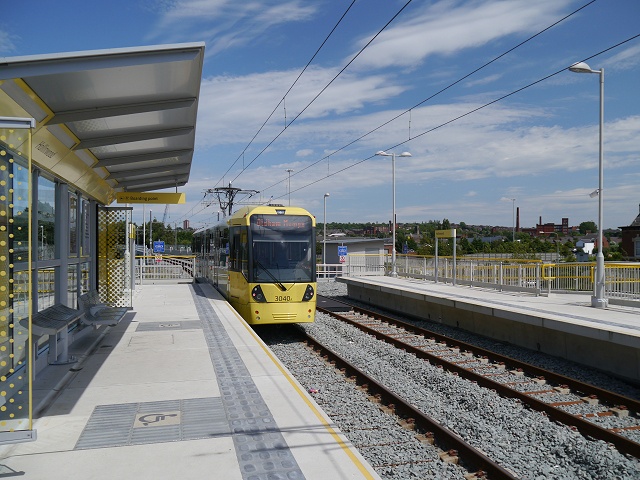
- Bombardier M5000 tram pulling into Hollinwood

General information
- Location: Hollinwood, Oldham; England
- Coordinates: 53.52001°N 2.14730°W
- Grid reference: SD903026
- System: Metrolink station
- Line: Oldham and Rochdale Line
- Platforms: 2

Other information
- Status: In operation
- Fare zone: 3

History
- Opened: 17 May 1880
- Original company: Lancashire and Yorkshire Railway
- Pre-grouping: Lancashire and Yorkshire Railway
- Post-grouping: London, Midland and Scottish Railway

Key dates
- 3 October 2009: Closed as a rail station
- 13 June 2012: Conversion to Metrolink operation
Route map
Location

Hollinwood tram stop is a tram stop and park & ride site on the Manchester Metrolink Oldham and Rochdale Line in Hollinwood, Greater Manchester, England. It was formerly a railway station before its conversion to a tram stop between 2009 and 2012.

== History ==
Hollinwood railway station opened on 17 May 1880, situated in the Hollinwood area of the Metropolitan Borough of Oldham, in Greater Manchester, England. The station was 4 1/2 miles (7 km) north east of Manchester Victoria on the Oldham Loop Line operated and managed by Northern Rail.

The station was next to the M60 motorway Manchester Outer Ring Road which was constructed across part of the former station site. As a consequence of this the station was rebuilt by the Highways Agency in the 1990s.

The station closed for the conversion of the line to a Metrolink tram stop on 3 October 2009 and was rebuilt, reopening as Hollinwood tram stop on 13 June 2012.

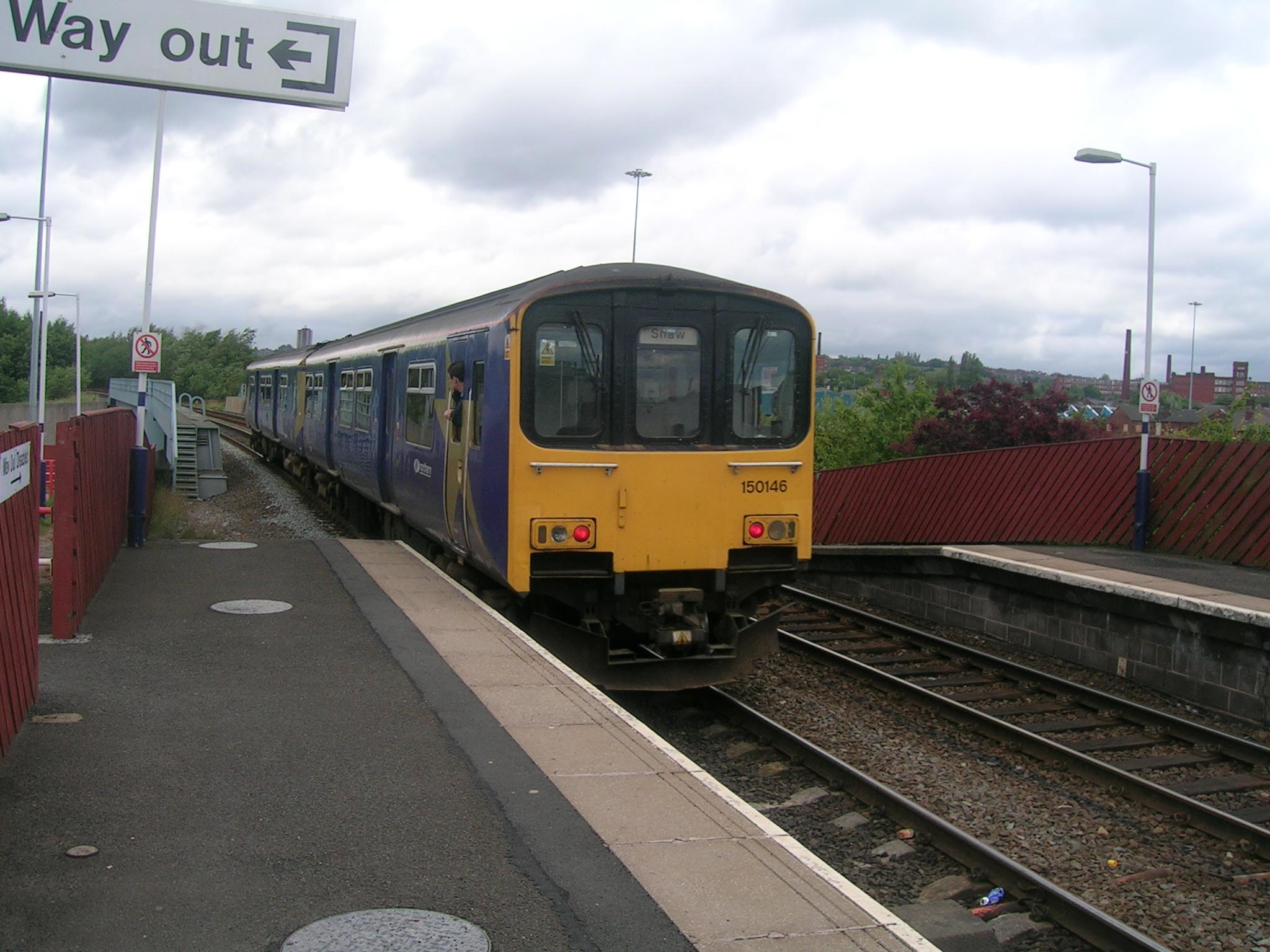
Hollinwood station prior to Metrolink conversion

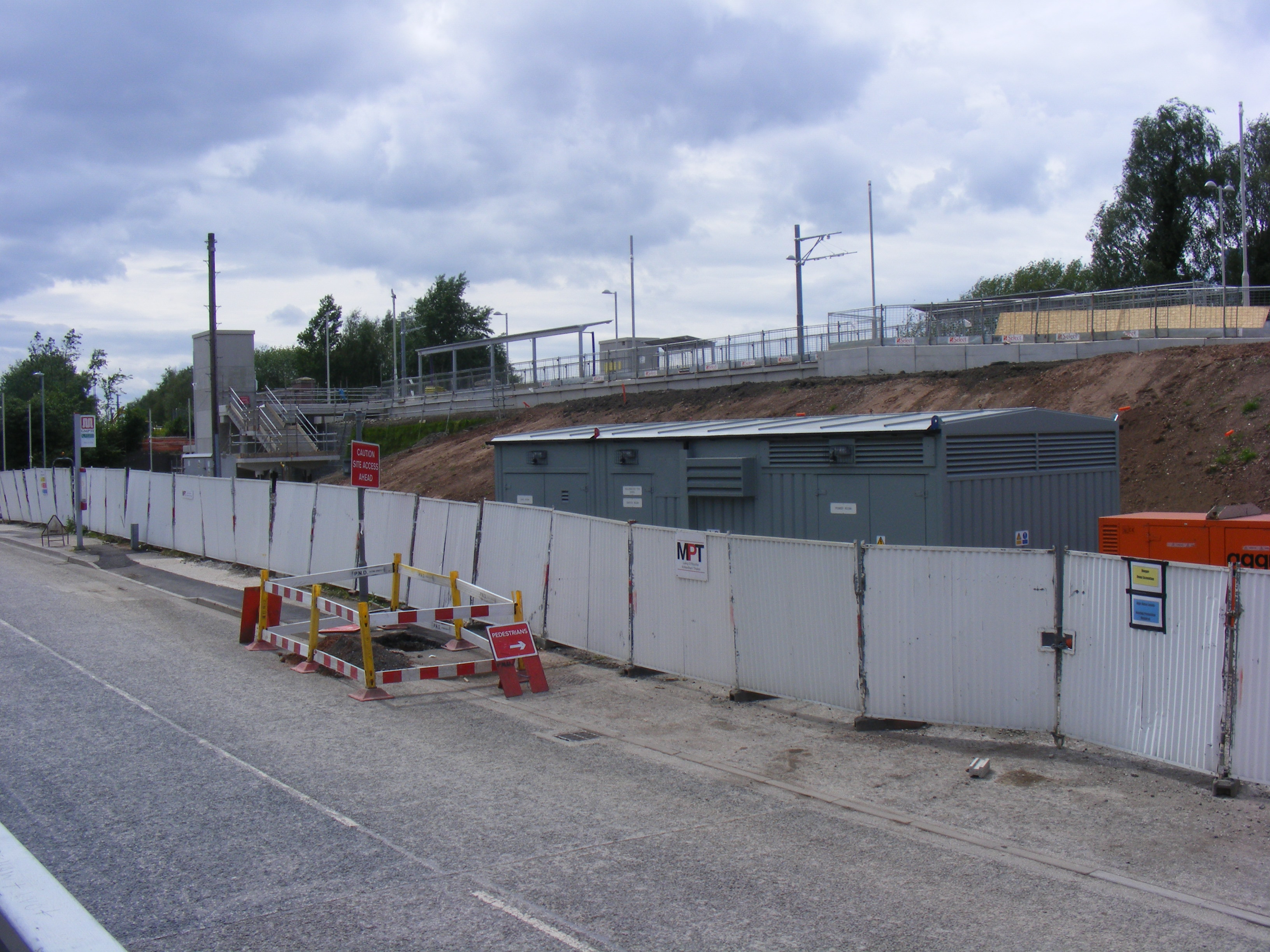
Under construction on the site of the former railway station

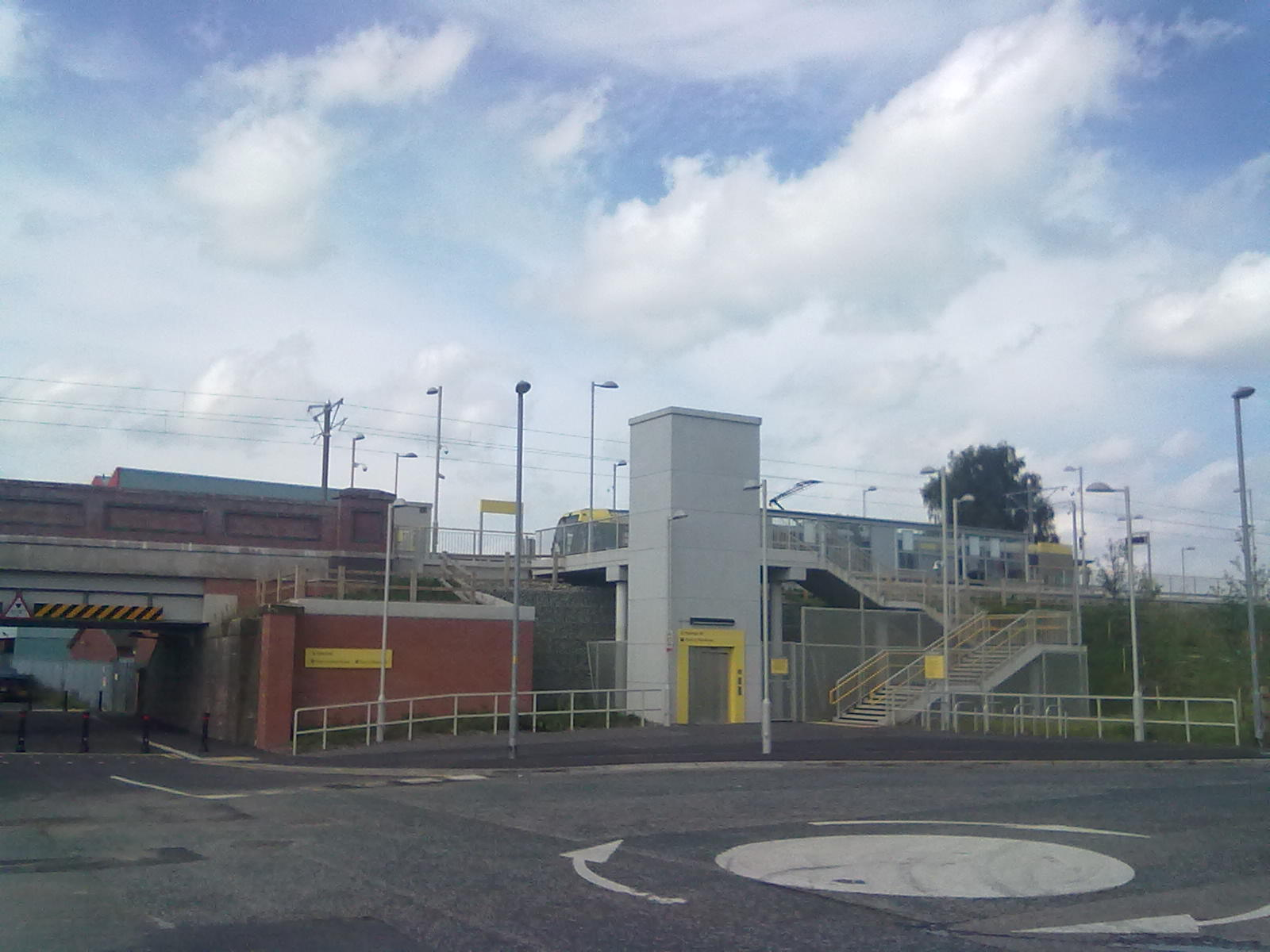
Hollinwood station in September 2012

== Former railway service ==
After May 1995 Hollinwood was served by half-hourly trains from Manchester Victoria to Shaw & Crompton. Trains to Rochdale ran every half-hour but passed through Hollinwood without stopping. On Sundays there was an hourly service in each direction.

== Service pattern ==
Preceding station	Manchester Metrolink	Following station
Failsworth towards East Didsbury	East Didsbury–Rochdale	South Chadderton towards Rochdale Town Centre
Failsworth towards East Didsbury	East Didsbury–Shaw (peak only)	South Chadderton towards Shaw and Crompton
Historical railways
Failsworth	Lancashire & Yorkshire Railway; Oldham Loop Line	Oldham Werneth

== Connecting bus routes ==
Hollinwood station is served by First Greater Manchester service 149, which stops nearby on Tweedale Way and runs to Oldham via Coppice and to North Manchester General Hospital via Moston and Cheetham Hill. Stotts Tours service 151 stops at the other end of Tweedale Way with the 151 running to Hightown via Failsworth, Newton Heath and Cheetham Hill.

On Manchester Road, First services 83, 180 and 184 provide frequent buses between Manchester and Oldham with the 83 continuing to Sholver and the 180/184 running to Saddleworth plus Huddersfield (184), while First service X84 provides a peak-time express service to Manchester and Saddleworth. Stotts Tours service 159 runs to Oldham via Chadderton and Middleton via Failsworth, while Stotts service 396 runs to Ashton-under-Lyne via Hathershaw and to Newton Heath via Failsworth.
