= South Chadderton tram stop =

Manchester Metrolink tram stop

South Chadderton
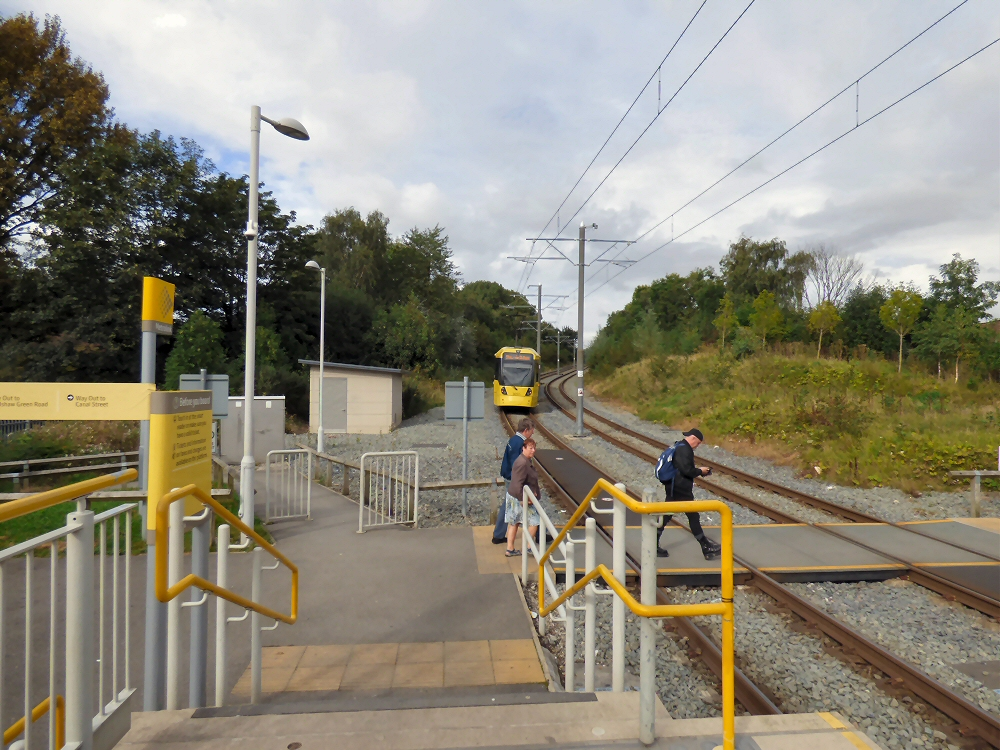
- View to the north from the Rochdale platform.

General information
- Location: Chadderton, Oldham, England
- Coordinates: 53.52673°N 2.14517°W
- System: Manchester Metrolink
- Operator: KeolisAmey
- Transit authority: Transport for Greater Manchester
- Line: Oldham and Rochdale Line
- Platforms: 2
- Tram routes

Construction
- Structure type: At-grade
- Accessible: Yes

Other information
- Status: In operation
- Station code: -
- Fare zone: 3
- Website: South Chadderton tram stop

History
- Opened: 13 June 2012; 14 years ago
Route map
Location

South Chadderton is a Manchester Metrolink tram stop in Coalshaw Green, Chadderton, Oldham. It is on the Oldham and Rochdale Line and in fare zone 3. This stop was opened on 13 June 2012 as part of Phase 3a of the system's expansion and it has step-free access.

It is located at street-level, and is near to Coalshaw Green Park. It was also purpose-built for Metrolink on the route of the former Oldham Loop Line: the tram stop itself is not a converted railway station unlike some other tram stops along the Oldham and Rochdale Line.

== History ==
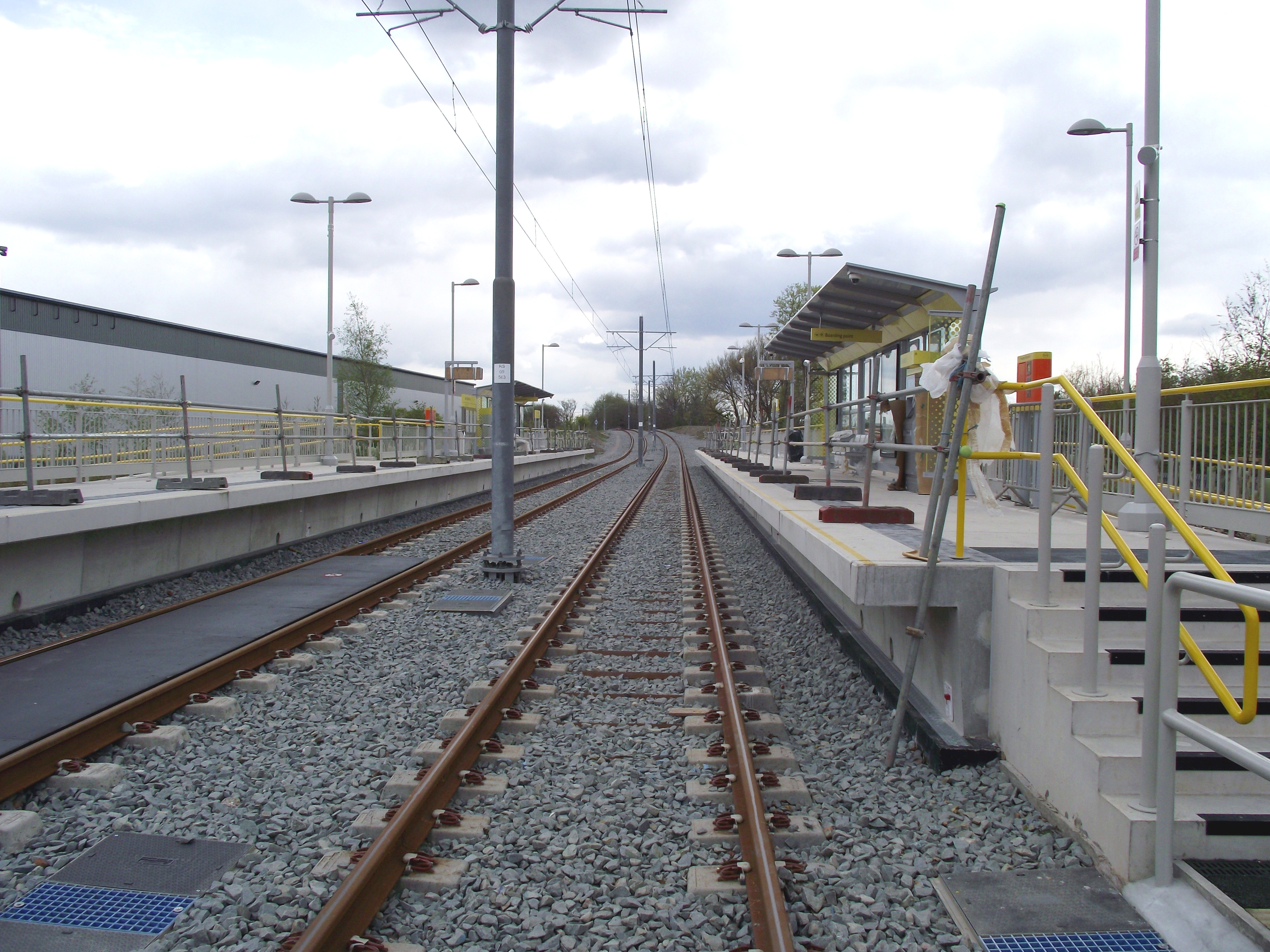
South Chadderton one month prior to opening, May 2012.

Beginning May 1880, the Oldham Loop railway line operated through this area. The railway line was included in proposals in 1984 for conversion to light rail, and following October 2009, the entire line closed for conversion to Metrolink operation.

A brand new station was planned to be constructed at South Chadderton, however the railway line was high above street-level at the optimal location, which would have made building a fully accessible tram stop difficult.

The original alignment was modified between 2009 and 2012 between the Drury Lane and Stanley Road rail bridges so that South Chadderton stop could be built at street-level instead. This change is made obvious by steep inclines uphill for trams upon leaving South Chadderton in both directions, at 1:29. A similar change was also done at Newbold tram stop further north up the line.

== Layout ==
South Chadderton has two side platforms serving two tracks and was constructed with accessibility in mind. There are three entrances to the station via pedestrian track crossings and ramps, and used to have bicycle lockers until around 2022.

Two dot matrix passenger information displays stand on one platform each, showing estimated arrival times for trams in minutes up to 30 minutes prior (up to three at a time) and number of carriages.

== Services ==
Every route across the Manchester Metrolink network operates to a 12-minute headway (5 tph) Monday–Saturday, and to a 15-minute headway (4 tph) on Sundays and bank holidays. Sections served by a second "peak only" route (like this stop) will have a combined headway of 6 minutes during peak times.

South Chadderton is located in Zone 3, and the stop itself has two platforms which aren't named. The outbound platform (west) serves trams to Shaw and Rochdale via Oldham, and the inbound platform (east) serves trams towards Manchester, heading to East Didsbury via Exchange Square.

Preceding station	Manchester Metrolink	Following station
Hollinwood towards East Didsbury	East Didsbury–Rochdale	Freehold towards Rochdale Town Centre
Hollinwood towards East Didsbury	East Didsbury–Shaw (peak only)	Freehold towards Shaw and Crompton

== Transport connections ==
=== Bus ===
South Chadderton tram stop is served closest by Bee Network bus routes 81 (Manchester–Oldham) on Coalshaw Green Road, and 159 (Middleton–Oldham) on Stanley Road.

=== Train ===
This tram stop is not connected to or near to any railway stations, but the nearest is Moston, about 2 miles (3.2 km) away walking.
