= Oldham station =

Oldham Station may refer to a number of railway stations in Oldham

- Oldham Central railway station closed 1966
- Oldham Clegg Street railway station closed 1968
- Oldham Glodwick Road railway station closed 1955
- Oldham Mumps railway station closed 2009
- Oldham Mumps railway station (London and North Western Railway) closed 1862
- Oldham Werneth railway station closed 2009

It may also refer to the following Manchester Metrolink stops

- Oldham Central tram stop
- Oldham King Street tram stop
- Oldham Mumps tram stop
