= Failsworth tram stop =

Manchester Metrolink tram stop

Failsworth
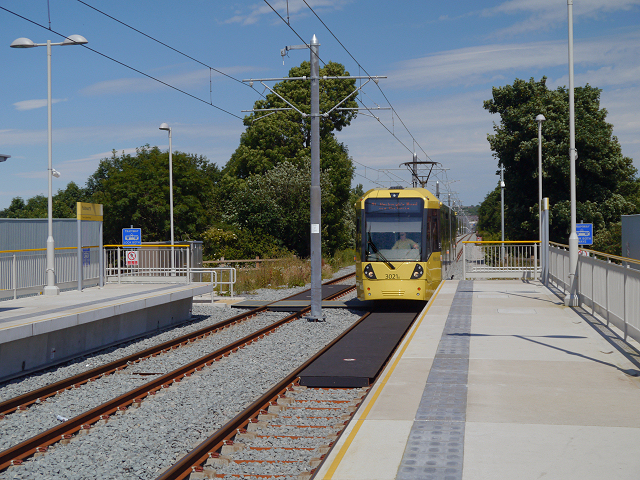
- A Bombardier M5000 tram approaching Failsworth tram stop

General information
- Location: Failsworth, Oldham; England
- Coordinates: 53.51063°N 2.16289°W
- Grid reference: SD893016
- System: Metrolink station
- Line: Oldham and Rochdale Line
- Platforms: 2

Other information
- Status: In operation
- Fare zone: 3

History
- Opened: 26 April 1881
- Original company: Lancashire and Yorkshire Railway
- Pre-grouping: Lancashire and Yorkshire Railway
- Post-grouping: London, Midland and Scottish Railway

Key dates
- 3 October 2009: Closed as a rail station
- 13 June 2012: Conversion to Metrolink operation
Route map
Location

Failsworth tram stop is a Manchester Metrolink tram stop on the Oldham and Rochdale Line serving the town of Failsworth, Greater Manchester, England. It was formerly a railway station before its conversion to Metrolink in 2012.

== History ==
Failsworth railway station opened on 26 April 1881 and was situated in Failsworth, in the Metropolitan Borough of Oldham, Greater Manchester, England. It was notable for its wooden platforms. The station was on the Oldham Loop Line 3 1/2 miles (6 km) north east of Manchester Victoria, and was operated and managed by Northern Rail at the time of its closure.

The station closed on 3 October 2009 to enable the line to be converted to a Metrolink service. It was rebuilt and reopened as Failsworth tram stop on 13 June 2012.

On 6 February 2013, a pedestrian died after a collision with a tram at the stop.

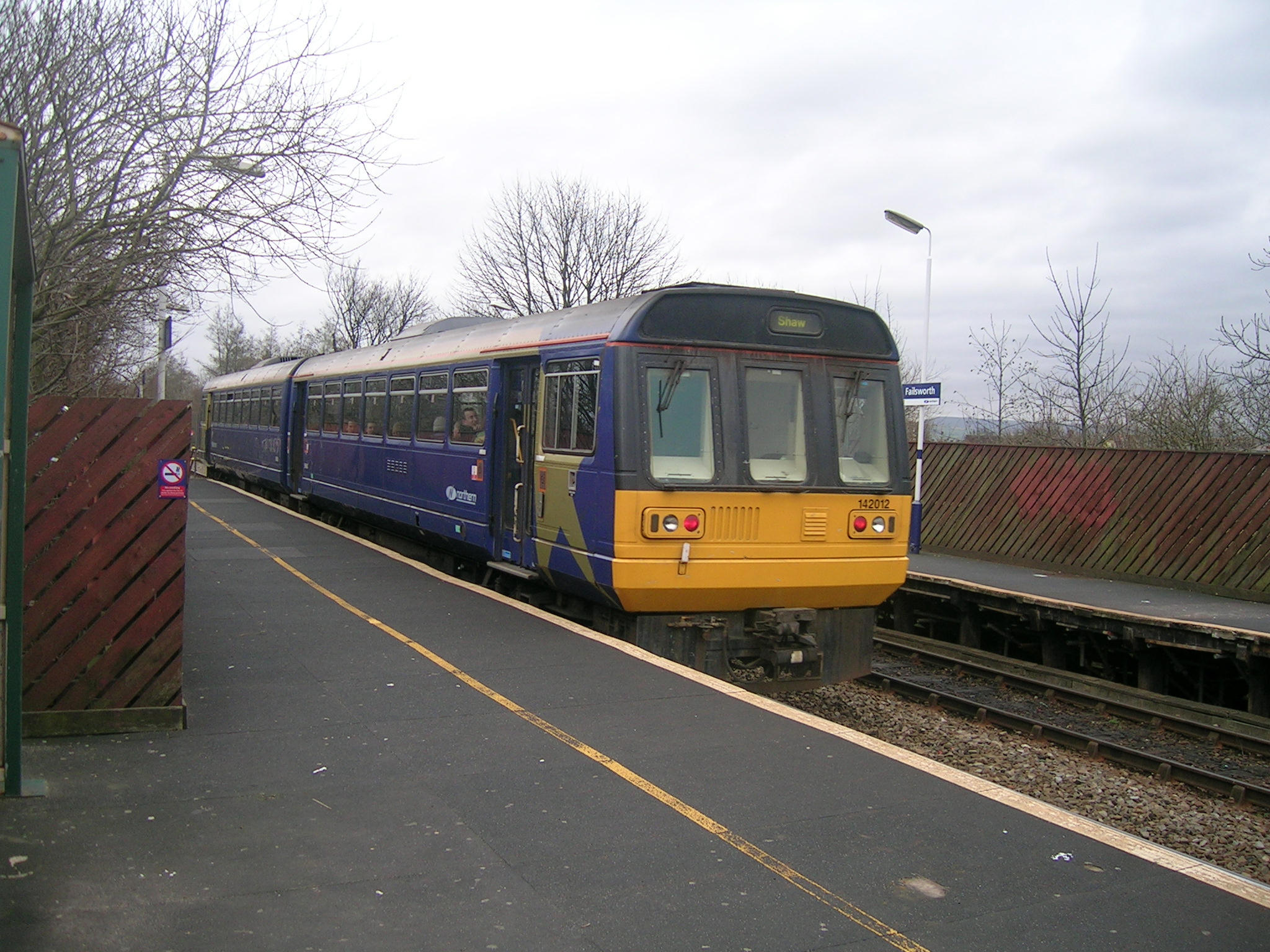
Station prior to main line railway closure

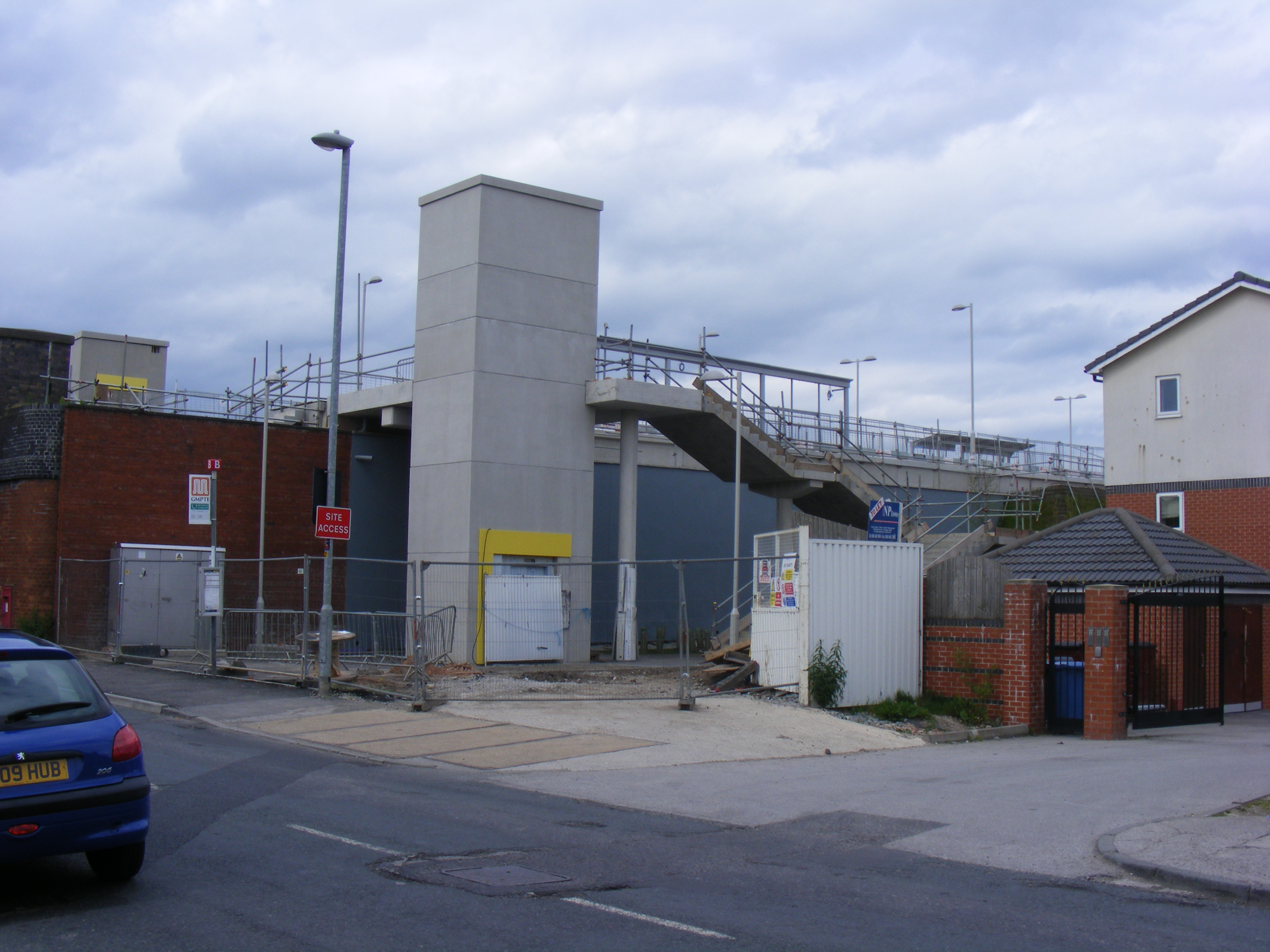
Station exterior during Metrolink construction

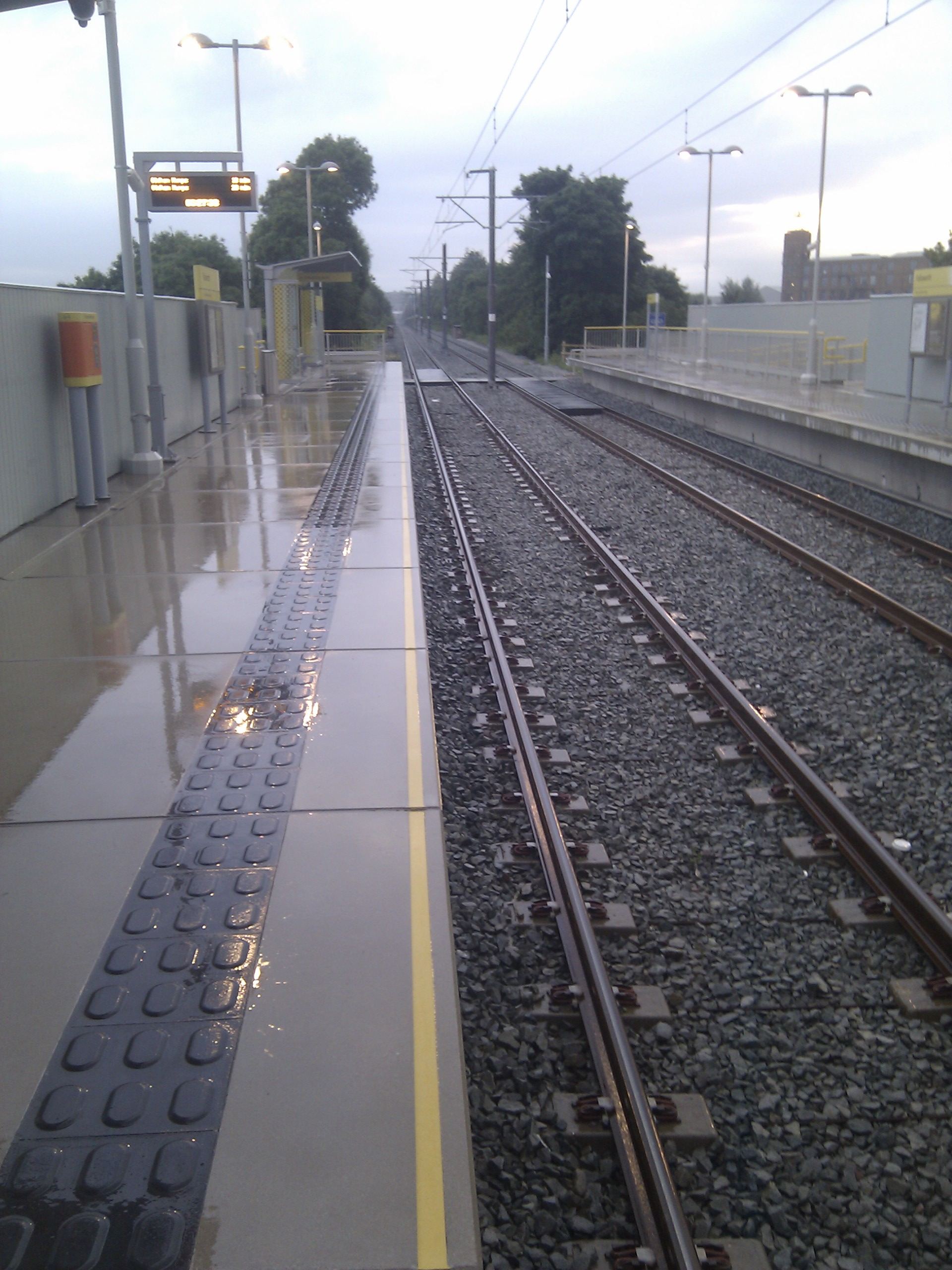
The station after conversion to Metrolink

== Service pattern ==
- 12 minute service to Shaw & Crompton with double trams in the peak
- 12 minute service to Rochdale Town Centre with double trams in the peak
- 6 minute service to East Didsbury with double trams in the peak

Preceding station	Manchester Metrolink	Following station
Newton Heath and Moston towards East Didsbury	East Didsbury–Rochdale	Hollinwood towards Rochdale Town Centre
Newton Heath and Moston towards East Didsbury	East Didsbury–Shaw (peak only)	Hollinwood towards Shaw and Crompton
Historical railways
Dean Lane	Lancashire & Yorkshire Railway; Oldham Loop Line	Hollinwood

== Connecting bus routes ==
Failsworth station is served by two direct bus service but several services also stop nearby. Stotts Tours route 151 runs northbound to Hollinwood via New Moston and southbound to Hightown via Newton Heath, Harpurhey and Cheetham Hill. Stotts Tours route 159 also stops outside and runs northbound to Middleton via New Moston and southbound to Oldham via Woodhouses, Hollinwood and Chadderton.

On Oldham Road, First Greater Manchester routes 83, 180 and 184 provide frequent and direct buses between Manchester and Oldham with the 83 continuing to Sholver and the 180/184 running to Saddleworth plus Huddersfield (184).
