= Freehold tram stop =

Manchester Metrolink tram stop

Freehold
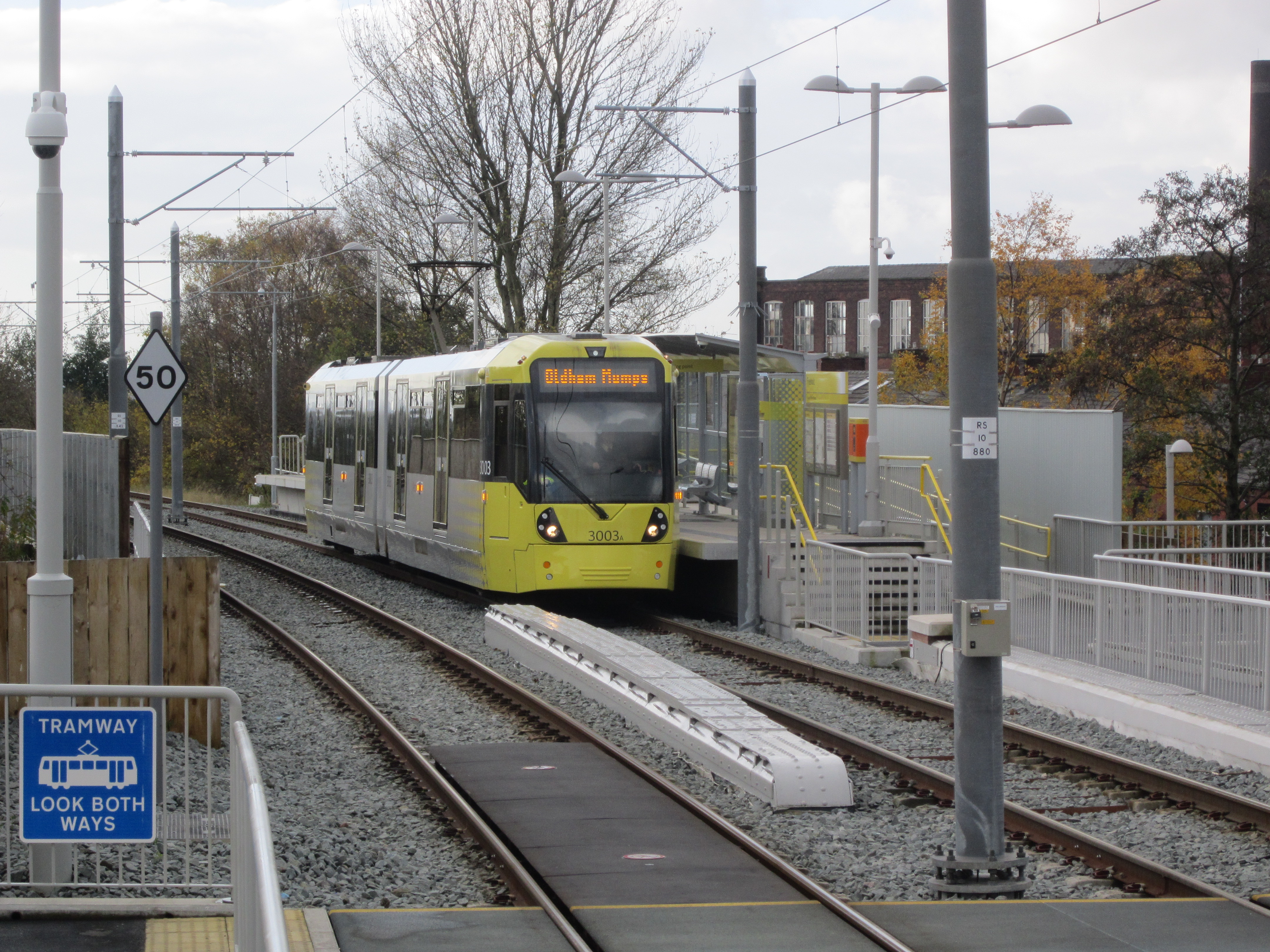
- An M5000 arrives at Freehold tram stop, in November 2012

General information
- Location: Chadderton, Oldham; England
- Coordinates: 53.53772°N 2.13796°W
- System: Metrolink station
- Line: Oldham and Rochdale Line
- Platforms: 2

Other information
- Status: In operation
- Fare zone: 3

History
- Opened: 13 June 2012
- Original company: Metrolink
Route map
Location

Freehold is a tram stop on the Oldham and Rochdale Line (ORL) of Greater Manchester's light-rail Metrolink system. It opened to passengers on 13 June 2012 as part of Phase 3a of the system's expansion, and is located on Block Lane in Chadderton at its boundary with Oldham in the Metropolitan Borough of Oldham, England.

Freehold tram stop serves the Cowhill and Block Lane areas of Chadderton and the adjacent Freehold area of Werneth, Oldham from which the station takes its name. The names Cowhill and Block Lane were also considered as names for the stop prior to opening, the local council finally opting for the name Freehold. The stop is one of the newly built stops on what was the Oldham Loop Line.

== Services ==
Preceding station	Manchester Metrolink	Following station
South Chadderton towards East Didsbury	East Didsbury–Rochdale	Westwood towards Rochdale Town Centre
South Chadderton towards East Didsbury	East Didsbury–Shaw (peak only)	Westwood towards Shaw and Crompton

== Connecting bus routes ==
Freehold station is served by service 159 which stops outside the station on Block Lane. The 159 heads northbound to Chadderton town centre, continuing to Oldham, and runs southbound to Hollinwood, continuing to Middleton via Woodhouses, Failsworth and New Moston.

On nearby Denton Lane, Cowhill, service 415 provides a direct link to Middleton and Oldham, while the 396 provides a link to Chadderton and Middleton plus to Ashton-under-Lyne via Hathershaw.

All services operated by Bee Network.
