= Rochdale Metrolink station =

Rochdale Metrolink station could refer to:

- Rochdale Town Centre Metrolink station
- Rochdale railway station Metrolink station
