= Cop Road tram stop =

Tram station in Oldham, England

Cop Road

General information
- Location: Moorside, Oldham; England
- Coordinates: 53.56395°N 2.09275°W
- System: Metrolink station
- Line: Oldham and Rochdale Line
- Platforms: 2

Other information
- Fare zone: 4
Route map
Location

Cop Road is a proposed tram stop on the Oldham and Rochdale Line of Greater Manchester's Metrolink light rail system. It will be situated between Derker, Shaw and Crompton.

== Background ==
The proposal for the Cop Road tram is outlined in the Greater Manchester Spatial Framework and aims to support proposed developments at Broadbent Moss and Beal Valley.

Funding from Transport for Greater Manchester was confirmed for the stop in June 2025.

== Service pattern ==
Preceding station	Manchester Metrolink	Following station
Proposed
Derker towards East Didsbury	East Didsbury–Rochdale	Shaw and Crompton towards Rochdale Town Centre
