= Milnrow tram stop =

Manchester Metrolink tram stop

Milnrow
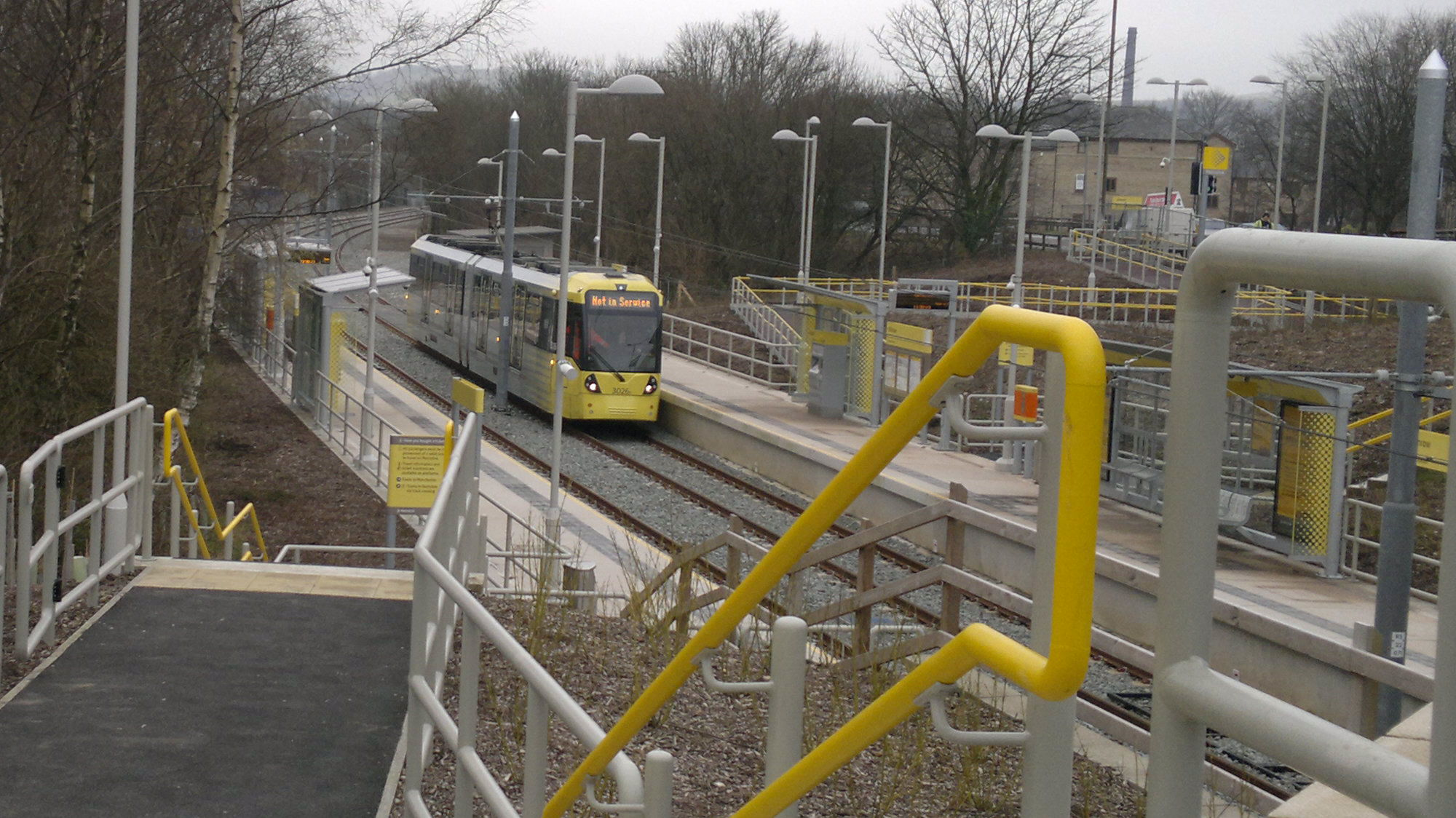
- Milnrow tram stop, in February 2014

General information
- Location: Milnrow, Metropolitan Borough of Rochdale; England
- Coordinates: 53.60811°N 2.11202°W
- Grid reference: SD926123
- System: Metrolink station
- Line: Oldham and Rochdale Line
- Platforms: 2

Other information
- Status: In operation
- Fare zone: 4

History
- Opened: 2 November 1863

Key dates
- 3 October 2009: Closed as a rail station
- 28 February 2013: Conversion to Metrolink operation
Route map
Location

Milnrow is a tram stop on the Oldham and Rochdale Line (ORL) of Greater Manchester's light-rail Metrolink system. It opened to passengers on 28 February 2013 and is located in Milnrow, a part of the Metropolitan Borough of Rochdale, England.

The station sits on the site of Milnrow railway station, a regional rail station which opened on 2 November 1863 and closed on 3 October 2009 for conversion from heavy rail to light rail. It was along the Oldham Loop Line, which operated from Manchester to Rochdale via Oldham and thus was almost identical to the current Metrolink route.

== History ==
At the time the station opened it was as part of a new line from Oldham Mumps to Rochdale East Junction, and created a Middleton Junction to Rochdale route. In 1880 a line was built from Oldham Werneth to Thorpes Bridge Junction near Newton Heath. Subsequently, the whole Thorpes Bridge Junction to Rochdale East Junction route became known as the Oldham Loop Line. The pattern of train services on the Oldham Loop Line involved a greater number of trains serving the Oldham stations, and less services continuing on to Milnrow and Rochdale. In the 1960s and 1970s fewer and fewer trains ran from Oldham Mumps to Rochdale, and in May 1972 the Secretary of State for Transport announced that this part of the Oldham Loop including Milnrow Station would be closed. The closure did not go ahead because what later became the Greater Manchester Passenger Transport Executive (GMPTE) agreed to fund the continuation of services (though the line through the station was subsequently singled between Rochdale & Shaw). The involvement of the GMPTE also lead to a more frequent pattern of trains serving the Oldham Mumps to Rochdale section including Milnrow.

The station closed on 3 October 2009 for the conversion of the line to Metrolink and re-opened as Milnrow tram stop on 28 February 2013. The route was re-doubled as part of the conversion work to allow a more frequent service to operate than before.

== Services ==
Milnrow is located on the Oldham & Rochdale Line with trams towards Manchester city centre and Rochdale railway station. Services are mostly every 12 minutes on all routes.

| Preceding station | Manchester Metrolink | Following station |
|---|---|---|
| Newhey towards East Didsbury | East Didsbury–Rochdale | Kingsway Business Park towards Rochdale Town Centre |
Historical railways
| New Hey | L&YR; Oldham Loop Line | Rochdale |

== Connecting bus routes ==
Milnrow tram stop is served closest by Bee Network services from stops on nearby Dale Street. These include 435/436 (Rochdale to Shaw circulars), 450/451 (Rochdale, Kingsway and Newhey circulars) and 455 (Rochdale to Littleborough)

== Gallery ==
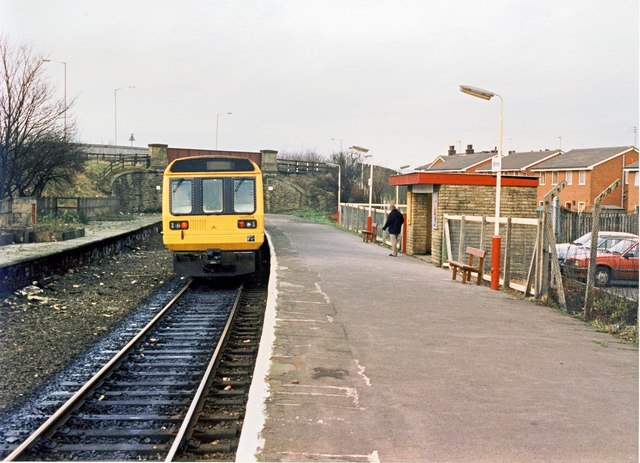
Milnrow railway station in 1989

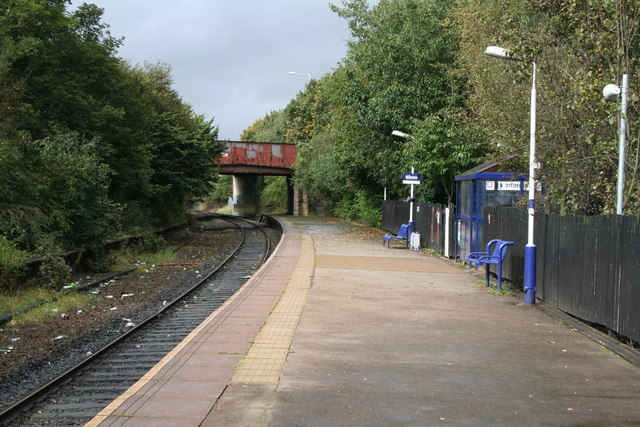
October 2009

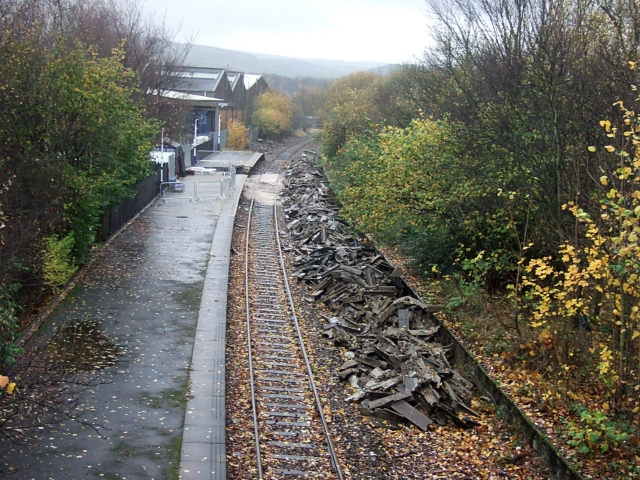
Metrolink conversion November 2009
