= Newbold tram stop =

Manchester Metrolink tram stop

Newbold
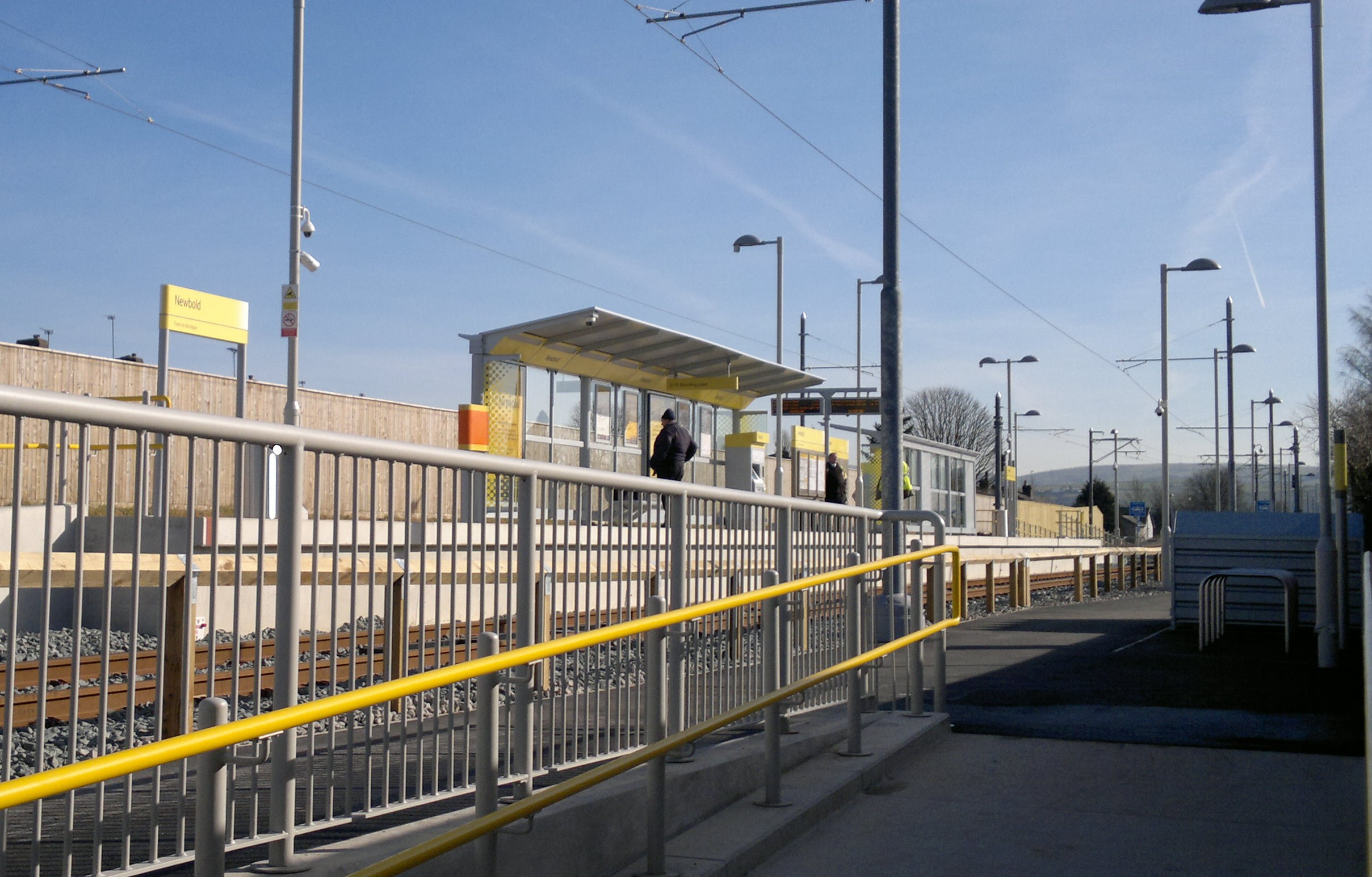
- Newbold tram stop on its opening day

General information
- Location: Newbold, Rochdale; England
- Coordinates: 53.61340°N 2.13550°W
- Grid reference: SD910130
- System: Manchester Metrolink
- Operator: KeolisAmey
- Transit authority: Transport for Greater Manchester
- Line: Oldham and Rochdale Line
- Platforms: 2
- Tram routes

Construction
- Structure type: At-grade
- Accessible: Yes

Other information
- Status: In operation
- Station code: NEB
- Fare zone: 4
- Website: Newbold tram stop

History
- Opened: 28 February 2013; 13 years ago
Route map
Location

Newbold is a Manchester Metrolink tram stop in Newbold, Rochdale. It is on the Oldham-Rochdale Line and in fare zone 2. This stop was opened on 28 February 2013 as part of Phase 3a, and has step-free access.

It is located at street-level and is adjacent to The Kingsway Practice (medical practice). It was also purpose-built for Metrolink on the route of the former Oldham Loop Line: the tram stop itself is not a converted railway station unlike some other tram stops along the Oldham and Rochdale Line.

== History ==
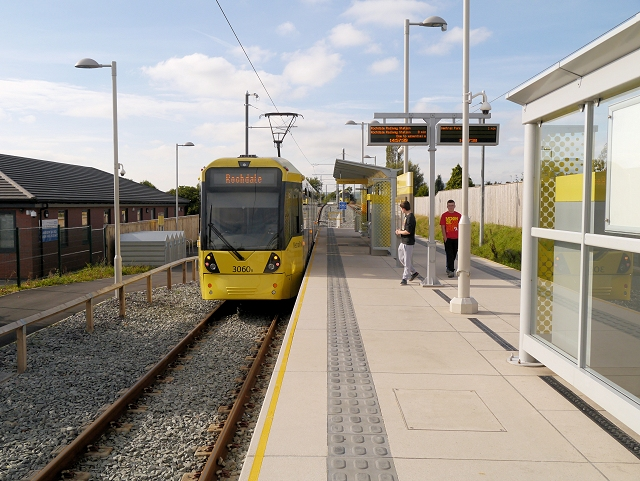
A tram to Rochdale at Newbold tram stop a few months after opening: October 2013

Beginning May 1880, the Oldham Loop railway line operated through this area. The railway line was included in proposals in 1984 for conversion to light rail, and following October 2009, the entire line closed for conversion to Metrolink operation.

A brand new station was planned to be constructed at Newbold, however the railway line was high above street-level at the optimal location, which would have made building a fully accessible tram stop difficult.

The original alignment was modified in early stages during conversion between the Rochdale Bypass (A664) and Milnrow Road (A640) rail bridges so that Newbold stop could be built at street-level instead. This change is made obvious by steep inclines uphill for trams upon leaving Newbold in both directions (at 1:29 Rochdale-bound). A similar change was also done at South Chadderton tram stop further south down the line.

Newbold tram stop opened to passengers on 28 February 2013.

== Layout ==
=== Tram stop ===
Newbold tram stop has two platforms (island), and was constructed with accessibility in mind. There are two entrances to the station via pedestrian track crossings. A new footpath was paved for the Metrolink from the Rochdale Bypass (A664) road to the tram stop.

Two dot matrix passenger information displays stand on one platform each, showing estimated arrival times for trams in minutes up to 30 minutes prior (up to three at a time) and number of carriages.

=== Track layout ===
The Oldham Loop line was singled between Shaw & Crompton and Rochdale in 1980, meaning the line here was also singled. The railway bridge over Milnrow Road (A640) was reduced from a double-track to a single-track bridge. When the Metrolink arrived, the track also had to single here. The singled section starts just west of Newbold. It runs for 1,040 m (1,140 yd) until High Level Road next to Rochdale railway station, and it is the longest singled section on the entire Metrolink.

Along this single track section is a flyover built over the existing Calder Valley railway line for the trams. The Metrolink tracks were raised up and moved away from the former Oldham Loop alignment for this, and rarely-used track from the Oldham Loop can be spotted at the bottom of the embankment made for the Metrolink. The flyover bridge was lifted into place between 1-3 January 2011.

== Services ==
Every route across the Manchester Metrolink network operates to a 12-minute headway (5 tph) Monday–Saturday, and to a 15-minute headway (4 tph) on Sundays and bank holidays. Sections served by a second "peak only" route (like this stop) will have a combined headway of 6 minutes during peak times.

Newbold is located in Zone 4, and the stop itself has two platforms (island) which aren't named. Trams towards Manchester heading to East Didsbury via Exchange Square depart from the inbound platform (north), and trams to Rochdale Town Centre stop at the outbound platform (south).

Preceding station	Manchester Metrolink	Following station
Kingsway Business Park towards East Didsbury	East Didsbury–Rochdale	Rochdale Railway Station towards Rochdale Town Centre

== Transport connections ==
=== Bus ===
Newbold tram stop is served closest by Bee Network bus route 434 (Middleton–Rochdale) and two Bee Network school bus services on Rochdale Bypass (A664). On nearby Milnrow Road, there are services 450/451 (Rochdale, Newhey and Kingsway circular), 435/436 (Rochdale to Shaw circular) and 455 to Milnrow and Littleborough.

=== Train ===
This tram stop is not connected to or near to any railway stations, but the nearest is Rochdale (which can be reached by tram), about 1 mile (1.6 km) away walking.
