= Derker tram stop =

Manchester Metrolink tram stop

Derker
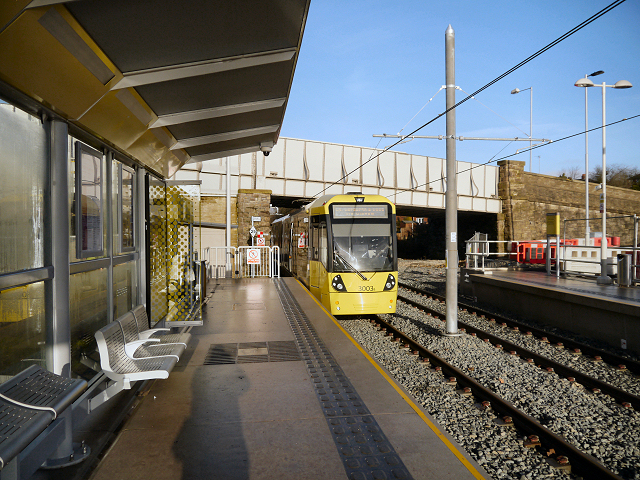
- Derker tram stop, on its opening day

General information
- Location: Derker, Oldham; England
- Coordinates: 53.54972°N 2.10159°W
- Grid reference: SD933058
- System: Metrolink station
- Line: Oldham and Rochdale Line
- Platforms: 2

Other information
- Status: In operation
- Fare zone: 3/4

History
- Opened: 1985
- Original company: British Rail

Key dates
- 3 October 2009: Closed as a rail station
- 16 December 2012: Conversion to Metrolink operation
Route map
Location

Derker is a stop on the Oldham and Rochdale Line (ORL) of Greater Manchester's light-rail Metrolink system. It opened to passengers on 16 December 2012 and is located in the Derker area of Oldham, England.

== History ==
Derker railway station was opened, initially on an experimental basis, on 30 August 1985 by British Rail to replace Royton Junction station, ½ mile further along the line.

The station closed on 3 October 2009, was converted to light rail, and re-opened as Derker Metrolink station on 16 December 2012. The station is served by a 254 space Park and Ride car park, which is immediately adjacent to the station and is accessed from Cromford Street.

== Service pattern ==
| Preceding station | Manchester Metrolink | Following station |
|---|---|---|
| Oldham Mumps towards East Didsbury | East Didsbury–Rochdale | Shaw and Crompton towards Rochdale Town Centre |
| Oldham Mumps towards East Didsbury | East Didsbury–Shaw (peak only) | Shaw and Crompton Terminus |
Proposed
| Oldham Mumps towards East Didsbury | East Didsbury–Rochdale | Cop Road towards Rochdale Town Centre |
| Oldham Mumps towards East Didsbury | East Didsbury–Shaw (peak only) | Cop Road towards Shaw and Crompton |
Historical railways
| Oldham Mumps | Regional Railways; Oldham Loop Line | Royton Junction |
