= Westwood tram stop =

Manchester Metrolink tram stop

Westwood
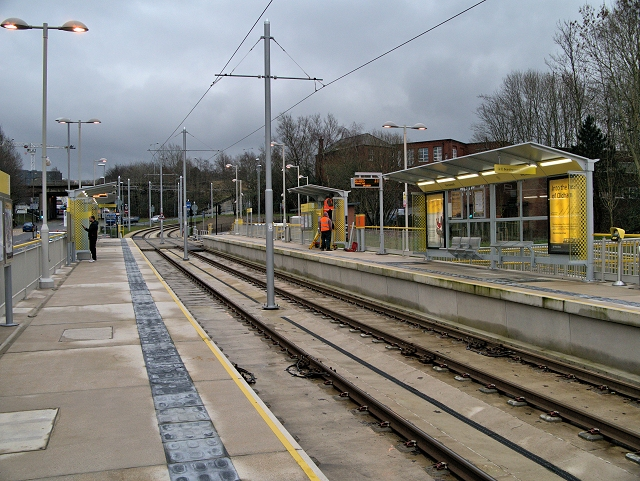
- Westwood tram stop

General information
- Location: Oldham, Oldham; England
- Coordinates: 53.54236°N 2.12581°W
- System: Metrolink station
- Line: Oldham and Rochdale Line
- Platforms: 2

Other information
- Status: In operation
- Fare zone: 3

History
- Opened: 27 January 2014
- Original company: Manchester Metrolink
Route map
Location

Westwood is a tram stop on the Oldham and Rochdale Line (ORL) of the Manchester Metrolink and serves the Westwood area of Oldham, in Greater Manchester, England. The stop opened on 27 January 2014.

The tram stop is a 15-minute walk away from Oldham Athletic Football Club.

== Service pattern ==
Preceding station	Manchester Metrolink	Following station
Freehold towards East Didsbury	East Didsbury–Rochdale	Oldham King Street towards Rochdale Town Centre
Freehold towards East Didsbury	East Didsbury–Shaw (peak only)	Oldham King Street towards Shaw and Crompton
