= Newhey tram stop =

Manchester Metrolink tram stop

Newhey
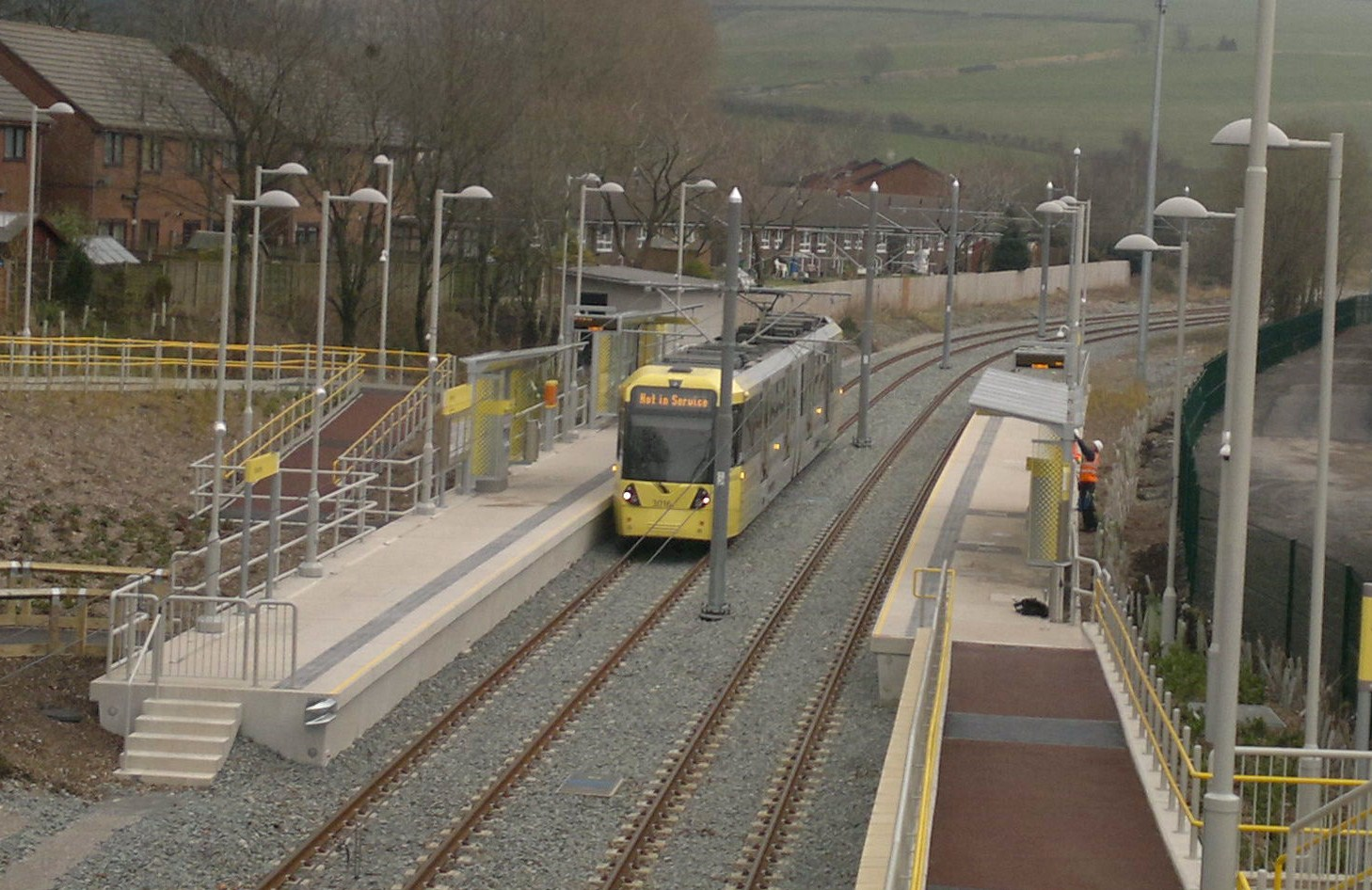
- Newhey tram stop, in February 2013

General information
- Location: Newhey, Rochdale; England
- Coordinates: 53.60083°N 2.09465°W
- System: Metrolink station
- Line: Oldham and Rochdale Line
- Platforms: 2

Other information
- Status: In operation
- Fare zone: 4

History
- Opened: 2 November 1863 as New Hey railway station
- Former names: New Hey

Key dates
- 2009: Closed for Metrolink conversion
- 28 February 2013: Opened as Newhey tram stop
Route map
Location

Newhey is a tram stop on the Oldham and Rochdale Line (ORL) of Greater Manchester's light-rail Metrolink system. It opened to passengers on 28 February 2013 and is located in Newhey, a suburban village the Metropolitan Borough of Rochdale, England.

The stop sits on the site of New Hey railway station, a regional rail station which opened on 2 November 1863 and closed on 3 October 2009 for conversion from heavy rail to light rail. It was along the Oldham Loop Line, which operated from Manchester to Rochdale via Oldham and thus was almost identical to the current Metrolink route.

== History ==
The station was situated on the Manchester to Rochdale via Oldham route which connected the city of Manchester to the town of Rochdale via Oldham and a number of smaller districts and suburbs including Newhey. At the time the station opened it was as part of a new line from Oldham Mumps to Rochdale East Junction, and created a Middleton Junction to Rochdale route. In 1880 a line was built from Oldham Werneth to Thorpes Bridge Junction near Newton Heath. Subsequently, the whole Thorpes Bridge Junction to Rochdale East Junction route became known as the Oldham Loop Line. The pattern of train services on the Oldham Loop Line involved a greater number of trains serving the Oldham stations, and less services continuing on to New Hey and Rochdale. In the 1960s and 1970s fewer and fewer trains ran from Oldham Mumps to Rochdale, and in May 1972 the Secretary of State for Transport announced that this part of the Oldham Loop including New Hey Station would be closed. The closure did not go ahead because what later became the Greater Manchester Passenger Transport Executive (GMPTE) agreed to fund the continuation of services. The involvement of the GMPTE also lead to a more frequent pattern of trains serving the Oldham Mumps to Rochdale section including New Hey, though the Rochdale to Shaw portion was reduced to single track to reduce maintenance costs (leaving only one platform in use).

The station closed on 3 October 2009 for the conversion of the line to Metrolink and re-opened as Newhey Metrolink station, with the modern spelling of the village's name, from 28 February 2013. The route was re-doubled during conversion to allow a more frequent service to operate and thus the rebuilt station has two platforms.

== Services ==
Newhey is located on the Oldham & Rochdale Line with trams towards Manchester city centre and Rochdale running every 12 minutes throughout the day Mondays to Sundays.

| Preceding station | Manchester Metrolink | Following station |
|---|---|---|
| Shaw and Crompton towards East Didsbury | East Didsbury–Rochdale | Milnrow towards Rochdale Town Centre |
Historical railways
| Shaw and Crompton | L&YR; Oldham Loop Line | Milnrow |

== Connecting bus routes ==
Newhey tram stop is served by Bee Network services 450/451 (Rochdale, Newhey and Kingsway circular) on Huddersfield Road, and by services 435/436 (Rochdale to Shaw circular) on nearby Milnrow Road.

== Gallery ==
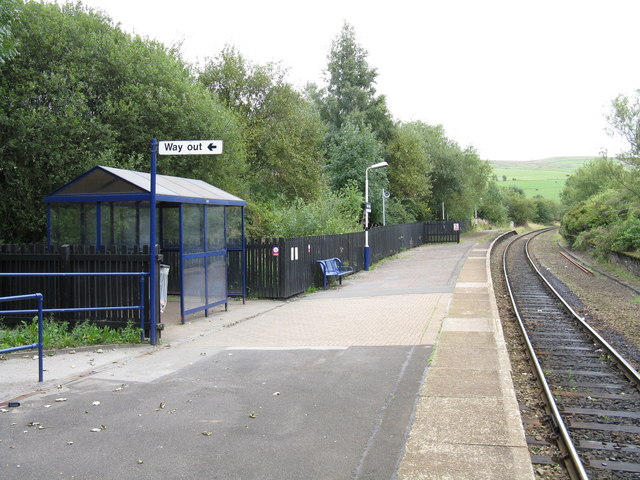
September 2009

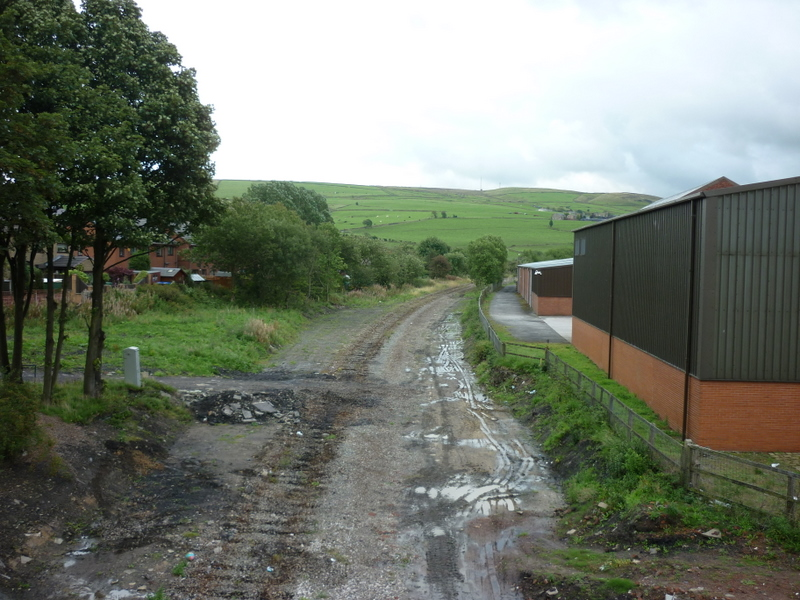
Conversion to Metrolink, September 2010
