= Oldham Mumps tram stop =

Manchester Metrolink tram stop

Oldham Mumps
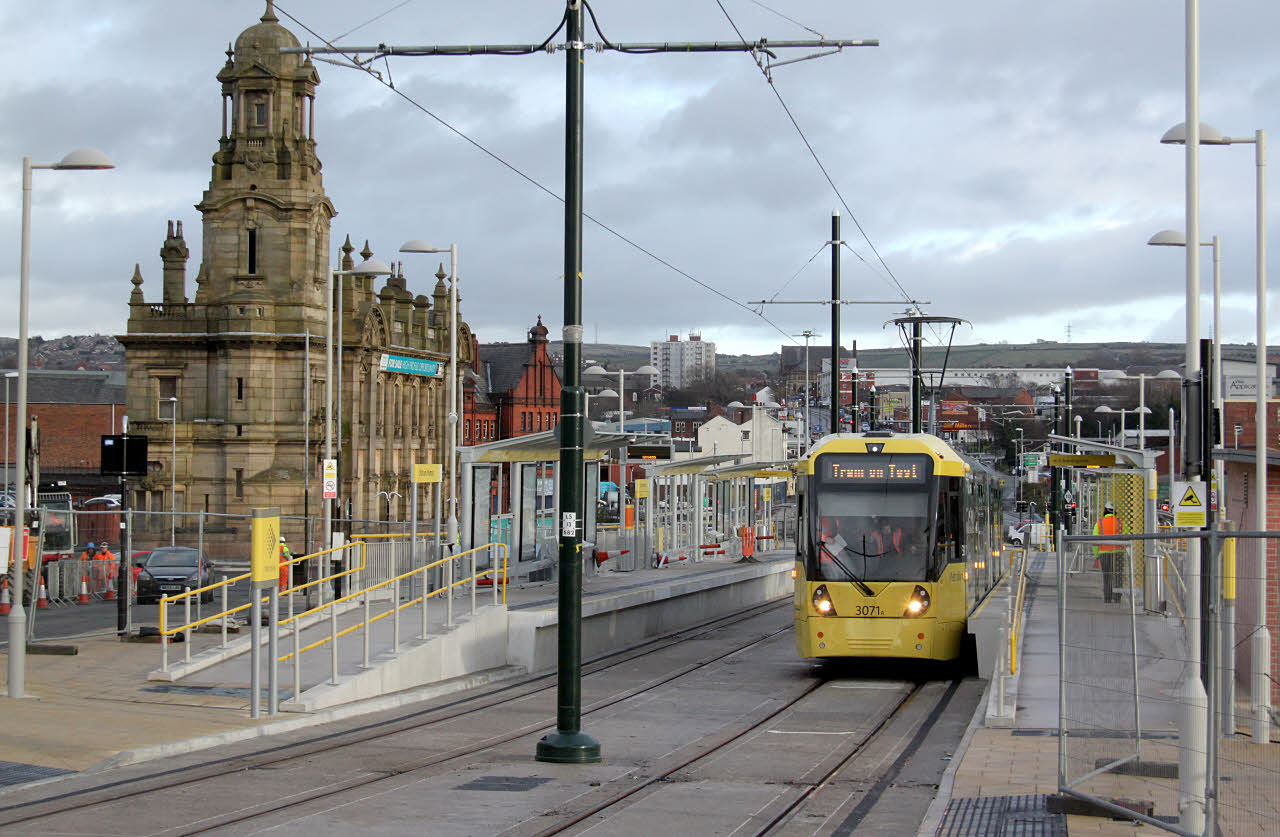
- A tram at Oldham Mumps

General information
- Location: Oldham, Metropolitan Borough of Oldham, England
- Coordinates: 53.54241°N 2.10342°W
- Grid reference: SD933049
- System: Metrolink station
- Line: Oldham and Rochdale Line
- Platforms: 2

Other information
- Status: In operation
- Fare zone: 3

Key dates
- 13 June 2012 (temporary station) 27 January 2014 (opening date of permanent station): Conversion to Metrolink operation
Route map
Location

Oldham Mumps is a tram stop in the Mumps area of Oldham, in Greater Manchester, England. It lies on the Oldham and Rochdale Line of the Manchester Metrolink light rail system, which opened in 2014.

A temporary stop of the same name opened to passengers on 13 June 2012, as part of Phase 3a of the system's expansion. Phase 3b resulted in the stop's decommissioning in 2014 and its replacement with the permanent stop at the opposite end of Mumps on a realigned track. The temporary stop was on the site of the original Oldham Mumps heavy rail station which opened (Note: Initially for haulage.) on 1 November 1847 and closed on 3 October 2009 for conversion to light rail operation. It was a stop on the Oldham Loop Line, which operated from Manchester Victoria to Rochdale, via Oldham; the route was almost identical to the current Metrolink route.

== History ==
=== Railway station ===
Oldham Mumps railway station opened on 1 November 1847, as a station on the Oldham Loop Line, 7 1/2 mi (12.1 km) north-east of Manchester Victoria, operated and managed by Northern Rail.

The name of the station is taken from its situation within the Mumps area of Oldham, which itself probably derived from the archaic word "mumper", slang for a beggar.

The station was reached across the dual-carriageway Oldham by-pass, a difficult walk from the town centre. A pedestrian underpass led to the island platform, where there was a ticket office.

The station closed due to the conversion of the line to Manchester Metrolink on 3 October 2009 and, by May 2010, had been completely demolished. The station canopy has been saved; it was bought by the East Lancashire Railway after a successful public fund-raising campaign. It is hoped that the canopy will be installed at Bury Bolton Street.

=== Temporary tram stop ===
In June 2010, the Greater Manchester Passenger Transport Executive (GMPTE) announced that as part of the conversion of the former Oldham loop, it would submit a planning application for a temporary Metrolink terminus at Oldham Mumps, close to the site of the former station. Services to the temporary terminus commenced on 13 June 2012.

The temporary Metrolink stop was reached by crossing Oldham Way or could be accessed by the free Metroshuttle service, which linked the station with the town centre and bus station. The temporary stop was closed on 18 January 2014.

=== Permanent tram stop ===
The permanent Metrolink station opened on 27 January 2014 on the site of the former B&Q store and is also a bus interchange.

== Service pattern ==
Preceding station	Manchester Metrolink	Following station
Oldham Central towards East Didsbury	East Didsbury–Rochdale	Derker towards Rochdale Town Centre
Oldham Central towards East Didsbury	East Didsbury–Shaw (peak only)	Derker towards Shaw and Crompton
