= Oldham King Street tram stop =

Manchester Metrolink tram stop

Oldham King Street
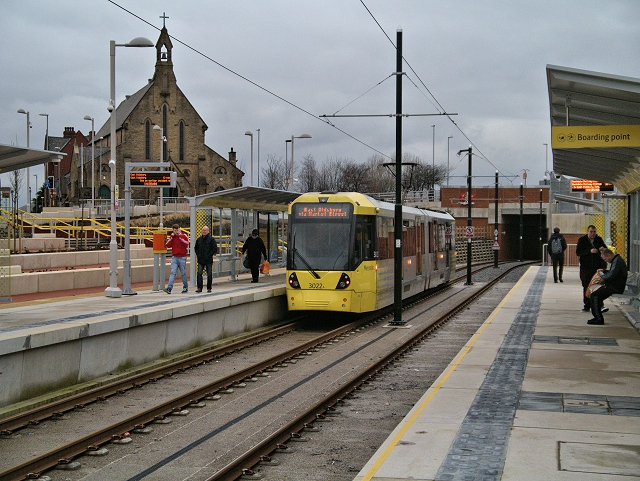
- A tram at Oldham King Street tram stop in January 2014

General information
- Location: Oldham, Oldham; England
- Coordinates: 53.53958°N 2.11747°W
- Grid reference: SD923048
- System: Metrolink station
- Line: Oldham and Rochdale Line
- Platforms: 2

Other information
- Status: In operation
- Fare zone: 3

History
- Opened: 27 January 2014
- Original company: Manchester Metrolink
Route map
Location

Oldham King Street is a tram stop on the Oldham and Rochdale Line (ORL) of Greater Manchester's light-rail Metrolink system and is located opposite Oldham Sixth Form College, at the junction of King Street and Union Street in Oldham, England. The stop opened on 27 January 2014. It is built on the site of the former King Street Baptist Church, which occupied the site from 1862 to 2005. The site was acquired by Compulsory Purchase Order in 2005, and the Church was rebuilt nearby in Chaucer Street with the compensation it received. A plaque, acknowledging this, on a stone pillar from the original church stands on the corner of the site.

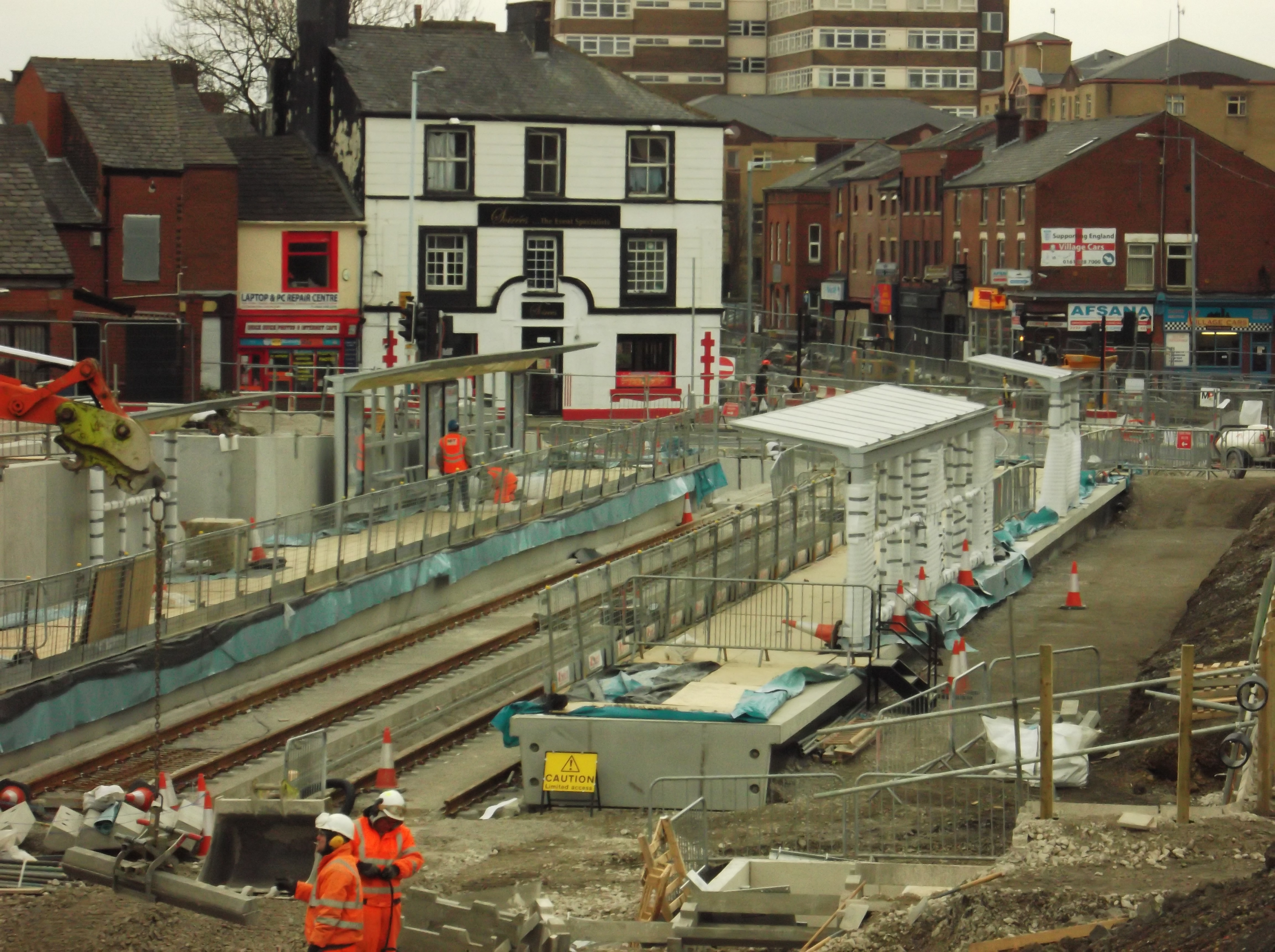
Oldham King Street Metrolink station, under construction in February 2013

== Service pattern ==
Preceding station	Manchester Metrolink	Following station
Westwood towards East Didsbury	East Didsbury–Rochdale	Oldham Central towards Rochdale Town Centre
Westwood towards East Didsbury	East Didsbury–Shaw (peak only)	Oldham Central towards Shaw and Crompton
