= Oldham Central tram stop =

Manchester Metrolink tram stop

Oldham Central
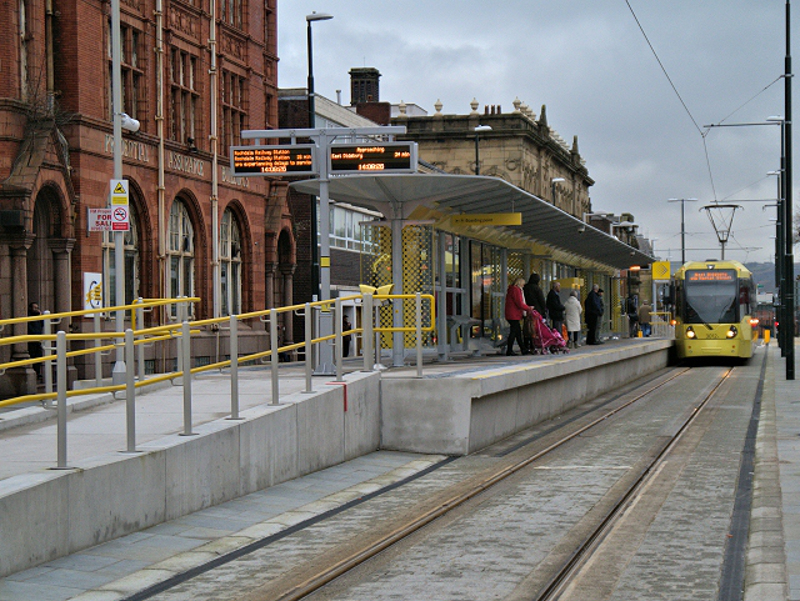
- A tram at Oldham Central

General information
- Location: Oldham, Metropolitan Borough of Oldham; England
- Coordinates: 53.54032°N 2.11213°W
- System: Metrolink station
- Line: Oldham and Rochdale Line
- Platforms: 2

Other information
- Status: In operation
- Fare zone: 3

History
- Opened: 27 January 2014
- Original company: Manchester Metrolink
Route map
Location

Oldham Central tram stop is a tram stop in Oldham town centre on Union Street. It is on the Oldham and Rochdale Line (ORL) The stop takes its name from the closed Oldham Central railway station, which was located south of Oldham Way.

The stop was built as part of Phase 3b of the Manchester Metrolink and opened on 27 January 2014.

== Service pattern ==
Preceding station	Manchester Metrolink	Following station
Oldham King Street towards East Didsbury	East Didsbury–Rochdale	Oldham Mumps towards Rochdale Town Centre
Oldham King Street towards East Didsbury	East Didsbury–Shaw (peak only)	Oldham Mumps towards Shaw and Crompton
