= Oldham and Rochdale Line =

Manchester Metrolink line

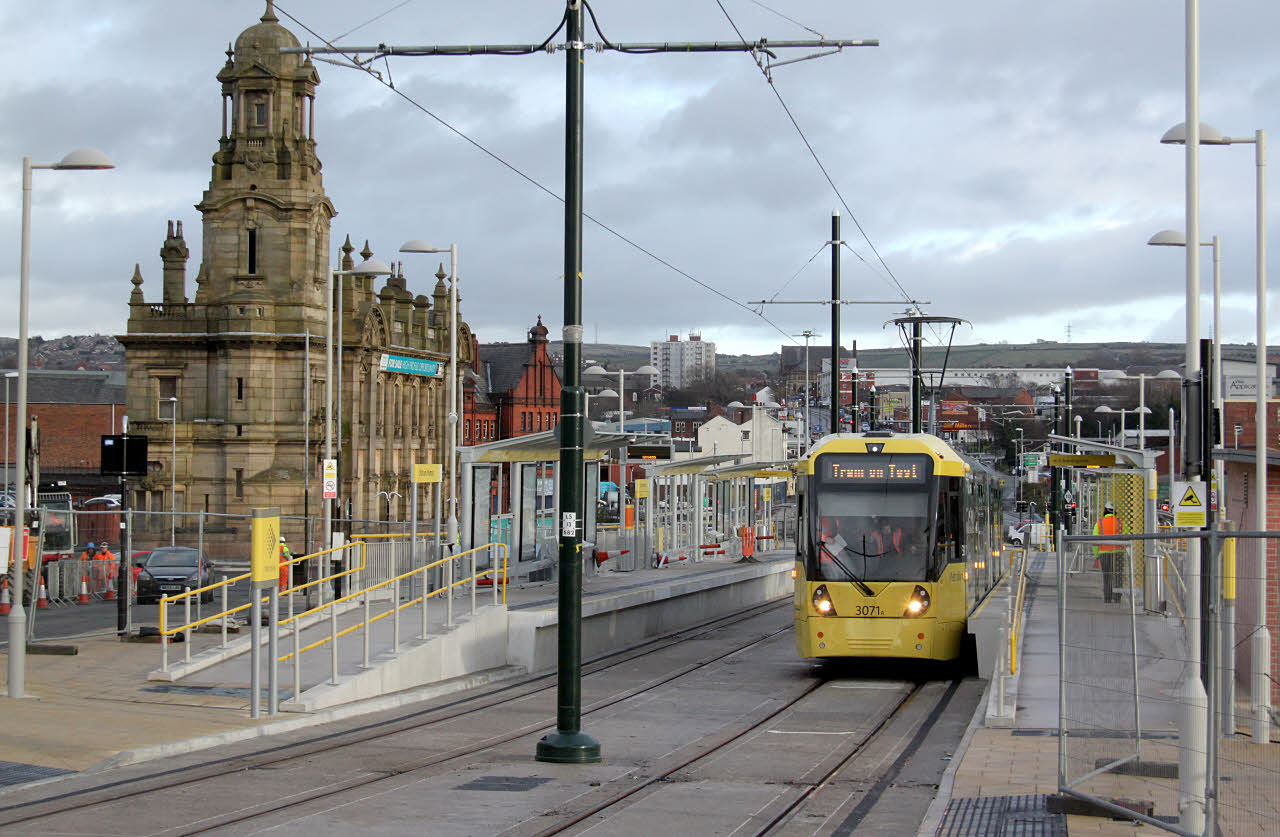
- A M5000 tram at Oldham Mumps tram stop.

Overview
- Locale: Manchester, Chadderton, Oldham , Rochdale
- Termini: Manchester Victoria; Rochdale Town Centre
- Stations: 19

Service
- Type: Tram/Light rail
- System: Manchester Metrolink
- Rolling stock: M5000

History
- Opened: 13 June 2012 (Victoria to Oldham Mumps); 16 December 2012 (Oldham Mumps to Shaw & Crompton); 28 February 2013 (Shaw & Crompton to Rochdale railway station); 27 January 2014 (Oldham town centre line); 31 March 2014 (Rochdale railway station to Rochdale Town Centre)

Technical
- Track length: 23.5 km (14.6 mi)
- Character: Converted railway line with street running sections.
- Track gauge: 1,435 mm (4 ft 8 1/2 in) standard gauge
- Electrification: 750 volts DC overhead
- Operating speed: 50 mph (80km/h)

The Oldham and Rochdale Line (ORL) is a light rail/tram line on the Manchester Metrolink in Greater Manchester, running from North Manchester to Rochdale town centre via Oldham, reusing most of the trackbed of the former Oldham Loop railway line which closed in 2009. The line was re-opened in a modified form as a tramway from 2012 – 2014, as part of Phase 3 of the Metrolink's expansion.

== Route ==
The line runs north-east to Oldham before turning north to Shaw and then north-west to Rochdale. The line mostly follows the trackbed of the former heavy rail Oldham Loop Line. However, it leaves the trackbed to run on the streets through Oldham town centre. There is also a street-running section in Rochdale town centre.

The line begins at Irk Valley Junction, where it diverges from the Bury Line to the east, following the former Cheetham Hill loop line. Near the junction with the Bury Line, a link runs into Queens Road tram depot. The line then serves stops at Monsall and Central Park before crossing over the Calder Valley Line on a tram viaduct.

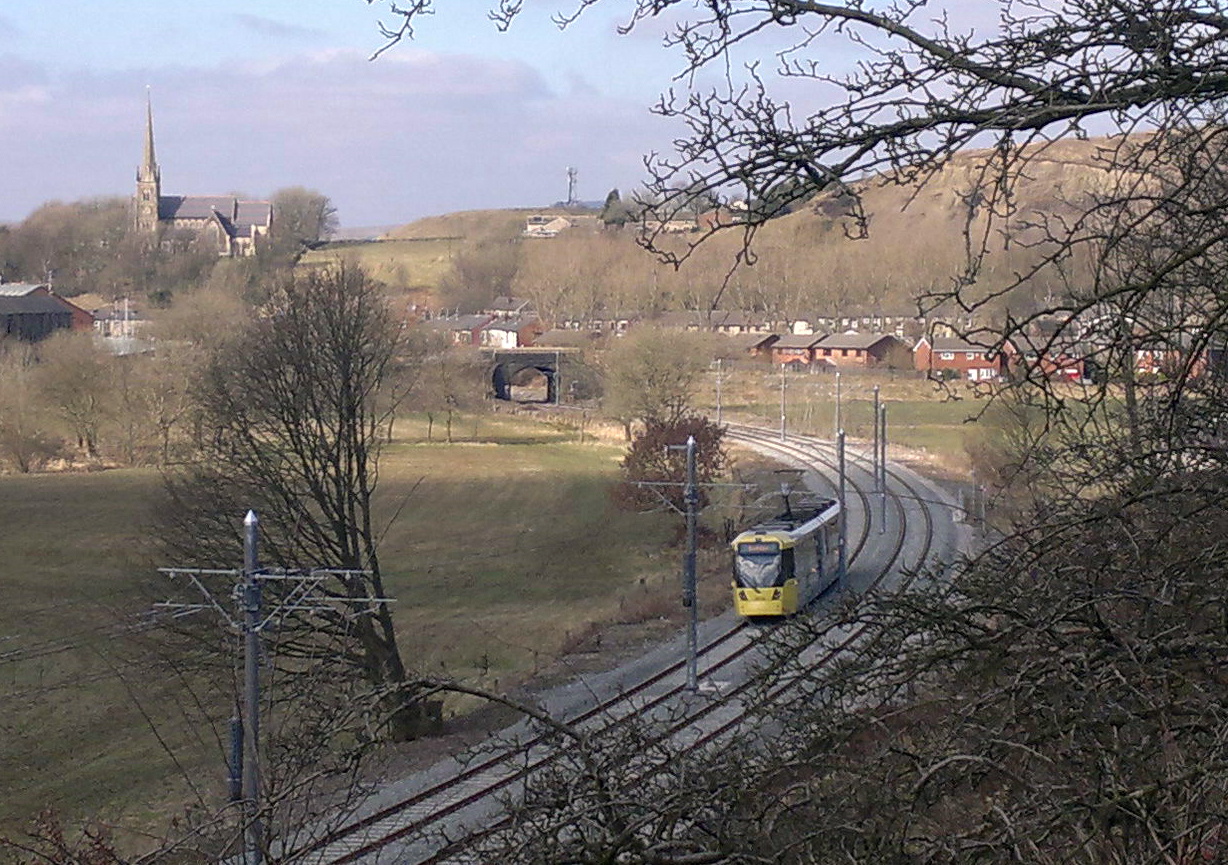
A tram running on the line between Shaw and Crompton, and Newhey.

After passing over the viaduct, the line then re-joins the former railway trackbed. After a few hundred metres, the tracks merge into a single track. The adjacent track is used by freight trains to the Greater Manchester Waste Disposal Depot. Double track running resumes just beyond Newton Heath and Moston stop, and the line continues north-east along the former railway trackbed, serving stops at Failsworth, Hollinwood (both converted railway stations), South Chadderton, and Freehold (both brand new tram stops).

Beyond Freehold tram stop, close to the edge of Oldham town centre, the line diverges from the former railway trackbed at a sharp left turn, and onto a mostly street running line through the town centre, serving stops at Westwood, Oldham King Street, Oldham Central and Oldham Mumps.

The line then rejoins the former railway trackbed near the eastern edge of the town centre, and runs north, serving stops at Derker and Shaw and Crompton, then turns to the north-west serving Newhey, Milnrow (both converted railway stations), Kingsway Business Park and Newbold (both new tram stops). The tram line merges into a single track again just west of Newbold. Rather than running directly into Rochdale station as the former railway did, the tram line now passes over the Calder Valley Line on a bridge and runs alongside the main line railway into Rochdale. It then merges onto the street and to a new tram stop outside the railway station. It then continues on the streets to the line's terminus at Rochdale Town Centre.

=== Route map ===
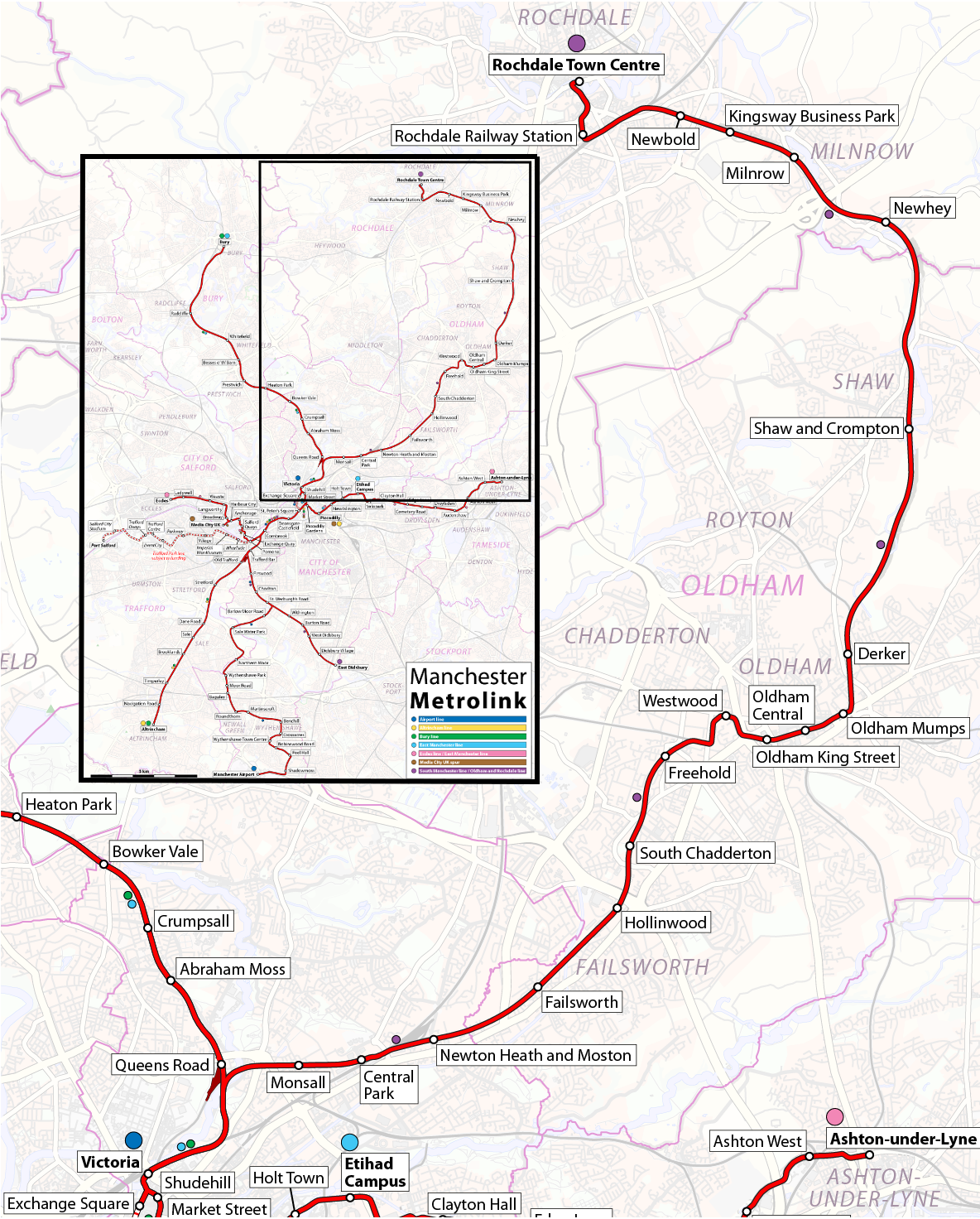

== History ==
=== Pre-Metrolink ===
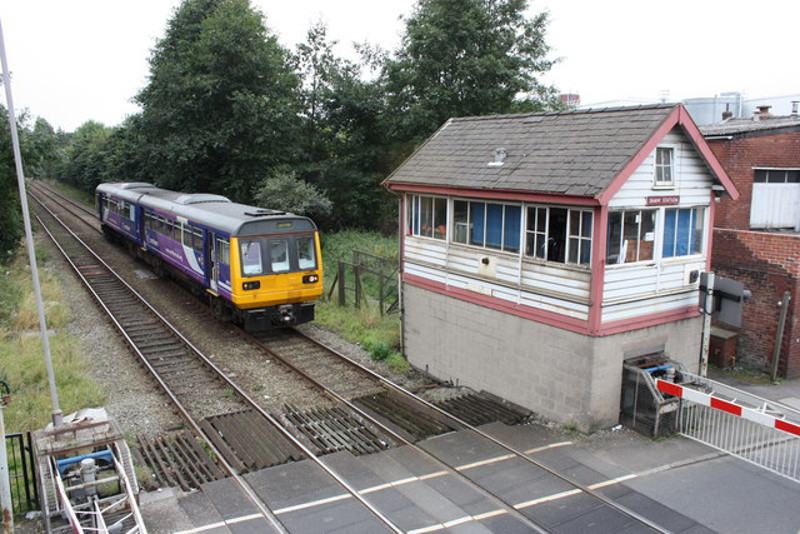
The Oldham Loop Line in 2009, shortly before closure and conversion to Metrolink; a Class 142 approaches Shaw and Crompton.

The route was originally a railway, the Oldham Loop Line, which was built in stages: The first railway to reach Oldham was a branch line which opened in March 1842, constructed by the Manchester and Leeds Railway (M&LR). This line ran from Middleton Junction, from the Manchester to Leeds line which had opened the previous year, to Oldham Werneth railway station: Oldham Werneth was located inconveniently from the town centre in the lower part of Oldham, so in 1847, the line was extended one mile to Oldham Mumps railway station. By this time the Manchester and Leeds Railway had become part of the Lancashire and Yorkshire Railway (LYR).

In August 1863, a six-mile (10 km) extension was opened from Oldham Mumps to Rochdale, also connecting to the Manchester-Leeds line, effectively creating a loop from Middleton to Rochdale.

The line between Middleton Junction and Oldham was steeply inclined and therefore difficult to work; until 1854 the line had been cable-worked. In 1873, the LYR obtained an act to build a more direct, and less steeply inclined line between Oldham and Manchester, running via Failsworth, and joining the Manchester-Leeds line at Thorpes Bridge Junction. This line was opened in May 1880, therefore completing what became known as the Oldham Loop Line. The original line from Middleton Junction to Oldham closed in 1964.

Unlike the Bury and Altrincham Lines, the Oldham line was never electrified, and was operated by steam and then, from 1958, by diesels.

=== Conversion to Metrolink ===
The Oldham Loop Line was identified by transport planners in the 1980s, as one of the local railway lines in the Greater Manchester area, which was used mostly for local traffic, and could therefore be split off from the main line network and converted to light-rail operation. The network was however to be built in stages, and the Oldham line was not included in the first phase of the Metrolink in the early 1990s due to cost reasons, the Bury Line and Altrincham Line being chosen for conversion instead.

The line was however included in the third phase of the system's development, which also included new lines to Ashton-under-Lyne, East Didsbury and Manchester Airport.

Several new features were to be included as part of the conversion:

- In order to better serve Oldham town centre, a new street running line was to be constructed, with four new stops at Westwood, Oldham King Street, Oldham Central and Oldham Mumps. This would allow a 1.5 mile (2.4 km) section of the old railway through the former Oldham Mumps railway station to be abandoned.
- In order to better serve Rochdale town centre, a short street-running line was to be constructed from Rochdale Railway Station to Rochdale Town Centre.
- In addition to these, several entirely new stops were to be added on the former railway sections at South Chadderton, Freehold, Kingsway Business Park and Newbold.

The final day of railway operations was 3 October 2009, and the Oldham Loop Line was closed for conversion. The line was completely rebuilt, with all of the former infrastructure, including the former stations and station buildings demolished, and replaced, and overhead wiring added.

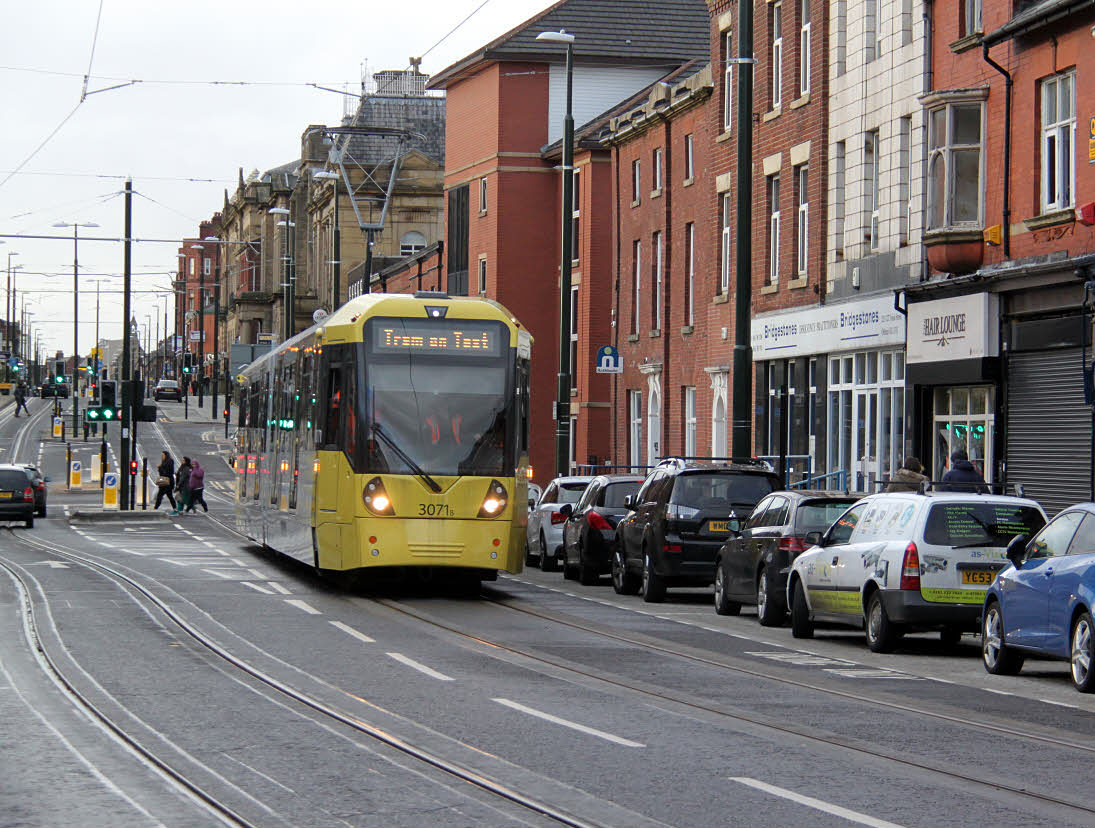
A M5000 tram running through Union Street, on the Oldham town centre line opened in January 2014.

The line was re-opened in phases: Tram services started on 13 June 2012 between Victoria and Oldham Mumps: As a temporary measure, until the town centre line was completed, the former railway line bordering Oldham town centre was retained, and a single temporary tram stop constructed close to the site of the former Oldham Mumps railway station (a permanent stop with the same name was later opened on the Oldham town centre section in a different location). Services were extended to Shaw and Crompton on 16 December 2012, and to Rochdale Railway Station on 28 February 2013. The Oldham town centre line opened on 27 January 2014, allowing the section of former railway line, and temporary stop at Oldham Mumps to be permanently closed. The Rochdale town centre line to Rochdale Interchange opened on 31 March 2014.

== Proposed future development ==
In January 2016, Jim McMahon, MP for Oldham West and Royton, proposed two loop extensions to the metrolink system around Oldham. The link would add a spur from Westwood tram stop to Middleton town centre, before joining the Bury Line near Bowker Vale, in line with the proposed Middleton extension.

The Ashton Loop would extend the line beyond Ashton town centre to Oldham Mumps. Both would connect Rochdale to its neighbouring towns without the need to travel in and out of Manchester city centre. Initial high level feasibility work was undertaken by officials at Transport for Greater Manchester which demonstrated the route is technically possible.

== Services ==
=== Full route ===
On this line, full route run from East Didsbury – Rochdale Town Centre during all Metrolink operational times.

=== Part-time route ===
Short workings from East Didsbury – Shaw and Crompton during peak times only.
