= Rochdale railway station =

Railway station and tram stop in Greater Manchester, England

Coordinates: 53.610°N 2.1541°W

Rochdale
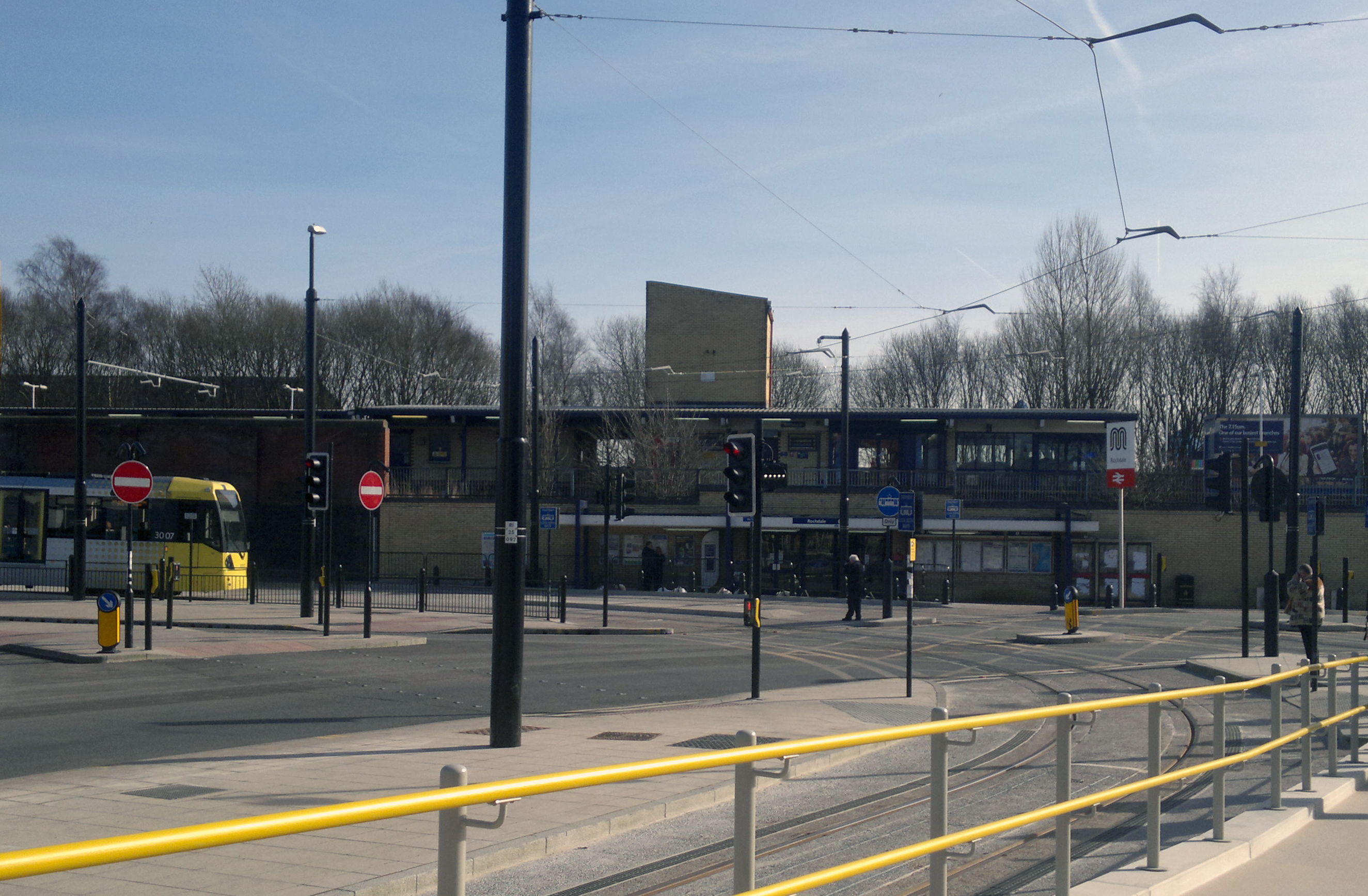
- The station in 2013

General information
- Location: Rochdale, Metropolitan Borough of Rochdale, England
- Grid reference: SD899126
- Manager: Northern Trains
- Platforms: 4

Other information
- Station code: RCD
- Classification: DfT category C2

Key dates
- 1839: Original station opened
- 1889: Current station opened
- 1979: Reduced to 3 platforms
- 2016: Increased to 4 platforms

Passengers
- 2020/21: ▼0.392 million
- Interchange: ▼10,335
- 2021/22: ▲1.157 million
- Interchange: ▲38,027
- 2022/23: ▲1.348 million
- Interchange: ▲51,545
- 2023/24: ▲1.493 million
- Interchange: ▲68,445
- 2024/25: ▲1.630 million
- Interchange: ▲74,104
Location
Notes
- Passenger statistics from the Office of Rail and Road

Rochdale railway station is a multi-modal transport hub in the town of Rochdale, in Greater Manchester, England. It consists of a Northern Trains-operated heavy rail station on the Calder Vale Line and an adjoining light rail stop on Manchester Metrolink's Pink line. The original heavy-rail element of the station was opened by the Manchester and Leeds Railway in 1839, 0.5 miles (0.8 km) to the south of the town centre; the Metrolink element opened in February 2013. Further improvements to the station were delivered as part of the Northern Hub railway enhancement scheme.

== History ==
=== Heavy rail ===
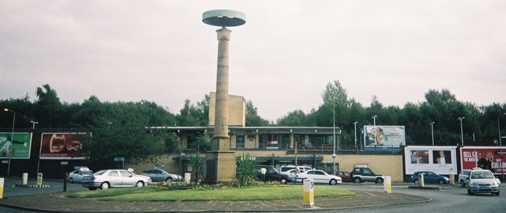
Frontage of the station (2007)

The town's first station, which opened in 1839, was adjacent to Moss Lane and located around 300 yards (270 m) east of the present site. The single storey structure was replaced by the current depot in April 1889, being too small to handle the increasing traffic levels on the Lancashire and Yorkshire Railway's main line between Leeds & Manchester and the associated branch lines to Bury Bolton Street (1848), Oldham Central (1863) and Bacup (1881) that had been opened subsequently.

The present station previously served lines to Bolton via Bury, which was closed in October 1970, and Bacup in June 1947, as well as the extant lines. It had eight platforms: four through platforms and four bays; there were two entrances: one on Maclure Road and another on Miall Street. In 1979, the station was reduced to three platforms, with the closure and abandonment of the eastern island platform and its bays; the Miall Street entrance was closed. Passengers thereafter had to walk through a subway from the Maclure Road entrance and climb stairs to the main concourse, which includes a ticket office and snack bar.

In 1987, during a brief experimental period overseen by the North Western Region of British Rail, the disused eastern island platform was reopened temporarily as a dedicated heritage siding to stable preserved LMS Black Five steam locomotive no. 45407 The Lancashire Fusilier. This was during its main line certification trials, complete with a commemorative plaque unveiled by the town's mayor on 12 September; the siding was decommissioned the following spring after funding lapsed.

Currently, only the two through platforms are used regularly; the former Oldham bay platform is still available, but is normally only for stabling empty stock or turning back late-running trains from the Todmorden direction. Terminating trains from Manchester and beyond use the stub of the former Oldham branch, which has been converted into a turnback siding, to reverse clear of the main line. Signalling at the station has also been modernised, with colour lights controlled from Rochdale West signal box replacing the semaphores previously in use. The old signal box at Rochdale had to be demolished in 2011, as it stood in the alignment of the planned Metrolink flyover.

In 2015, construction on a fourth railway platform began. The 148 yd (135 m) bay platform was completed in 2016 and is used to relieve congestion at Manchester Victoria, where terminating trains would otherwise occupy the through platforms; numerous services now continue on to Rochdale as opposed to terminating at Victoria. It is located at the south end of the main island platform, with the southbound through line having been re-aligned slightly further east to accommodate the new terminating line and is used by the half-hourly stopping service from Blackburn/Clitheroe via Bolton and Victoria.

=== Light rail ===
Rochdale railway station
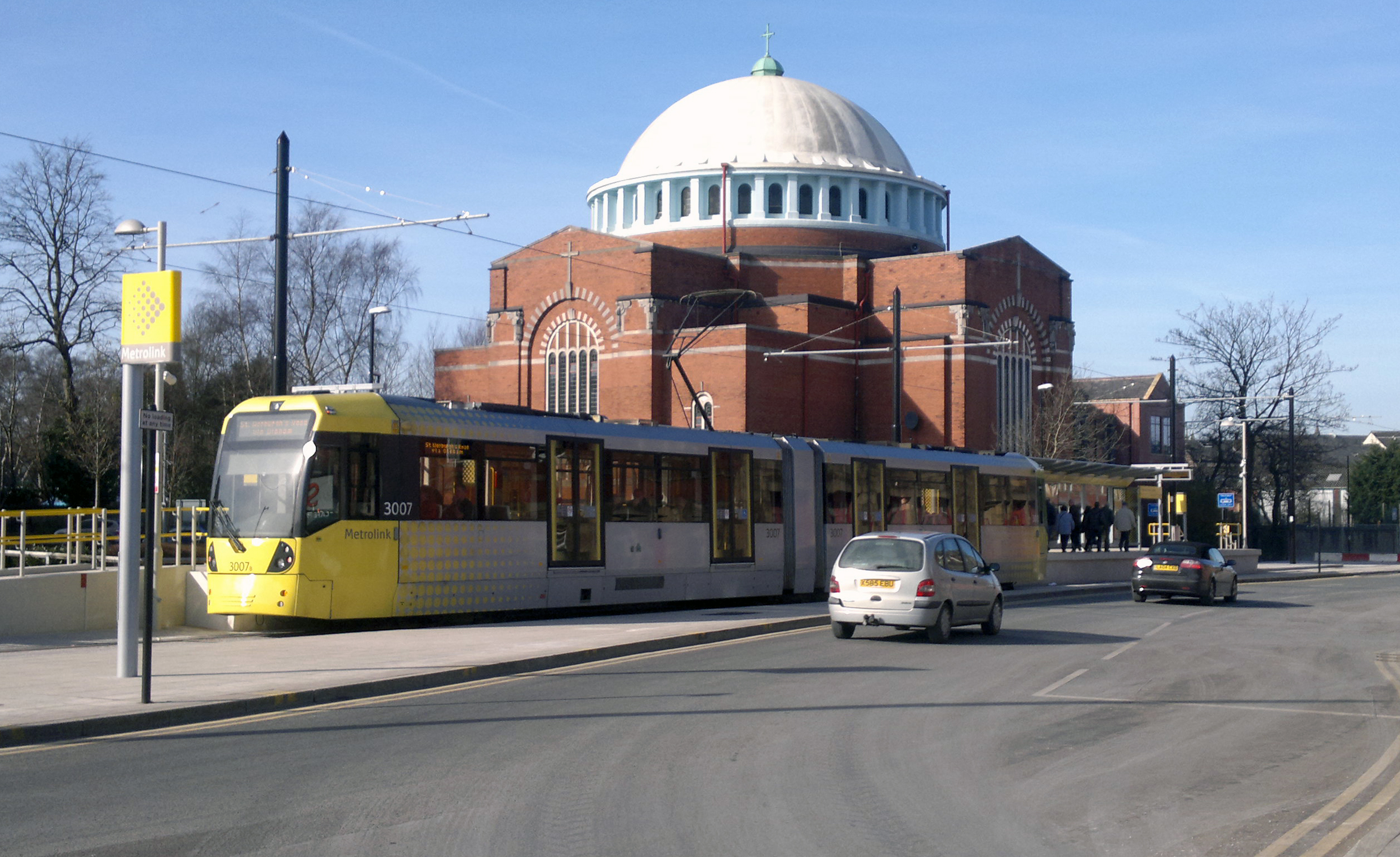
- The Metrolink stop on its opening day

General information
- Location: Rochdale, Metropolitan Borough of Rochdale, England
- System: Metrolink station
- Line: Oldham and Rochdale Line
- Platforms: 2

Other information
- Status: In operation
- Fare zone: 4

History
- Opened: 28 February 2013
- Original company: Metrolink
Route map
Location

Proposals to link Rochdale to a light rail system were put forward in the 1980s, but remained unfunded until the 2000s. Plans to extend Greater Manchester's Metrolink network to Rochdale were part of the expansion project Phase 3A, began in 2009. Under these plans, most of the Oldham Loop line was converted to light rail operation. Northern Rail services via Oldham ceased in October 2009, when the line closed to allow this conversion work to start. The Metrolink stop at Rochdale station opened to passengers on 28 February 2013. Trams now pass over the main Calder Vale line on a flyover before descending to street level, en route to the new stop at the front of the main line station.

A further phase of the project, Phase 3B, proposed the addition of a Metrolink branch via the old branch line via Oldham Central and the extension of the northern end of the line via a line to Rochdale Town Centre. Following the rejection of the Greater Manchester Transport Innovation Fund in a referendum in 2008, Phase 3B of the project was in doubt until new funding from national and local government enabled the project to go ahead. These extensions were completed through to Oldham in January 2014, with the extension to the centre of Rochdale completed in late March 2014.

=== Northern Hub ===
Following Metrolink enhancements, £300,000 was invested jointly by Network Rail, Northern Trains and the GMPTE to renovate the station, as part of the Department for Transport's National Station Improvement Programme. The CCTV system was extended, with improved toilets, flooring and subway.

A further round of upgrades and improvements to the station was announced by the government in July 2012, as part of the upgrade scheme for the Manchester area. This included the provision of a new bay platform for terminating trains from the Manchester direction at the south end of the station, and the refurbishment and recommissioning of the disused Miall St subway; this was duly reopened in July 2015. Completion of the works in the Manchester area permits through running from the station to Manchester Airport, via the new Ordsall Chord, as well as to Liverpool Lime Street and Blackpool North, via Manchester Victoria.

Several of these proposals were included in the next Northern franchise, which became active in April 2016. Trains with the operator's new Northern Connect brand served the station, offering through services to Liverpool and Chester, via Warrington Bank Quay; there were also extra evening and Sunday trains on the existing routes.

== Facilities ==
There is a 217-space park and ride car park nearby. This is located on Hare Street to the rear of the station and is available for all users. There is step-free access with lifts and a ticket office.

== Services ==
=== National Rail ===
Northern Trains operates the following general off-peak timetable in trains per hour (tph):

- 1 tph to Chester, via Manchester Victoria, Newton-le-Willows and Warrington Bank Quay
- 1 tph to Wigan Wallgate, via Manchester Victoria, Salford Crescent and Walkden
- 1 tph to Headbolt Lane, via Manchester Victoria, Walkden and Wigan Wallgate
- 2 tph to Blackburn, via Mills Hill, Manchester Victoria and Bolton; of which:
  - 1 tph extends to Clitheroe
- 2 tph to Leeds, via Hebden Bridge, Halifax and Bradford Interchange
- 1 tph to Leeds, via Hebden Bridge, Brighouse and Dewsbury
- 1 tph to Blackburn via Todmorden, Burnley Manchester Road and Accrington.

The services on this route were revamped significantly at the December 2008 timetable change and again in May 2018. There are now six trains per hour to Manchester Victoria and three to Leeds during the daytime, with a fourth that runs through to Blackburn, via Burnley Manchester Road, following the full commissioning of the Todmorden Curve from 17 May 2015.

=== Metrolink ===
There is a basic service of five trams per hour to Oldham Mumps and Manchester Victoria, continuing on to East Didsbury.

Preceding station	National Rail	Following station
Manchester Victoria	Northern Trains; Calder Valley Line	Todmorden
Mills Hill	Northern Trains; Calder Valley Line	Todmorden
Mills Hill	Northern Trains; Calder Valley Line	Smithy Bridge
Castleton	Northern Trains; Calder Valley Line	Smithy Bridge
Preceding station	Manchester Metrolink	Following station
Newbold towards East Didsbury	East Didsbury–Rochdale	Rochdale Town Centre Terminus
Historical railways
Milnrow	Lancashire and Yorkshire Railway; Oldham Loop Line	Terminus
Disused railways
Terminus	Lancashire and Yorkshire Railway; Rochdale to Bacup Line	Wardleworth; Line and station closed

== Gallery ==
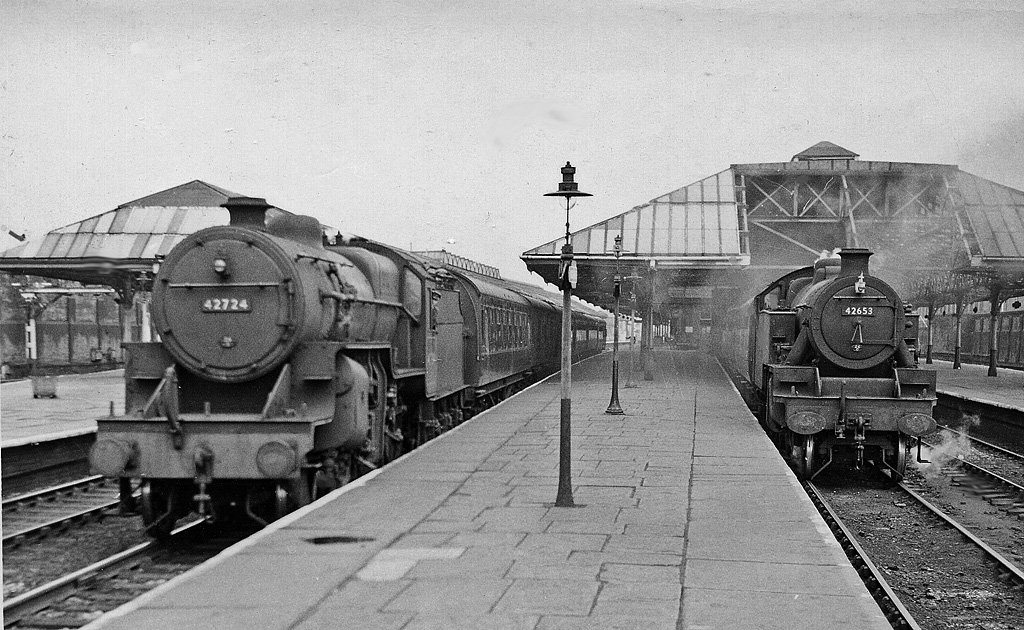
1959

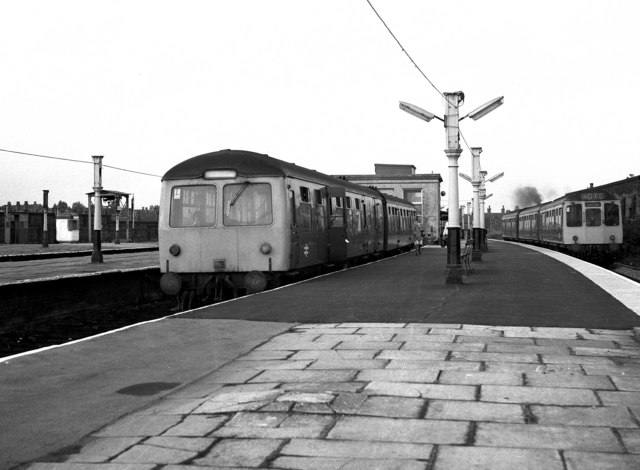
1977

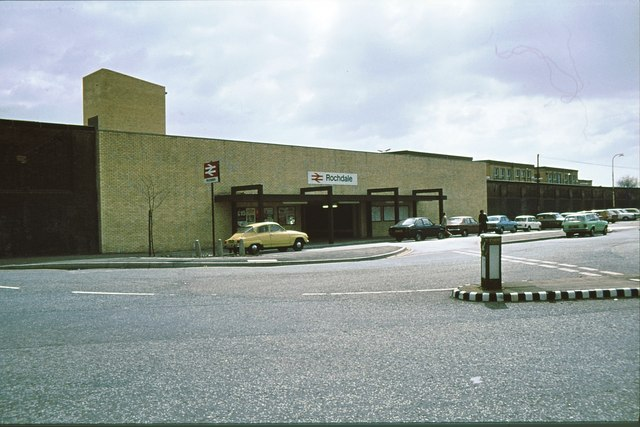
1980

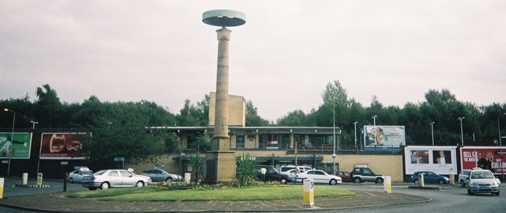
2007
