= Shaw and Crompton tram stop =

Manchester Metrolink tram stop

Shaw and Crompton
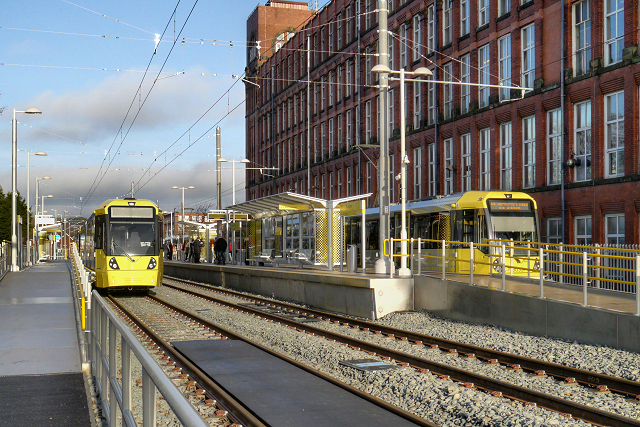
- Shaw and Crompton tram stop, on its opening day

General information
- Location: Shaw and Crompton, Oldham; England
- Coordinates: 53.57618°N 2.08953°W
- Grid reference: SD941088
- System: Metrolink station
- Line: Oldham and Rochdale Line
- Platforms: 3

Other information
- Status: In operation
- Fare zone: 4

History
- Opened: 2 November 1863
- Former names: Shaw
- Original company: Lancashire and Yorkshire Railway
- Pre-grouping: Lancashire and Yorkshire Railway
- Post-grouping: London, Midland and Scottish Railway

Key dates
- 2009: Closed as a Shaw & Crompton rail station
- 16 December 2012: Conversion to Metrolink operation and renamed Shaw and Crompton
- 1 December 1897; 6 May 1974; 15 May 1989: Renamed
Route map
Location

Shaw and Crompton is a tram stop on the Oldham and Rochdale Line (ORL) of Greater Manchester's light-rail Metrolink system. It opened to passengers on 16 December 2012 and is located in Shaw and Crompton, a part of the Metropolitan Borough of Oldham, England.

The station sits adjacent to the site of the original Shaw and Crompton railway station, a regional rail station which opened (initially for haulage) on 2 November 1863 and closed on 3 October 2009 for conversion to Metrolink. Known as Shaw railway station between 1974 and 1989, it was along the Oldham Loop Line, which operated from Manchester to Rochdale via Oldham and thus was almost identical to the current Metrolink route.

== History ==
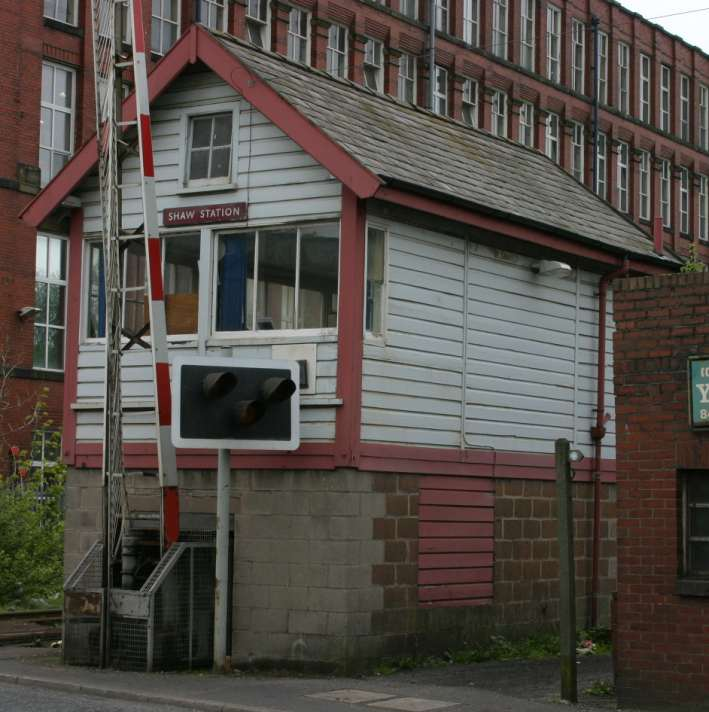
Former signal box, demolished during conversion to light rail

The railway line between Oldham Mumps and Rochdale was first proposed in 1845, but not authorised until 1859. The line was opened to freight trains on 12 August 1863, and for passengers on 2 November. One of the four new stations opened that day was Shaw, 2 1/2 miles (4.0 km) from Oldham Mumps. The new line from Oldham Mumps to Rochdale East Junction created a Middleton Junction to Rochdale route. In 1880 a line was built from Oldham Werneth to Thorpes Bridge Junction near Newton Heath. Subsequently, the whole Thorpes Bridge Junction to Rochdale East Junction route became known as the Oldham Loop Line. The pattern of train services on the Oldham Loop Line involved a greater number of trains serving the Oldham stations, and less services continuing on to Rochdale. In the 1960s and 1970s fewer and fewer trains ran from Oldham Mumps to Rochdale, and in May 1972 the Secretary of State for Transport announced that this part of the Oldham Loop including Shaw and Crompton Station would be closed. The closure did not go ahead because SELNEC PTE (which became Greater Manchester Passenger Transport Executive (GMPTE) in 1974) agreed to fund the continuation of services. The involvement of the GMPTE led to a more frequent pattern of trains serving the Oldham Mumps to Rochdale section.

Intended originally to serve local cotton mills, the station later became used by commuters. It was renamed three times: originally named Shaw, it became Shaw and Crompton on 1 December 1897; Shaw on 6 May 1974; and finally Shaw and Crompton on 15 May 1989.

The station had a signal cabin (which supervised the southern end of the single track section to Rochdale, along with the turnback siding used by terminating trains from Manchester) and one of the United Kingdom's sixteen hundred road level crossings. The box was closed and demolished during the conversion work, whilst the crossing is now protected by traffic lights.

After being initially shelved, plans to turn the line into part of Greater Manchester's Metrolink network were accepted by the government on 6 July 2006.

The station closed on 3 October 2009, was converted to light rail and re-opened on 16 December 2012. The new station was built on the opposite side of Beal Lane, removing the need for terminating trams to cross the road. Services were extended from Shaw northbound to Rochdale via Milnrow on 28 February 2013.

A park and ride facility with 93 car parking spaces is located at the station.

== Service pattern ==
Preceding station	Manchester Metrolink	Following station
Derker towards East Didsbury	East Didsbury–Rochdale	Newhey towards Rochdale Town Centre
Derker towards East Didsbury	East Didsbury–Shaw (peak only)	Terminus
Proposed
Cop Road towards East Didsbury	East Didsbury–Rochdale	Newhey towards Rochdale Town Centre
Cop Road towards East Didsbury	East Didsbury–Shaw (peak only)	Terminus
Historical railways
Royton Junction	L&YR; Oldham Loop Line	New Hey
