= Rochdale Town Centre tram stop =

Manchester Metrolink tram stop

Rochdale Town Centre
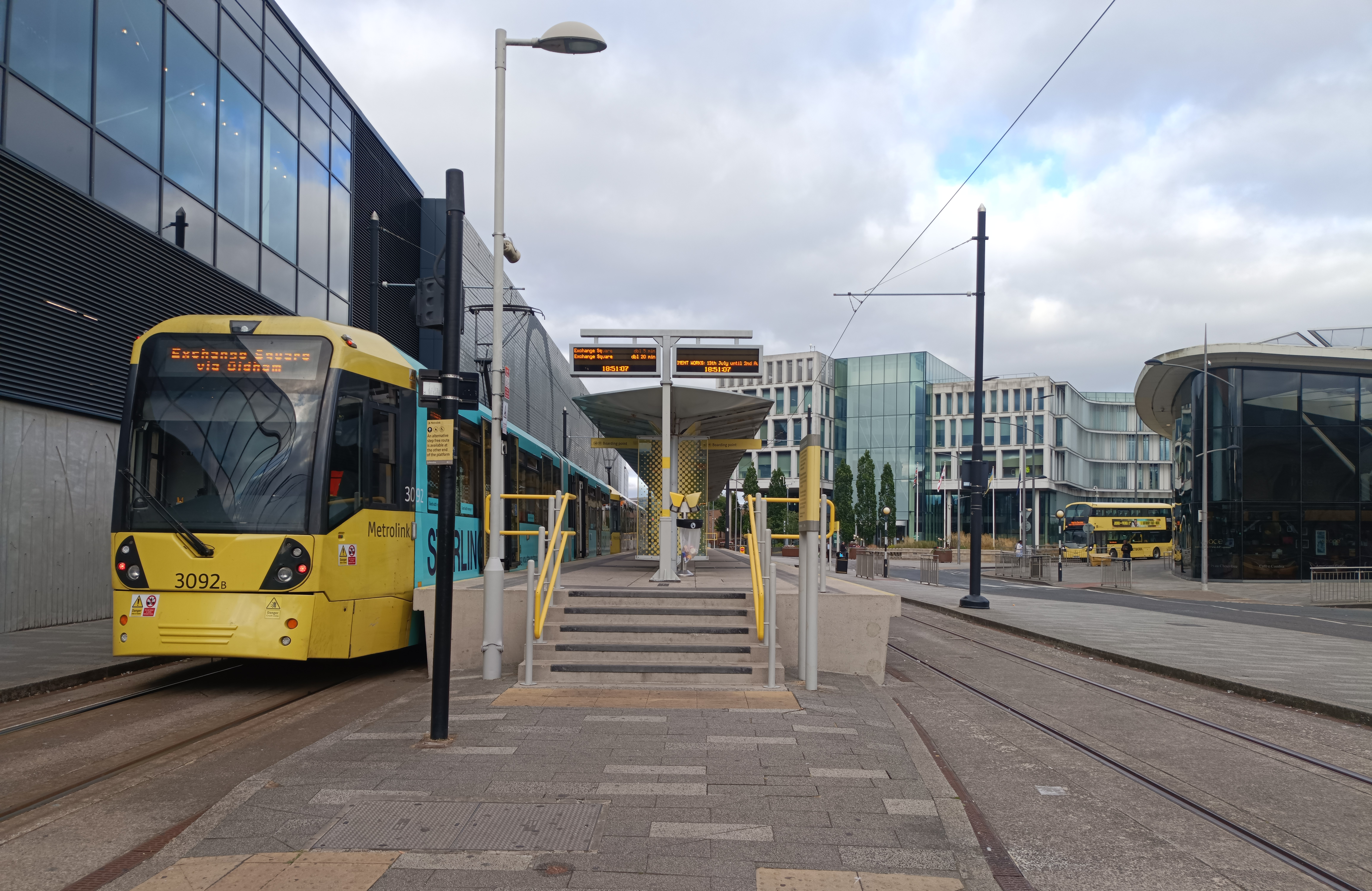
- Rochdale Town Centre tram stop in July 2026

General information
- Location: Rochdale, Rochdale; England
- Coordinates: 53.61733°N 2.15538°W
- Grid reference: SD897134
- System: Metrolink station
- Line: Oldham and Rochdale Line
- Platforms: 2

Other information
- Status: In operation
- Fare zone: 4

History
- Opened: 31 March 2014
Route map
Location

Rochdale Town Centre is a tram stop and the terminus on the Oldham and Rochdale Line (ORL) of Greater Manchester's light-rail Metrolink system. It was constructed as part of Phase 3b of the system's expansion, and is located on Smith Street, adjacent to Rochdale Interchange and Number One Riverside, in central Rochdale, England. It opened on 31 March 2014.

== Services ==
Services run every 12 minutes on all routes.

Preceding station	Manchester Metrolink	Following station
Rochdale Railway Station towards East Didsbury	East Didsbury–Rochdale	Terminus
