= List of Manchester Metrolink tram stops =

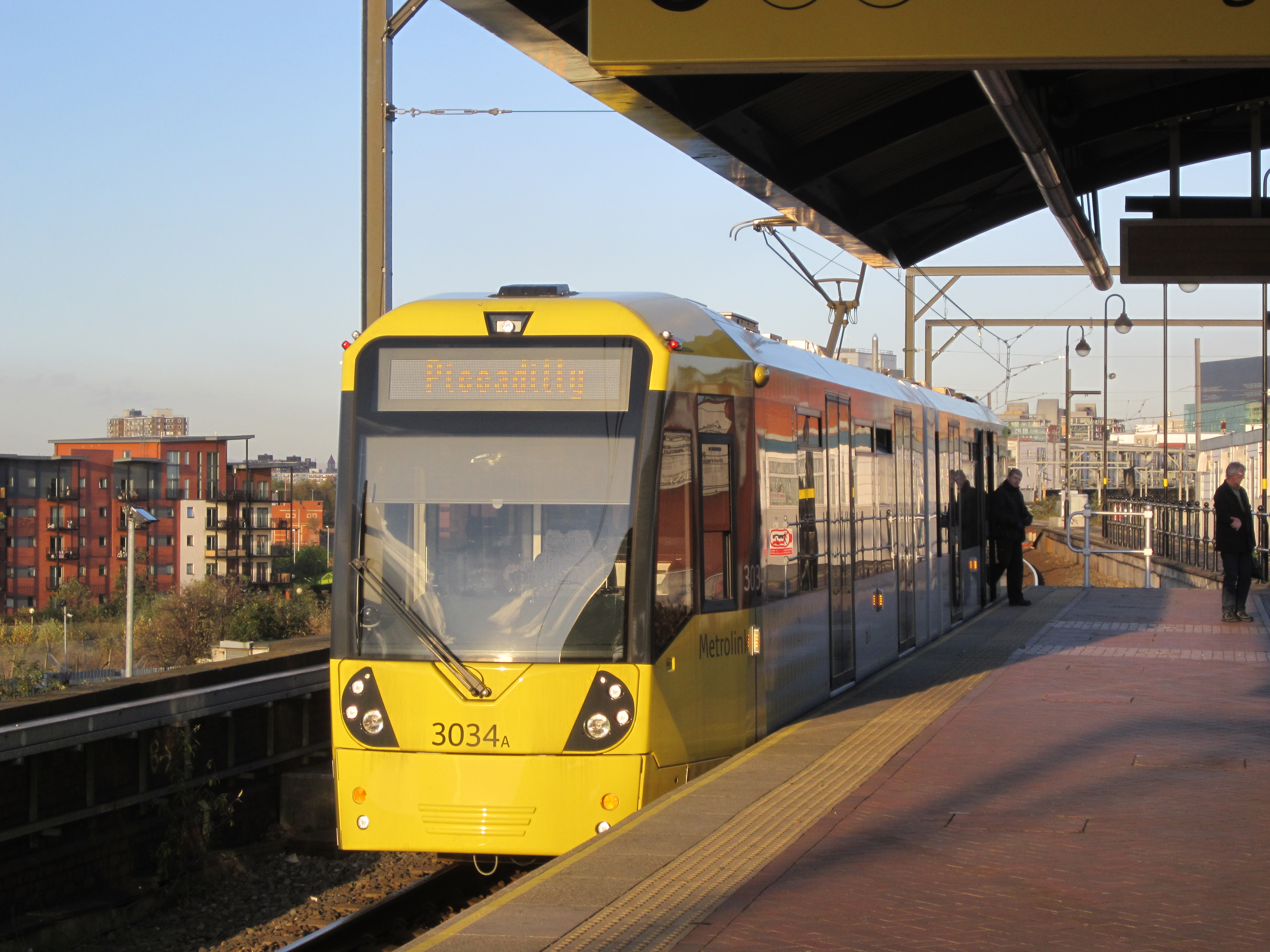
Cornbrook tram stop, a major interchange on the Metrolink network

Since opening in 1992, the Manchester Metrolink light-rail/tram system has grown to a network of 99 tram stops.

The system opened on 6 April 1992 with 10 tram stops from Manchester Victoria station to Bury, beginning Phase 1 of the network's expansion. Phase 1 continued and lines through the city centre and to Altrincham were built and opened on 27 April and 15 June of that year respectively, along with a short spur to Manchester Piccadilly railway station via Piccadilly Gardens on 20 July.

Before Phase 2, in 1998, High Street tram stop was closed, and Market Street was redeveloped to a bi-directional tram stop.

Phase 2 gave the network 12 new tram stops: a new interchange at Cornbrook was opened, plus a new line through Salford Quays up to Broadway tram stop in 1999, and was extended to Eccles in 2000.

Before Phase 3 began, on 20 September 2010, MediaCityUK tram stop opened on a small spur of the Eccles Line, and G-Mex tram stop was renamed to Deansgate-Castlefield, its current name.

Phase 3a involved the construction of 36 new stops and new lines to Oldham and Rochdale, Droylsden and Chorlton. The first stops as part of Phase 3a opened on 7 July 2011 on the South Manchester Line up to St Werburgh's Road and the final stop opened on 31 March 2014 on the Oldham and Rochdale Line up to Rochdale Town Centre.

Woodlands Road tram stop closed in 2013 to make way for two new stops at Queens Road, serving the Metrolink depot and transport museum, and Abraham Moss, serving the library and leisure centre in the area.

During Phase 3b, a new 9 miles (14 km) line to Manchester Airport became operational in November 2014 - over a year ahead of schedule. The East Manchester Line was extended from Droylsden to Ashton-under-Lyne, and the South Manchester Line from St Werburgh's Road in Chorlton to East Didsbury.

After the Airport Line opened, the Manchester Metrolink was complete, but could still be extended to regions not reached, which led to the Trafford Park Line opening to the Trafford Centre in March 2020.

The network now consists of over 64 miles (103 km) of track, making it the largest tram system in the United Kingdom and second only to the London Underground in terms of an urban commuter network. The Metrolink system has 99 stops.

Primary future proposals include tram-trains to Bolton, Heywood, Hale, and Wigan, a spur off the Bury Line to Middleton, Ashton to Stalybridge, the Wythenshawe Loop, and most likely the first to happen, an extension from East Didsbury to Stockport's interchange.

== List of Metrolink stops ==
=== Current stops ===
Borough	Tram stops
Manchester	42
Trafford	18
Oldham	10
Salford	10
Tameside	7
Bury	6
Rochdale	6
Bolton	0
Stockport	0
Wigan	0
Total	99

Correct as of 8 March 2024

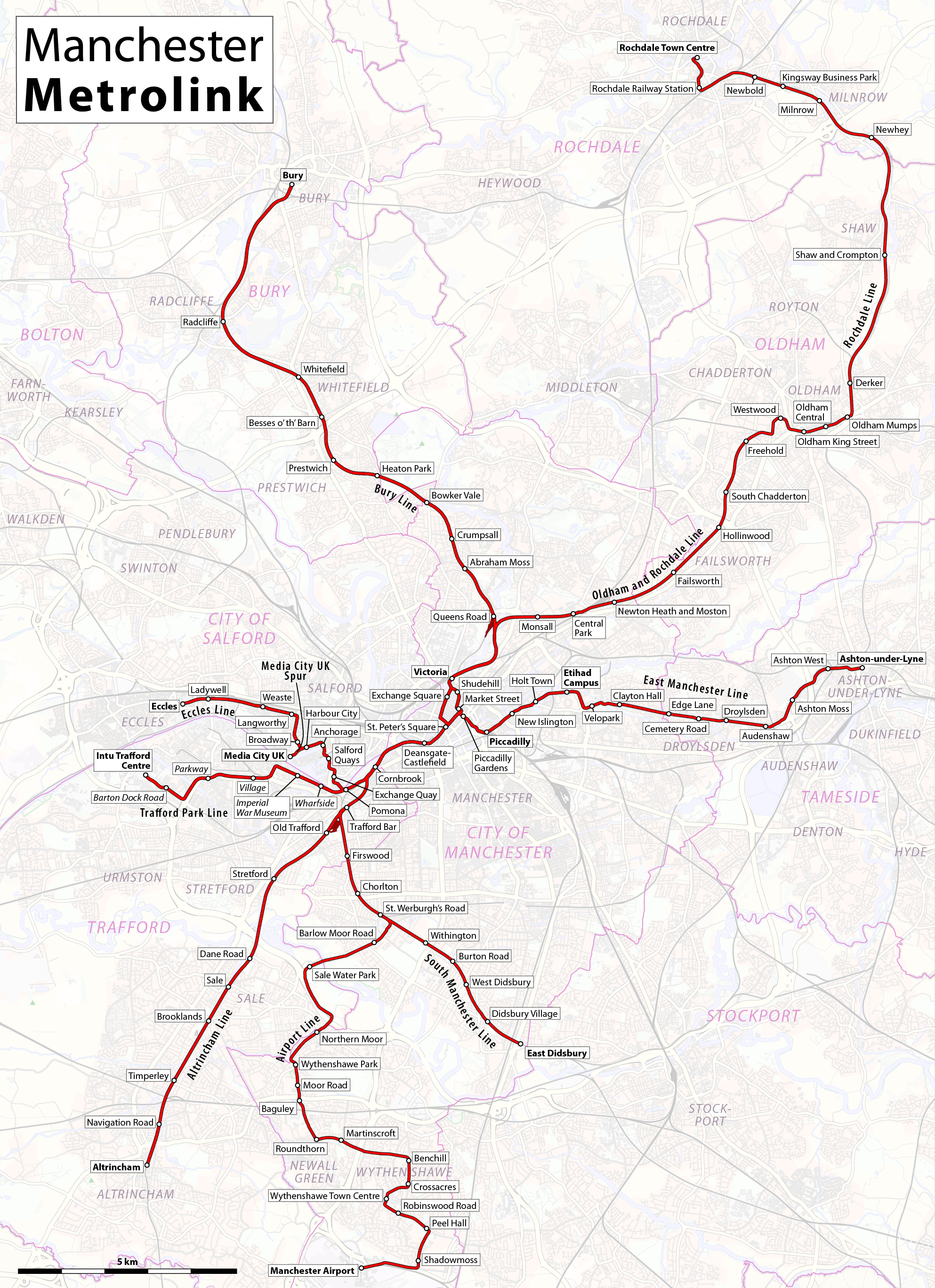
Geographic map of the system

Tram stop	Photo	Line	Metropolitan borough	District	Opened	Zone	Footfall 2021/22	Notes
Abraham Moss		Bury	Manchester	Cheetham Hill	18 April 2011	2	153,900	For Abraham Moss Library and College Campus.
Altrincham ( Altrincham)		Altrincham	Trafford	Altrincham	15 June 1992	4	1,755,800	For Altrincham Interchange. Terminus of the Altrincham Line.
Anchorage		Eccles	Salford	Salford Quays	6 December 1999	2	230,721	For Anchorage Quay.
Ashton Moss		East Manchester	Tameside	Ashton Moss	9 October 2013	3	128,400	For Ashton Leisure Complex and Snipe Retail Park.
Ashton-under-Lyne ( Ashton-under-Lyne)		East Manchester	Tameside	Ashton-under-Lyne	9 October 2013	3	499,100	For Ashton-under-lyne Interchange and its railway station. Terminus of the East Manchester Line.
Ashton West		East Manchester	Tameside	Ashton Moss	9 October 2013	3	85,200	For Leisure and retail complex and Tameside stadium
Audenshaw		East Manchester	Tameside	Audenshaw	9 October 2013	3	129,800	Serves Audenshaw.
Baguley		Airport	Manchester	Baguley	3 November 2014	3	82,800	Serves Baguley and Roundthorn Industrial Estate.
Barlow Moor Road		Airport	Manchester	Chorlton-cum-Hardy	3 November 2014	2/3	290,700	For Chorlton Park.
Benchill		Airport	Manchester	Wythenshawe Civic Centre	3 November 2014	4	122,200	For Benchill Health Centre, and sixth form college
Besses o' th' Barn		Bury	Bury	Besses o' th' Barn	6 April 1992	3	319,400	Serves small area of Whitefield, Manchester.
Bowker Vale		Bury	Manchester	Higher Blackley	6 April 1992	2/3	310,500	Serves Higher Blackley and Bowker Vale areas of Manchester.
Broadway		Eccles	Salford	Salford Quays	6 December 1999	2	87,521	Serves MediaCityUK, along with Harbour City and MediaCityUK tram stops.
Brooklands		Altrincham	Trafford	Brooklands	15 June 1992	3/4	768,900	Serves the Brooklands area of Sale.
Burton Road		South Manchester	Manchester	Didsbury	23 May 2013	3	786,300	For Withington, Withington Community Hospital, and West Didsbury.
Bury		Bury	Bury	Bury	6 April 1992	4	1,699,400	For Bury Interchange and the town centre. Terminus of the Bury Line.
Cemetery Road		East Manchester	Tameside	Droylsden	8 February 2013	3	112,800	Serves parts of Droylsden and Fairfield.
Central Park		Oldham and Rochdale	Manchester	Newton Heath	13 June 2012	2	147,500	For Central Park (business park), and Moston.
Chorlton		South Manchester	Manchester	Chorlton-cum-Hardy	7 July 2011	2	1,216,800	Serves Chorlton.
Clayton Hall		East Manchester	Manchester	Clayton	8 February 2013	2	100,900	For Clayton Hall and the rest of Clayton.
Cornbrook		Altrincham	Manchester	St George's	6 December 1999	1/2	1,289,000	Major interchange on the Metrolink network.
Crossacres		Airport	Manchester	Wythenshawe Civic Centre	3 November 2014	4	54,800	For Crossacres and Wythenshawe Fire Station.
Crumpsall		Bury	Manchester	Crumpsall	6 April 1992	2	358,500	Serves Crumpsall.
Dane Road		Altrincham	Trafford	Sale	15 June 1992	3	275,100	For Priory Gardens and parts of Sale.
Deansgate-Castlefield ( Deansgate)		First City Crossing	Manchester	Castlefield	27 April 1992	1	2,506,400	For Great Northern Warehouse, Mamucium Roman Fort, Beetham Tower, and Deansgate Locks. Formerly named G-Mex (1992–2010). A third platform was added in 2015.
Derker		Oldham and Rochdale	Oldham	Derker	16 December 2012	3/4	265,900	Serves Derker in Oldham.
Didsbury Village		South Manchester	Manchester	Didsbury	23 May 2013	3	542,400	For Didsbury Park.
Droylsden		East Manchester	Tameside	Droylsden	8 February 2013	3	199,200	Serves parts of Droylsden and Audenshaw. Former terminus of the East Manchester Line. (Feb-Oct 2013)
East Didsbury ( East Didsbury)		South Manchester	Manchester	Parrs Wood	23 May 2013	3	598,300	For East Didsbury railway station, and Parrs Wood bus station. Terminus of the South Manchester Line.
Eccles ( Eccles)		Eccles	Salford	Eccles	21 July 2000	2	390,100	For Eccles Interchange. Terminus of the Eccles Line.
Edge Lane		East Manchester	Tameside	Droylsden	8 February 2013	2/3	198,000	Serves parts of East Manchester and Droylsden.
Etihad Campus		East Manchester	Manchester	Beswick	8 February 2013	2	326,400	For the City of Manchester Stadium and Sportcity.
Exchange Quay		Eccles	Salford	Salford Quays	6 December 1999	2	798,821	For Exchange Quay and Ordsall.
Exchange Square		Second City Crossing	Manchester	Deansgate	6 December 2015	1	1,611,500	For the Manchester Arndale.
Failsworth		Oldham and Rochdale	Oldham	Failsworth	13 June 2012	3	242,100	Serves Failsworth and parts of New Moston.
Firswood		South Manchester	Trafford	Firswood	7 July 2011	2	318,800	Serves parts of Old Trafford as well as Firswood.
Freehold		Oldham and Rochdale	Oldham	Werneth	13 June 2012	3	207,100	Serves Freehold, and parts of Chadderton and Werneth.
Harbour City		Eccles	Salford	Salford Quays	6 December 1999	2	377,621	Serves Salford Quays, and MediaCityUK, along with Broadway and MediaCityUK tram stops.
Heaton Park		Bury	Bury	Prestwich	6 April 1992	3	572,000	For Heaton Park and parts of Prestwich.
Hollinwood		Oldham and Rochdale	Oldham	Hollinwood	13 June 2012	3	241,900	Serves parts of Failsworth, New Moston, and Whitegate.
Holt Town		East Manchester	Manchester	Bradford	8 February 2013	2	66,300	Serves Bradford (Manchester), and parts of Beswick.
Imperial War Museum		Trafford Park	Trafford	Trafford Park	22 March 2020	2	269,600	For the Imperial War Museum and Salford Quays.
Kingsway Business Park		Oldham and Rochdale	Rochdale	Firgrove	28 February 2013	4	181,700	For Kingsway Business Park and Firgrove.
Ladywell		Eccles	Salford	Weaste	21 July 2000	2	254,121	Named after Ladywell Roundabout. Serves Canterbury Gardens and parts of Trafford Park.
Langworthy		Eccles	Salford	Seedley	21 July 2000	2	198,821	Serves Langworthy and parts of Seedley and Salford.
Manchester Airport ( Airport railway station Manchester Airport)		Airport	Manchester	Ringway	3 November 2014	4	233,900	For Manchester Airport and its railway station. Terminus of the Airport Line.
Market Street		First City Crossing	Manchester	Northern Quarter	27 April 1992	1	1,668,500	For Manchester's main retail district, and the Manchester Arndale.
Martinscroft		Airport	Manchester	Baguley	3 November 2014	4	96,700	Named after adjacent road. Serves parts of Baguley and Newall Green.
MediaCityUK		MediaCityUK spur	Salford	MediaCityUK	20 September 2010	2	936,021	For Salford Quays and MediaCityUK.
Milnrow		Oldham and Rochdale	Rochdale	Milnrow	28 February 2013	4	235,800	Serves the village of Milnrow.
Monsall		Oldham and Rochdale	Manchester	Monsall	13 June 2012	2	76,900	Serves Monsall.
Moor Road		Airport	Manchester	Baguley	3 November 2014	3	136,600	For Wythenshawe Park, Brooklands Library, and Brookway Retail Park.
Navigation Road		Altrincham	Trafford	Altrincham	15 June 1992	4	520,300	Mainline trains run on adjacent platform. For Altrincham and Navigation Recreation Ground.
New Islington		East Manchester	Manchester	New Islington	8 February 2013	1	560,500	For New Islington, Bradford, and Ancoats.
Newbold		Oldham and Rochdale	Rochdale	Newbold	28 February 2013	4	192,800	For Newbold, Rochdale, and Firgrove.
Newhey		Oldham and Rochdale	Rochdale	Newhey	28 February 2013	4	122,200	For Minrow and Newhey.
Newton Heath and Moston		Oldham and Rochdale	Manchester	Newton Heath	13 June 2012	2/3	193,300	For Newton Heath and parts of Moston.
Northern Moor		Airport	Manchester	Northern Moor	3 November 2014	3	171,300	For Sale Moor and Northern Moor.
Old Trafford		Altrincham	Trafford	Old Trafford	15 June 1992	2	958,200	For Old Trafford Cricket Ground.
Oldham Central		Oldham and Rochdale	Oldham	Oldham Town Centre	27 January 2014	3	478,900	For The Spindles shopping centre.
Oldham King Street		Oldham and Rochdale	Oldham	Oldham Town Centre	27 January 2014	3	252,600	For Oldham Sixth Form College and leisure centre.
Oldham Mumps		Oldham and Rochdale	Oldham	Oldham Town Centre	27 January 2014	3	274,300	For Oldham Mumps bus station.
Parkway		Trafford Park	Trafford	Trafford Park	22 March 2020	2/3	102,100	Named after Parkway Circle. For Bowlers Exhibition Centre.
Peel Hall		Airport	Manchester	Woodhouse Park	3 November 2014	4	50,400	For Peel Hall, Heald Green railway station and Woodhouse Park.
Piccadilly ( Piccadilly)		Piccadilly spur	Manchester	Piccadilly	20 July 1992	1	2,379,400	For Manchester Piccadilly railway station.
Piccadilly Gardens		Piccadilly spur	Manchester	Piccadilly	20 July 1992	1	2,618,900	For Manchester Piccadilly Gardens bus station.
Pomona		Eccles	Trafford	Pomona Docks	6 December 1999	2	23,730	Interchange stop for Eccles and Trafford Park lines. For Pomona Docks.
Prestwich		Bury	Bury	Prestwich	6 April 1992	3	735,400	For Prestwich town centre.
Queens Road		Bury	Manchester	Cheetham Hill	16 December 2013	2	142,300	For Cheetham Hill, Museum of Transport, Queens Road Metrolink depot and Queens Road bus depot
Radcliffe		Bury	Bury	Radcliffe	6 April 1992	4	573,300	For Radcliffe town centre.
Robinswood Road		Airport	Manchester	Woodhouse Park	3 November 2014	4	28,700	For Woodhouse Park and Wythenshawe Civic Centre.
Rochdale Railway Station ( Rochdale)		Oldham and Rochdale	Rochdale	Rochdale Town Centre	28 February 2013	4	208,000	For Rochdale railway station.
Rochdale Town Centre		Oldham and Rochdale	Rochdale	Rochdale Town Centre	31 March 2014	4	544,200	For Rochdale Interchange and Number One Riverside. Terminus of the Oldham-Rochdale Line.
Roundthorn		Airport	Manchester	Baguley	3 November 2014	3/4	235,500	For Roundthorn industrial estate and Wythenshawe Hospital.
Sale		Altrincham	Trafford	Sale	15 June 1992	3	1,097,100	For Sale town centre.
Sale Water Park		Airport	Trafford	Sale Moor	3 November 2014	3	138,300	For Sale Water Park and Sale Moor.
Salford Quays		Eccles	Salford	Salford Quays	6 December 1999	2	459,821	For Salford Quays. Close to the site of former Salford Docks.
Shadowmoss		Airport	Manchester	Moss Nook	3 November 2014	4	76,400	For Moss Nook and Woodhouse Park.
Shaw and Crompton		Oldham and Rochdale	Oldham	Shaw and Crompton	16 December 2012	4	497,200	For Shaw and Crompton, High Crompton, and Heyside.
Shudehill (Shudehill Interchange)		First City Crossing	Manchester	Northern Quarter	31 March 2003	1	710,000	For The Printworks and Manchester Shudehill bus station.
South Chadderton		Oldham and Rochdale	Oldham	Chadderton	13 June 2012	3	215,000	For Chadderton and Butler Green.
St Peter's Square		First City Crossing	Manchester	Petersfield	27 April 1992	1	4,930,000	Closed from 28 June 2015 – 28 August 2016 for re-development and was transformed into a four-platform interchange due to Phase 2CC.
St Werburgh's Road		South Manchester	Manchester	Chorlton-cum-Hardy	7 July 2011	2/3	279,500	For interchange with South Manchester and Airport lines. Former terminus of the South Manchester Line.
Stretford		Altrincham	Trafford	Stretford	15 June 1992	2/3	775,500	For Stretford town centre, Longford Park and Turn Moss Playing Fields.
The Trafford Centre		Trafford Park	Trafford	Trafford Park	22 March 2020	3	515,400	For The Trafford Centre shopping centre and its bus station.
Timperley		Altrincham	Trafford	Timperley	15 June 1992	4	536,700	For West Timperley and Boradheath.
Trafford Bar		Altrincham	Trafford	Old Trafford	15 June 1992	2	855,900	For Old Trafford. Interchange stop with the Altrincham and South Manchester Lines.
Trafford Palazzo		Trafford Park	Trafford	Trafford Park	22 March 2020	3	219,300	Opened as Barton Dock Road.
Velopark		East Manchester	Manchester	Clayton	8 February 2013	2	212,700	For The Velodrome, Eastlands, Clayton, and Etihad Campus.
Victoria ( Manchester Victoria)		Bury	Manchester	Victoria	6 April 1992	1	1,855,500	Redeveloped from 2014 to 2015 with two extra platforms (4). Interchange stop for the Bury and Oldham-Rochdale lines. For Manchester Victoria railway station.
Village		Trafford Park	Trafford	Trafford Park	22 March 2020	2	62,600	For Westbrook Business Park and Trafford Park freight terminal.
Weaste		Eccles	Salford	Weaste	21 July 2000	2	204,021	For Weaste, Seedley, and Buile Hill Park.
West Didsbury		South Manchester	Manchester	Didsbury	23 May 2013	3	414,900	For West Didsbury and Withington.
Westwood		Oldham and Rochdale	Oldham	Westwood	27 January 2014	3	126,900	For Boundary Park, Chadderton, Westwood, and Werneth.
Wharfside		Trafford Park	Trafford	Trafford Park	22 March 2020	2	333,700	For Old Trafford Stadium and MediaCityUK.
Whitefield		Bury	Bury	Whitefield	6 April 1992	3/4	718,800	For Whitefield town centre.
Withington		South Manchester	Manchester	Hough End	23 May 2013	3	183,900	For Hough End and parts of Withington.
Wythenshawe Park		Airport	Manchester	Northern Moor	3 November 2014	3	159,800	For Wythenshawe Park and parts of Brooklands and Baguley.
Wythenshawe Town Centre		Airport	Manchester	Wythenshawe Town Centre	3 November 2014	4	306,400	For Wythenshawe Interchange.

=== Former stops ===
Stop	Photo	Line^{[*]}	Metropolitan borough	District	Closed	Notes
High Street		First City Crossing	Manchester	Northern Quarter	10 August 1998	Closed in 1998 due to car traffic requirements on High Street. Replaced with a bi-direction Market Street.
Mosley Street		First City Crossing	Manchester	Piccadilly	18 May 2013	Closed in 2013 due to insufficient capacity with the opening of new Metrolink lines. More services created a bottleneck and trams at this stop would frequently hold-up trams behind so the stop was removed.
Woodlands Road		Bury	Manchester	Cheetham Hill	16 December 2013	Closed to make way for Queens Road (serving the depot), and Abraham Moss (serving the library and school). Originally a railway station, which was closed for Metrolink.
Oldham Mumps		Oldham and Rochdale	Manchester	Oldham	18 January 2014	Temporary stop closed in 2014 due to the new tram line though Oldham Town Centre being completed. Replaced with new Oldham Mumps.

=== Fictional stops ===
A fictional tram stop, Weatherfield North, was introduced into the Granada Television soap opera Coronation Street in 2018. The tram stop is located at the Coronation Street set in MediaCityUK.

== Map ==
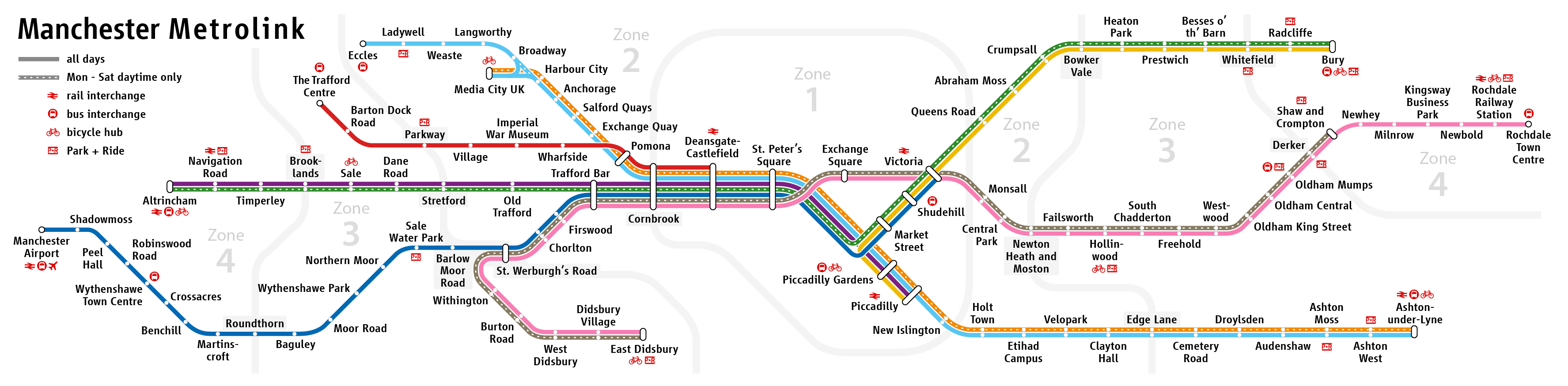

== Future ==
=== Proposed ===
Buckley Wells, Elton Reservoir and Sandhills have been proposed as additional stops on the Bury Line, as well as Cop Road on the Oldham and Rochdale Line.

Plans for Buckley Wells tram stop were eventually cancelled.

Stop	Line^{[*]}	Metropolitan borough	District	Planned opening	Notes
Cop Road	Oldham and Rochdale Line	Oldham	Moorside		
Davenport Green	Wythenshawe Loop	Manchester	Wythenshawe		
Elton Reservoir	Bury Line	Bury	Fishpool		
Gorsey Bank	Stockport Line	Stockport	Stockport		
Heaton Mersey	Stockport Line	Heaton Mersey	Stockport		
Kings Reach	Stockport Line	Stockport	Stockport		
Newall Green	Wythenshawe Loop	Manchester	Wythenshawe		
Piccadilly Central	TBD	Manchester	Piccadilly		
Port Salford	Trafford Park Line	Salford	Barton-upon-Irwell		
Salford Reds	Trafford Park Line	Salford	Barton-upon-Irwell		
Sandhills	Bury Line	Manchester	Collyhurst		
Stockport Interchange	Stockport Line	Stockport	Stockport		
Trafford Quays	Trafford Park Line	Trafford	Trafford Park		
Wythenshawe Hospital	Wythenshawe Loop	Manchester	Wythenshawe		

=== Cancelled ===
Some stops were planned along new lines but were eventually dropped. All cancelled stops were scheduled to open before 2019 when the zonal fares system was implemented, so therefore, did not have a Metrolink zone.

Stop	Line(s)^{[*]}	Metropolitan borough	District	Metrolink Zone	Planned opening	Notes
Drake Street	Oldham and Rochdale Line	Rochdale	Rochdale	-	-	Was to open between Rochdale Railway Station and Rochdale Town Centre tram stops, just off of Drake Street.
Hardy Farm	Airport Line	Manchester	Chorlton-cum-Hardy	-	2016	Was to open between the current Barlow Moor Road and Sale Water Park tram stops, on the western end of Hardy Road in Chorlton.
Haveley	Airport Line	Manchester	Wythenshawe	-	2016	Was to open immediately east of the M56 after the Metrolink bridge over it near Martinscroft.
Hough End	Airport Line	Manchester	Wythenshawe	-	2016	-
Woodhouse Park	Airport Line	Manchester	Wythenshawe	-	2016	Was to open as the last stop before Manchester Airport, along Aviator Way.

== Platforms ==
Metrolink tram stops have between one and four platforms, though most (91) have two platforms. Some are island platforms allowing easier transfers between services.

Platforms	Stops
4	St Peter's Square, Victoria
3	Crumpsall, Deansgate-Castlefield, Shaw and Crompton
2	All other stops
1	Eccles, Navigation Road, Newton Heath and Moston

== See also ==
- List of fictional rapid transit stations
