= Proposed developments of Manchester Metrolink =

Development of Manchester Metrolink light rail system

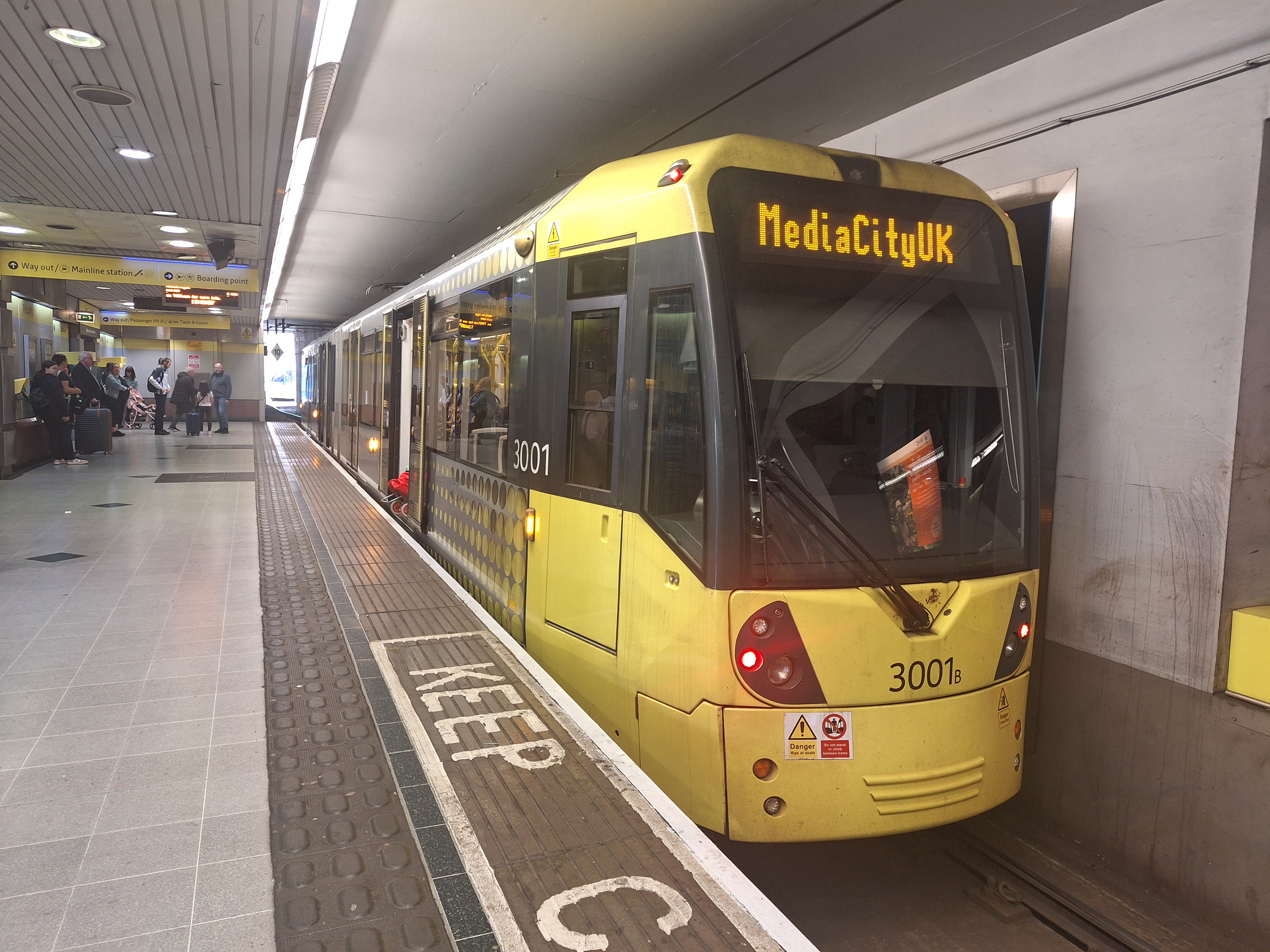
An existing Metrolink M5000 tram at Piccadilly.

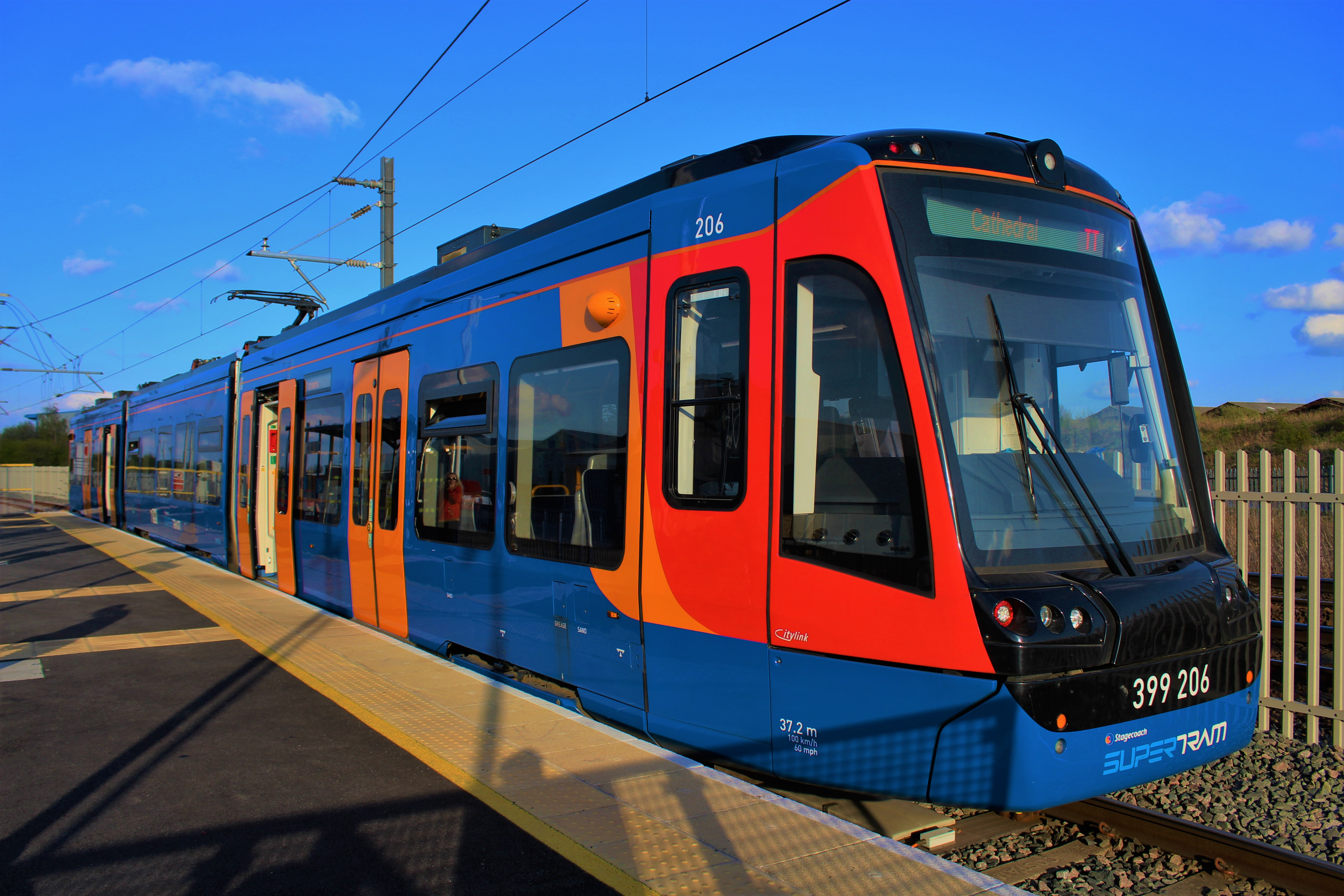
A class 399 tram-train vehicle in operation on the Sheffield Supertram network. The Greater Manchester Combined Authority is investigating the use of similar vehicles to extend services onto under-utilised heavy rail lines across Greater Manchester and beyond.

This is a list of confirmed or proposed future developments of the Manchester Metrolink light rail system in Greater Manchester, England.

== GM Transport Strategy 2040 Delivery Plan (2021–2026) ==
In January 2019, the Greater Manchester Combined Authority published a draft delivery plan detailing its transport priorities for the next five years. Contained within the document are options to extend some Metrolink lines as well as expansion of Metrolink-style services onto the local heavy rail network using tram-train vehicles. Following consultations, a revised draft delivery plan was published in January 2021, with the publishing of the final plan, subject to approval, in February.

=== Business cases to be completed within the next five years ===
- New Metrolink stops: Stops to serve new housing developments are proposed at Elton Reservoir and Sandhills on the Bury Line, and Cop Road on the Oldham and Rochdale Line.
- Airport Line extension to Terminal 2: A short extension of the Airport Line from the current Manchester Airport station to the site of the expanded Terminal 2.
- Airport Line extension to Davenport Green: An extension of the Airport Line from Roundthorn to the site of the proposed Manchester Airport High Speed station on the HS2 high speed network.
- Oldham–Heywood via Rochdale tram-train pathfinder: A tram-train service utilising the heavy rail Calder Valley line to connect Oldham to Heywood through Rochdale railway station.
- Manchester Airport–Wilmslow via Styal tram-train pathfinder: A tram-train service operating on the southern section of the heavy rail Styal Line between Manchester Airport and Wilmslow in Cheshire.
- South Manchester–Hale via Altrincham tram-train pathfinder: An extension of Metrolink's Altrincham Line using tram-train to reach Hale on the heavy rail Mid-Cheshire line.
- Improved Metrolink frequency between Piccadilly and Victoria stations: Increasing capacity to provide a direct service from Rochdale and Oldham to Manchester Piccadilly.
- Interventions to improve Metrolink capacity and reliability: Includes improvements to turnback facilities and double-tracking currently single-track sections.

=== Options to be further developed over the next five years ===
- Further interventions to improve Metrolink capacity and reliability: Includes longer vehicles, a third depot and double-tracking currently single-track sections.
- Manchester–Stalybridge extension: An extension of the East Manchester Line from Ashton-under-Lyne to Stalybridge.
- Manchester–Middleton extension: A proposed spur from the Bury Line connecting to the town of Middleton.
- Oldham–Middleton extension: A spur from Oldham to Middleton.
- MediaCityUK–Salford Crescent: A line connecting the MediaCityUK tram stop to the Salford Crescent railway station interchange. Further new Metrolink.
- Connections between Salford Crescent, Inner Salford and the City Centre: Extension of the MediaCityUK–Salford Crescent line into the regional centre.
- Completion of the Airport Line (Wythenshawe Loop): Completion of the Wythenshawe Loop by connecting the Metrolink lines between the Davenport Green and Manchester Airport Terminal 2 extensions.
- Port Salford/Salford Stadium extension: Extending the Trafford Park Line from the Trafford Centre to a proposed container terminal at Port Salford.
- Glossop tram-train: A tram-train service utilising the Glossop line between Manchester and Glossop in Derbyshire.
- Marple tram-train: A tram-train service utilising the Hope Valley Line branches north of Marple towards Manchester.
- Manchester–Wigan via Atherton tram-train: A tram-train service utilising the Atherton section of the Manchester–Southport line between Manchester and Wigan.
- Manchester–Warrington tram-train: A tram-train service utilising the southern route of the Liverpool–Manchester lines between Manchester and Warrington.
- Stockport–Hazel Grove tram-train: A tram-train service between Stockport and the suburb of Hazel Grove.
- Stockport–Manchester Airport tram-train: A tram-train service between Stockport and Manchester Airport.
- Rochdale–Bury via Heywood tram-train: Extension of the Oldham–Heywood tram-train pathfinder from Heywood to Bury.
- Manchester Airport–Mid Cheshire tram-train: A tram-train service from Manchester Airport using a proposed Western Link rail line to the Mid-Cheshire line.
- Stockport–Ashton via Denton and Reddish tram-train: A tram-train service utilising the Stockport–Stalybridge line from Stockport to Ashton.
- Cornbrook–Manchester Airport via Timperley tram-train: A tram-train service from Cornbrook using the Altrincham line to Timperley, the Mid Cheshire line to Baguley, then the Wythenshawe Loop to Manchester Airport.
- Regional centre metro tunnel: Providing capacity for more services on the network.

=== Projects to be investigated beyond the 5-year delivery plan ===
- Oldham–Greenfield via Grotton extension: A Metrolink spur from Oldham town centre to Greenfield railway station on the Huddersfield line.
- Oldham–Royton extension: A Metrolink spur from the Oldham and Rochdale line to the town of Royton.

== HS2 and NPR-related developments ==
As part of (now rejected) developments related to bringing High Speed 2 (HS2) and Northern Powerhouse Rail (NPR) to Manchester, High Speed Two Limited had proposed the present two-platform Piccadilly Metrolink stop at ground-level below the existing station platforms to be relocated. A new larger four-platform stop located underground below the Manchester Piccadilly High Speed station was planned to replace it. Provision for a second ground-level Metrolink stop at the eastern end of the high speed station to service future Metrolink extensions, to be called Piccadilly Central, also formed part of the plans. At the proposed Manchester Airport High Speed station provision for a new Metrolink stop — potentially serving an extension from the existing Airport line — was also envisaged.

== Previously proposed or suggested developments ==
=== Buckley Wells ===
Buckley Wells tram stop has been proposed to provide better passenger access in southern Bury, and would be on the Bury Line between Bury Interchange and Radcliffe tram stop.

=== Oldham extension ===
In January 2016, Jim McMahon, MP for Oldham West and Royton, proposed two loop extensions to the Metrolink system around Oldham:

- A spur from Westwood tram stop on the Oldham and Rochdale Line to Middleton town centre, then joining the Bury Line near Bowker Vale, in line with the proposed Middleton extension.
- The Ashton Loop, extending the line beyond Ashton town centre to Oldham Mumps.

Both would connect Rochdale to its neighbouring towns without the need to travel in and out of Manchester city centre. Initial high level feasibility work was undertaken by officials at Transport for Greater Manchester, which demonstrated the route is technically possible.

=== Salford expansion ===
In Salford City Council's 2004–2016 unitary development plan:

- Extending from Eccles Interchange along the A57 road to Barton-upon-Irwell and then across the Manchester Ship Canal to the Trafford Centre.
- Re-opening the Tyldesley Loopline from Eccles to Little Hulton via Walkden with Metrolink services.
- Tram-train between Manchester and Wigan via Salford, as proposed by the Regional Spatial Strategy for North West England.

In January 2019, it was revealed as part of a plan for new houses in Greater Manchester that the Metrolink would be extended to Salford Stadium.

=== Stockport tram-train strategy ===
In January 2015, Stockport Metropolitan Borough adopted a Rail Strategy proposing substantial conversion of current rail alignments around Stockport to tram-train operation, running into an interchange at Stockport bus station. These proposed services expand on, and are consistent with, those outlined in the TfGM tram-train strategy document. Earlier plans (now discarded) had envisaged the Metrolink line to East Didsbury being extended to Stockport along the Mersey Valley. The revised plan proposes instead a revised alignment for this link via Edgeley and Stockport railway station.

- Stockport town centre to Manchester city centre via Heaton Norris, Reddish South and Belle Vue (linking with the proposed Manchester – Marple tram-train line);
- Stockport town centre to Manchester Airport via Edgeley and Baguley;
- Stockport town centre to Altrincham via Edgeley and Baguley;
- Stockport town centre to East Didsbury (and on to Manchester city centre), via Edgeley and Gorsey Bank;
- Hazel Grove to East Didsbury via Gorsey Bank.

In the Rail Strategy, Stockport MBC also outline longer-term aspirations to establish tram-train services between Stockport town centre and Marple; and between Stockport town centre and Ashton town centre.
