= Hardy Farm tram stop =

Proposed Manchester Metrolink tram stop

Coordinates: 53.4303°N 2.2784°W

Hardy Farm

General information
- Location: Chorlton-cum-Hardy, City of Manchester; England
- System: Metrolink station
- Line: Manchester Airport Line

Other information
- Status: Proposed station

History
- Opened: N/A
- Opening: N/A
Route map
Location

Hardy Farm tram stop was a proposed future tram stop on the phase 3b plans to Manchester Airport, which would have been on the north side of Sale Water Park. It was due to open in 2016 but was dropped from the plans.

Preceding station	Manchester Metrolink	Following station
Under Construction
Sale Water Park towards Manchester Airport	Manchester Airport Line (proposed)	Barlow Moor Road towards Chorlton
