= Haveley tram stop =

Proposed tram stop in Manchester, England

Coordinates: 53°23′N 2°16′W

Haveley

General information
- Location: Wythenshawe, City of Manchester; England
- System: Metrolink station
- Line: Manchester Airport Line

Other information
- Status: Proposed station

History
- Opened: N/A
- Opening: N/A
Route map
Location

Haveley tram stop was a proposed tram stop on the Manchester Metrolink's Phase 3b expansion plans to Manchester Airport. It would have been located immediately east of the M56 motorway. It was originally due to open in 2016 but was dropped from the plans.

Preceding station	Manchester Metrolink	Following station
Benchill towards Manchester Airport	Manchester Airport Line (proposed)	Martinscroft towards Chorlton
