= Hough End tram stop =

Proposed Manchester Metrolink tram stop

Coordinates: 53.4376°N 2.2621°W

Hough End

General information
- Location: Chorlton-cum-Hardy, City of Manchester; England
- System: Metrolink station
- Line: Manchester Airport Line

Other information
- Status: Proposed station

History
- Opened: N/A
- Opening: N/A
Route map
Location

Hough End tram stop was a proposed tram stop on the phase 3b plans to Manchester Airport. It was originally due to open in 2016 but was dropped from the plans.

Preceding station	Manchester Metrolink	Following station
Under Construction
Barlow Moor Road towards Manchester Airport	Manchester Airport Line (proposed)	St Werburgh's Road towards Chorlton
