= Woodhouse Park tram stop =

Proposed tram stop in Greater Manchester, England

Coordinates: 53°22′N 2°16′W

Woodhouse Park

General information
- Location: Wythenshawe, City of Manchester; England
- System: Metrolink station
- Line: Manchester Airport Line

Other information
- Status: Proposed station

History
- Opened: N/A
- Opening: N/A
Route map
Location

Woodhouse Park tram stop was a proposed Metrolink tram stop on the phase 3b plans to Manchester Airport. It was due to open in 2016 but was dropped from plans. The tram stop would have served the Woodhouse Park area of Wythenshawe in Greater Manchester.

| Preceding station | Manchester Metrolink | Following station |
Under Construction
| Manchester Airport Terminus | Manchester Airport Line (proposed) | Shadowmoss towards Chorlton |
