= Manchester Airport High Speed station =

Planned HS2 railway station

Manchester Interchange
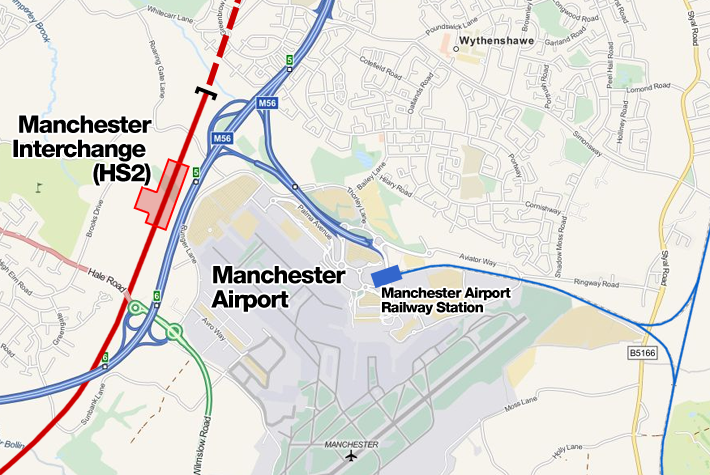
- Location of the proposed station

General information
- Location: Davenport Green, Trafford; England
- Coordinates: 53.3708°N 2.2941°W
- Transit authority: Transport for Greater Manchester
- Platforms: 4

Other information
- Classification: DfT category TBC
Location

Manchester Airport High Speed Station is a planned Northern Powerhouse Rail and High Speed 2 station at Manchester Airport, on the southern boundary of Manchester, England, next to Junction 5 of the M56 motorway on the northern side of the airport 700 metres (2,300 ft) north-west of Terminal 2. In 2023 plans to build the HS2 line to Manchester were dropped. In 2026 plans to build the Northern Powerhouse rail were confirmed in the King’s Speech.

== Proposal ==
Manchester Airport is the busiest airport in the UK outside London and offers more destinations than any other British airport. An airport station was recommended by local authorities during the consultation stage. The government agreed in January 2013 for an airport station, but only on the basis that private investment was involved, such as funding from the Manchester Airports Group to build the station. The government approved the scheme in November 2016.

In 2020, revised plans were released that saw the number of platforms increased from two to four.

The proposed HS2 connection to the station was officially abandoned when the United Kingdom government under Prime Minister Rishi Sunak and chancellor Jeremy Hunt announced the cancellation of the Manchester leg of High Speed 2 on 4 October 2023.

Had the HS2 connection been built, journey times from London Euston to Manchester Airport would have been estimated at between 59 minutes and 63 minutes, with Birmingham Airport just 28 minutes away. Additionally, the high speed service would have been less than 10 minutes from Manchester Piccadilly to the airport – down from 15 minutes at present on the congested Styal Line which is used by a mix of commuter, express and freight services and susceptible to delays. However, whilst the proposed station is closer to terminal 2 than the existing station, passengers using terminals 1 & 3 would be required to use the tram or a shuttle bus to get to the station from the airport.

== Metrolink tram stop ==
Manchester Interchange

General information
- Location: Davenport Green, Trafford; England
- Coordinates: 53.3708°N 2.2941°W
- System: Metrolink station

Other information
- Status: Proposed station
Location

Before the High Speed 2 connection was cancelled, extant proposals did not detail passenger interchange facilities, but indicated that various options were being considered to integrate the station with existing transport networks, including extending the Manchester Metrolink tram line to serve the HS2 station directly.

Transport for Greater Manchester had proposed that the Metrolink Airport Line — which currently terminates at Manchester Airport station — be extended via a new "western loop" around Wythenshawe. This proposed tram line which would cross the M56 motorway via the Thorley Lane Bridge, with an HS2 interchange stop at Davenport Green, before looping around via Wythenshawe Hospital. Local politicians have begun lobbying central government for political support for this extension scheme, which is currently unfunded.

Revised proposals published in 2020 include provision for an east-west tram line that serves this station.

== Services ==
Service proposals prior to the cancellation of the HS2 connection would have seen five trains per hour north to Manchester Piccadilly, three trains per hour south to Old Oak Common and London Euston (one service additionally calls at Birmingham Interchange), and two trains south to Birmingham Curzon Street.

The station is also planned to be an intermediate stop on the proposed Northern Powerhouse Rail line.

Future services
Birmingham Curzon Street or Birmingham Interchange or Old Oak Common	Avanti West Coast; High Speed 2	Manchester Piccadilly
Warrington Bank Quay	TBA; Northern Powerhouse Rail	Manchester Piccadilly
Preceding station	Manchester Metrolink	Following station
Davenport Green towards Cornbrook	Manchester Airport Line (proposed)	Newall Green towards Roundthorn
