= Crossacres tram stop =

Manchester Metrolink tram stop

Crossacres
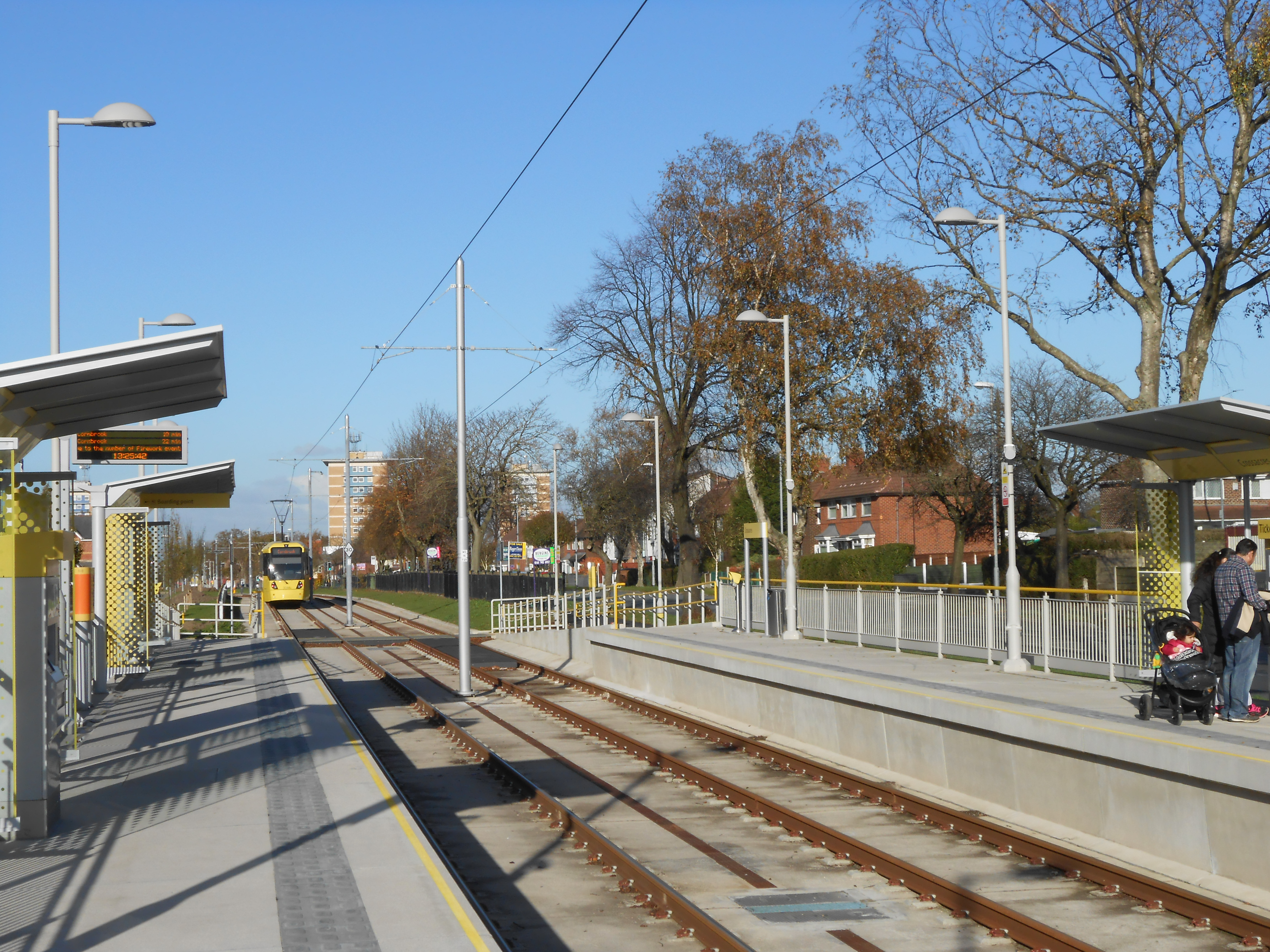
- Shortly after opening in November 2014

General information
- Location: Wythenshawe, Manchester; England
- Coordinates: 53.38334°N 2.25626°W
- System: Metrolink station
- Line: Airport Line
- Platforms: 2

Other information
- Status: In operation
- Fare zone: 4

History
- Opened: 2014
Route map
Location

Crossacres is a tram stop for the Phase 3B Extension of Greater Manchester's Metrolink system. The stop is part of the Airport Line and is at the junction of Brownley Road and Crossacres Road in the Wythenshawe area of Manchester, England. It opened on 3 November 2014.

== Services ==
Trams run every 12 minutes north to Victoria and south to Manchester Airport.

Preceding station	Manchester Metrolink	Following station
Wythenshawe Town Centre towards Manchester Airport	Manchester Airport–Victoria	Benchill towards Victoria

=== Ticket zones ===
Crossacres stop is located in Metrolink ticket zone 4.
