= Newall Green tram stop =

Proposed tram stop in Newall Green, Greater Manchester

Newall Green

General information
- Location: Newall Green, Manchester; England
- Coordinates: 53.3867°N 2.2902°W
- System: Metrolink station
- Platforms: 2 (Assumed)

Other information
- Status: Proposed station
Location

Newall Green is a proposed tram stop in Newall Green, Greater Manchester. It would serve the area of Newall Green. It has been proposed since the early 2000s but was dropped in 2005 from the Manchester Airport Line on cost grounds.

Preceding station	Manchester Metrolink	Following station
Manchester Interchange towards Cornbrook	Manchester Airport Line (proposed)	Wythenshawe Hospital towards Roundthorn
