= Wythenshawe Park tram stop =

Manchester Metrolink tram stop

Wythenshawe Park
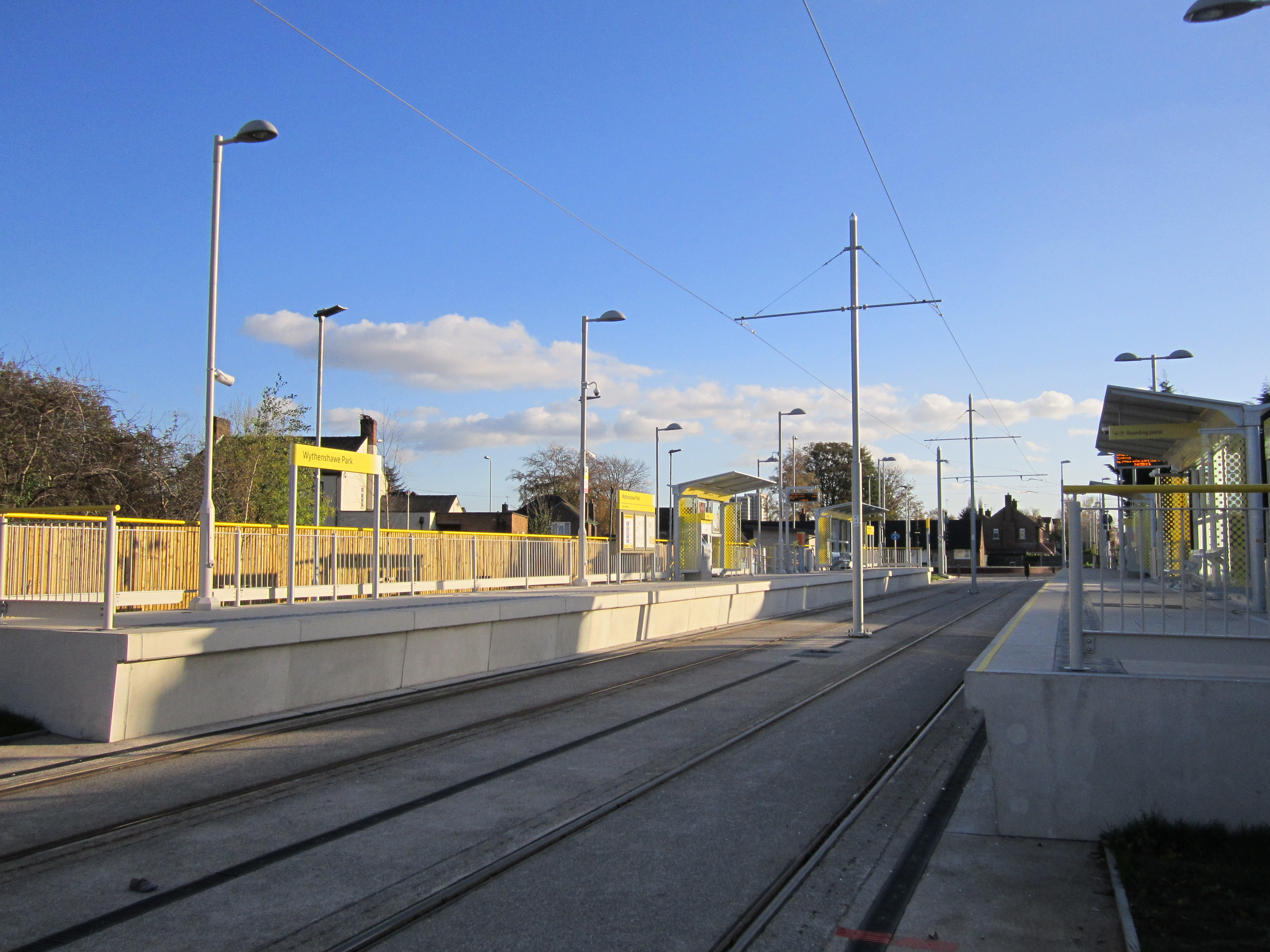

General information
- Location: Wythenshawe, Manchester; England
- Coordinates: 53.40771°N 2.29569°W
- System: Metrolink station
- Line: Manchester Airport Line
- Platforms: 2

Other information
- Status: In operation
- Fare zone: 3

History
- Opened: 2014
Route map
Location

Wythenshawe Park is a tram stop for Phase 3b of the Manchester Metrolink. The station opened on 3 November 2014 and is on the Airport Line on Wythenshawe Road near the junction of Moor Road.

== Services ==
Trams run every 12 minutes north to Victoria and south to Manchester Airport.

Preceding station	Manchester Metrolink	Following station
Moor Road towards Manchester Airport	Manchester Airport–Victoria	Northern Moor towards Victoria

=== Ticket zones ===
Wythenshawe Park stop is located in Metrolink ticket zone 3.
