= Peel Hall tram stop =

Manchester Metrolink tram stop

Peel Hall
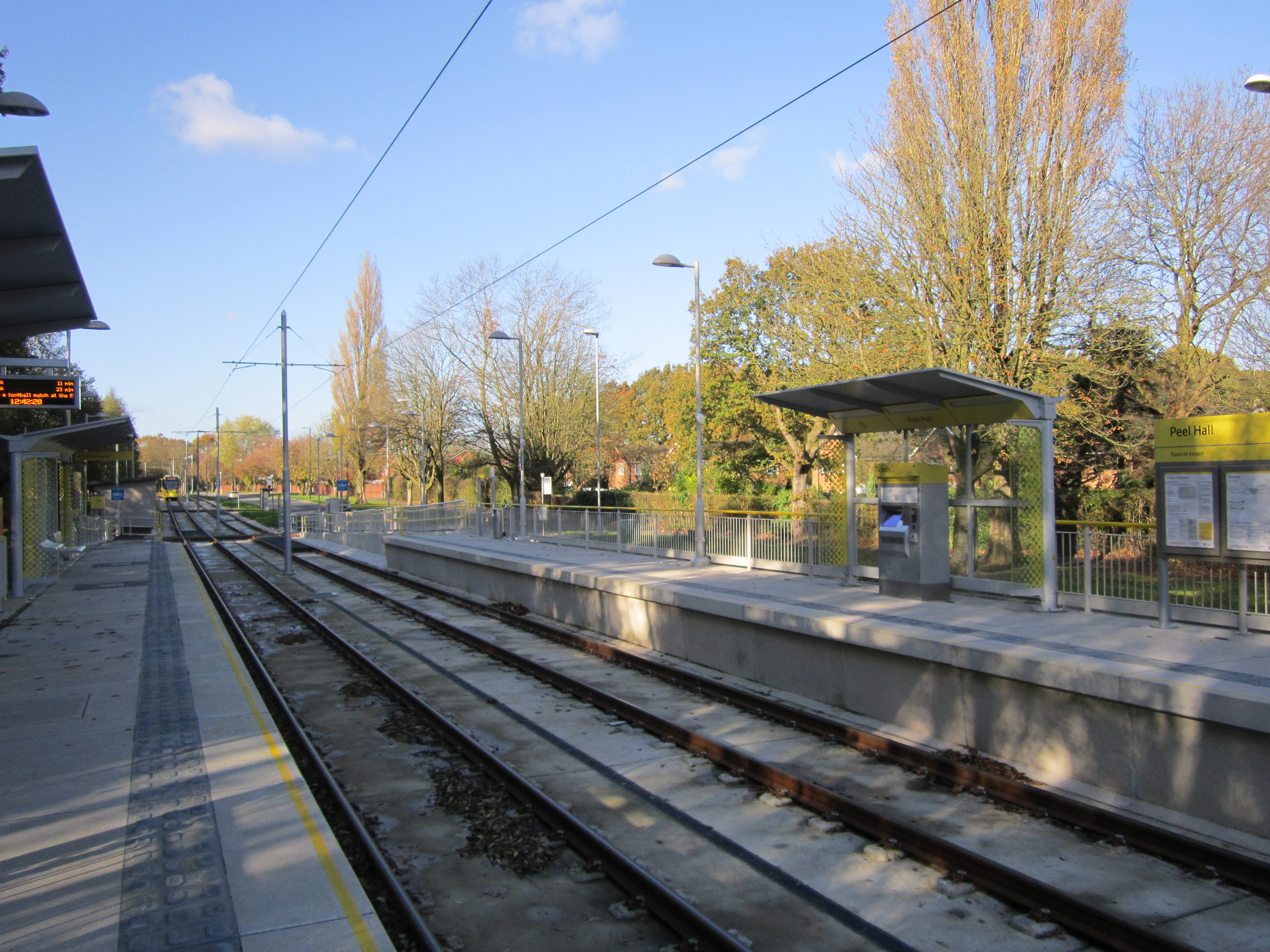

General information
- Location: Wythenshawe, City of Manchester; England
- Coordinates: 53.37375°N 2.25046°W
- System: Metrolink station
- Line: Airport Line
- Platforms: 2

Other information
- Status: In operation
- Fare zone: 4

History
- Opened: 2014
Route map
Location

Peel Hall is a tram stop for Phase 3b of the Manchester Metrolink. The station opened on 3 November 2014 and is on the Airport Line on Simonsway next to the junction of Peel Hall Road. The station serves the Peel Hall district of Wythenshawe, Manchester.

== Services ==
Trams run every 12 minutes north to Victoria and south to Manchester Airport.

Preceding station	Manchester Metrolink	Following station
Shadowmoss towards Manchester Airport	Manchester Airport–Victoria	Robinswood Road towards Victoria

=== Ticket zones ===
In January 2019, Metrolink ticketing was updated to use a zoned system, and Peel Hall was placed in zone 4.
