= Wythenshawe Hospital tram stop =

Proposed tram stop in Manchester, England

Wythenshawe Hospital

General information
- Location: Wythenshawe, Manchester; England
- Coordinates: 53.3867°N 2.2902°W
- System: Metrolink station
- Platforms: 2 (Assumed)

Other information
- Status: Proposed station
Location

Wythenshawe Hospital is a proposed tram stop in Wythenshawe, Greater Manchester. It would serve the hospital with the same name. It has been proposed since the early 2000s but was dropped in 2005 from the Manchester Airport Line on cost grounds.

Preceding station	Manchester Metrolink	Following station
Newall Green towards Cornbrook	Manchester Airport Line (proposed)	Roundthorn Terminus
