= Northern Moor tram stop =

Manchester Metrolink tram stop

Northern Moor
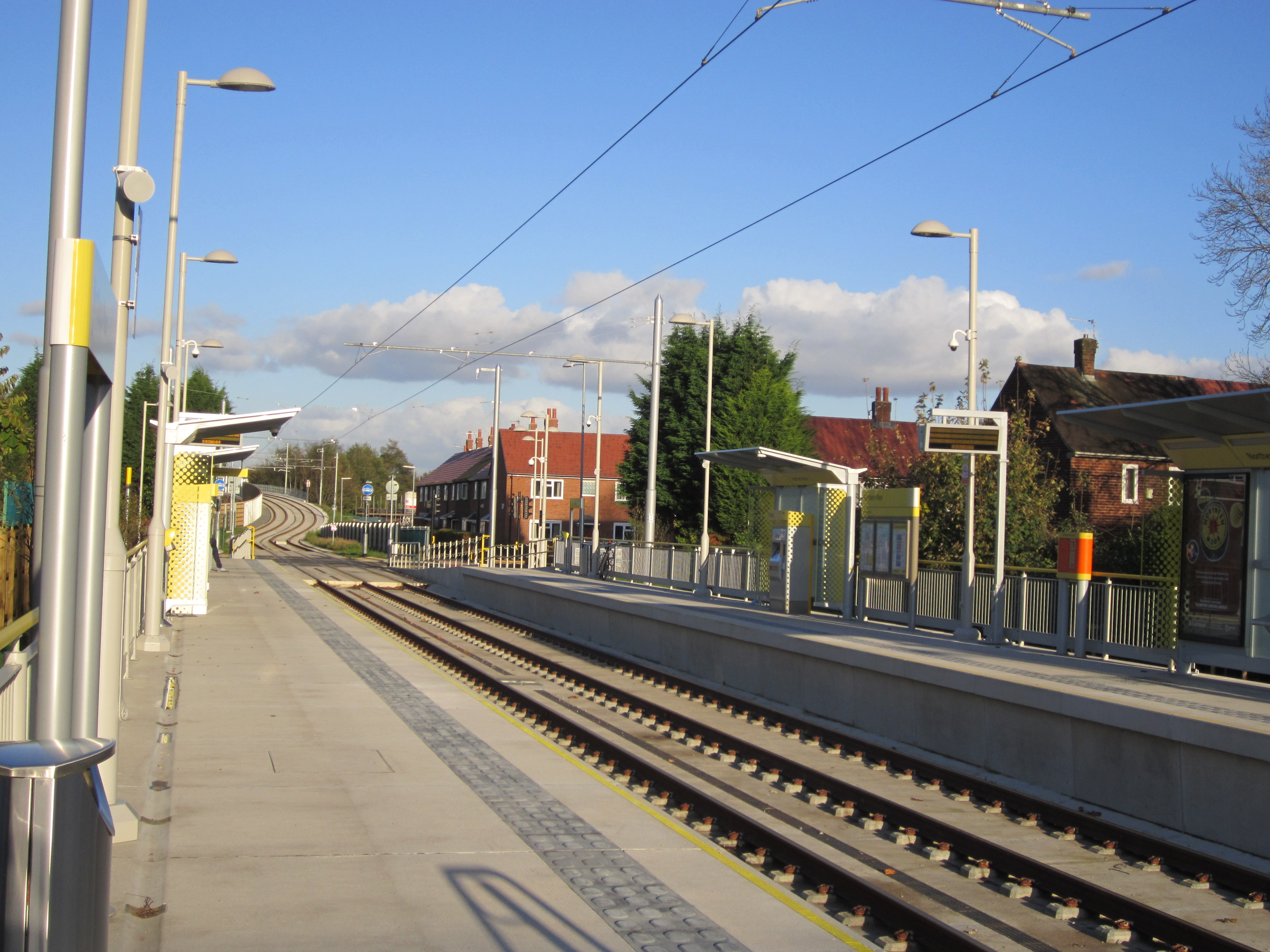

General information
- Location: Northern Moor, City of Manchester; England
- Coordinates: 53.41456°N 2.28815°W
- System: Metrolink station
- Line: Manchester Airport Line
- Platforms: 2

Other information
- Status: In operation
- Fare zone: 3

History
- Opened: 3 November 2014
Route map
Location

Northern Moor is a tram stop for Phase 3b of the Manchester Metrolink. It opened on 3 November 2014. and is on the Airport Line on Sale Road. The tram stop is on the Northern Moor / Sale Moor border.

== Services ==
Trams run every 12 minutes north to Victoria and south to Manchester Airport.

Preceding station	Manchester Metrolink	Following station
Wythenshawe Park towards Manchester Airport	Manchester Airport–Victoria	Sale Water Park towards Victoria

=== Ticket zones ===
Northern Moor is located in Metrolink ticket zone 3.

== Facilities ==
The tram stop has two ticket machines, one on each platform. There are eight seats on the platform, a bike rack on the Airport direction platform, but no parking is available.
