= Robinswood Road tram stop =

Manchester Metrolink tram stop

Robinswood Road
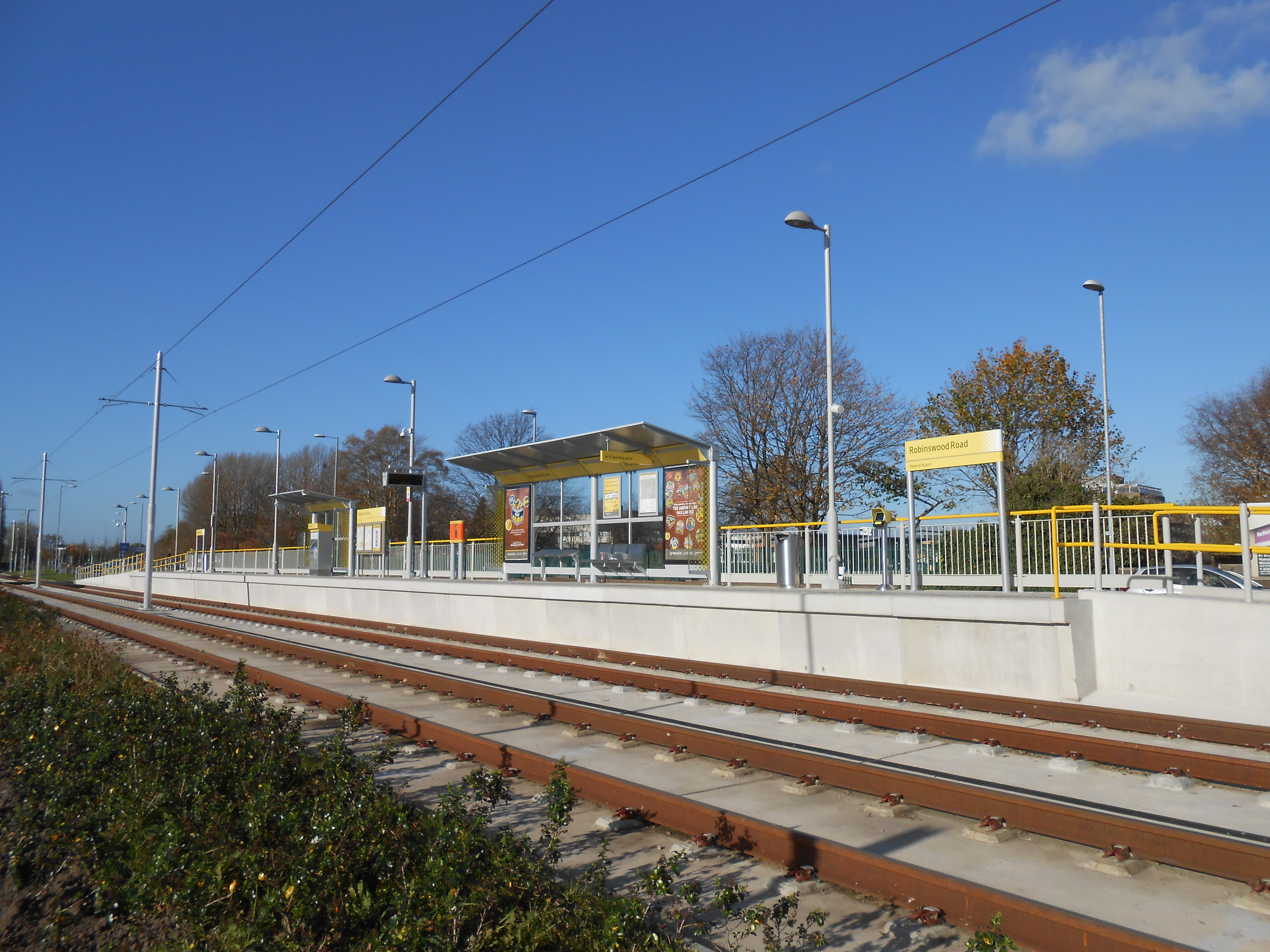

General information
- Location: Wythenshawe, City of Manchester; England
- Coordinates: 53.37639°N 2.25859°W
- System: Manchester Metrolink
- Operator: KeolisAmey
- Transit authority: Transport for Greater Manchester
- Line: Airport Line
- Platforms: 2
- Tram routes

Construction
- Structure type: At-grade
- Accessible: Yes

Other information
- Status: In operation
- Station code: -
- Fare zone: 4
- Website: Robinswood Road tram stop

History
- Opened: 3 November 2014; 11 years ago
Route map
Location

Robinswood Road is a tram stop for Phase 3b of the Manchester Metrolink. It opened on 3 November 2014. and is on the Airport Line on Simonsway at the junction of Brownley Road and Ruddpark Road, with Manchester Airport-bound services stopping to the left of the junction and Manchester-bound services stopping to the right. For a brief period during construction, it appeared the stop would simply be named "Robinswood". Its up and down platforms are staggered (one on each side of a side road) and not opposite each other.

== Services ==
Trams run every 12 minutes north to Manchester Victoria and south to Manchester Airport.

Preceding station	Manchester Metrolink	Following station
Peel Hall towards Manchester Airport	Manchester Airport–Victoria	Wythenshawe Town Centre towards Victoria

Page 25 of a 2010 Greater Manchester Integrated Transport Authority report for resolution deemed the stop as non essential.

The Robinswood stop site provides little additional catchment along Robinswood Road south of Simonsway, in addition to the catchment provided by the stops at Woodhouse Park, Peel Hall, Wythenshawe Town Centre and Shadowmoss. However, as noted above one of either Crossacres or Robinswood should be retained to maintain access for the Brownley Road properties. 26 2.13. The removal of either Crossacres or Robinswood stop would improve the value for money for the scheme as a whole and improve journey times without having a detrimental impact on the number of passengers.

It suggested a saving of £1.2 million could have been made by removing the stop from the scheme without any detriment to future income. The stop is within a couple of minutes walk of the Wythenshawe Town Centre stop and the Peel Hall stop.

The stop is one of the least used on the Metrolink network.

=== Ticket zones ===
Robinswood Road stop is located in Metrolink ticket zone 4.
