= Davenport Green tram stop =

Davenport Green

General information
- Location: Davenport Green, Trafford; England
- Coordinates: 53.3867°N 2.2902°W
- System: Metrolink station
- Platforms: 2 (Assumed)

Other information
- Status: Proposed station
Location

Davenport Green is a proposed tram stop in Davenport Green, Greater Manchester. It would serve the area of Davenport Green. It has been proposed since the early 2000s but was dropped in 2005 from the Manchester Airport Line on cost grounds.

Preceding station	Manchester Metrolink	Following station
Manchester Airport towards Cornbrook	Manchester Airport Line (proposed)	Manchester Interchange towards Roundthorn
