= Wythenshawe Town Centre tram stop =

Manchester Metrolink tram stop

Wythenshawe Town Centre
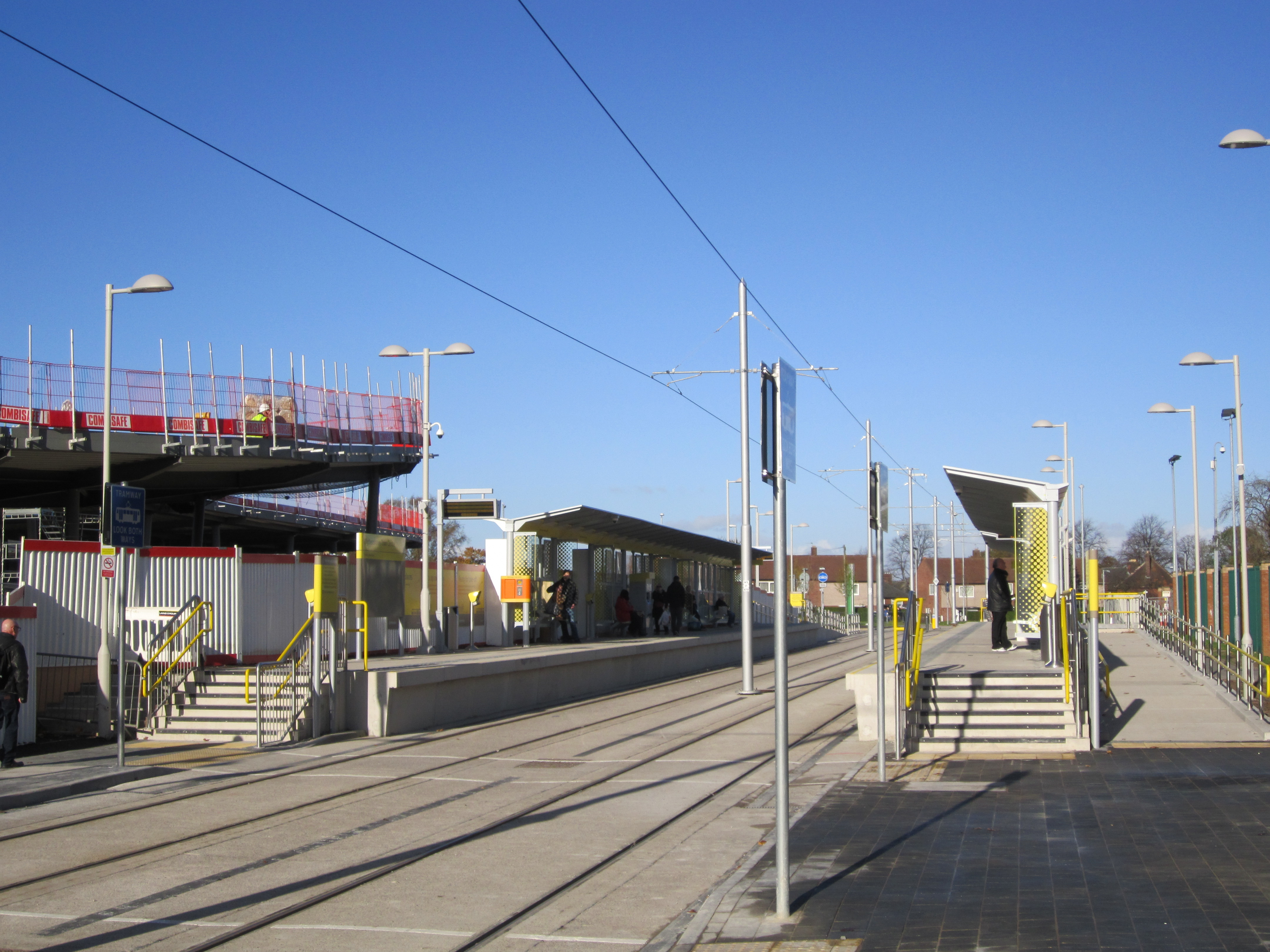

General information
- Location: Wythenshawe, City of Manchester; England
- Coordinates: 53.38013°N 2.26372°W
- System: Metrolink station
- Line: Airport Line
- Platforms: 2

Other information
- Status: In operation
- Fare zone: 4

History
- Opened: 3 November 2014
Route map
Location

Wythenshawe Town Centre is a tram stop on the Manchester Metrolink Airport Line. It opened on 3 November 2014. It is in Wythenshawe town centre next to shops, the library and Wythenshawe Forum. A new Wythenshawe bus station was built next to the Metrolink station, which replaced existing stops at the former bus station and Wythenshawe Forum.

== Services ==
Trams run every 12 minutes north to Manchester city centre and south to Manchester Airport.

Preceding station	Manchester Metrolink	Following station
Robinswood Road towards Manchester Airport	Manchester Airport–Victoria	Crossacres towards Victoria

=== Ticket zones ===
Wythenshawe Town Centre stop is located in Metrolink ticket zone 4.
