= Moor Road tram stop =

Manchester Metrolink tram stop

Moor Road
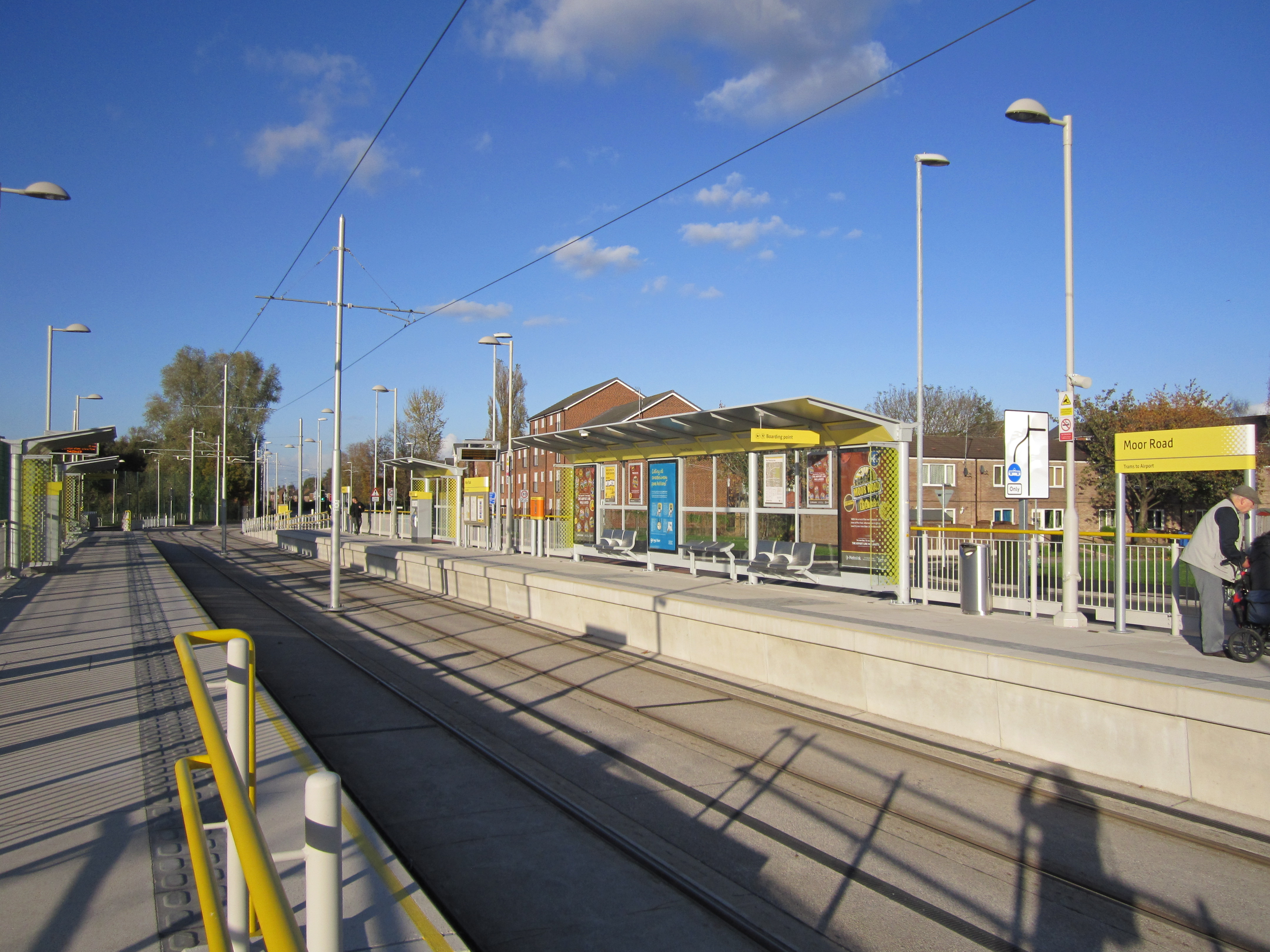

General information
- Location: Wythenshawe, City of Manchester; England
- Coordinates: 53.40333°N 2.29515°W
- System: Metrolink station
- Line: Manchester Airport Line
- Platforms: 2

Other information
- Status: In operation
- Fare zone: 3

History
- Opened: 3 November 2014
Route map
Location

Moor Road is a tram stop for Phase 3b of the Manchester Metrolink. It opened on 3 November 2014. and is on the Airport Line on Moor Road at the junction with Bideford Drive.

== Services ==
Trams run every 12 minutes north to Victoria and south to Manchester Airport.

Preceding station	Manchester Metrolink	Following station
Baguley towards Manchester Airport	Manchester Airport–Victoria	Wythenshawe Park towards Victoria

=== Ticket zones ===
Moor Road is located in Metrolink ticket zone 3.
