= Sale Water Park tram stop =

Manchester Metrolink tram stop

Sale Water Park
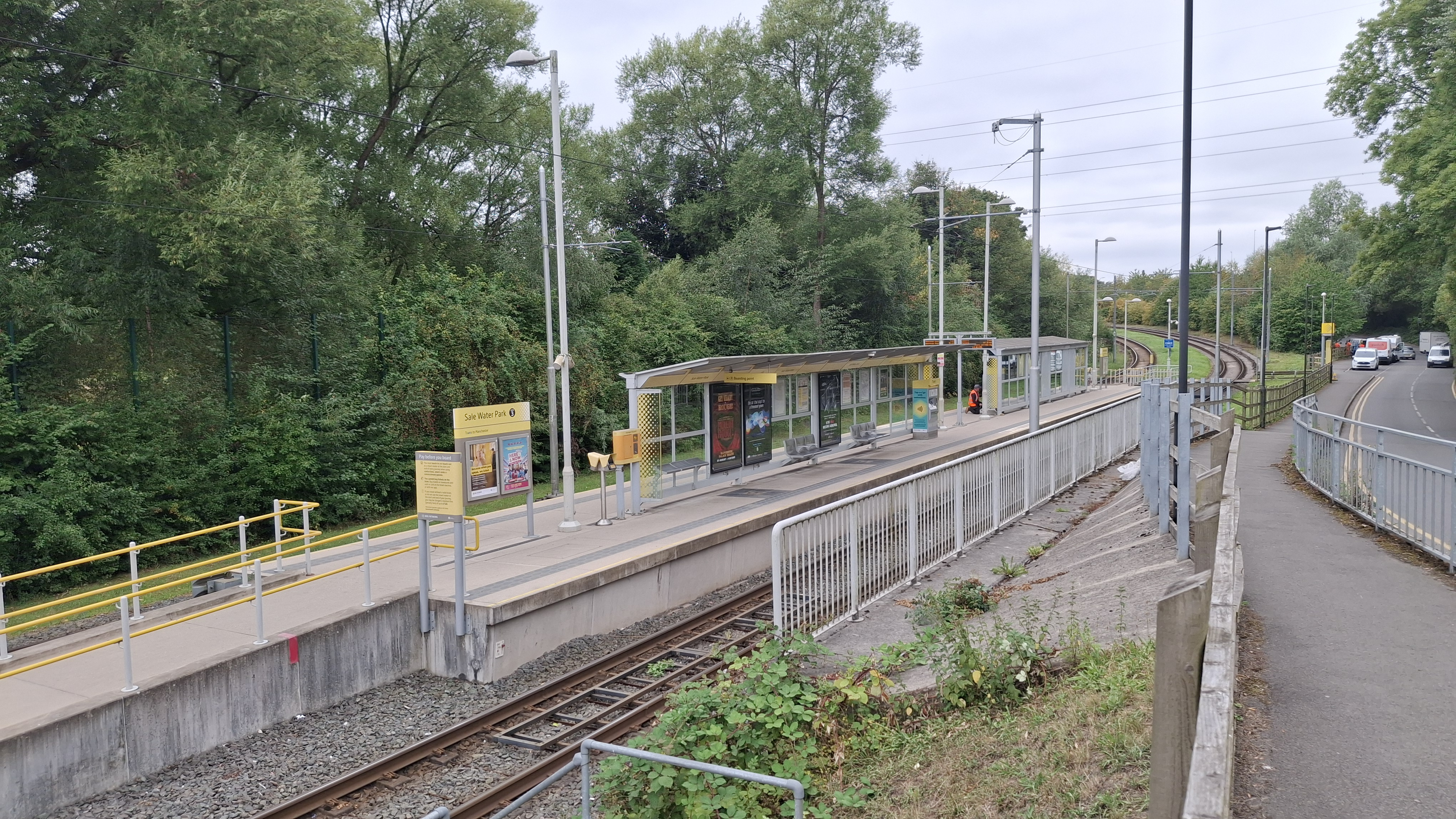
- Sale Water Park tram stop as seen from the Rifle Road roundabout in August 2025.

General information
- Location: Sale, Trafford; England
- Coordinates: 53.42825°N 2.29079°W
- Grid reference: SD807924
- System: Manchester Metrolink
- Operator: KeolisAmey
- Transit authority: Transport for Greater Manchester
- Line: Airport Line
- Platforms: 2 (island)
- Tram routes

Construction
- Structure type: At-grade
- Accessible: Yes

Other information
- Status: In operation
- Station code: -
- Fare zone: 3
- Website: Sale Water Park tram stop

History
- Opened: 3 November 2014; 11 years ago

Passengers
- 2019/20: ▲0.226 million
- 2020/21: ▼49,400
- 2021/22: ▲0.138 million
- 2022/23: ▲0.196 million
- 2023/24: ▲0.229 million
Route map
Location

Sale Water Park is a Manchester Metrolink tram stop in Sale, Trafford (Greater Manchester), close to the border with Chorlton which is in the City of Manchester. It is on the Airport Line and in fare zone 3. This stop was constructed and opened as part of Phase 3b of the network's expansion on 3 November 2014, and has step-free access.

The stop is located in what was previously an undeveloped woodland area near Sale Golf Club south of Rifle Road, which was cleared and graded for the Metrolink. The stop also has a 300-space car park which is free for Metrolink passengers. Despite this, the stop is one of the least used on the Metrolink network. This stop is a 10-minute walk away from its namesake, Sale Water Park. It also serves the Sale Moor area across the M60 motorway.

== History ==
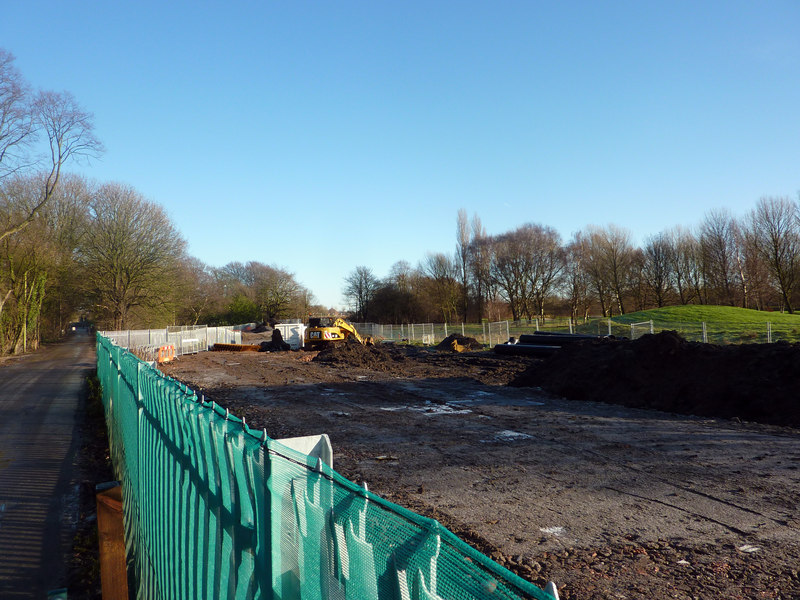
(18 December 2011) The site of the future tram stop has been cleared.

Phase 3b construction work started in March 2011, and at this time, trees were being cleared around this area and along the M60 for the tram stop and the surrounding track to be built. By the end of 2011, the area was cleared of trees, but track laying had not commenced by October 2012 according to Google Street View imagery.

On 23 June 2014, the first trams were tested on the Airport Line, possibly running past Sale Water Park. On 20 October, trams ran the full route all the way to Manchester Airport. The entire physical line between St Werburgh's Road and Manchester Airport opened on 3 November 2014, ahead of the anticipated 2016 opening.

== Layout ==
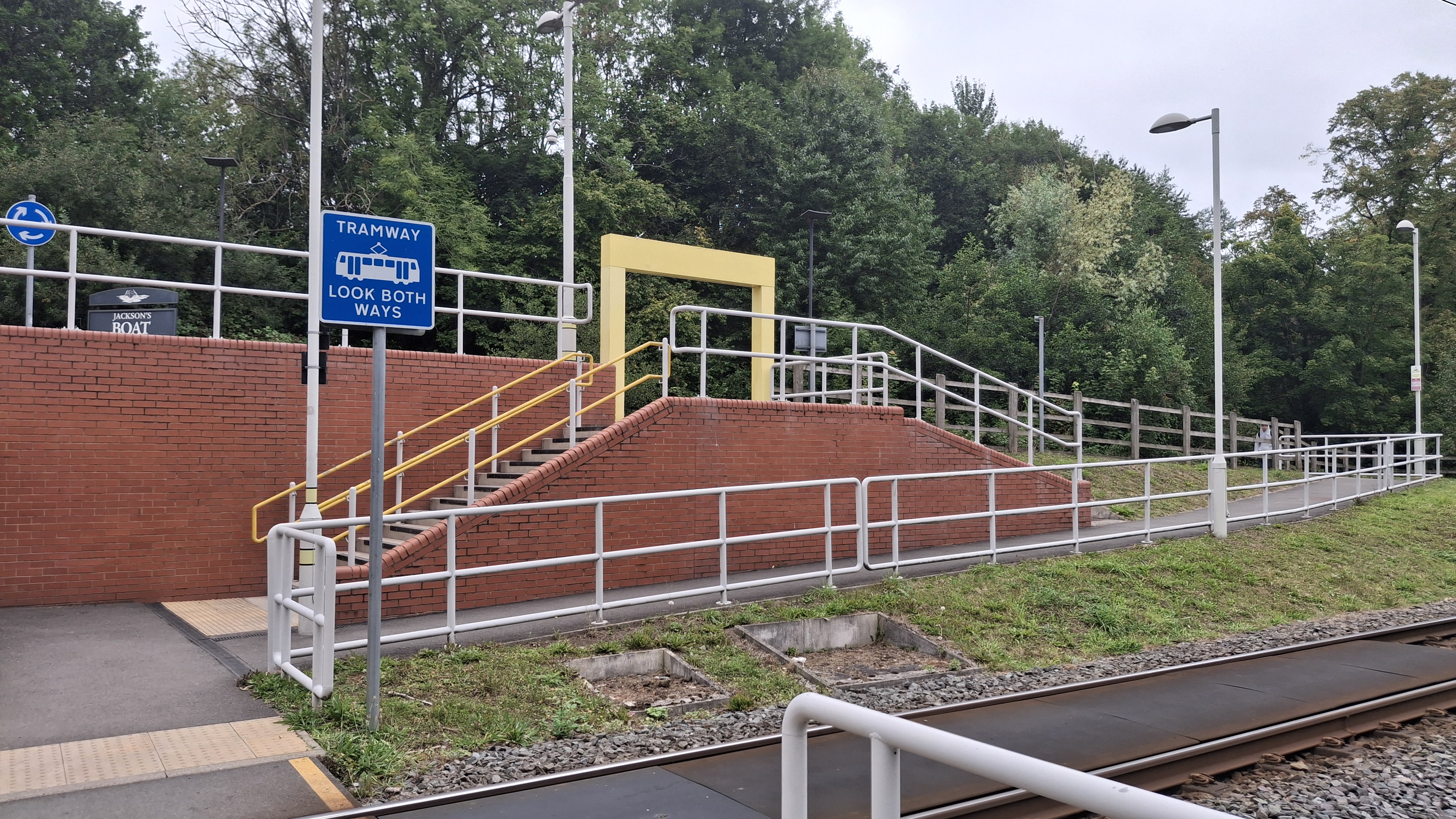
East entrance to the stop.

Sale Water Park tram stop has one island platform serving two tracks, and was constructed with accessibility in mind. There are two entrances to the station, both from Rifle Road: the west entrance only includes a track crossing and a step-free access ramp up to the platform. The east entrance has a step-free access route from Rifle Road, and steps down to track level, both leading to another track crossing and ramp up to the platform.

Two dot matrix passenger information displays stand at the centre of the station platforms serving one side each, and show estimated arrival times for trams in minutes up to 30 minutes prior (up to three at a time) and number of carriages.

There is a crossover track about 250 metres south of the stop to enable trams to terminate and turn around at Sale Water Park in any direction in case there is a disruption to normal service.

== Services ==
Every route across the Manchester Metrolink network operates to a 12-minute headway (5 tph) Monday–Saturday, and to a 15-minute headway (4 tph) on Sundays and bank holidays. Sections served by a second "peak only" route (unlike this stop) will have a combined headway of 6 minutes during peak times.

Sale Water Park is located in Zone 3, and the stop itself has two platforms in an island layout which aren't named. Trams towards Victoria via Market Street depart from the inbound platform (northernmost), and trams to Manchester Airport stop at the outbound platform (southernmost).

Preceding station	Manchester Metrolink	Following station
Northern Moor towards Manchester Airport	Manchester Airport–Victoria	Barlow Moor Road towards Victoria

== Incidents ==
- 30 July 2024: Police blocked a section of Rifle Road, the road running next to the tram tracks at Sale Water Park after concerns for the welfare of a man near the tracks. Tram services were stopped at around 14:30 BST.

== Transport connections ==
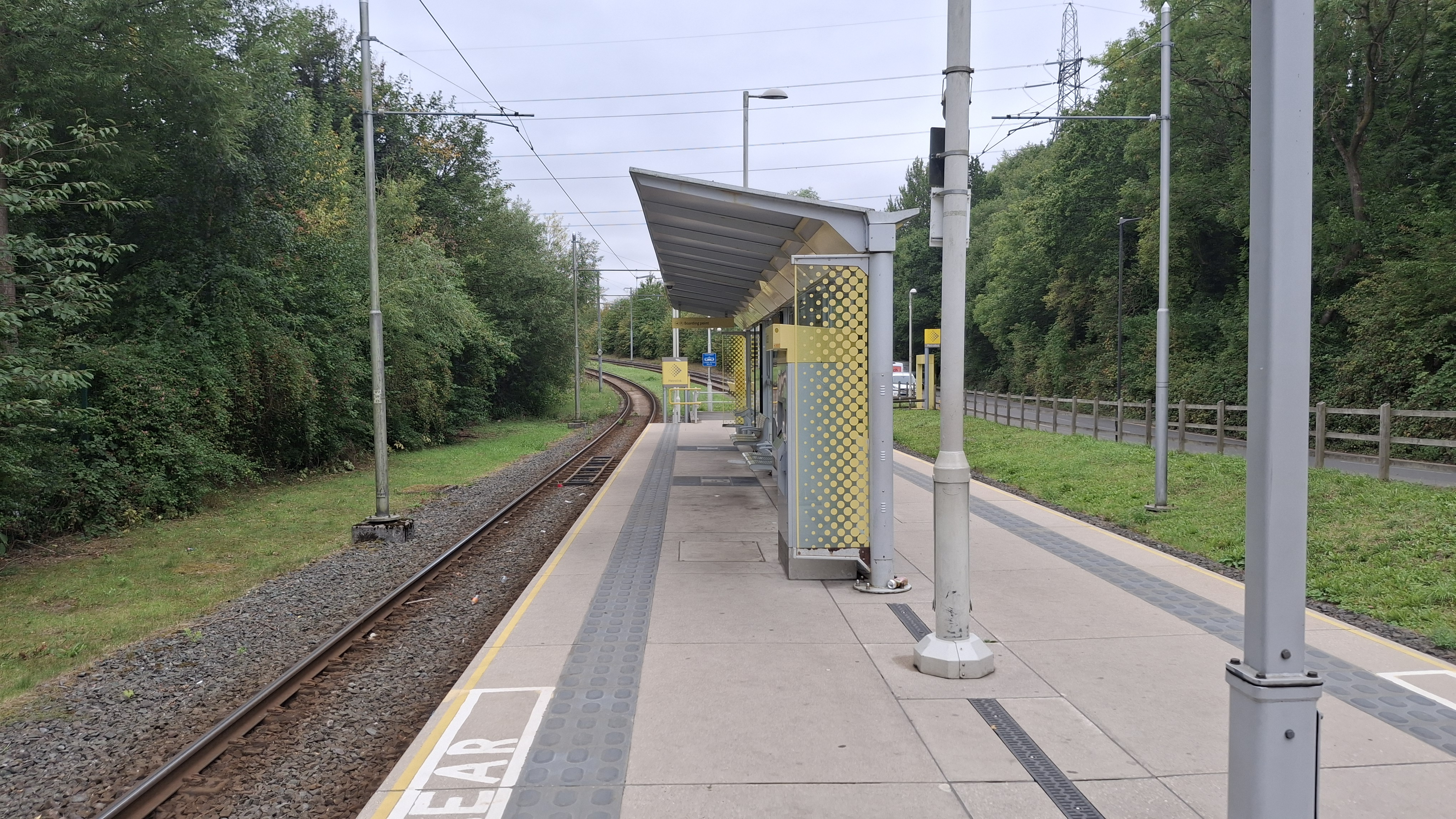
Sale Water Park from platform level.

=== Bus ===
Sale Water Park tram stop is served closest by bus route 248 (Eccles–Manchester Airport) on Old Hall Road, and 41 (Sale–Middleton) on Smedley Road.

=== Train ===
This tram stop is not connected to or near to any railway stations, but the nearest is Trafford Park, approximately 2.8 miles away walking.

== See also ==
- Sale Water Park
