= Shadowmoss tram stop =

Manchester Metrolink tram stop

Shadowmoss
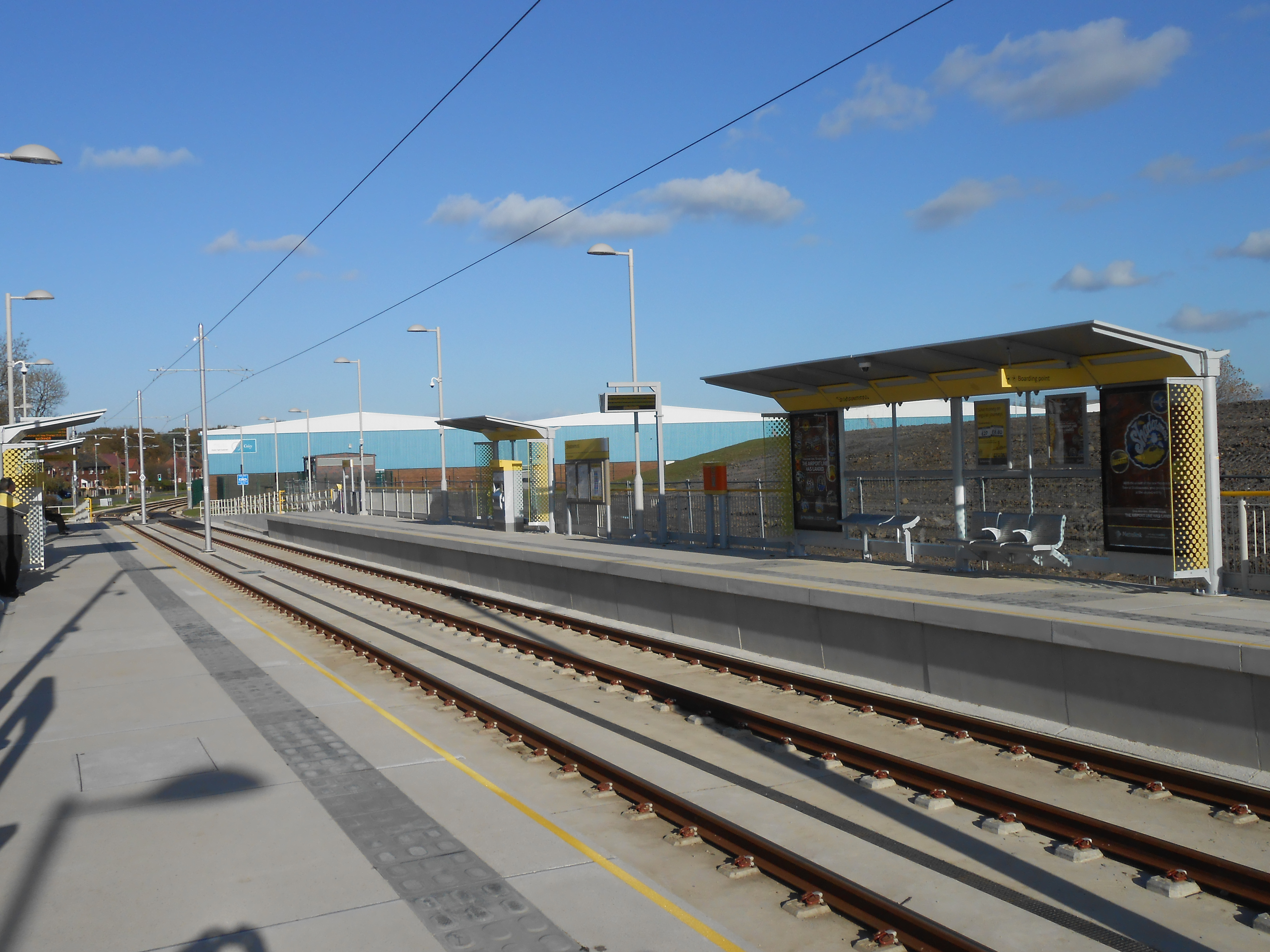

General information
- Location: Wythenshawe, Manchester; England
- Coordinates: 53.36802°N 2.25245°W
- System: Metrolink station
- Line: Airport Line
- Platforms: 2

Other information
- Status: In operation
- Fare zone: 4

History
- Original company: Manchester Metrolink

Key dates
- 3 November 2014: Opened
Route map
Location

Shadowmoss is a tram stop on the Airport Line of the Manchester Metrolink which opened on 3 November 2014.

The stop is one of the least used on the Metrolink network.

== Services ==
Trams run every 12 minutes north to Victoria and south to Manchester Airport.

Preceding station	Manchester Metrolink	Following station
Manchester Airport Terminus	Manchester Airport–Victoria	Peel Hall towards Victoria

=== Ticket zones ===
Shadowmoss stop is located in Metrolink ticket zone 4.
