= Benchill tram stop =

Manchester Metrolink tram stop

Benchill
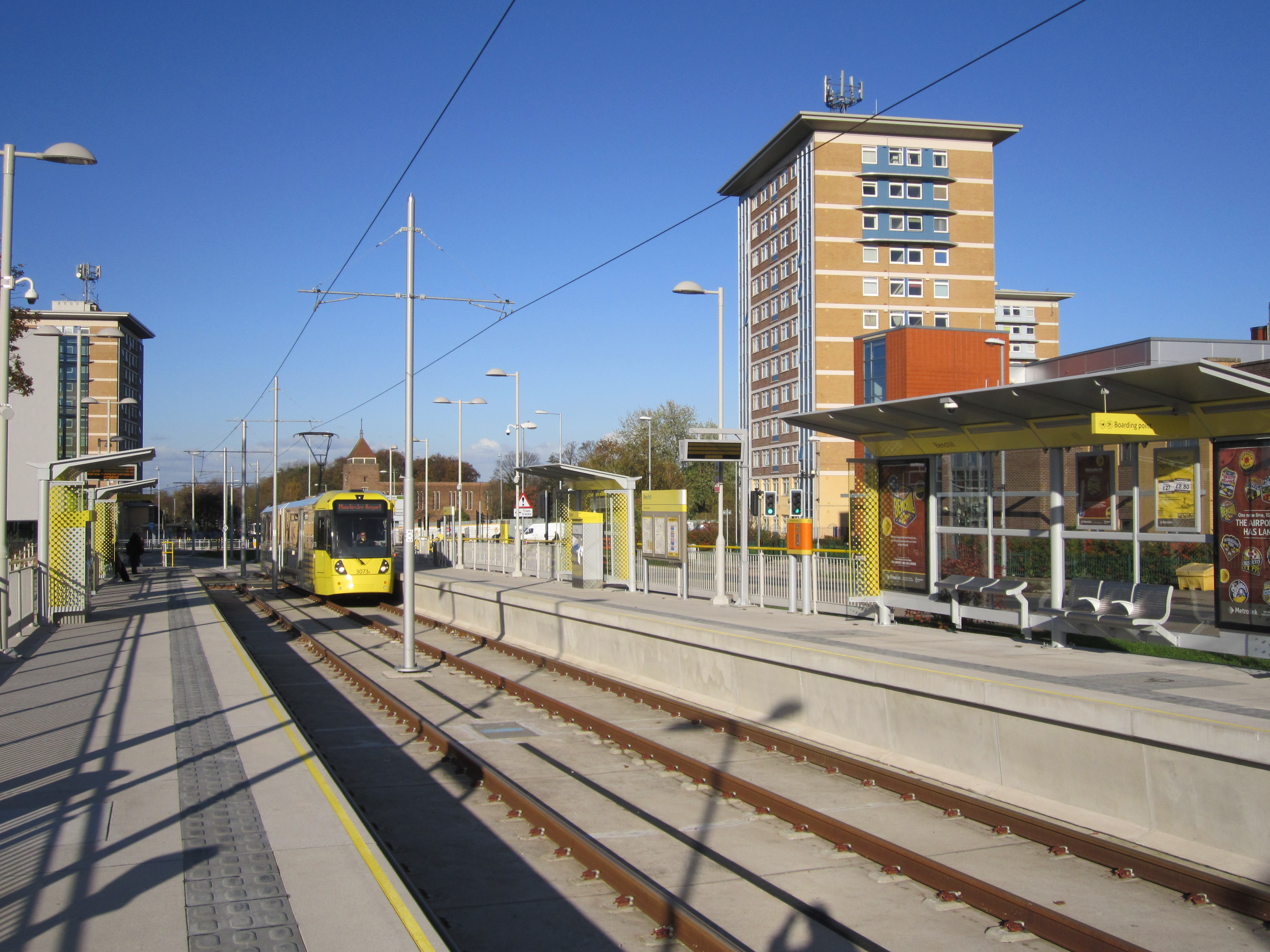
- A view of Benchill tram stop from the Manchester platform.

General information
- Location: Wythenshawe, City of Manchester; England
- Coordinates: 53.38716°N 2.25621°W
- System: Manchester Metrolink
- Operator: KeolisAmey
- Transit authority: Transport for Greater Manchester
- Line: Airport Line
- Platforms: 2
- Tram routes

Construction
- Structure type: At-grade
- Accessible: Yes

Other information
- Status: In operation
- Station code: BLL
- Fare zone: 4
- Website: Benchill tram stop

History
- Opened: 3 November 2014; 11 years ago
Route map
Location

Benchill is a Manchester Metrolink tram stop in Wythenshawe, Manchester. It is on the Airport Line and in fare zone 4. This stop was opened on 3 November 2014 as part of Phase 3b of the network's expansion and has step-free access.

The stop is located at street-level with the platforms parallel to Brownley Road and the tracks running alongside the road as far south as Crossacres, the next stop. It is also near to the Benchill Medical Practice (Brownley Green Medical Centre) and the Wythenshawe campus for The Manchester College.

== History ==
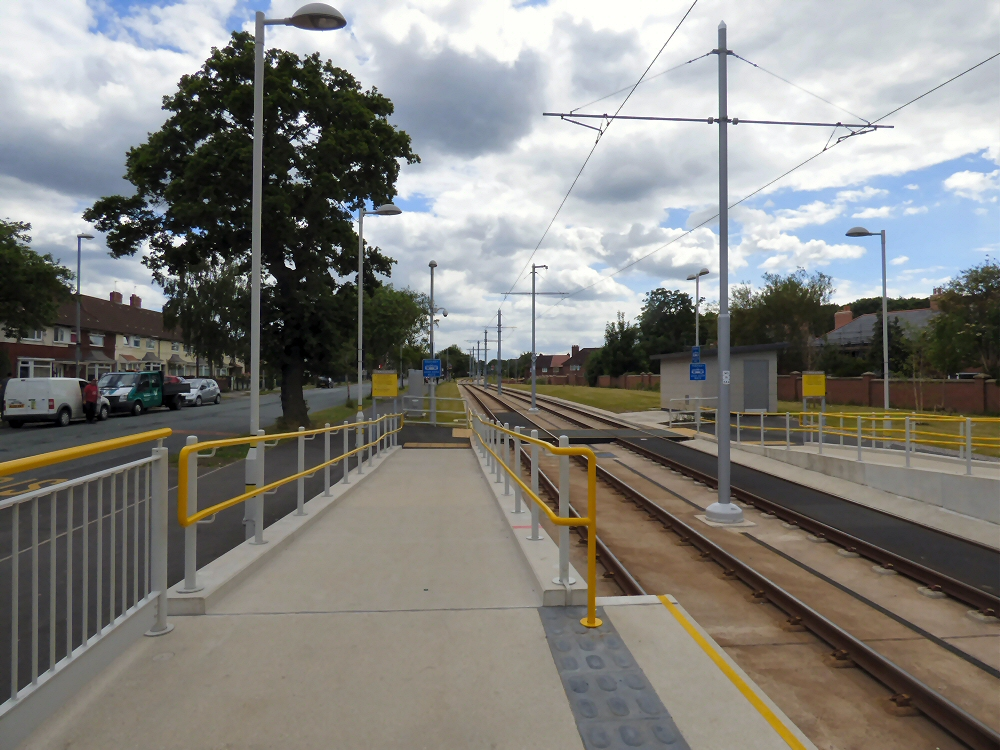
Disabled access ramp at the south end of Benchill's platforms.

Phase 3b involved the construction of a new 9-mile (14 km) Airport Line to Manchester Airport, plus other extensions across the Metrolink network. Construction work for all Phase 3b lines began in March 2011. Some infrastructure of Benchill tram stop including step-free access ramps were seen in October 2012 whilst the tram stop was being constructed. The Airport Line opened on 3 November 2014, when the first in-service tram ran through the stop heading towards Manchester Airport.

== Layout ==
Benchill tram stop was constructed with accessibility in mind. There are two step-free access ramps up to each platform and a set of stairs at the northern end of each platform. Two dot matrix passenger information displays stand one on each platform, and show estimated arrival times for trams in minutes up to 30 minutes prior (up to three at a time) and number of carriages.

== Services ==
Every route across the Manchester Metrolink network operates to a 12-minute headway (5 tph) Monday–Saturday, and to a 15-minute headway (4 tph) on Sundays and bank holidays. Sections served by a second "peak only" route (unlike this stop) will have a combined headway of 6 minutes during peak times.

Benchill is located in Zone 4 and the stop itself has two platforms. Trams towards Victoria via Market Street depart from the inbound platform (west), and trams to Manchester Airport stop at the outbound platform (east).

Preceding station	Manchester Metrolink	Following station
Crossacres towards Manchester Airport	Manchester Airport–Victoria	Martinscroft towards Victoria

== Journey time to Crossacres ==
The distance between Benchill and the next stop south, Crossacres, is about 430 metres. Though it is not the shortest distance between any two stops on the Metrolink system (that is Market Street and Piccadilly Gardens in Zone 1 at about 200 metres) it is the shortest timed journey across the network, at an average of 53 seconds. The fastest recorded time was 50 seconds in 2024.

The journey time is sometimes affected by the signals at the Woodend Road crossing between the two stops which sometimes take a few seconds to switch to proceed, limiting the driver's speed.

== Transport connections ==
=== Bus ===
This tram stop is served closest by bus route 11 (Altrincham–Stockport) on Hollyhedge Road, and 43 (Manchester Piccadilly Gardens–Manchester Airport) on Brownley Road.

=== Train ===
This tram stop is not connected to or near to any railway stations, but the nearest is Gatley, approximately 1.3 miles (2.1 km) away walking.
