= Martinscroft tram stop =

Manchester Metrolink tram stop

Martinscroft
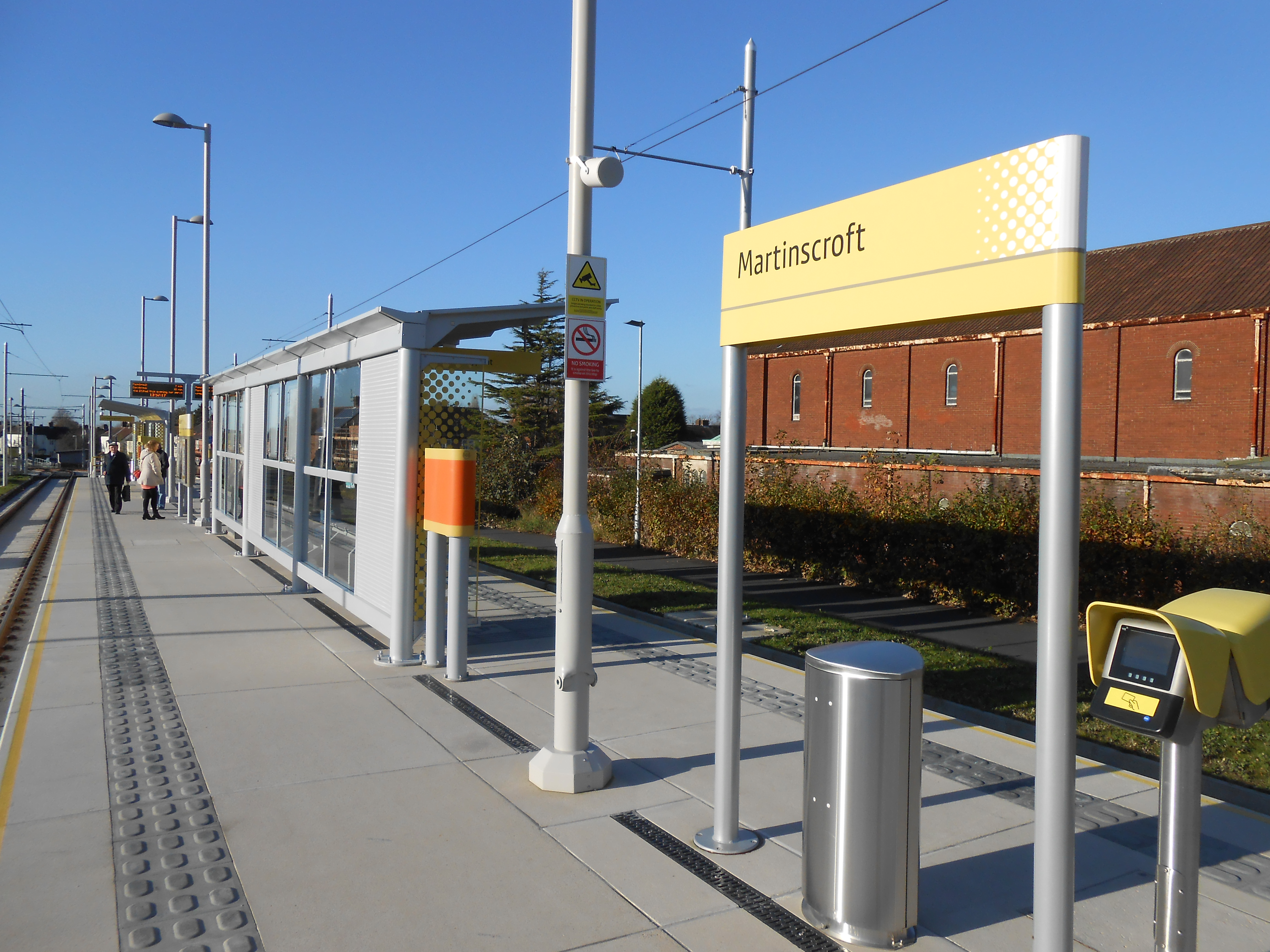

General information
- Location: Wythenshawe, City of Manchester; England
- Coordinates: 53.39188°N 2.27980°W
- System: Metrolink station
- Line: Manchester Airport Line
- Platforms: 2 (island)

Other information
- Status: In operation
- Fare zone: 4

History
- Opened: 3 November 2014
Route map
Location

Martinscroft is a tram stop for Phase 3b of the Manchester Metrolink in Greater Manchester, England. It opened on 3 November 2014 and is on the Airport Line on Hollyhedge Road next to St Martin's Church in Baguley, Wythenshawe.

== Services ==
Trams run every 12 minutes north to Victoria and south to Manchester Airport.

Preceding station	Manchester Metrolink	Following station
Benchill towards Manchester Airport	Manchester Airport–Victoria	Roundthorn towards Victoria

== Ticket zones ==
Since the ticket zone changes made by Transport for Greater Manchester in January 2019, Martinscroft is located in Zone 4 on the Metrolink fare zone scheme.
