= Baguley tram stop =

Manchester Metrolink tram stop

Baguley
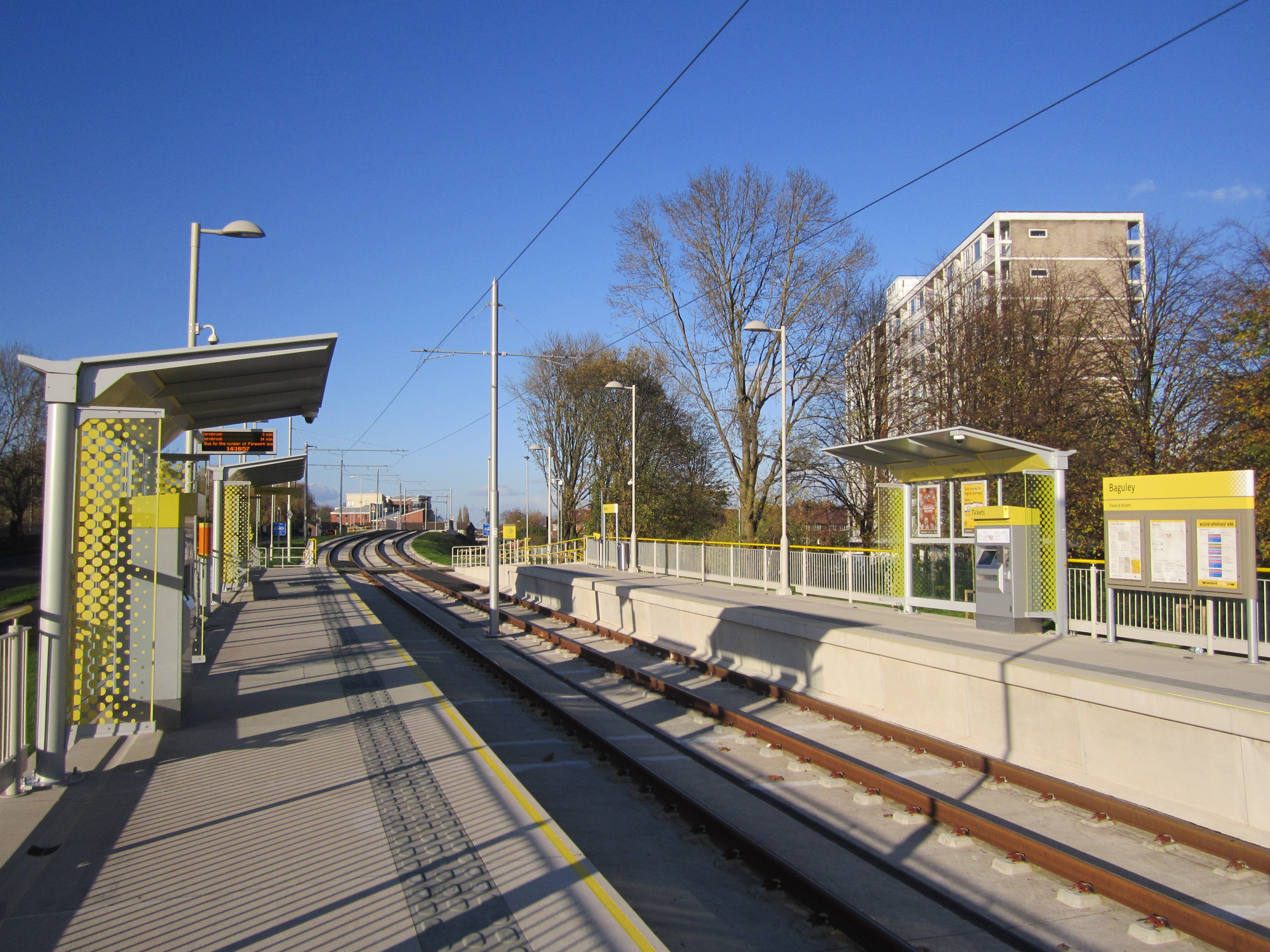

General information
- Location: Baguley, City of Manchester; England
- Coordinates: 53.39680°N 2.29264°W
- System: Metrolink station
- Line: Manchester Airport Line
- Platforms: 2

Other information
- Status: In operation
- Fare zone: 3

History
- Opened: 2014
Route map
Location

Baguley tram stop is a tram stop on the Airport Line, built for phase 3B of the Manchester Metrolink to Manchester Airport. It opened on 3 November 2014 and is on Southmoor Road next to Roundthorn Industrial Estate and a Tesco supermarket.

It is located near to the former Baguley railway station. It has long been proposed to reopen this station for an interchange.

== Services ==
=== Metrolink ===
Trams run every 12 minutes north to Victoria and south to Manchester Airport.

Preceding station	Manchester Metrolink	Following station
Roundthorn towards Manchester Airport	Manchester Airport–Victoria	Moor Road towards Victoria

=== Metrolink ticket zones ===
Baguley is located in Metrolink ticket zone 3.

=== Proposed Rail services ===
Trains are scheduled to run along the Stockport-Altrincham line between Manchester Piccadilly station and Chester, where trains currently run every hour in the off-peak period. However, additional trains are proposed between Greenbank and Stockport which could give Baguley 4 trains per hour.
