= Barlow Moor Road tram stop =

Manchester Metrolink tram stop

Barlow Moor Road
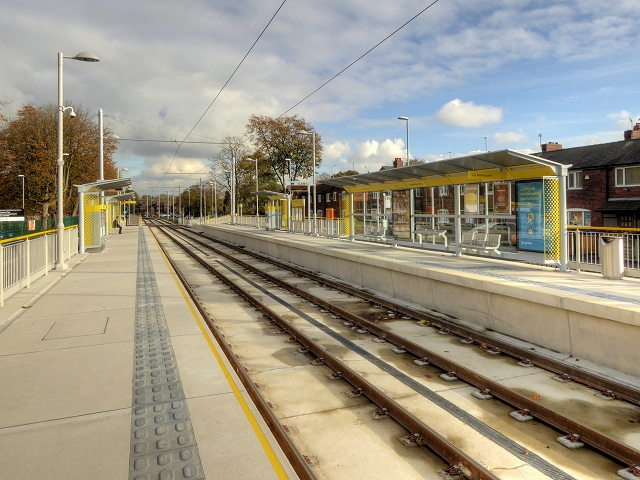

General information
- Location: Chorlton-cum-Hardy, City of Manchester; England
- Coordinates: 53.43287°N 2.26923°W
- System: Metrolink station
- Line: Manchester Airport Line
- Platforms: 2

Other information
- Status: In operation
- Fare zone: 2/3

History
- Original company: Manchester Metrolink

Key dates
- 3 November 2014: Opened

Services
Preceding station	Manchester Metrolink	Following station
Sale Water Park towards Manchester Airport	Manchester Airport–Victoria	St Werburgh's Road towards Victoria
Route map
Location

Barlow Moor Road is a tram stop on the Airport Line of the Manchester Metrolink. It opened on 3 November 2014. and is on the Airport line on Mauldeth Road West next to the junction of Barlow Moor Road.

== Services ==
Trams run every 12 minutes north to Victoria and south to Manchester Airport.
