= Airport Line (Manchester Metrolink) =

Manchester Metrolink line

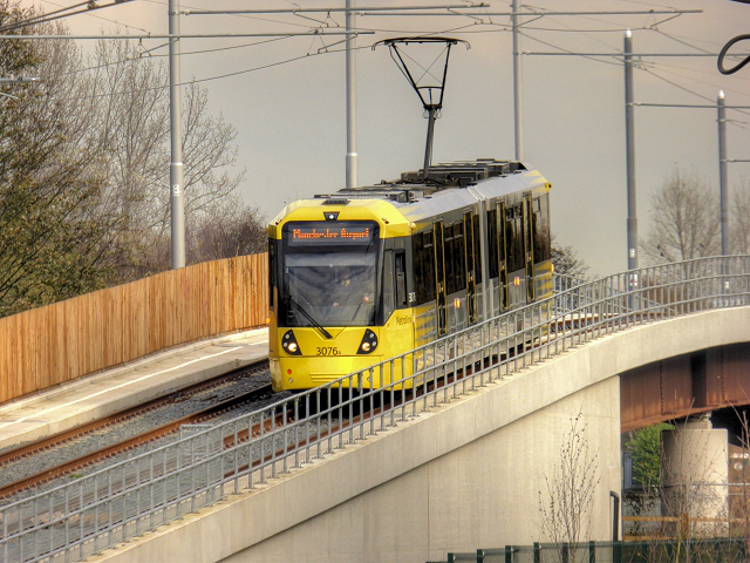
- A M5000 tram passing over the purpose built viaduct over the River Mersey on the Airport Line.

Overview
- Locale: South Manchester
- Termini: Manchester Victoria; Manchester Airport
- Stations: 15

Service
- Type: Tram/Light rail
- System: Manchester Metrolink
- Rolling stock: M5000

History
- Opened: 3 November 2014

Technical
- Line length: 9 miles (14.5 km)
- Character: Reserved track and street running
- Track gauge: 1,435 mm (4 ft 8 1/2 in) standard gauge
- Electrification: 750 volts DC overhead
- Operating speed: 50 mph (80km/h)

The Airport Line is a tram line of the Manchester Metrolink in Manchester, England, running from Manchester city centre to Manchester Airport via Wythenshawe. It opened in November 2014 as part of phase three of the system's expansion.

== Route ==
The line runs mostly on reserved track alignments with short sections of street–running. The southern half of the route mostly uses the wide grass verges alongside roads.

From Manchester city centre, the route is shared with the Altrincham Line as far as Trafford Bar, and then the South Manchester Line as far as St Werburgh's Road. The Airport Line proper starts at a junction just south of St Werburgh's Road stop, where the line leaves the former railway trackbed, and runs off to the south-west. It joins Mauldeth Road West, running along the central reservation to Barlow Moor Road stop. It then runs on street along Hardy Lane for a short distance, before crossing onto a tram only viaduct crossing the River Mersey and the Mersey Valley flood plain.

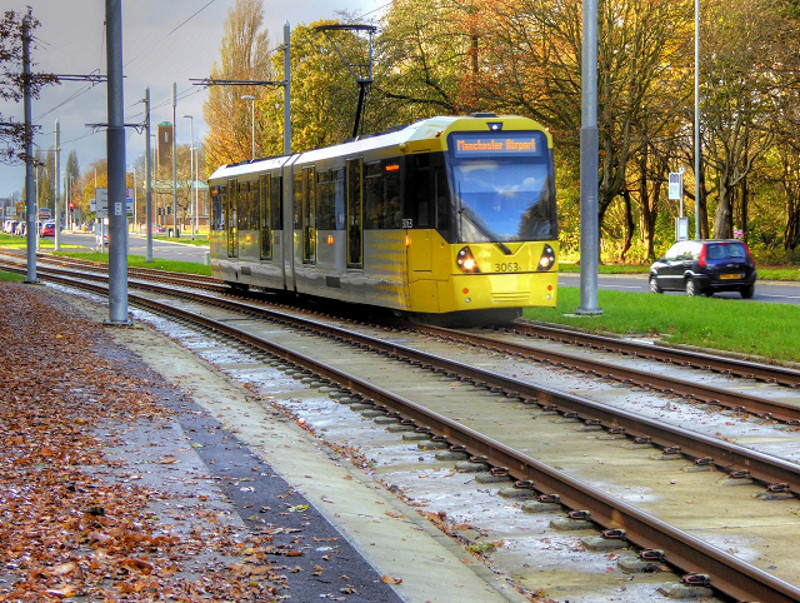
Tram running on tracks alongside Simonsway. Between Robinswood Road and Peel Hall.

The line then continues on a low embankment to Sale Water Park stop, serving the Sale Water Park; this stop is also near Junction 6 of the M60 motorway and has park and ride facilities. The line then runs parallel to the M60 for a short distance before crossing it on a tram only bridge, and turning south-west.

After crossing the motorway the line serves Northern Moor stop. Between Northern Moor and Wythenshawe Park the line runs on a strip of land which was originally reserved for a road scheme. The line then merges back onto the street on Moor Road, and pulls over to the side of the road to serve Moor Road stop, and after running along Southmoor Road for another few hundred metres, crosses onto a reserved track section alongside the road. A tram bridge takes the tracks over the Mid-Cheshire railway line and into Baguley stop. It then runs alongside the road on this reserved track section, serving a stop at Roundthorn, and taking a sharp turn right to get to Martinscroft, climbs over the M56 motorway on a purpose-built bridge.

The line merges onto Hollyhedge Road, mixing with other road traffic, before turning right onto a segregated section of track alongside Brownley Road, serving stops at Benchill and Crossacres. The route crosses to another segregated alignment on the south side of Poundswick Lane, crossing the northern end of Rowlandsway before turning left into Wythenshawe Town Centre stop.

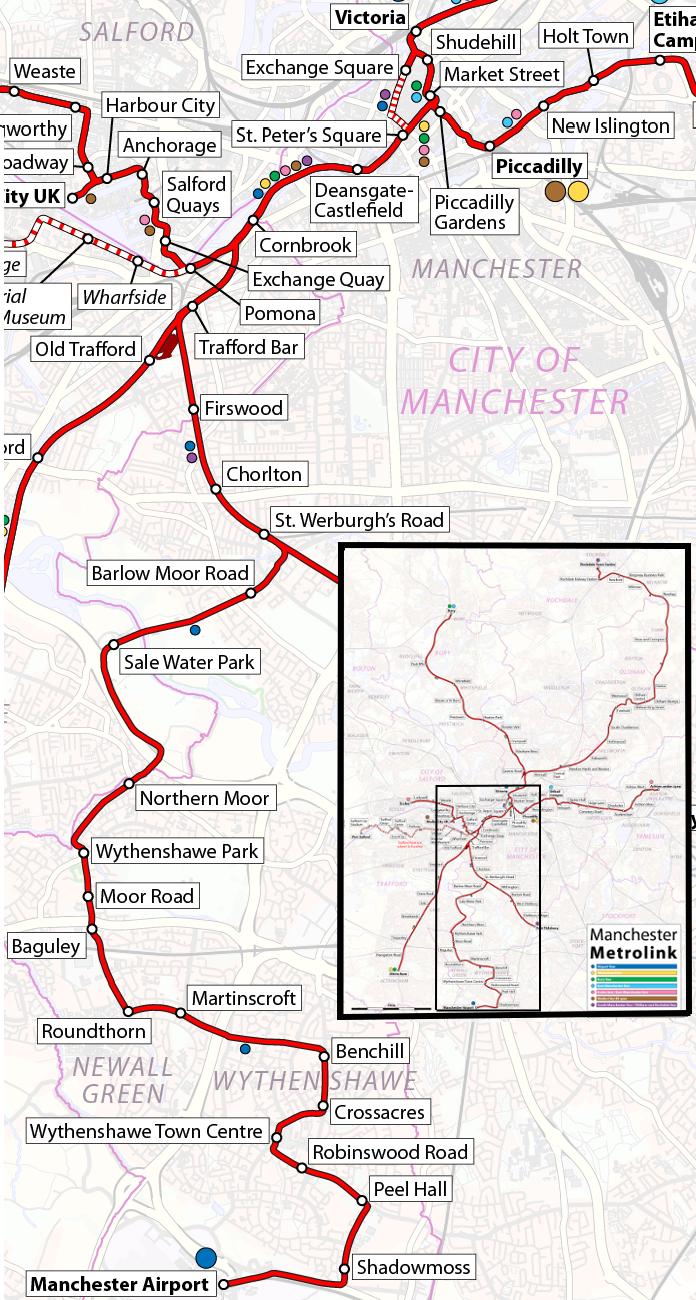
Map of the Airport Line

The line then runs along segregated roadside track sections, serving stops at Robinswood Road, Peel Hall and Shadowmoss, before passing under Ringway Road via an underpass, and into the terminus at Manchester Airport station: The two tram platforms at the Airport station were built alongside the mainline rail platforms allowing interchange between the trains and trams, though only one platform is in use as of 2024.

The total distance between St Werburgh's Road and Manchester Airport is 9 miles (14.5 km).

== History ==
The line was opened as part of the third phase of the system's development, which also included new lines to East Didsbury, Ashton-under-Lyne, and Rochdale.

Construction work for all Phase 3b lines began in March 2011. On the Airport Line, a 580-tonne steel bridge was erected in Wythenshawe over the M56 motorway on 25 November 2012. The Airport Line opened on 3 November 2014, more than one year early, and at a cost of £368 million.

== Proposed future development ==
=== Wythenshawe Loop ===
The original plans for the line included a loop from Roundthorn tram stop to the existing line at Manchester Airport via Wythenshawe Hospital and Newall Green. The line would have had stops at Wythenshawe Hospital, Newall Green and Davenport Green. Although axed in 2005 to control costs, the Wythenshawe Loop remains an aspiration of TfGM. The route could've been linked with HS2 Manchester Airport High Speed station.

TfGM have submitted a bid for funding to extend the Airport Line to Terminal 2.

=== Extension to Manchester Airport High Speed station ===
Plans for the (now cancelled) Manchester Airport High Speed station released in 2020 included provision for an east–west tram link. This would have seen the Airport Line extended to serve the new station.

== Services ==
As of January 2018, trams operate from Manchester Airport every 12 minutes, and terminate at Manchester Victoria in the City Zone. At opening, Airport Line services had terminated at Cornbrook and later Deansgate-Castlefield due to lack of capacity through the city-centre, which was remedied by the opening of the second city crossing. In March 2016, an early morning service was introduced between the airport and Firswood, which was in February 2017 also extended to Deansgate-Castlefield. TfGM have indicated that there could also be a 6-minute service at peak times after 2017.

== Usage ==
During the first full year of operation, 1.88 million journeys were made on the Airport Line.

== See also ==
- Styal Line; heavy-rail line also serving Manchester Airport.
