= Roundthorn tram stop =

Stop on the Manchester Metrolink, UK

Roundthorn
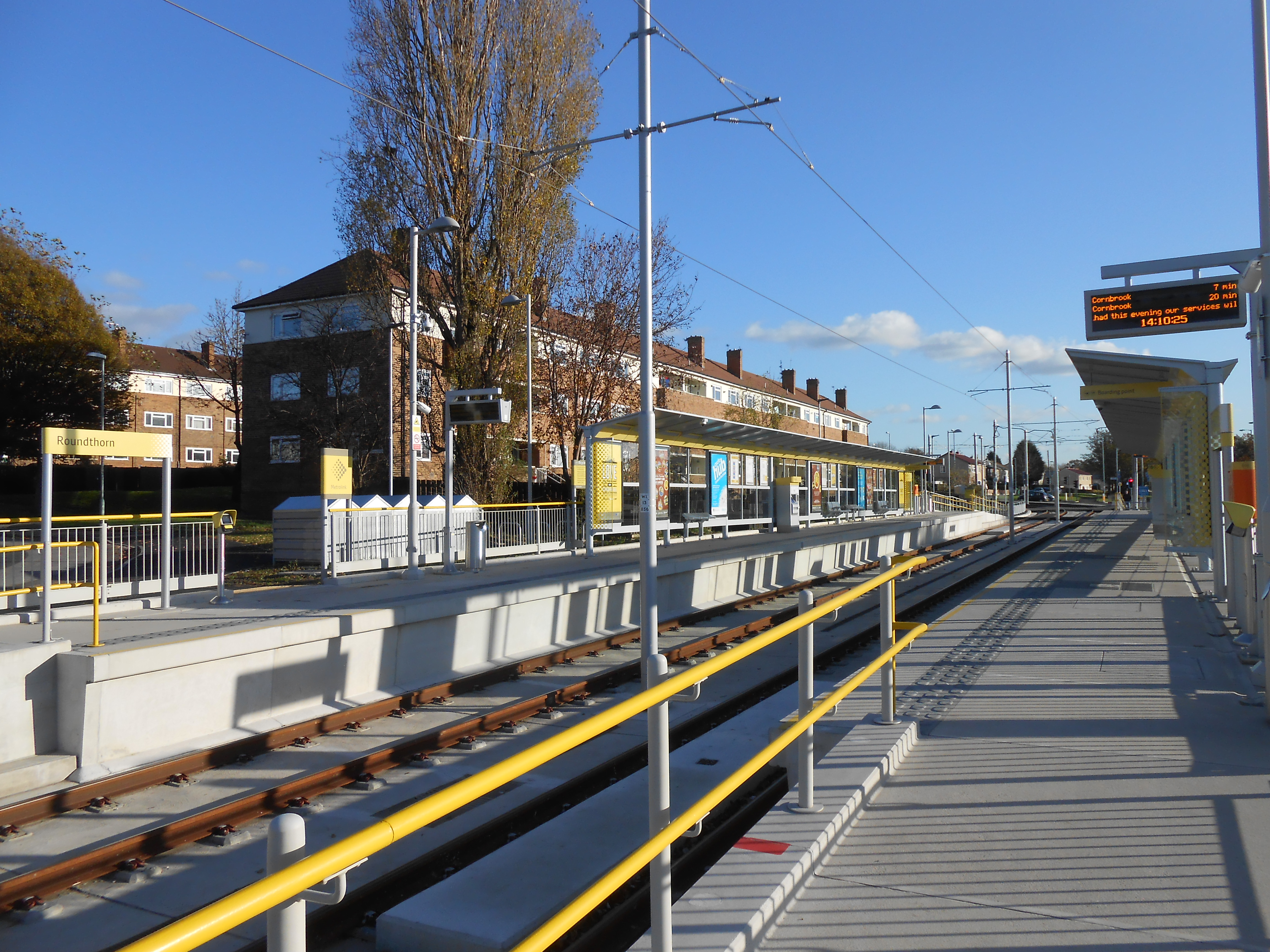

General information
- Location: Baguley, City of Manchester; England
- Coordinates: 53.39266°N 2.28918°W
- System: Metrolink station
- Line: Manchester Airport Line
- Platforms: 2

Other information
- Status: In operation
- Fare zone: 3/4

History
- Opened: 3 November 2014
Route map
Location

Roundthorn is a tram stop on the Manchester Metrolink network. It opened on 3 November 2014 on the Airport Line, between Southmoor Road and Roundthorn Road. The stop is next to the Roundthorn Industrial Estate and is the closest Metrolink stop to Wythenshawe Hospital.

== Services ==
Trams run every 12 minutes north to Victoria and south to Manchester Airport.

Preceding station	Manchester Metrolink	Following station
Martinscroft towards Manchester Airport	Manchester Airport–Victoria	Baguley towards Victoria

=== Ticket zones ===
Roundthorn stop is located in ticket zones 3 and 4.
