= Royton branch =

Former railway line in England

Coordinates: 53.5611°N 2.1102°W

The Royton Branch was a mile-long Lancashire & Yorkshire Railway built double track branch railway line in Greater Manchester, England, that ran from Royton Junction (renamed Royton in 1978) on the Oldham Loop Line to Royton.

== History ==
=== Opening ===
Royton Station opened on 21 March 1864 by the Lancashire & Yorkshire Railway to link the mill town of Royton to their rail network.

=== Ownership changes ===
Passing in 1923 to the London Midland & Scottish Railway it was considered for electrification in 1924 but those plans were shelved. In 1948 the line was nationalised becoming part of British Railways London Midland Region who ran the line until it fell foul of the Beeching cuts.

=== Closure ===
The line closed to freight on 2 November 1964, and passengers on 16 April 1966, officially closing on 18 April.

== Accidents ==
Although a short line, it was well-used but poorly maintained. This led to a number of accidents, the most serious being a collision on 31 October 1908 that killed a fireman, and on 8 February 1961 when a train derailed at Royton hitting local houses but causing only minor injuries.
