= Middleton railway station =

Middleton railway station may refer to:

- Middleton railway station, Greater Manchester
- Middleton Junction railway station, Greater Manchester
- Middleton railway station, South Australia
- Middleton North railway station, Northumberland, England
- Middleton railway station, New Zealand
- Middleton railway station (Derbyshire), Derbyshire, England

== See also ==
- Midleton railway station, County Cork, Ireland
- Middleton (disambiguation)
- Middleton Towers railway station, Norfolk
