= Oldham Central railway station =

Former railway station in England

Oldham Central

General information
- Location: Oldham; England
- Coordinates: 53.5379°N 2.1104°W
- Grid reference: SD928046
- Platforms: 2

Other information
- Status: Disused

History
- Original company: Lancashire and Yorkshire Railway
- Pre-grouping: Lancashire and Yorkshire Railway
- Post-grouping: London, Midland and Scottish Railway

Key dates
- 1 November 1847: First station opened
- 1 July 1861: Second station opened
- 18 April 1966: Closed
Location

Oldham Central railway station was opened on 1 November 1847 as part of the Lancashire and Yorkshire Railway's extension of its Oldham branch line. It was eventually one of six stations in the town of Oldham and was adjacent to Clegg Street railway station.

== Branch extension ==
The first railway to reach Oldham was the Oldham Branch Railway which opened in March 1842. This line was constructed by the Manchester and Leeds Railway (M&LR), it ran from Oldham junction (later known as Middleton, then Middleton Junction), on the M&LR main line from Manchester to Leeds, the branch terminated at Oldham Werneth.

It was soon decided that Oldham Werneth station was inconveniently located to the west of the Oldham town centre from which it was separated by higher ground.

On 8 July 1847 the Manchester and Leeds Railway had changed its name to the Lancashire and Yorkshire Railway (L&YR) and later that year, on 1 November, the L&YR extended the Oldham Branch Railway just over 1 mile (1.6 km) mile via two tunnels and a cutting to Oldham Mumps.

== Station ==
The extension had one intermediate station, Oldham Central, located on the Oldham town centre side immediately beyond the second tunnel.

Little is known about this station and it was probably of a temporary nature, Quick (2023) reports that it was not mentioned in all the usual timetables or diagrams, nor was it mentioned by name in newspapers, although the Manchester Courier reporting on the extension mentioned three stations, the former terminus Werneth, the new terminus Mumps and the Town Station that would be of a temporary character and would be improved later, situated at the bottom of Clegg Street.

The second station was built on the same site, on the Oldham side of the tunnels from Werneth, it opened on 1 July 1861.

In 1864 it was announced that Mr Walters was to be employed as the architect for new station at Central, the station was rebuilt during 1865 and 1866, the final cost of which was £7,587 (equivalent to £888,000 in 2023 (Note: UK Retail Price Index inflation figures are based on data from Clark, Gregory (2017), "The Annual RPI and Average Earnings for Britain, 1209 to Present (New Series)", MeasuringWorth)), the platforms were adjusted and offset to ensure that they did not encroach onto the lines through Clegg Street station that had opened in 1861.

The 'up' platform began shortly after the tunnel entrance and ended at the footbridge adjacent to the road-bridge carrying Clegg Street over the lines. (Note: Down trains usually headed away from the major conurbation, usually London, some railway companies ran 'up' to their headquarters location. In this case 'down' was away from Manchester, where the company was based.)

The booking office was at street level in a small square at the junction of Wellington Street and Clegg Street. The down platform was accessed by an inclined passage running alongside and behind the booking office, the up platform had similar access after crossing the lines via the footbridge adjacent to Clegg Street.

There were waiting rooms on both platforms. The platforms had ridge and furrow glazed canopies that originally extended the length of the buildings but were cut back by 1957.

Although Central was conveniently located close to the town centre it was selected for closure, shutting on 18 April 1966.

The name of the station survives in the Oldham Central tram stop, which opened on 27 January 2014 and is located on Union Street.

Preceding station	Historical railways	Following station
Oldham Werneth	Lancashire and Yorkshire Railway; Oldham Loop Line	Oldham Mumps

== Bibliography ==
- Hooper, John (1991). An Illustrated History of Oldham's Railways. Pinner, Middlesex: Irwell Press. ISBN 9781871608199. OCLC 650187960. Most of the pages in this publication have no page numbers
- Marshall, John (1969). The Lancashire & Yorkshire Railway. Vol. 1. Newton Abbot: David & Charles. ISBN 978-0-7153-4352-4.
- Marshall, John (1970). The Lancashire & Yorkshire Railway. Vol. 2. Newton Abbot: David & Charles. ISBN 978-0-7153-4906-9.
- Quick, Michael (2023) [2001]. Railway passenger stations in Great Britain: a chronology (PDF). version 5.05. Railway & Canal Historical Society.
- Simmons, Jack (1997). "'up' and 'down'". In Simmons, Jack; Biddle, Gordon (eds.). The Oxford Companion to British Railway History From 1603 to the 1990s (1st ed.). Oxford: Oxford University Press. p. 548. ISBN 0-19-211697-5.
- Wells, Jeffrey (2002). The Oldham Loop part one: Manchester Victoria to Shaw & Crompton via Hillinwood, Oldham and Royton Junction. Scenes from the Past. Vol. 42 (part one). Stockport: Foxline. ISBN 978-1-870119-68-9.
