= Oldham Loop Line =

Historic railway line in the UK

The Oldham Loop Line was a suburban-line in Greater Manchester, England, used by trains that ran from Manchester Victoria to Rochdale via Oldham Mumps. Services on the line at the time of its closure were operated by Northern Rail.

The line closed on 3 October 2009 for conversion during 2009–2012 to light rail use for Metrolink services; the route now carries trams and is known as the Oldham and Rochdale Line (ORL).

== Description ==
The Oldham Loop diverged from the Caldervale Line at Thorpes Bridge Junction in Newton Heath, Manchester and re-joined it at Rochdale East Junction. The line was 12 1/8 miles (19.5 km) long, and was double-track from Thorpes Bridge Junction to Shaw & Crompton, and single-line from Shaw & Crompton to Rochdale East Junction. There were two tunnels on the route between Oldham Werneth and Oldham Central railway stations. There were nine intermediate stations on the route. In the early 1970s the line from Shaw & Crompton to Rochdale was reduced to single track working. This was due to save money on maintenance when services were much reduced.

== History ==
The history of the Oldham Loop Line was intertwined with the early history of railways in the Manchester and Oldham area, and to some extent also with the geography of Oldham which meant that there was no direct Manchester to Oldham line until quite late in the 19th century.

The first railway line to be built in the area was the Manchester and Leeds Railway (M&LR) which opened on 4 July 1839 to Littleborough and throughout on 1 March 1841. Although this line ran close to Rochdale, it missed out Middleton and more importantly Oldham as well. A station was built at Mills Hill to provide a railhead for Middleton and Oldham. This was only intended as a short time measure given that Oldham was already a substantial manufacturing centre by this date. The first railway into Oldham was a branch from Middleton Junction to Oldham Werneth which opened on 31 March 1842. This line included the Werneth Incline which had a gradient of 1 in 27 and was one of the steepest lines in the country regularly used by passenger trains. The situation of the first station in Oldham on the outskirts of town was not entirely satisfactory, and in 1847 the Lancashire and Yorkshire Railway (L&YR), the successor to the M&LR, extended the line from Oldham Werneth to a new station at Oldham Mumps. There was also an intermediate station at Oldham Central. The line and the two new stations opened on 1 November 1847.

There was a further extension of the line from Oldham Mumps to Rochdale East Junction on 1 November 1863. This line included stations at Milnrow, New Hey and Shaw & Crompton. A branch off this line to Royton was opened on 21 March 1864, followed on 1 July 1864 by Royton Junction railway station.

The operational problems of the Werneth Incline had led to the consideration of a more direct route from Oldham Werneth to Manchester to bypass it as early as 1848, but it was not until August 1876 that construction of the line began. It took nearly four years to complete, opening on 17 May 1880 along with the stations at Hollinwood and Dean Lane. Failsworth station opened slightly later on 26 April 1881. With the construction of this section of line the whole route from Rochdale East Junction to Thorpes Bridge Junction, Newton Heath was complete and it became known as the Oldham Loop Line.

In the early-1920s the L&YR proposed to electrify the Oldham Loop Line using a unique 1,200 volt side-contact third rail system, following the successful electrification of the nearby Bury Line with this system. The scheme progressed to an advanced stage, however with the reorganisations of railway companies in the 1920s, the new management had no interest in pursuing the scheme and it was dropped.

== Closures ==
The Royton to Royton Junction line was listed for closure by the Beeching Axe of the 1960s. Royton closed to goods services on 2 November 1964 and passenger services on 18 April 1966. Although not mentioned by Beeching, a further closure in the 1960s was Oldham Central which also closed on 18 April 1966.

Royton Junction station, renamed as Royton, stayed open but by the 1980s a replacement for it was being considered. Derker opened on 30 August 1985. For a short period trains stopped at either Derker or Royton, but eventually Royton (formerly Royton Junction) railway station was closed on 8 May 1987. This was the last station closure before the whole of the Oldham Loop Line was closed for conversion to Metrolink.

== Passenger train services ==
The pattern of passenger services over the line was always that all trains from Manchester ran to Oldham Mumps, but fewer continued on to terminate in a bay platform at Rochdale. It was not usual for trains to terminate at Oldham Mumps and instead they ran on to Royton (until its closure in 1966), and subsequently to Shaw & Crompton. While the Middleton Junction to Oldham Werneth line was open there were a few services over that route to Oldham Mumps, Royton or Rochdale. By 1950 this had reduced to a handful of trains per day, and the services over the line reduced further until its closure in early 1963.

During the late 1960s and early 1970s only slightly fewer trains ran from Oldham Mumps to Rochdale, but in May 1972 the Secretary of State for Transport announced that this part of the Oldham Loop would be closed. The closure did not go ahead because what later became the Greater Manchester Passenger Transport Executive (GMPTE) agreed to fund the continuation of services. The involvement of the GMPTE also led to a more frequent pattern of trains serving the Oldham Mumps to Rochdale section.

From 2007 Network Rail made the annual leaf fall timetable permanent year round due to concerns over the condition of the track and performance. Trains were timetabled to connect with the Caldervale Line services to Leeds via Hebden Bridge and Bradford Interchange. All stations and all scheduled train services were operated by Northern Rail and its predecessors. During the week, trains ran every 15 minutes on the route, with express trains leaving Manchester at 00 and 30 minutes past the hour calling at Oldham Mumps, Shaw & Crompton and all stations to Rochdale, and stopping trains calling at all stations between Manchester and Shaw & Crompton, leaving at 15 and 45 minutes past the hour. This skip-stop service gave an effective half hourly service frequency to the stations on the line. During the evenings and on Sundays services were less frequent with an hourly service calling at all stations.

== Goods services ==
At the time of closure the line's sole regular goods service was to the waste management plant next to Dean Lane railway station at the southern end of the Oldham Loop. Usually only a single train a day used this facility. Its current operation is unaffected by the conversion to Metrolink.

== Rolling stock ==
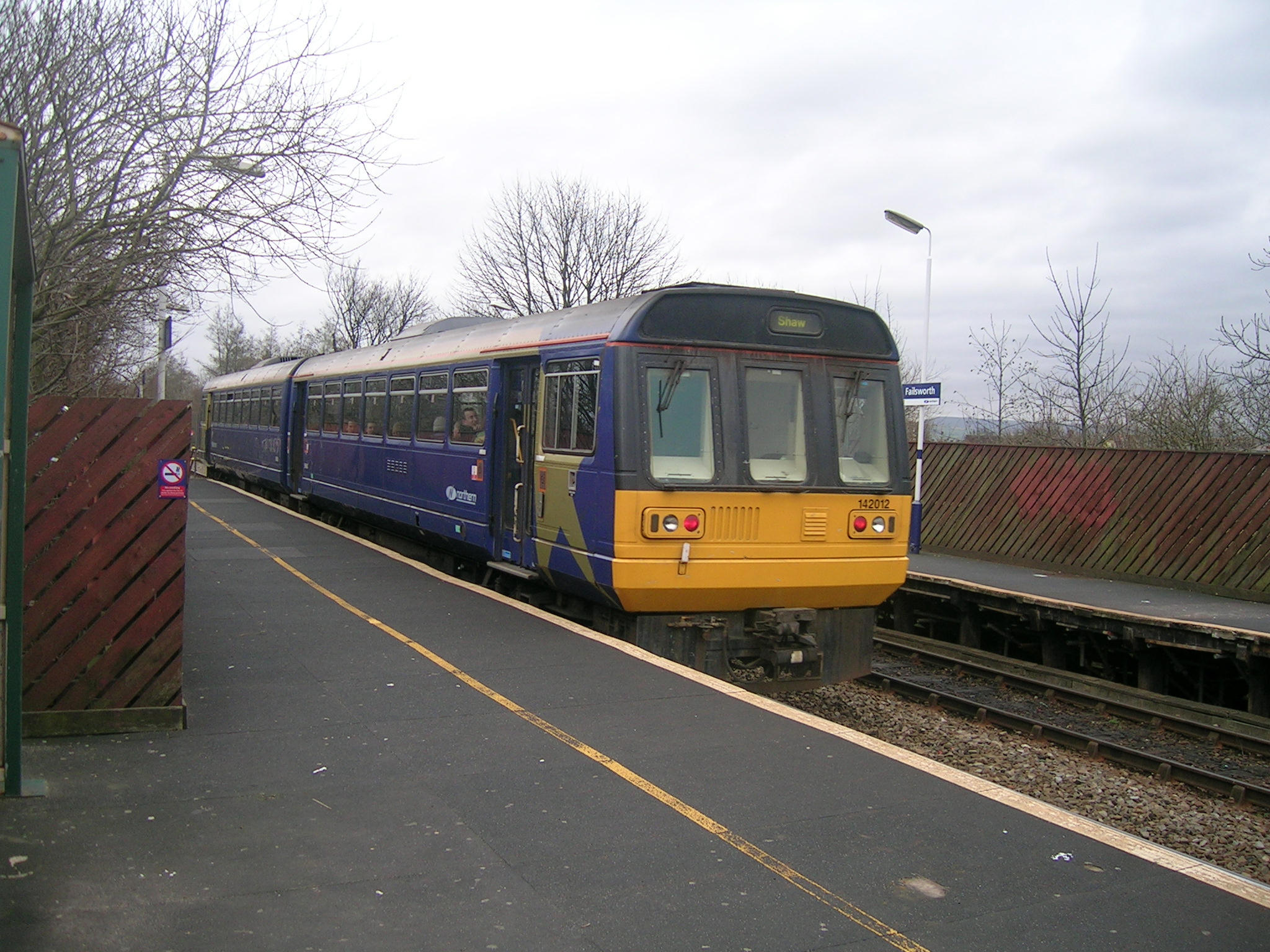
Northern Rail Class 142 at Failsworth station in 2008

In the period up to closure all passenger services were operated by diesel multiple units, as the line was not electrified. The most common types of unit were Class 142 and Class 150 with occasional Class 153 and Class 156.

== Last day events ==
Events held on 3 October 2009, the last day of operation, included the naming of Class 156 unit no 156 466 as Gracie Fields to commemorate the Oldham Loop Line's 146 years of history. A steam special hauled by locomotive 45231 was the last steam train over the line. It was followed later in the day by a heritage diesel railtour. The last train from Manchester Victoria to Rochdale departed at 23:25.

== Metrolink conversion ==
Manchester Metrolink Manchester to Rochdale line

The Oldham Loop was included in proposals in 1984 for conversion to light rail operation. The proposed Light Rapid Transit system was intended to run from Rochdale via Oldham through Manchester Victoria and across Manchester City Centre via on-street tram lines. The system eventually came into operation in 1992 as Manchester Metrolink. While the Oldham loop line was not included in the first phase of Metrolink, the line is now open, having been converted to Metrolink operation as part of its Phase 3 development.

Work started on the conversion in 2009, after heavy rail services ceased on 3 October 2009. Replacement bus services were planned to operate until the tram service commenced, but lack of patronage led to their withdrawal within months. Pending completion, former rail users had the choice between normal bus services, none of which ran along the complete length of the loop line, or driving to an alternative station. The latter occurred immediately after the Oldham Loop closure, leading to severe overcrowding on the Caldervale line In response TfGM stepped in to pay for the former loop line stock to be used to strengthen Manchester-Rochdale services.

GMPTE originally announced that Metrolink services would be introduced as follows

- Manchester to Central Park (Monsall) – spring 2011
- Manchester to Oldham Mumps – autumn 2011
- Manchester to Rochdale station – spring 2012

By summer 2011, the project was running several months behind schedule. The reasons include diversion of resources to other Metrolink extensions to Chorlton and Ashton (themselves badly behind schedule) and issues with the new signalling system proposed for systemwide use. Announced dates for Oldham loop openings were shown on Metrolink's own site as follows on 11 August 2011

- Manchester to Central Park – winter 2011
- Manchester to Oldham Mumps via former railway line – spring 2012
- Manchester to Rochdale station – summer 2012
- Oldham/ Rochdale street sections – 2014

Transport for Greater Manchester announced during the week commencing 4 June 2012 that the line as far as Oldham Mumps will open to passenger services as an extension of the Manchester Victoria to St Werburgh's Road service on Wednesday 13 June 2012.

Trams finally began running through to Shaw & Crompton on 16 December 2012 and through to Rochdale on 28 February 2013, almost a year later than originally planned. This section has two new stops (at Kingsway and Newbold) and has been re-doubled from Shaw to Rochdale, except for the flyover which takes it across the Calder Valley main line. Trams also began running through to East Didsbury in May 2013, with the commissioning of the South Manchester Line extension from St Werburgh's Road.

The local press have reported a series of complaints about the conversion project and, latterly, the delayed opening dates.

Phase 3B of the expansion project involved constructing a branch between Werneth and Oldham Mumps into Oldham town centre. This was fully operational in 2014. The line between the heavy-rail Oldham Mumps and Oldham Werneth stations has been lifted for re-use in other areas.

== Places served ==
The places served by the Oldham Loop Line in the period immediately before closure were as follows:

- Dean Lane: for Newton Heath
- Failsworth
- Hollinwood
- Oldham Werneth: for Werneth and Chadderton
- Oldham Mumps: for Oldham Town Centre
- Derker
- Shaw & Crompton
- Newhey
- Milnrow
