= Manchester Oldham Road railway station =

Former railway station in England

Manchester Oldham Road

General information
- Location: Manchester; England
- Coordinates: 53.487216°N 2.228851°W
- Grid reference: SJ847989

Other information
- Status: Disused

History
- Original company: Manchester and Leeds Railway
- Pre-grouping: Lancashire and Yorkshire Railway
- Post-grouping: London, Midland and Scottish Railway

Key dates
- 4 July 1839: Station opened
- 1 January 1844: Closed to passengers
- 7 October 1968: Closed to freight
Location

Manchester Oldham Road station opened in 1839 as the terminus station of the Manchester and Leeds Railway (M&LR) in Collyhurst, Manchester. When the M&LR opened Manchester Victoria in 1844 as its new Manchester passenger station Oldham Road was converted to a goods station which it remained until its closure in 1968.

== Opening ==
The station was formally opened on 3 July 1839 when two trains carrying the company directors and numerous guests departed for Littleborough where a cold collation was provided before the return to Manchester. The station opened to the public on 4 July 1839.

The station was located on the north side of Oldham Road between Lees Street on its western boundary and St George's Street to the east. (Note: Not to be confused with Lees Street in Openshaw – Lees Street in Collyhurst was subsequently demolished and incorporated into the station.) The station was set back from Oldham Road, with access to the station building via both sides of the Railway Tavern; access was also available from St George's Street.

In its early days, the station was known by several names, usually reflecting its geographical position, the M&LR opening notice called it St George's Street, Oldham Road as did Love (1839) in his description of the station and services and the local press in their article describing the opening of the railway. An early guide to the railway doesn't name the station but describes it as "situate at the East end of the town, in Lees Street, Oldham Road", Bradshaw's 1839 timetable merely says Manchester but does have a map showing the station set back from Oldham Road.

== Description ==
The line reached the station by a 730 yards (670 m) long, fifty-eight-arch brick viaduct, 30 feet above the surrounding streets.

The station was described by Wishaw in 1842.

The Manchester station and depôt are situate between Lees Street and St. George's Street. There are several lines of way at this station, which is entirely elevated on arches. The passenger-shed is covered with a wooden roof in two spans. The booking-office is on the ground-floor: and the passenger-platform is approached by a flight of forty-five steps, each of 7½ inches rise. The whole length of the station is 176 yards, and the width 80 yards.

The station was initially worked using a stationary winding engine at Miles Platting hauling trains out of the station and up the incline, trains worked into the station by gravity.

The arches underneath the viaduct and the station were used to store goods and merchandise which created difficulties in moving items between the levels, in 1841 a steam-powered wagon hoist capable of handling 1,000 long tons (1,000 t) daily was installed, two lifts were eventually installed and they were still in use long after the incline down into the lower yard was installed, finally being demolished in 1946–1947.

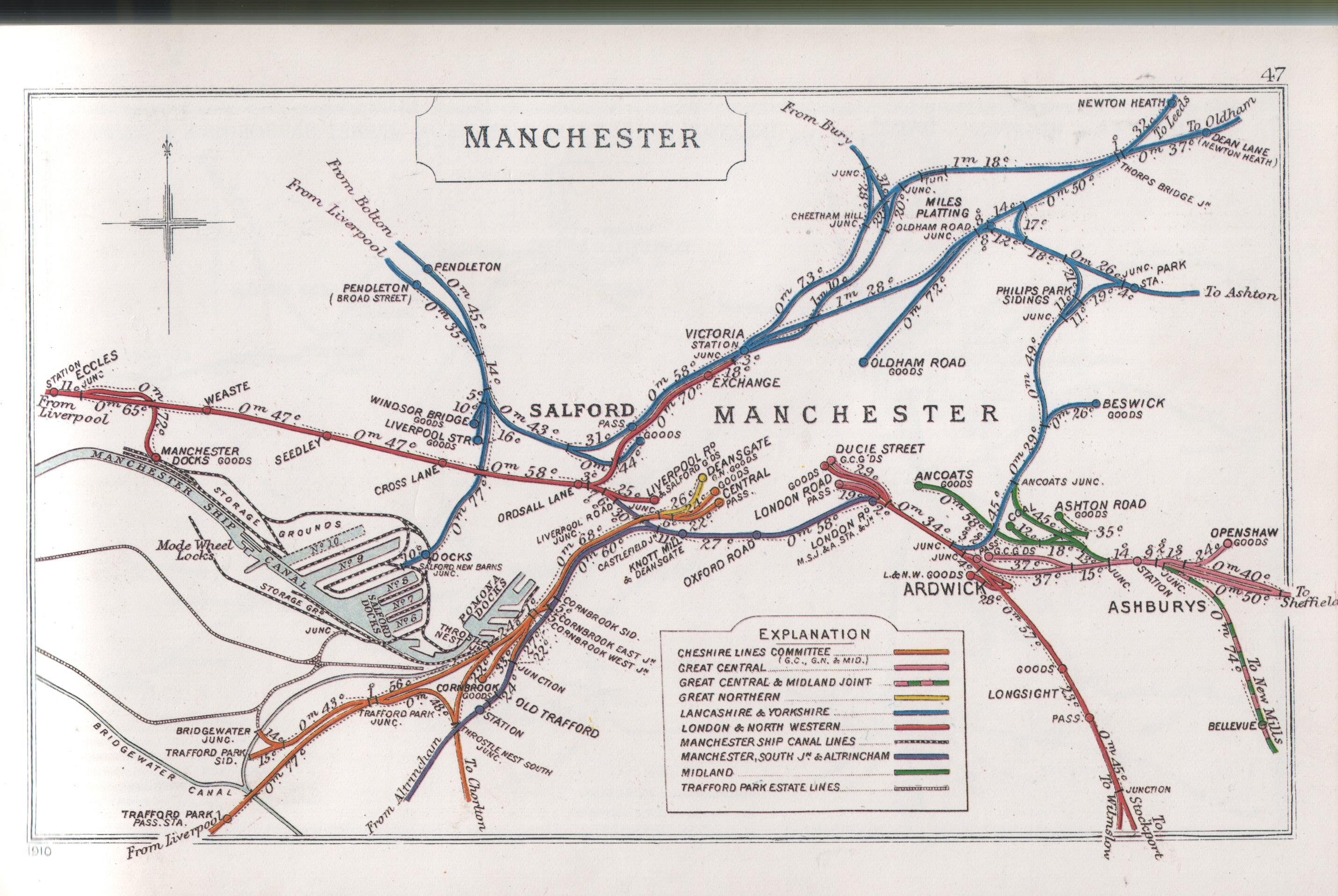
Railway Clearing House diagram of railways in central Manchester in 1910 showing the Lancashire & Yorkshire Railway line from Oldham Road Junction to Oldham Road goods depot.

== Passenger station 1839—1844 ==
Daily departures (except Sundays) to Littleborough on opening were at 0700, 0800, 1000, 1100, 1300, 1600, 1800 with a further departure to Rochdale at 1900. By October services had been refined to 0800, 0900, 1000, 1100, 1300, 1500, 1600, 1700, 1800 and 1900, with Sunday services at 0800, 0900, 1730 and 1900.

In 1839, both the M&LR and the Liverpool and Manchester Railway (LMR) realised that their respective stations were too far from the city centre and the gap between their stations was the only impediment to through travel between Liverpool and Hull. Despite the conflicting aspirations of the two companies, negotiations between the two resulted in agreement to build a new station, which became Manchester Victoria, at the central location of Hunt's Bank, with the M&LR being the principal owners and the LMR having limited rights of use. An Act of Parliament, receiving royal assent on 1 July 1839, enabling construction of this extension and the "enlargement of stations, yards, warehouses, and other Conveniences in the Town of Manchester".

== Goods station 1844—1877 ==
Once Manchester Victoria opened to M&LR passengers on 1 January 1844, Oldham Road station was converted to a goods station. (Note: In fact Oldham Road station's fate as a goods station was sealed before it opened, the Act for the extension into Manchester Victoria passing two days before the opening of the initial railway.) Goods trains operated along what was now a short 72 chains (1,400 m) branch line from Oldham Road Junction near Miles Platting. The business offices (including the Superintendent's office) of the railway remained at the station.

At least 8 acres (3.2 ha)s of land immediately to the North of the station was laid out as a goods yard accessed by multiple turntables.

A five-storey brick warehouse was built c. 1845 at right angles to the end of the original passenger station, the warehouse had two railway tracks, reached by turntables from the original tracks, servicing wooden platforms at the side. There were chutes and hoppers between the floors and hoists mounted in the roof.

In 1847 the Manchester & Leeds Railway amalgamated with several other railways to become the Lancashire & Yorkshire Railway (L&YR).

== Goods station 1877—1916 ==
The amount of goods traffic, especially fruit and vegetables, into Oldham Road continued to expand. The use of hoists to transfer wagons between the levels of the goods yard eventually began to limit the amount of traffic which could be handled. It took three and a half minutes to effect an exchange of wagons, one up, the other down. The station needed some sort of direct rail access into the goods yard in order to expand and in 1871 obtained an Act to allow it to acquire and remove St George's church and cemetery which stood in the way of the only possible route for an incline down into yard. The Act stipulated that the church had to be replaced before the old church could be demolished, the company completed building a new church on Oldham Road in 1874 and a new Act was obtained in 1874 to authorise the 10.53 chains (212 m) 1 in 27 incline which came into use c. 1877.

In 1874 the L&YR ceased to use the station for mineral traffic with the exception that coal was still delivered to Manchester Corporation Rochdale Road Gas Works via a siding that ran through the goods yard.

A large goods warehouse was constructed in 1880—1881 and by 1893 two smaller warehouses had been built. By 1886 the wholesale potato market was established adjacent to the goods station, between the original station building and Oldham Road, it was rail served with multiple tracks.

In 1889 an Act was obtained to widen the double-track viaduct leading into Oldham Road station, a contract was let in December 1890, the opening date of the widened viaduct is not known but it was open in 1916 when the reconstructed goods yard opened.

== Goods station 1916—1968 ==
The goods depot was completely rebuilt and enlarged between 1913 and 1916, the remodelling provided space for an additional 250 wagons. A large area of workers' houses to the west of the station were demolished with a widened Thompson Street becoming the new western boundary, the displaced people being rehoused by the company. The demolitions provided an extension of approximately 282 yards (258 m) long with an average of 88 yards (80 m) wide.

A new three-storied office building was constructed with its frontage on Oldham Road in 1913–1914. Access to the site was from both Oldham Road and Rochdale Road, two principal roads out of Manchester to the North. A shipping and delivery shed with a new fruit shed was built, the former fruit warehouses being demolished and the earlier warehouse converted into a storage shed.

A complete revision of the track layout was undertaken, with a "distributing line" being laid through the site enabling 74 of the 93 turntables to be replaced with points and crossings, the remaining turntables were replaced with larger ones to accommodate increased wagon sizes. The distributor line started from the bottom of the incline running underneath the south-west end of the original station, along the gap between the original running lines and the potato market, to loop back under the viaduct to the base of the incline.

The goods yard was at this time equipped with three gantry cranes:

- an electrically operated crane of 5 long tons (5.1 t) capacity able to access both the higher and lower tracks,
- a 10 long tons (10 t) capacity crane just outside the new shipping and delivery shed, and
- a "Goliath" travelling crane of 20 long tons (20 t) capacity running parallel with the high-level viaduct.

The new fruit shed was constructed to the north of the new shipping and delivery shed against the Rochdale Road boundary. The whole site now occupying 23.25 acres (9.41 ha) within which there were 9 acres (3.6 ha) of buildings and 8.25 miles (13.28 km) of track.

There were by now two potato sheds, one each side of the remaining stub of St George's Street. The westerly yard, known as top potato yard was roofed during the refurbishment, the yard could accommodate 110 wagons under the 6,212 square yards (5,194 m^{2}) roof. The lower potato yard, better described as the Wholesale Potato Market was operated by the railway under an agreement with Manchester Corporation, had been roofed earlier. The two yards handled approximately 50,000 long tons (51,000 t) of potatoes each year.

In its final form the goods station had a number of 'sheds', which were called the Fruit Shed, Provision Shed, Delivery Shed, Fish Shed, Cloth Shed, Grain Shed, Potato Shed and the Shipping Shed, indicating the diversity of traffic handled there. British Railways London Midland Region continued to handle sundries traffic at Oldham Road for some years after the nationalisation of 1948.

The goods station and yard closed to traffic on 7 October 1968. The original M&LR buildings and the early warehouse were demolished in 1968.

== Current status ==
The area is very different from what it once was. The station and line no longer exist, although part of the viaduct which led to it is still visible from the railway line from Victoria to Miles Platting and from the eastern end of New Allen Street. Most of the old station and sidings have since been replaced by Manchester Central Community Fire Station, a large Royal Mail sorting depot and a Chinese supermarket.

== Bibliography ==
- Ashmore, Owen (1969). The industrial archaeology of Lancashire. David & Charles. ISBN 978-0-7153-4339-5. OCLC 1151446544.
- Axon, William Edward Armytage (1886). The annals of Manchester a chronological record from the earliest times to the end of 1885. J. Heywood, Deansgate and Ridgefield. OCLC 1039511691.
- Bradshaw, George (25 October 1839). Bradshaw's Railway Time Tables and assistant to railway Travelling with illustrative maps & plans. London: Shepherd and Sutton, and Wyld.
- Clinker, C.R. (October 1978). Clinker's Register of Closed Passenger Stations and Goods Depots in England, Scotland and Wales 1830–1977. Bristol: Avon-Anglia Publications & Services. ISBN 0-905466-19-5. OCLC 5726624.
- Dawson, Anthony (2017). The early railways of Manchester. ISBN 978-1-4456-6518-4. OCLC 1023171845.
- Ferneyhough, Frank (1980). Liverpool & Manchester Railway. Book Club Associates.
- Grant, Donald J. (2017). Directory of the Railway Companies of Great Britain (1st ed.). Kibworth Beauchamp, Leicestershire: Troubador Publishing Ltd. ISBN 978-1-78803-768-6.
- Hall, Stanley (1995). Rail Centres: Manchester. Ian Allan Ltd. ISBN 0-7110-2356-5.
- Lake, Chas S (January 1920). "A Modern Railway Goods Station in Manchester. Oldham Road, Lancashire & Yorkshire Railway". Railway Magazine. No. 271. pp. 8–18.
- Love, Benjamin (1839). Manchester as it is. Love and Barton.
- "The Manchester and Leeds Railway". The Law Times. Oxford University: Office of The Law times: 304. 1844.
- Marshall, John (1969). The Lancashire & Yorkshire Railway. Vol. 1. Newton Abbot: David & Charles. ISBN 978-0-7153-4352-4.
- Marshall, John (1970). The Lancashire & Yorkshire Railway. Vol. 2. Newton Abbot: David & Charles. ISBN 978-0-7153-4906-9.
- Maw, William H; Raworth, B Alfred, eds. (23 February 1917). "Oldham Road Goods Station, Manchester: Lancashire and Yorkshire Railway". Engineering. 103 (2669): 169–170 & Plate XIV.
- Normington, Thomas (1898). "A Companion to the Manchester & Leeds Railway (1841)". The Lancashire and Yorkshire Railway: Being a Full Account of the Rise and Progress of this Railway, Together with Numerous Interesting Reminiscences and Incidents on the Line. John Heywood.
- Parkinson-Bailey, John (2000). Manchester: An Architectural History. Manchester University Press. ISBN 0-7190-5606-3.
- Quick, Michael (2022) [2001]. Railway passenger stations in Great Britain: a chronology (PDF). version 5.04. Railway & Canal Historical Society. Archived from the original (PDF) on 25 November 2022.
- Whishaw, Francis (1842) [1840]. The Railways of Great Britain and Ireland practically described and illustrated (2nd ed.). London: John Weale (1840 publisher - Simpkin, Marshall & Co.). OCLC 36383414.

Preceding station	Disused railways	Following station
Terminus	M&LR	Middleton Junction
