= Oldham Branch Railway =

Coordinates: 53.54199°N 2.15599°W

The Oldham Branch Railway was an early railway of the Manchester and Leeds Railway Company connecting Oldham to Manchester.

The Manchester and Leeds Railway (M&LR) opened its Middleton Junction and Oldham Branch on 31 March 1842 from its mainline, the Manchester to Littleborough railway line (which had opened on 4 July 1839), at Middleton Junction (originally named Oldham Junction) to Oldham Werneth. This was the first railway to reach Oldham, albeit up a severe incline to Werneth on the west side of the town.

The branch had two stations, the junction at Middleton Junction and the terminus at Oldham.

Connecting the two stations the branch was 2 miles (3.2 km) long, most of which was the 1 mile 1,383 yards (2.874 km) Werneth Incline, one of the steepest passenger lines in Britain with a 1 in 27 gradient for about one mile (1.6 km).

The earliest trains to use this line required cable assistance to get to the top of the incline. The method of working was devised by Captain Laws, the company General Manager; it used a balancing load of mineral wagons and a brake van on a reserved track, with a cable passing round a large drum at the head of the incline. Traffic proceeding up the incline would be attached to the rope and drawn up under control by its own locomotive using the descending load to reduce the effort required. The next descending train would be used to draw the balancing load back up the incline. There were sufficient descending trains, both regular service trains and coal trains from Stockfield Colliery to ensure the service ran without much interruption. This arrangement continued until some time between 1851 and 1856, after which ordinary locomotive working was used.

The branch carried heavy traffic in its first few years, an average of 750,000 passengers per year, and plans were quickly made for the branch to be extended through the higher ground into Oldham town centre and beyond.

A 1 mile (1.6 km) extension was built by the construction of two tunnels with a cutting between them to the only intermediate station at Oldham Central located just beyond the second tunnel and then to Oldham Mumps. The line and stations opened on 1 November 1847.

On 12 August 1914 a goods and coal depot was opened at Chadderton. This was at the end of the 1,097 yards (1,003 m) long Chadderton Branch off the Middleton Junction and Oldham Branch approximately 400 yards (370 m) from Middleton Junction.

The line from Chadderton Junction to Oldham was closed to regular passengers in 1958 although some diverted services used it in 1960 and completely on 7 January 1963.

Middleton Junction closed to passengers on 3 January 1966.

The Chadderton goods and coal depot remained open and in use until 1988 (the track was eventually lifted in September 1991).

== Bibliography ==
- Brown, Joe (2021). Liverpool & Manchester Railway Atlas. Manchester: Crécy Publishing. ISBN 9780860936879. OCLC 1112373294.
- Holt, Geoffrey O.; Biddle, Gordon (1986). The North West. A Regional history of the railways of Great Britain. Vol. 10 (2nd ed.). David St. John Thomas. ISBN 978-0-946537-34-1. OCLC 643506870.
- Laws, John Milligan (1851). "Description of the mode of working an incline of 1 in 27½, on the Oldham Branch of the Lancashire and Yorkshire Railway". Minutes of the Proceedings of the Institution of Civil Engineers. 10 (1851): 246–248. doi:10.1680/imotp.1851.24092.
- Marshall, John (1969). The Lancashire & Yorkshire Railway. Vol. 1. Newton Abbot: David & Charles. ISBN 978-0-7153-4352-4.
- Marshall, John (1970). The Lancashire & Yorkshire Railway. Vol. 2. Newton Abbot: David & Charles. ISBN 978-0-7153-4906-9.
- Marshall, John (1981). Forgotten Railways:North-West England. David & Charles. ISBN 0-7153-8003-6.
- Quick, Michael (2022) [2001]. Railway passenger stations in Great Britain: a chronology (PDF). version 5.04. Railway & Canal Historical Society. Archived from the original (PDF) on 25 November 2022.
