= Royton railway station =

Former railway station in England

Royton

General information
- Location: Royton, Oldham; England
- Coordinates: 53.56495°N 2.11924°W
- Grid reference: SD921076

Other information
- Status: Disused

History
- Original company: Lancashire and Yorkshire Railway
- Pre-grouping: Lancashire and Yorkshire Railway
- Post-grouping: London, Midland and Scottish Railway

Key dates
- 21 March 1864: Opened
- 1916: Closed
- 1919: Reopened
- 18 April 1966: Closed
Location

Royton railway station served the town of Royton, England. It opened on 21 March 1864, and was at the end of a short branch line from Royton Junction railway station on the Oldham Loop Line. Royton closed to goods services on 2 November 1964, and to passenger services on 16 April 1966.

== Accidents ==
Two serious accidents occurred at Royton station.

The first was on 31 October 1908. A goods train from Aintree ran out of control on the gradient between Royton Junction and Royton station. It crashed into an empty train at Royton. The fireman of the goods train was killed, and the driver severely injured.

The second was at around 6:12 am on 8 February 1961 when the driver of a diesel multiple-unit passenger train lost control on the gradient down to Royton station. The train was being run empty, although there was one railway employee on board as a passenger. Neither the passenger nor the train guard was injured. The driver of the train was slightly injured when he leapt from the cab of the train just before it collided with the buffer stop at Royton. The train came to rest 30 yards beyond the buffer stop, crossing High Barn Street and crashing into some houses. Three houses were slightly damaged, and two severely damaged. No fatal or severe injuries occurred in the latter two, for one of them was a lock-up shop, and in the other the occupants were upstairs at the time. However, five people from the damaged houses were taken to hospital suffering from shock and bruises, and in one case also a fractured clavicle. All were eventually discharged.

Preceding station	Disused railways	Following station
Royton Junction; Line open, station closed	Lancashire and Yorkshire Railway; Royton branch	Terminus
