= Oldham Mumps railway station =

Former railway station in Greater Manchester, England

Oldham Mumps
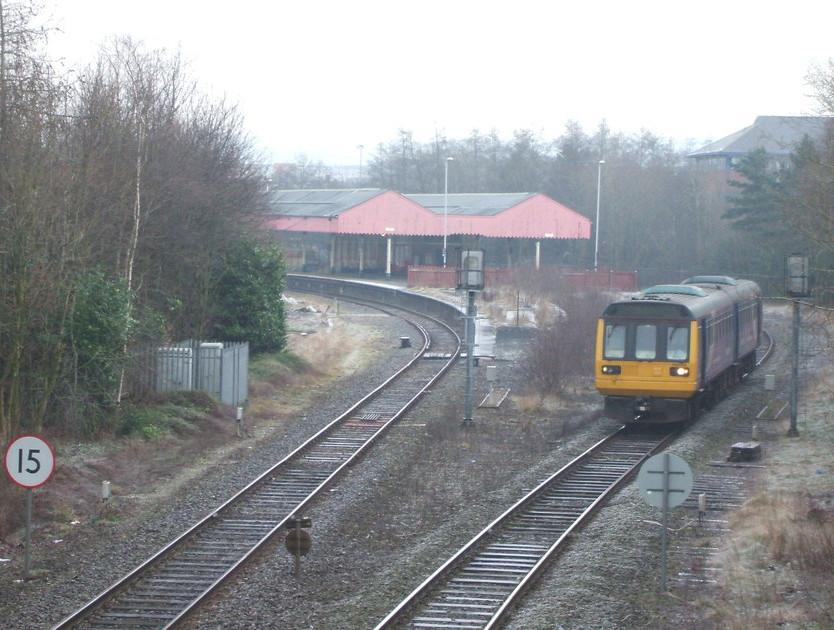
- The station in its last year of operation (2009)

General information
- Location: Oldham, Metropolitan Borough of Oldham, England
- Coordinates: 53.541°N 2.1022°W
- Platforms: 2

Other information
- Station code: OLM

Key dates
- 1 November 1847: Opened
- 3 October 2009: Closed
Location

Oldham Mumps was a railway station, which served the town of Oldham, Greater Manchester, England between 1847 and 2009. It was a stop on the Oldham Loop Line, 7 1/2 miles (12.1 km) north-east of Manchester Victoria. At the time of closure, it was operated and managed by Northern Rail.

The station, and the Oldham Loop Line were closed in October 2009 for conversion into a Manchester Metrolink tram line, renamed as the Oldham and Rochdale Line (ORL) and the station was demolished in 2010. Between 2012 and 2014, a temporary tram stop operated on the site of the station, until this was replaced by a permanent stop a short distance away. The name of the station survives in the present Oldham Mumps tram stop, which is located a short distance north of the former railway station, on the realigned track of the Oldham town centre tram line.

== History ==
=== Railway station (1847–2009) ===
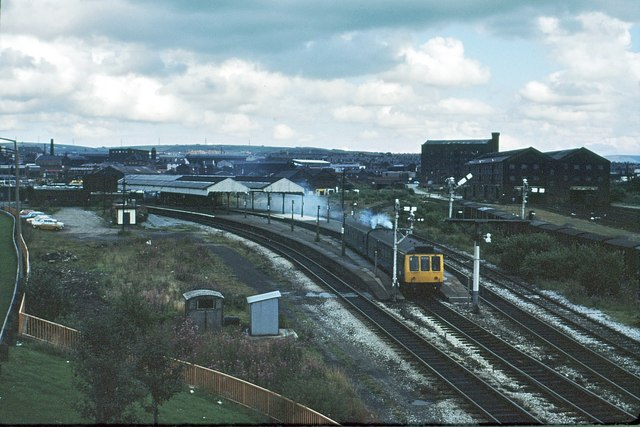
The station in 1978

The first railway to reach Oldham was a branch line which opened in March 1842, constructed by the Manchester and Leeds Railway (M&LR). This line commenced at Middleton Junction from the Manchester to Leeds line which had opened the previous year, to Oldham Werneth. Werneth station was located inconveniently, at the edge of the town centre, so the line was extended by one mile to Oldham Mumps in 1847. By this time, the Manchester and Leeds Railway had become part of the Lancashire and Yorkshire Railway (LYR).

Oldham Mumps station was opened on 1 November 1847; the name of the station is taken from its situation within the Mumps area of Oldham, which itself probably derived from the archaic word "mumper", slang for a beggar.

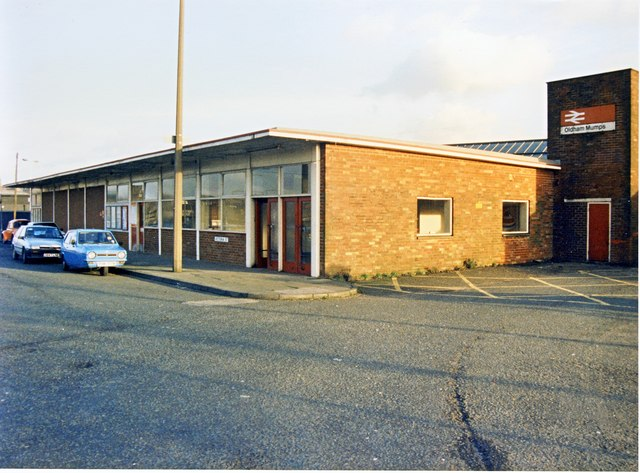
The station entrance in 1989

In August 1863, a 6-mile (9.7 km) extension was opened to Rochdale, also connecting to the Manchester-Leeds line, effectively creating a loop between Middleton to Rochdale.

The line between Middleton and Oldham was steeply inclined and therefore difficult to work; until 1854, the line had been cable-worked. The LYR obtained the Lancashire and Yorkshire Railway (New Works and Additional Powers) Act 1873 (36 & 37 Vict. c. clxxix) to build a more direct and less steep line between Oldham and Manchester, running via Failsworth; it would join the Manchester-Leeds line at Thorpes Bridge Junction. This line was opened in May 1880, therefore completing what became known as the Oldham Loop Line. The original line from Middleton to Oldham was closed in 1964.

In 1957, the main station building was rebuilt by British Railways. This building was demolished in the 1990s and the station facilities were concentrated on the main island platform, which was reached by an underpass. The station was reached across the dual-carriageway Oldham by-pass, a difficult walk from the town centre.

Preceding station	Historical railways	Following station
Oldham Central	London Midland Region of British Railways; Oldham Loop Line	Derker
Oldham Clegg Street	Lancashire & Yorkshire Railway	Terminus

=== Closure ===
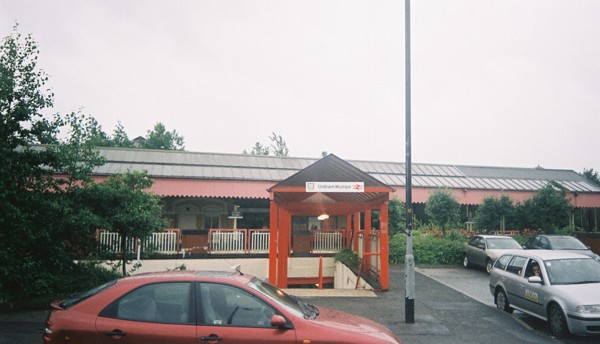
The station entrance in 2007

The station was closed due to the conversion of the line to Manchester Metrolink on 3 October 2009; by May 2010, it had been demolished. The station canopy was purchased by the East Lancashire Railway, after a successful public fundraising campaign. The canopy was restored and installed at Bury Bolton Street.

=== Temporary tram stop (2012–14) ===
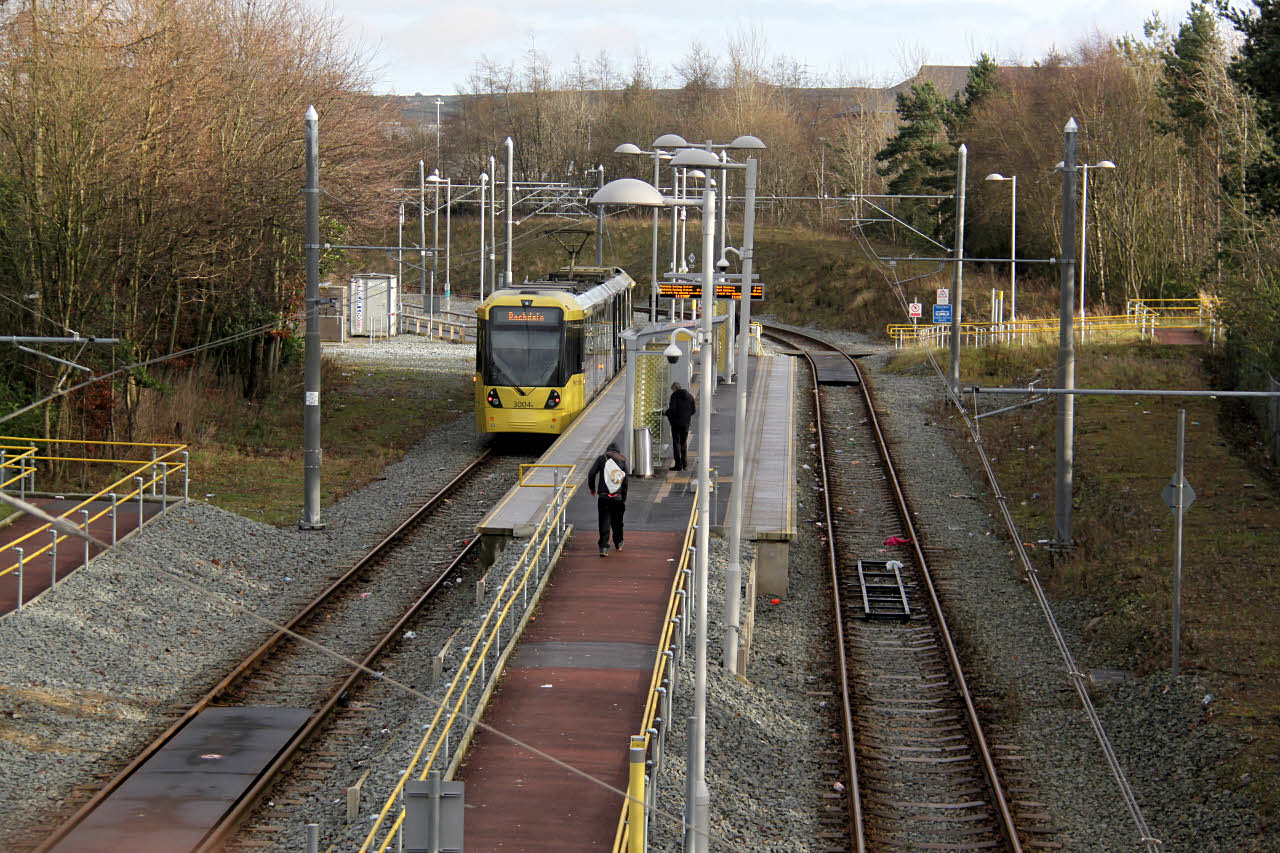
The temporary tram stop

In June 2010, Greater Manchester Passenger Transport Executive announced that it would submit a planning application for a temporary Metrolink terminus at Oldham Mumps, as part of the conversion of the former Oldham loop. It was to be sited close to the site of the former station. Services to the temporary terminus commenced on 13 June 2012.

The temporary tram stop was reached by crossing Oldham Way or by the free Metroshuttle service, which linked the station with the town centre and bus station.

The temporary tram stop was used as an interim measure, while the new street running tram line through Oldham town centre was built, and was closed on 18 January 2014. Its closure allowed for a 1 1/2-mile (2.4 km) stretch of track which had run through the station to be permanently abandoned.

=== Permanent tram stop ===
The permanent tram stop opened on 27 January 2014, along with the Oldham town centre tram line, on the site of the former B&Q store; there is also a bus interchange.

== The site today ==
In 2014, Oldham Council unveiled plans to redevelop the former station site and abandoned line, with a new retail and housing development called Prince's Gate.
