= Normanton railway station =

Railway station in West Yorkshire, England

Normanton
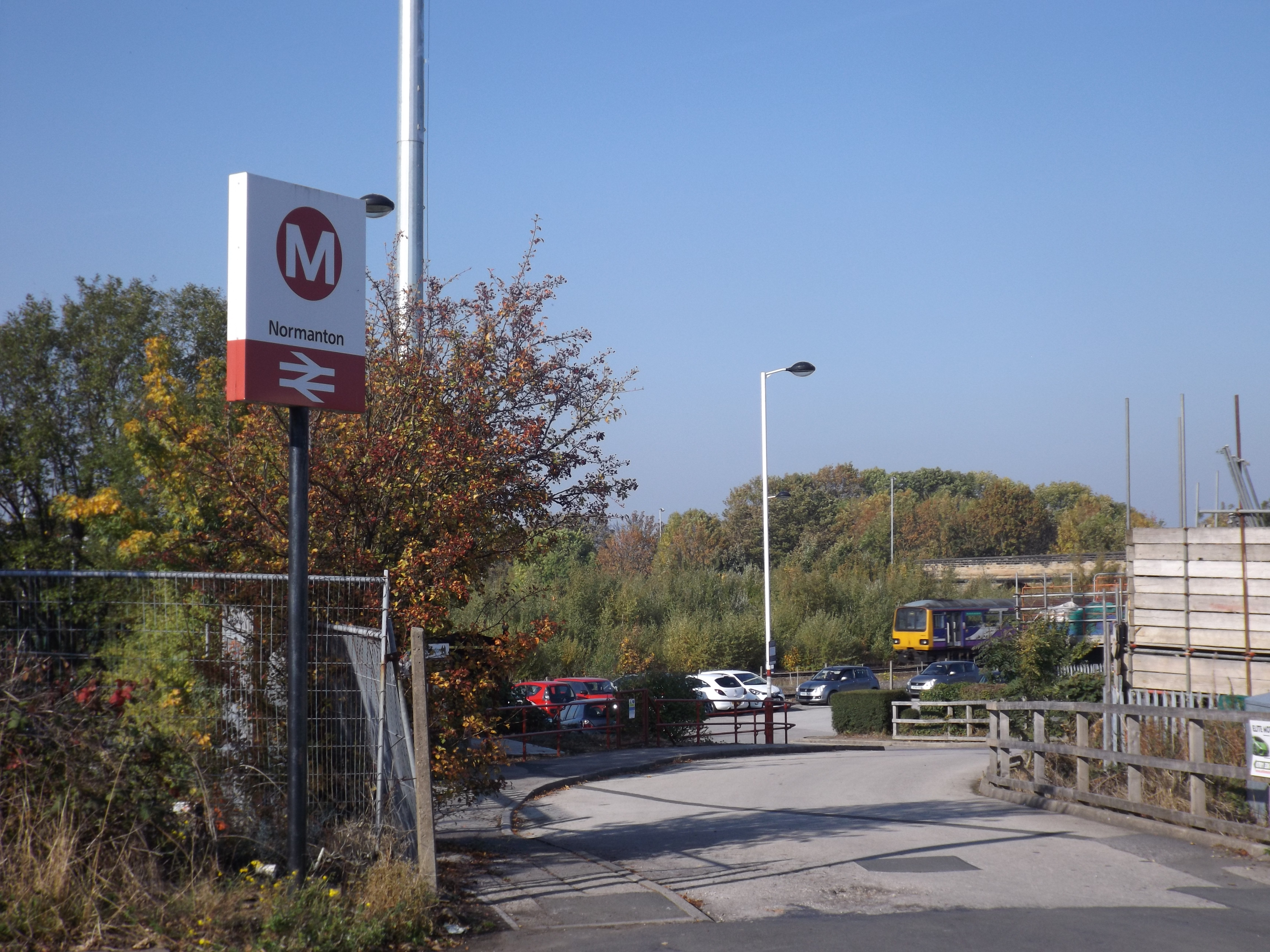
- The station approach with a British Rail Class 142 Pacer in the distance

General information
- Location: Normanton, City of Wakefield; England
- Coordinates: 53.700490°N 1.423520°W
- Grid reference: SE381228
- Manager: Northern
- Transit authority: West Yorkshire Metro
- Platforms: 2

Other information
- Station code: NOR
- Fare zone: 3
- Classification: DfT category F1

History
- Original company: North Midland Railway
- Pre-grouping: Midland Railway
- Post-grouping: London, Midland and Scottish Railway

Key dates
- 30 June 1840: Station opened

Passengers
- 2020/21: ▼51,594
- 2021/22: ▲0.145 million
- 2022/23: ▲0.172 million
- 2023/24: ▲0.179 million
- 2024/25: ▲0.202 million
Location
Notes
- Passenger statistics from the Office of Rail and Road

Normanton railway station serves the town of Normanton in West Yorkshire, England. It lies 11 miles (18 km) south-east of Leeds railway station on the Hallam Line, which is operated by Northern.

== History ==
The original station was opened by the North Midland Railway (NMR) on 30 June 1840 (this was one day before nearby Castleford Railway Station which opened on 1 July 1840) on their main line towards Leeds, creating an interchange station between the North Midland Railway (NMR), the York and North Midland Railway (Y&NMR) and the Manchester and Leeds Railway (M&LR) – establishing a three company junction.

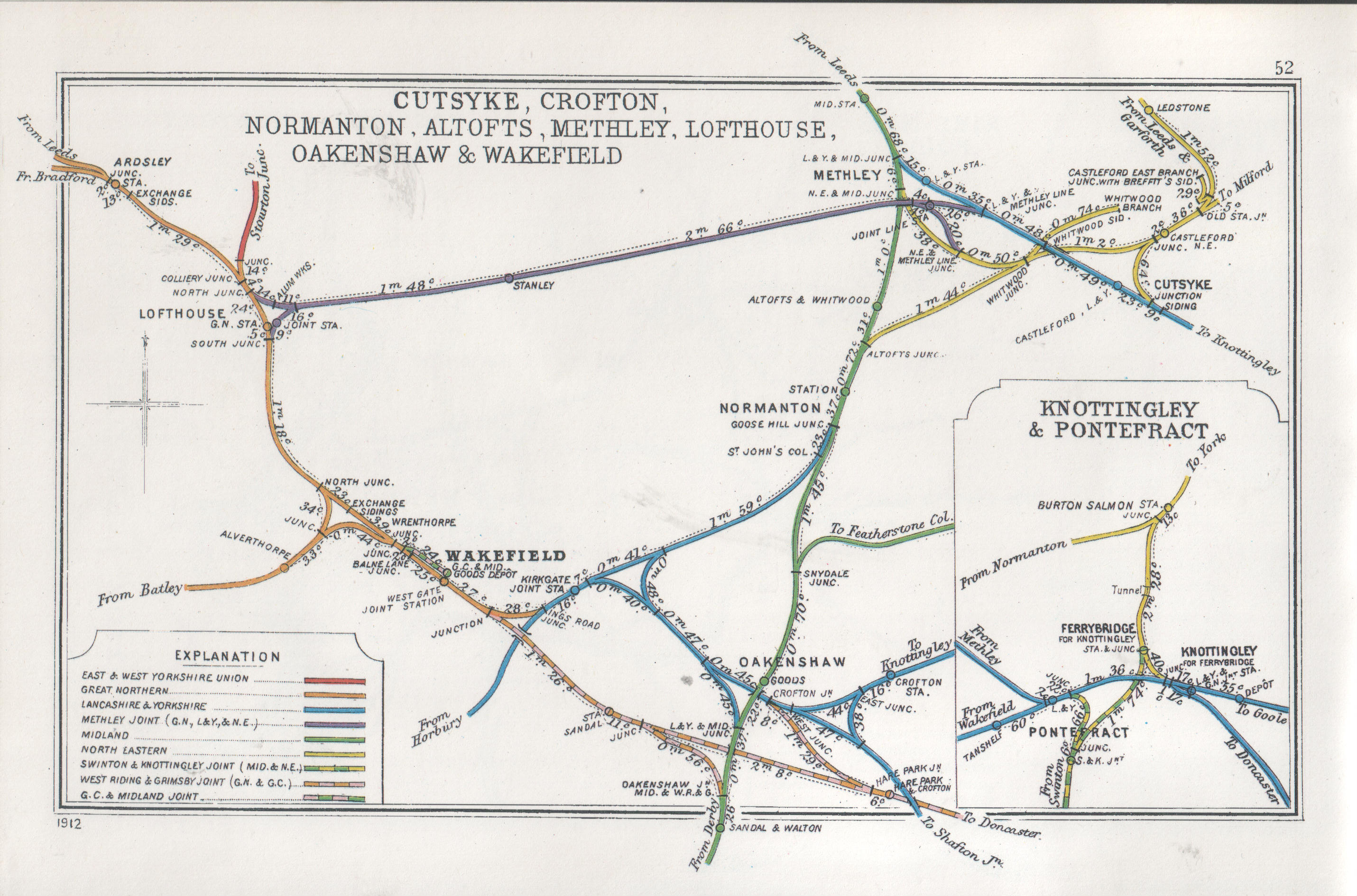
A 1912 Railway Clearing House Junction Diagram showing railways in the vicinity of Normanton

It became the focus of several railway lines in the mid-19th century. Construction began in 1837 under the supervision of George Stephenson for the North Midland. This was soon followed by an addition from the York and Midland Railway and then by the Manchester and Leeds line which all joined at Normanton thereby giving the town access to much of the country. The NMR, already open between Derby and Rotherham (Masborough), was opened between Rotherham and Leeds (Hunslet Lane) on 1 July 1840, as was the Y&NMR between Normanton (on the NMR) and Burton Salmon (the line between Burton Salmon and York already being open). The M&LR route between Normanton and Hebden Bridge followed, opening on 5 October 1840, and on 1 March 1841, the final section of the M&LR route to Manchester was opened. The Leeds and Manchester lines crossed a 51 miles (82 km) stretch across the Pennines and at the time boasted the world's longest railway station platform at Normanton – a quarter of a mile (400m) long.

In Victorian times Normanton station was one of the most important stations in northern England and can boast that Queen Victoria stopped over in The Station Hotel. The town also served as an important part of the transport infrastructure for national and local industries including coal and bricks, although most of this was lost during the 1950s and 1960s with the last remaining operational brickworks eventually closing in the mid-nineties. There were three brickworks in town and were all built within the small area known as Newland, taking advantage of the abundance of clay from the area. A fourth works was founded in the 1890s by a man named Thomas Kirk from Nottingham who had heard rumours that Normanton was rapidly turning into an important junction on the railways. Both Kirk and his sons used their life savings and formed the Normanton Brick Company at nearby Altofts which is still in operation today.

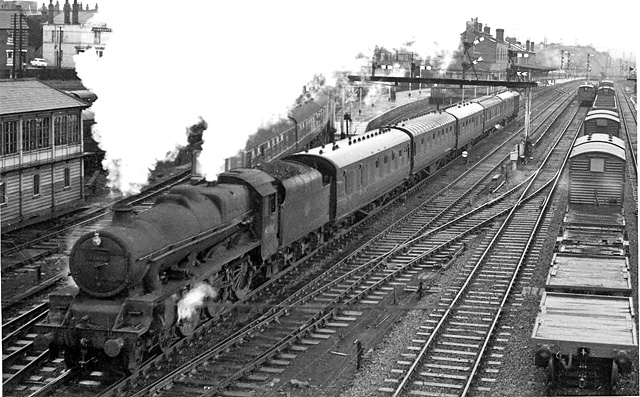
'Jubilee' Class 4-6-0 'Leander' at Normanton in 1961

The station lost many of its services in the aftermath of the Beeching Report, with both express and local trains on the NMR main line ceasing to call in 1968 and trains to York ending in 1970, leaving only Hallam Line trains to serve the station. The NMR was closed completely in 1988 south of the former Goose Hill Junction (where it diverged from the M&L line to Wakefield) although part of the route further south remains open to serve a glassworks at Monk Bretton, near Barnsley. This has led to much of the railway infrastructure here becoming redundant and being removed - the main buildings have been demolished, the sidings and goods lines lifted, the bay platforms filled in and the main island shortened considerably. The old Station Hotel still stands, but it has been converted into residential apartments.

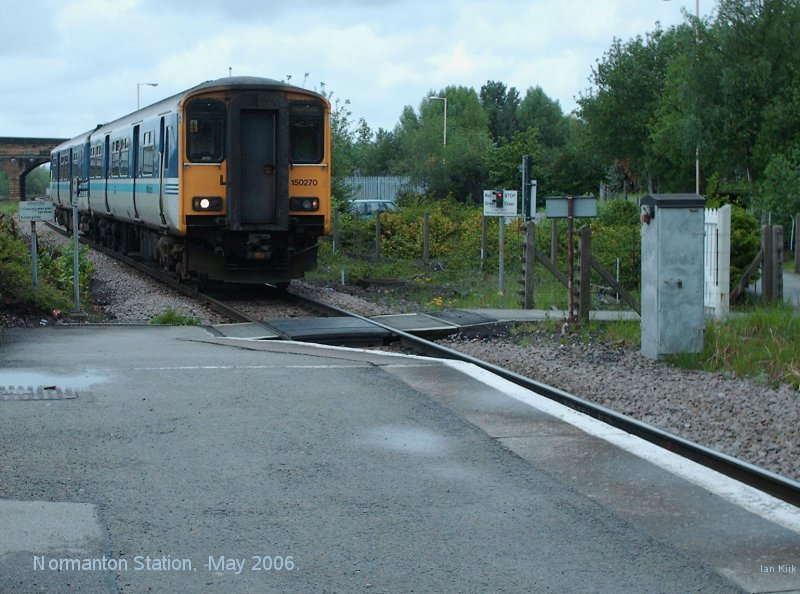
Former pedestrian crossing at the end of platform 2. Now replaced by a footbridge.

== Facilities ==
The station is unstaffed, but each platform has a self-service ticket machine is provided (located near the footbridge for Platform 1 and in the shelter on Platform 2) to allow passengers to purchase tickets before boarding or collect pre-paid tickets. There are two waiting shelters, along with digital display screens, timetable posters and an automated announcement system to offer train running information. Step-free access to both platforms is available via ramps on the footbridge from the entrance and car park.

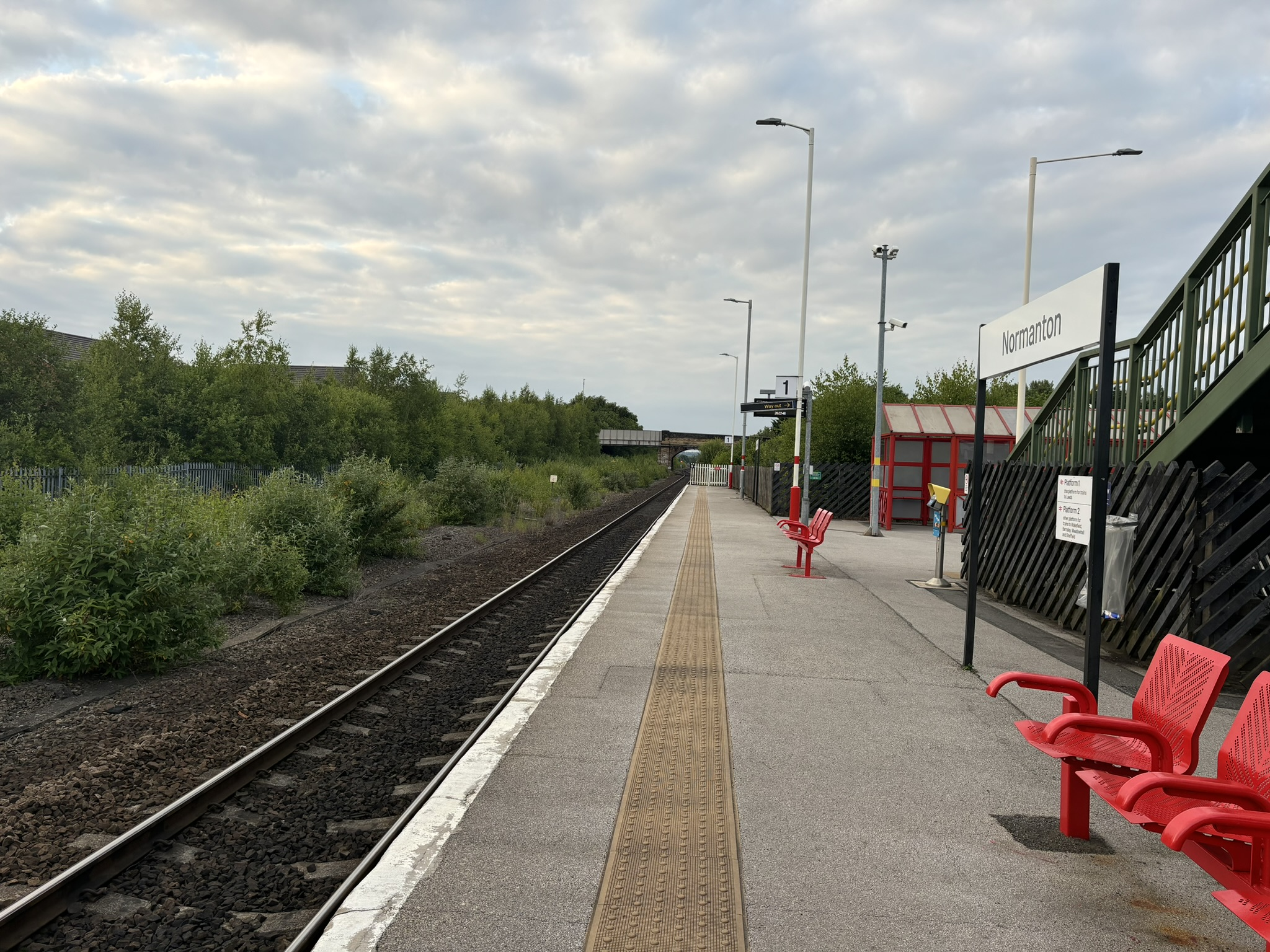
Platform 1

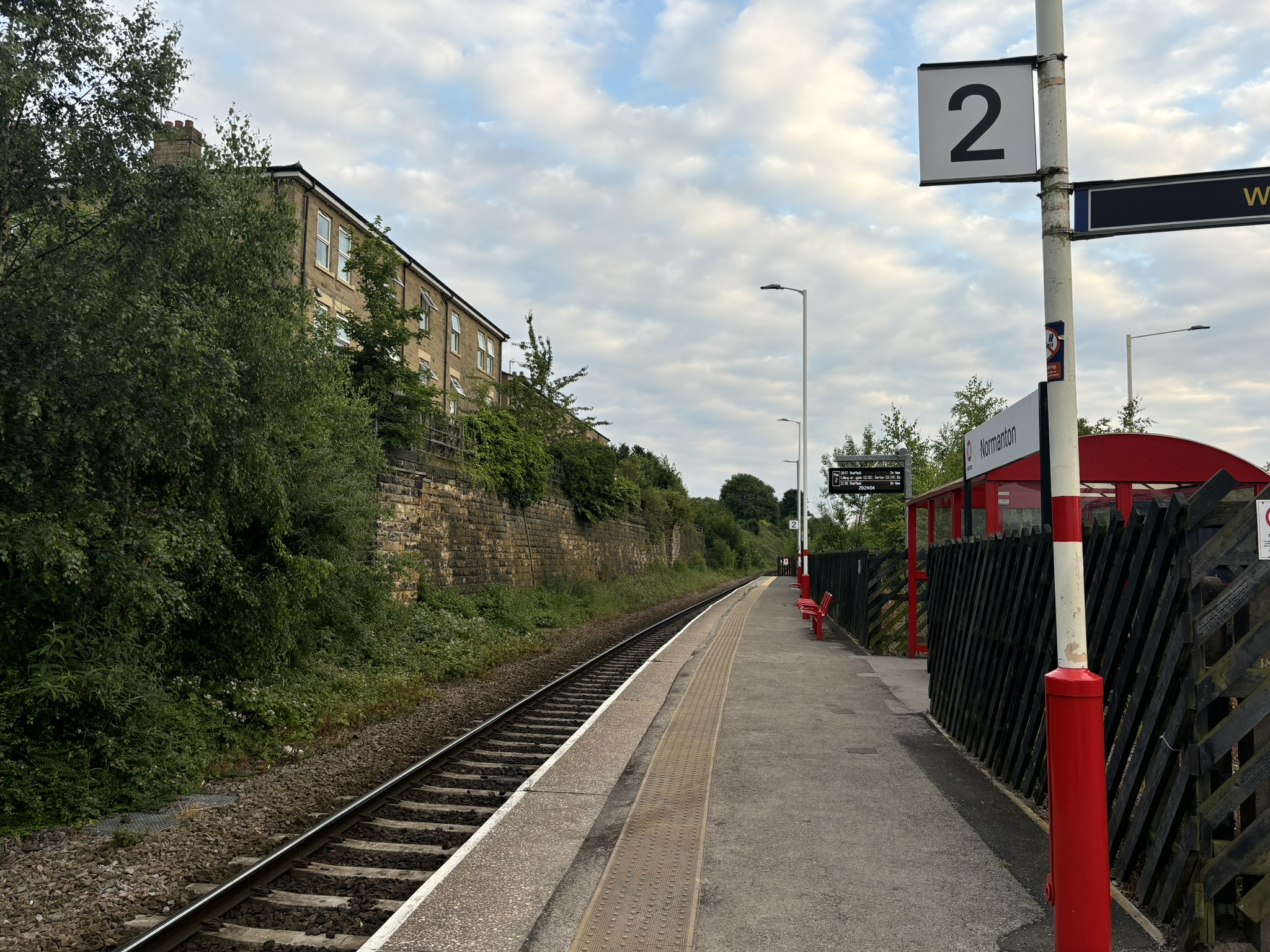
Platform 2

Northbound trains leave from Platform 1 (towards Castleford, Woodlesford and Leeds or Castleford and York) and southbound trains leave from Platform 2 (towards Wakefield Kirkgate, Barnsley and Sheffield (and beyond) or Huddersfield and Manchester Piccadilly).

=== Car Park ===
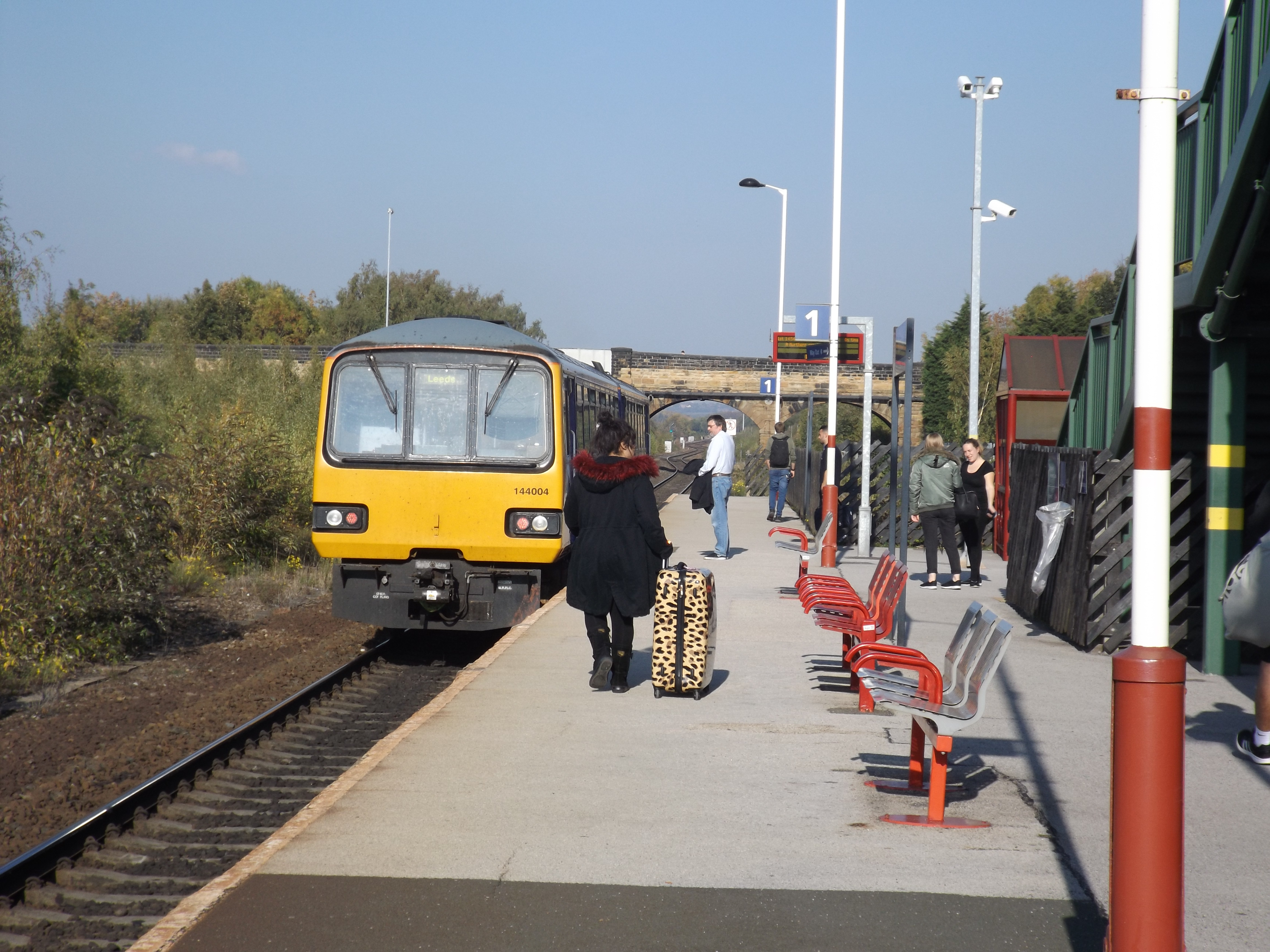
a Northern Rail class 144 (144004) arriving at platform 1.

A 52-space free to use car park is in place at Normanton station. From July 2023, the car park was reduced to 10 spaces whilst work is undertaken to create 128 new spaces, taking the total to 180. The work was due to be complete in July 2024, but as of October 2024, the work was still ongoing.

== Services ==
Northern Trains

On Mondays to Saturdays the station receives an hourly service to Leeds via Castleford and to Sheffield via Wakefield Kirkgate, with extra trains to/from Nottingham or Lincoln Central during peak times. On Sundays, there is a two-hourly service each way.

TransPennine Express

Since December 2024 TransPennine Express have operated hourly each way (including Sundays) between Manchester Piccadilly and York via Huddersfield and Castleford.

Preceding station	National Rail	Following station
Wakefield Kirkgate	Northern Hallam Line	Castleford
Wakefield Kirkgate	TransPennine Express North TransPennine	Castleford
Historical railways
Oakenshaw Line closed, station closed	Midland Railway North Midland Railway	Altofts and Whitwood Line open, station closed
Wakefield Kirkgate; Line and station open	Lancashire and Yorkshire Railway; Manchester and Leeds Railway	Leeds Wellington; Line and station closed
Wakefield Kirkgate; Line and station open	Lancashire and Yorkshire Railway; Manchester and Leeds Railway	York; Line and station open
Terminus	North Eastern Railway; York and North Midland Railway	Castleford; Line and station open
