= Leeds Hunslet Lane railway station =

Disused railway station in West Yorkshire, England

Leeds Hunslet Lane

General information
- Location: Leeds, City of Leeds; England
- Coordinates: 53.788880°N 1.540280°W
- Grid reference: SE303326

Other information
- Status: Disused

History
- Original company: North Midland Railway

Key dates
- 1 July 1840: Station opened as Leeds
- 1 January 1849: renamed Leeds Hunslet Lane
- 1 March 1851: Station closed
Location

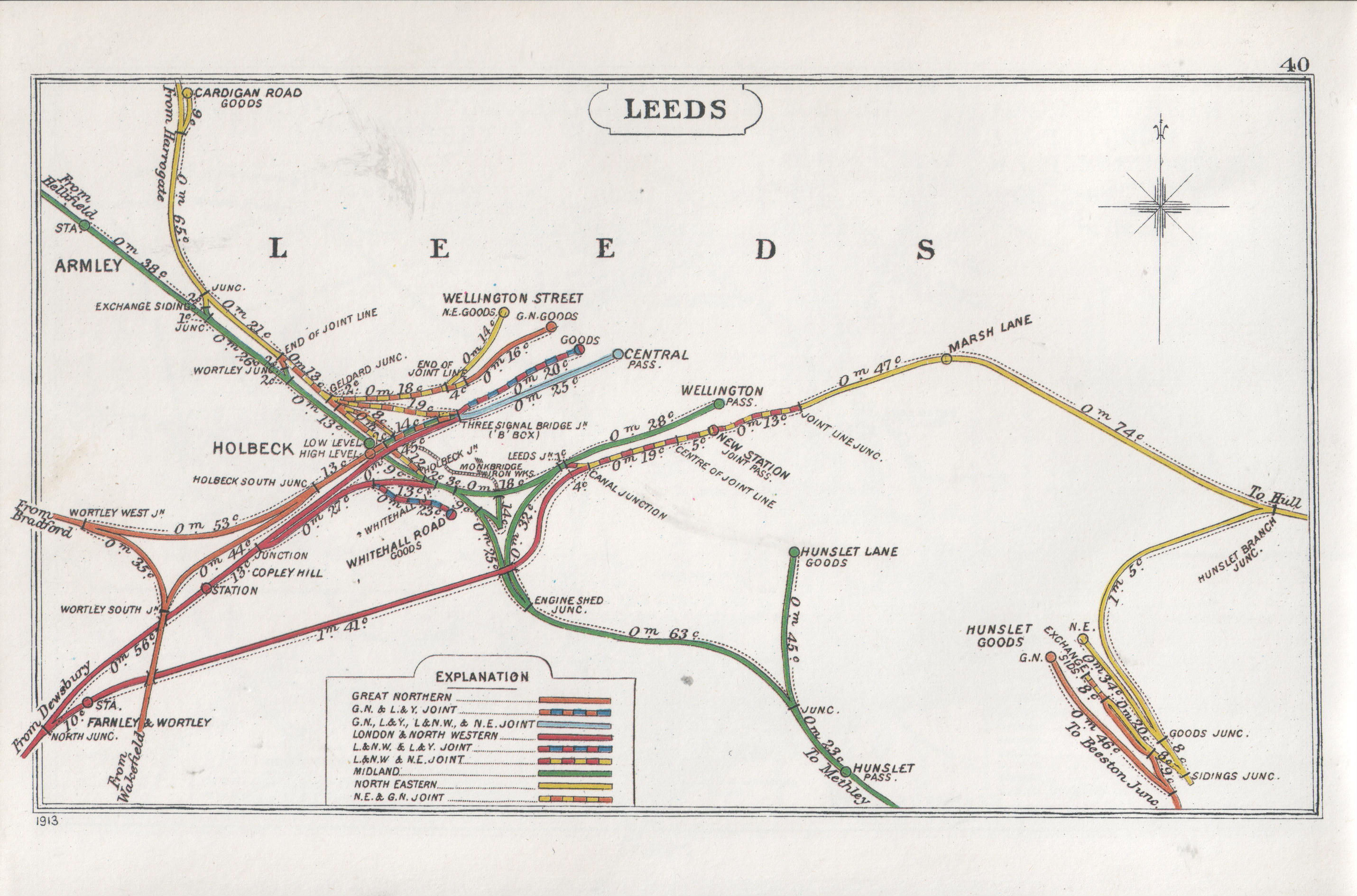
Railway Clearing House diagram of lines in Leeds in 1913. Hunslet Lane (by this time a goods station) is shown in green in the lower centre.

Leeds Hunslet Lane railway station was opened by the North Midland Railway in Leeds in 1840 in what was then a middle-class area, south of the city.

Designed by Francis Thompson, the trainshed consisted of an iron roof in four spans, with five lines running into it. Three of the lines were used for stabling carriages not in use under the central span, and each outer span had one line with a platform 300 yards (274 m) long. Turntables were provided at each end and the offices on the western side were fronted by an arcade with an arch surmounted with the arms of Leeds, Sheffield and Derby.

It was shared by the Manchester and Leeds Railway, which ran on the NMR tracks from just north of Normanton since Parliament had refused to sanction two lines running side by side.

It was replaced by the Midland Railway in 1846 by Leeds Wellington railway station and became a goods depot which closed in 1972. The site is now occupied by the Crown Point Retail Park, which opened in 1989.

Preceding station	Historical railways	Following station
Woodlesford	North Midland Railway; Midland Railway	Terminus
