= Royton Junction railway station =

Former railway station in England

Royton Junction
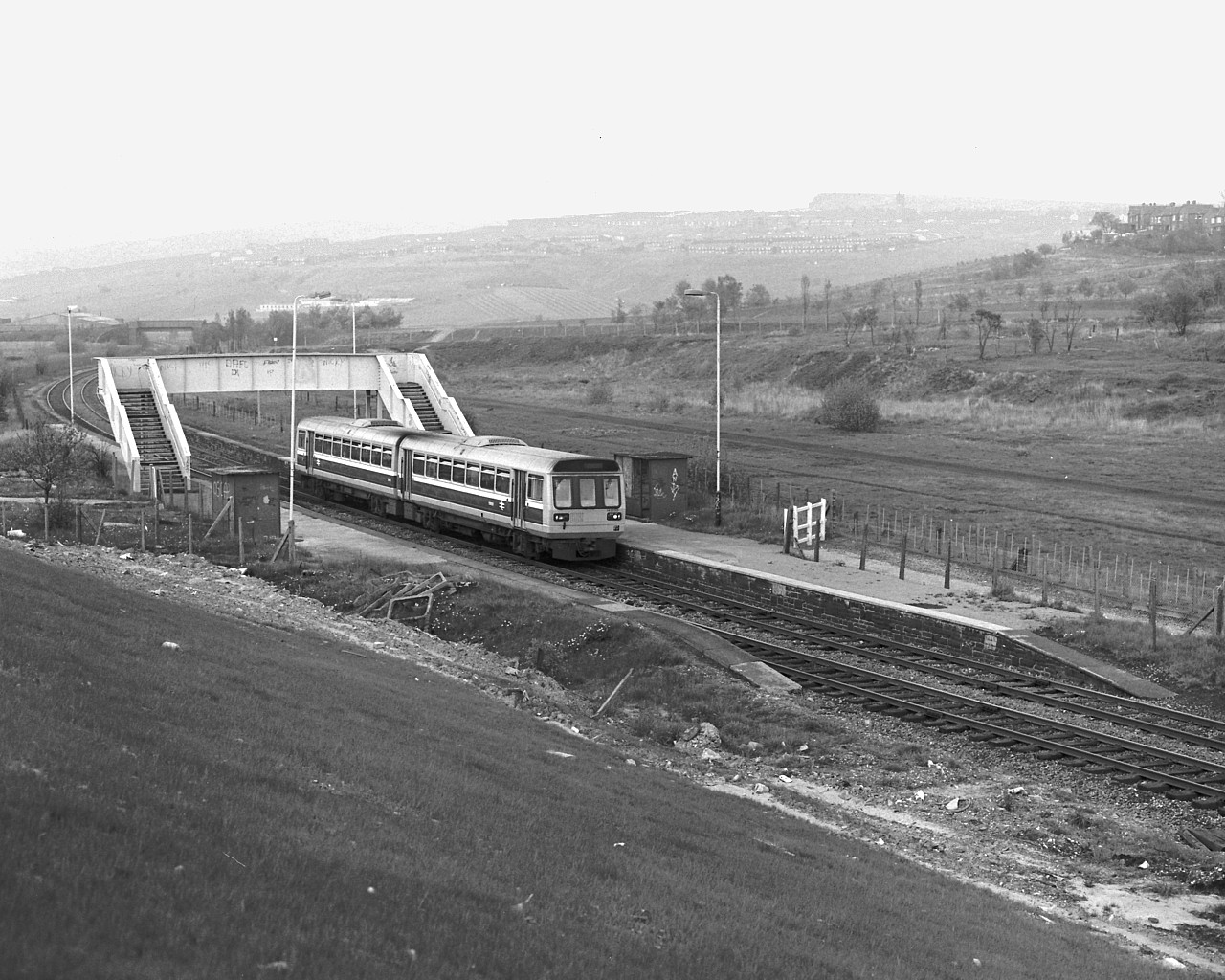

General information
- Location: Higginshaw, Oldham; England
- Coordinates: 53.55426°N 2.10170°W
- Grid reference: SD934064

Other information
- Status: Disused

History
- Original company: Lancashire and Yorkshire Railway
- Pre-grouping: Lancashire and Yorkshire Railway
- Post-grouping: London, Midland and Scottish Railway

Key dates
- 1 July 1864: Opened as Royton Junction
- 8 May 1978: Renamed Royton
- 11 May 1987: Closed
Location

Royton Junction railway station was a station on the Oldham Loop Line in Greater Manchester, England. It opened on 1 July 1864, and was the junction for the short branch line to Royton railway station. The line to Royton was closed to goods on 2 November 1964, and to passengers on 16 April 1966. A 450-yard section of the line remained in use for freight traffic from Royton Junction to Higginshaw Gas Sidings. This final part of the Royton Junction to Royton line closed on 6 April 1970.

The station was renamed Royton on 8 May 1978, and was closed from 11 May 1987. Approval for closure had been given on 8 May 1987, for the station had been replaced by Derker station which opened 1/2 mile (0.8 km) away on 30 August 1985.

Preceding station	Historical railways	Following station
Oldham Mumps	L&YR; Royton branch	Royton
Derker	London Midland Region of British Railways; Oldham Loop Line	Shaw and Crompton
