= Mills Hill railway station =

Railway station in Greater Manchester, England

Mills Hill
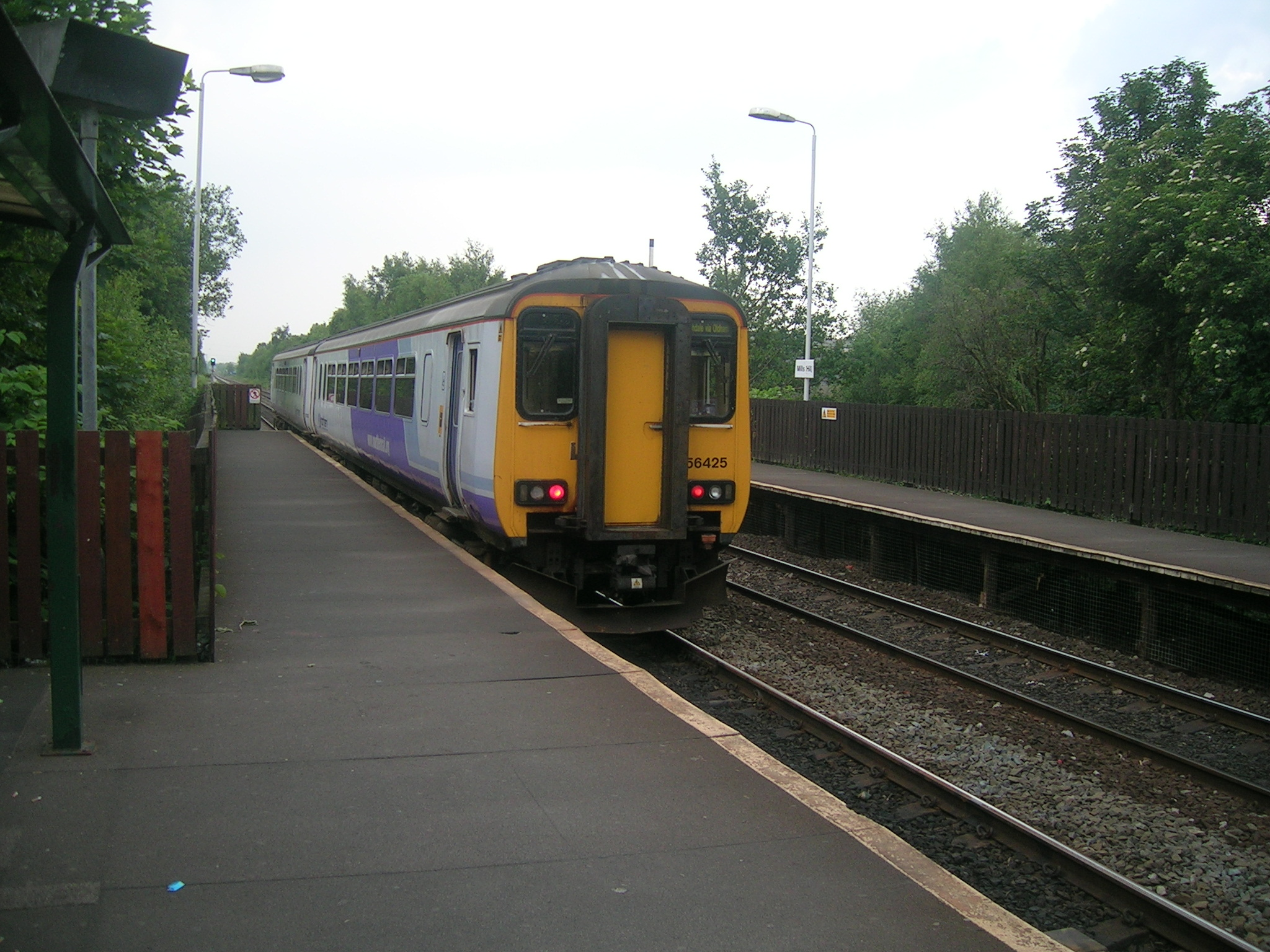

General information
- Location: Middleton, Rochdale; England
- Coordinates: 53.5511°N 2.1717°W
- Grid reference: SD887060
- Managed by: Northern
- Transit authority: Greater Manchester
- Platforms: 2

Other information
- Station code: MIH
- Classification: DfT category F1

History
- Original company: Manchester and Leeds Railway

Key dates
- 4 July 1839: Original station opened
- 11 August 1842: Closed
- 25 March 1985: Current station opened

Passengers
- 2020/21: ▼63,700
- 2021/22: ▲0.190 million
- 2022/23: ▲0.242 million
- 2023/24: ▲0.298 million
- 2024/25: ▲0.304 million
Location
Notes
- Passenger statistics from the Office of Rail and Road

Mills Hill railway station is in the Mills Hill area of Middleton in the Metropolitan Borough of Rochdale, in Greater Manchester, England. The station is 5¾ miles (9 km) north of Manchester Victoria on the Caldervale Line. Mills Hill lies on Middleton's common boundary with Chadderton, and thus serves both communities.

During the temporary closure of the Oldham Loop line for its conversion to Metrolink light rail (2009–12) the station acted as an informal railhead for much of the borough of Oldham.

With an annual patronage of 314,000 entries and exits per year Mills Hill station is the second busiest unstaffed railway station within Transport for Greater Manchester's area. It is due to this fact that TfGM are pushing for funding to be made available to improve accessibility at the station for disabled passengers. The station is second only to Greenfield Railway Station on the prioritized list for this funding.

== History ==
The original station opened on 4 July 1839 before the completion of the branches to Middleton and Oldham, and closed on 11 August 1842 when these were opened. The current station opened on 25 March 1985 by British Rail at the same point as the original.

== Services ==
Since the May 2018 timetable change, the service pattern here has been completely revamped (though the half-hourly basic frequency remains unaltered). All trains (apart from a small number of weekday peak and late evening workings) run to/from Rochdale only, with passengers for destinations further north having to change there. Southbound trains still run to Manchester Victoria, with most continuing on to Bolton and Blackburn/Clitheroe via Darwen.

On Sundays, an hourly service operates with trains running to Southport via Wigan Wallgate southbound and to Blackburn via Todmorden and Burnley Manchester Road northbound.

Preceding station	National Rail	Following station
Moston	Northern; Caldervale Line or Todmorden/Rochdale-Kirkby-Wigan Wallgate	Castleton
	Historical railways	
Middleton Junction; Line open, station closed	Lancashire and Yorkshire Railway	Castleton; Line and station open
	Disused railways	
Middleton Junction; Line open, station closed	Lancashire and Yorkshire Railway	Heywood; Line closed, station open

As part of the Great North Rail Project by Network Rail, a ramp and lift will be installed for disabled access to the station.
