= Middleton railway station (England) =

Former railway station in Greater Manchester, England

Middleton

General information
- Location: Middleton, Metropolitan Borough of Rochdale, England
- Coordinates: 53.5490°N 2.1917°W
- Platforms: 2

Other information
- Status: Disused

History
- Original company: Lancashire and Yorkshire Railway
- Pre-grouping: Lancashire and Yorkshire Railway
- Post-grouping: London, Midland and Scottish Railway

Key dates
- 1 May 1857: Opened
- 7 September 1964: Closed to passengers
- 11 October 1965: Closed for freight
Location

Middleton railway station served the town of Middleton, in Lancashire (now Greater Manchester), England, between 1857 and 1965. It was a stop on the Lancashire and Yorkshire Railway (L&YR).

== History ==
The station was opened on 5 January 1857, when the L&YR opened a branch line to serve the town from Middleton Junction.

It was located to the south-east of the junction of Oldham Road (now the A669) and Townley Street.

Originally, the station had a single platform but was rebuilt with two in 1885-86. There were goods lines on both sides of the main running lines and a goods shed to the south. The goods yard was able to accommodate most types of goods including live stock and was equipped with a five-ton crane.

A cotton shed, described on the map as a goods shed, opened in about 1907; it had a railway link into Neva Cotton Mills.

The station was closed to passengers on 7 September 1964 and completely on 11 October 1965 when the branch also closed.

Preceding station	Disused railways	Following station
Middleton Junction	Lancashire & Yorkshire Railway; Middleton branch	Terminus
