= Miles Platting railway station =

Former railway station in Manchester, England

Coordinates: 53.4971°N 2.2103°W

Miles Platting
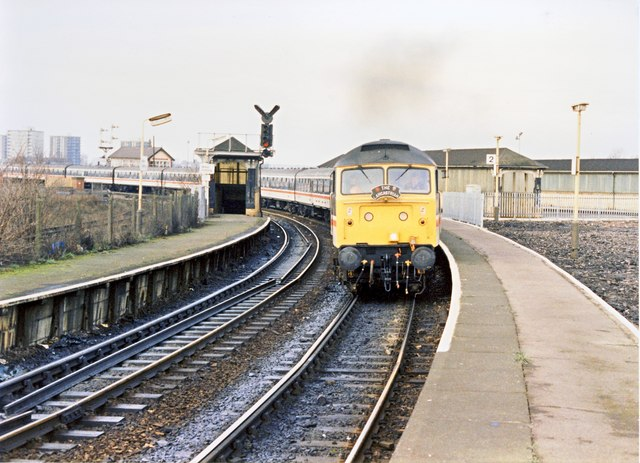
- Miles Platting railway station in 1989

General information
- Location: Miles Platting, Manchester; England
- Grid reference: SD860000
- Platforms: 4

Other information
- Status: Disused

History
- Original company: Manchester and Leeds Railway
- Pre-grouping: Lancashire and Yorkshire Railway
- Post-grouping: London, Midland and Scottish Railway

Key dates
- 1 January 1844: Opened
- 27 May 1995: Closed
Location

Miles Platting railway station served the district of Miles Platting in Manchester from 1844 until closure on 27 May 1995. The station was opened on 1 January 1844 by the Manchester and Leeds Railway; after amalgamating with other railways, this became the Lancashire and Yorkshire Railway in 1847. The station was situated at the junction of the lines to Stalybridge (opened 1846) and Rochdale (opened 1839), and had platforms on both routes. Little trace remains of the station today, as the platforms were removed and the buildings demolished after closure. However, a length of platform awning has been re-erected at Ramsbottom station on the preserved East Lancs Railway.

Preceding station	Historical railways	Following station
Manchester Victoria; Line and station open	L&YR; Caldervale Line	Newton Heath; Line open, station closed
Manchester Victoria; Line and station open	L&YR; Huddersfield Line	Park; Line open, station closed
Manchester Victoria; Line and station open	L&YR; Oldham Loop Line	Dean Lane; Line and station closed
