= Oldham Werneth railway station =

Former railway station in England

Oldham Werneth
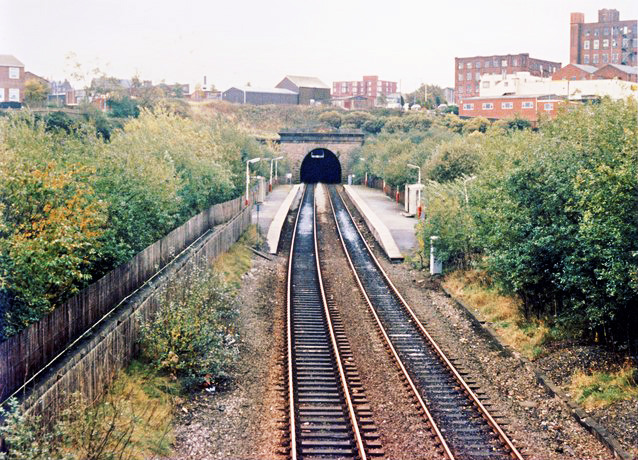
- Oldham Werneth railway station in 1988

General information
- Location: Werneth, Oldham; England
- Coordinates: 53.5389°N 2.1281°W
- Grid reference: SD915047
- Platforms: 2

Other information
- Status: Disused

History
- Original company: Lancashire and Yorkshire Railway
- Pre-grouping: Lancashire and Yorkshire Railway
- Post-grouping: London Midland and Scottish Railway

Key dates
- 31 March 1842: Opened as Oldham
- c.1849: Renamed Oldham Werneth
- 3 October 2009: Closed

Passengers
- 2004/05: 38,804
- 2005/06: ▼38,409
- 2006/07: ▼35,006
- 2007/08: ▲38,248
- 2008/09: ▲55,908
Location
Notes
- Passenger statistics from the Office of Rail and Road

Oldham Werneth railway station was situated on the Oldham Loop Line, 6 1/4 miles (10 km) northeast of Manchester Victoria. The station was situated on Featherstall Road South, in the Werneth area of Oldham, in Greater Manchester, England. Opened on 31 March 1842 it was the oldest of the six railway stations that at one time existed in Oldham.

It predominantly served local Chadderton, Westwood and Werneth residents. The station was operated and served by Northern Rail.

The station was built originally to serve the Platt Bros. of Oldham, a huge cotton spinning engineering company, who had their headquarters in Werneth. However, this company no longer exists.

The Middleton Junction and Oldham Branch Railway formerly ran from Werneth Station down to Middleton Junction. The line included the Werneth Incline which had a gradient of 1 in 27, and was one of the steepest stretches of line regularly used for passenger traffic in the country. The branch line closed on 7 January 1963.

The Oldham Werneth to Thorpes Bridge Junction, Newton Heath line which opened on 17 May 1880 was built to avoid the Werneth Incline. It approached Werneth station from the Manchester direction on a separate two track formation adjacent to the Incline. There was a flat junction between the two lines just beyond Werneth Signal Box and close to the platform ends of the station.

Access to the platforms was through walkways connected to Featherstall Lane, west for the platforms.

On 3 October 2009, the Oldham Loop Line closed, with the line being converted to light rail service (forming the Oldham and Rochdale Line of Manchester Metrolink). The station was not retained for use by Metrolink, but the old line was temporarily used while the tram line through Oldham town centre was built. The new tram line diverges just west of the old Werneth station.

As Oldham Mumps was retained as a temporary tram stop during the construction of the Oldham town centre line (completed in 2014), Oldham Werneth was the only heavy-rail station not to be re-used by Metrolink.

The area is now served by the nearby Westwood and Freehold tram stops.

The site where the platforms used to be has been overbuilt, and is now (November 2022) occupied by a logistics company.

== Old line ==
The Oldham Loop line, closed 3 October 2009. Stations, anticlockwise from Manchester:

- Dean Lane
- Failsworth
- Hollinwood
- Oldham Werneth
- Oldham Mumps
- Derker
- Shaw and Crompton
- Newhey
- Milnrow

Preceding station	Historical railways	Following station
Hollinwood	Lancashire and Yorkshire Railway; Oldham Loop Line	Oldham Central
	Disused railways	
Middleton Junction	Lancashire and Yorkshire Railway; Werneth Incline	Oldham Central
