= Middleton Junction railway station =

Former railway station in England

Middleton Junction
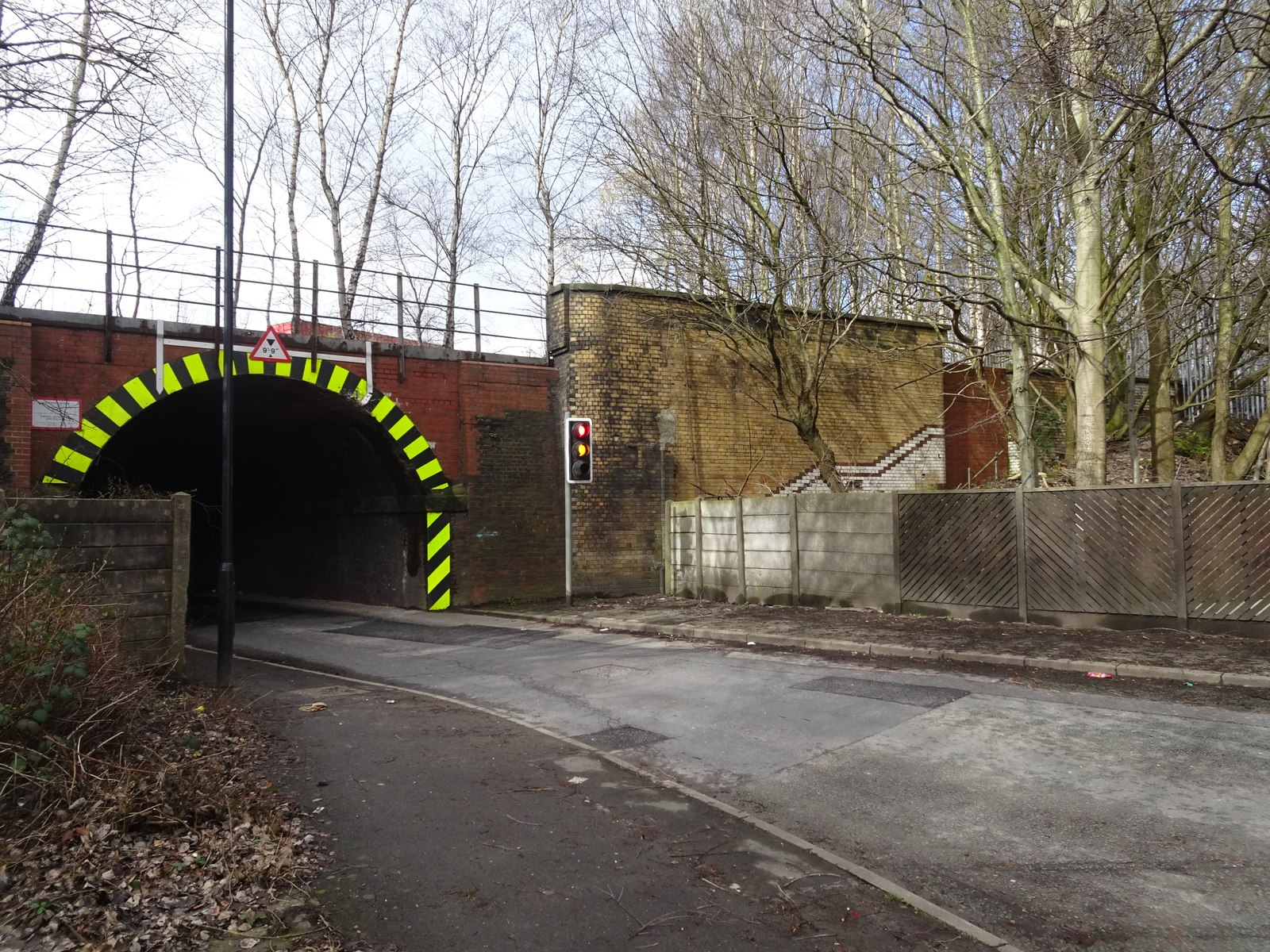
- The site of the station looking north west from Grimshaw Lane. The southern end of the former platforms were just to the right of the bridge.

General information
- Location: Oldham; England
- Coordinates: 53.5408°N 2.1704°W
- Grid reference: SD887048
- Platforms: 4

Other information
- Status: Disused

History
- Original company: Manchester and Leeds Railway
- Pre-grouping: Lancashire and Yorkshire Railway
- Post-grouping: London, Midland and Scottish Railway

Key dates
- 31 March 1842: Opened as Oldham Junction
- 11 August 1842: Renamed as Middleton
- 1852: Renamed as Middleton Junction
- 3 January 1966: Closed to passengers
- 7 November 1966: Closed for freight
Location

Middleton Junction railway station was an early junction station on the Manchester and Leeds Railway (M&LR), it opened when the branch to Oldham opened in 1842.

The line through station site opened on 4 July 1839 when the Manchester and Leeds Railway opened a railway between Manchester Oldham Road and Littleborough, the first stage of its main line from Manchester to Leeds.

Middleton Junction railway station opened as Oldham Junction on the 31 March 1842 when the M&LR opened the Middleton Junction and Oldham Branch between this new station on the main line and Oldham Werneth. On 11 August 1842 the station was renamed Middleton and in 1852 it started to appear in timetables as Middleton Junction.

The station was located at Lane End in Chadderton, a former hamlet which later adopted the place-name Middleton Junction after the area expanded after the opening of the railway. The station site was immediately north of where Grimshaw Lane (now the B6189) crossed the railway

The station appears to have opened with three platforms, two either side of the mainline and one on the mainline side of the track of the sharply curved branch. The 1848 map shows a building and a few sidings located in the 'v' of the junction.

The station was rebuilt in 1882 and by 1893 there were buildings on all what was now four platforms, two sidings in the 'v' of the junction and a goods yard with a shed to the south west of the mainline. The yard was able to handle livestock and was equipped with a two-ton crane. Further to the south and located on both sides of the main line was Middleton Junction Sidings.

On 5 January 1857 the Lancashire and Yorkshire Railway (L&YR) opened another branch, the Middleton Branch, heading westward immediately to the north of the mainline platforms. The branch had only one station its terminus at Middleton. (Note: The Manchester and Leeds Railway had become the Lancashire and Yorkshire Railway on 9 July 1847.)

On 12 August 1914 a goods and coal depot was opened at Chadderton. This was at the end of a 1,097-yard (1,003 m) long line which branched off the Oldham line approximately 400 yards (370 m) from Middleton Junction at Chadderton Junction.

The line from Chadderton Junction to Oldham was closed to regular passengers in 1958 although some diverted services used it in 1960 and completely on 7 January 1963.

The branch line to Middleton closed to passengers on 7 September 1964 and completely on 11 October 1965.

The line through the site is still open but the station closed to passengers on 3 January 1966.

The Chadderton goods and coal depot remained open and in use until 1988 (the track was eventually lifted in September 1991).

== Bibliography ==
- Bairstow, Martin (2001). Manchester & Leeds Railway: the Calder Valley line. ISBN 978-1-871944-22-8.
- Brown, Joe (2021). Liverpool & Manchester Railway Atlas. Manchester: Crécy Publishing. ISBN 9780860936879. OCLC 1112373294.
- Grant, Donald J. (2017). Directory of the Railway Companies of Great Britain (1st ed.). Kibworth Beauchamp, Leicestershire: Troubador Publishing Ltd. ISBN 978-1-78803-768-6.
- Hooper, John (1991). An Illustrated History of Oldham's Railways. Pinner, Middlesex: Irwell Press. ISBN 9781871608199. OCLC 650187960. Most of the pages in this publication have no page numbers
- Marshall, John (1970). The Lancashire & Yorkshire Railway. Vol. 2. Newton Abbot: David & Charles. ISBN 978-0-7153-4906-9.
- Marshall, John (1981). Forgotten Railways:North-West England. David & Charles. ISBN 0-7153-8003-6.
- Quick, Michael (2022) [2001]. Railway passenger stations in Great Britain: a chronology (PDF) (5th revised to July 2022 (5.04) ed.). Railway & Canal Historical Society.
- The Railway Clearing House (1970) [1904]. The Railway Clearing House Handbook of Railway Stations 1904 (1970 D&C Reprint ed.). Newton Abbot: David & Charles Reprints. ISBN 0-7153-5120-6.

Preceding station	Historical railways	Following station
Manchester Oldham Road to 1844; Line and station closed Miles Platting; 1844–1853; Line open, station closed Newton Heath; 1853–1872; Line open, station closed Moston from 1872; Line and station open	L&YR; Middleton branch	Middleton; Line and station closed
Manchester Oldham Road to 1844; Line and station closed Miles Platting; 1844–1853; Line open, station closed Newton Heath; 1853–1872; Line open, station closed Moston from 1872; Line and station open	L&YR; Caldervale Line	Mills Hill; Line and station open
Manchester Oldham Road to 1844; Line and station closed Miles Platting; 1844–1853; Line open, station closed Newton Heath; 1853–1872; Line open, station closed Moston from 1872; Line and station open	L&YR; Middleton Junction and Oldham Branch	Oldham Werneth; Line and station closed
