= Manchester and Leeds Railway =

Former British railway company

Overview
- Headquarters: Manchester
- Locale: Lancashire and Yorkshire
- Dates of operation: 4 July 1836–9 July 1847
- Successor: Lancashire and Yorkshire Railway

Technical
- Track gauge: 4 ft 9 in (1,448 mm)

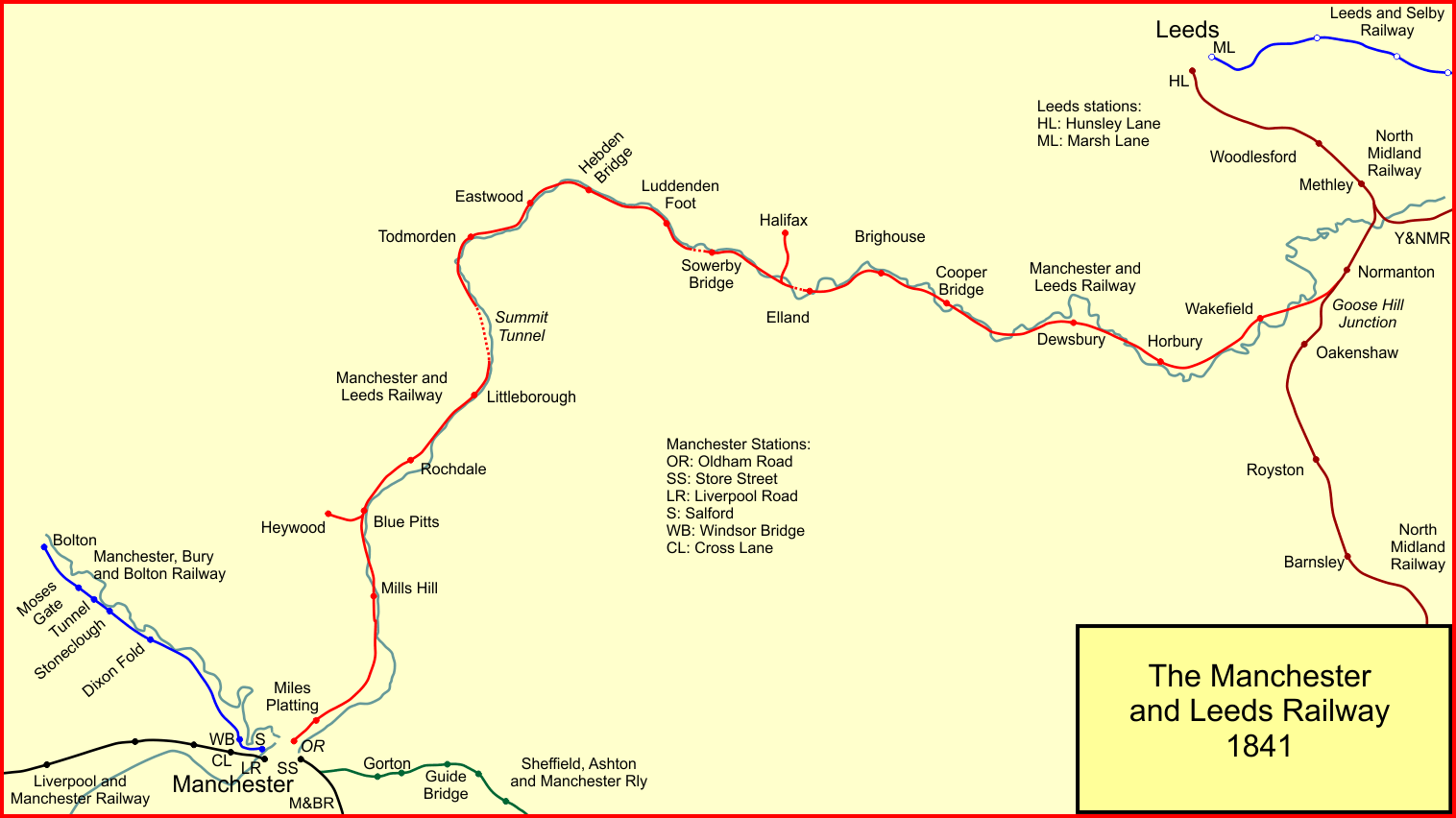
The Manchester and Leeds Railway in 1841

The Manchester and Leeds Railway was a British railway company that built a line from Manchester to Normanton where it made a junction with the North Midland Railway, over which it relied on running powers to access Leeds. The line followed the valley of the River Calder for much of the way, making for easier gradients but by-passing many important manufacturing towns. Crossing the watershed between Lancashire and Yorkshire required a long tunnel. The line opened throughout in 1841.

Early on, the company realised that the initial route required expansion, and branches were built by the company or by new, sponsored companies. In Manchester steps were taken to make a railway connection with the Liverpool and Manchester Railway, and a connecting line was built, including an important joint passenger station, named Victoria station.

The pace of expansion accelerated, and in 1846 it was clear that the company's name was no longer appropriate, and the opportunity was taken, when getting parliamentary authority for further amalgamations, to change the name to the Lancashire and Yorkshire Railway; this took effect by an act of Parliament, the Manchester and Leeds Railway Act (No. 3) 1847 (10 & 11 Vict. c. clxiii) of 9 July 1847. From that time, coupled with the considerable expansion of the network, the Lancashire and Yorkshire Railway took on a new dynamic..

== Conception ==
Proposals to build a railway from Manchester to Leeds originated at about the same time as those for the Liverpool and Manchester Railway and a company was formed in 1825 but despite the involvement of George Stephenson, the scheme was abandoned, and a reintroduced scheme in 1831 also failed to gain approval.

In 1835, the company was reconstituted with capital fixed at £800,000; Stephenson was again appointed chief engineer, and plans were deposited for the following parliamentary session. The 51-mile (82 km) route was altered from the earlier proposals to run via Wakefield to Normanton to join the North Midland Railway over which it would have running powers from Normanton into Leeds. The eastward diversion was to form easier gradients than previously proposed, but nearer Manchester there were three inclines, each about 4 miles (6 km) long at 1 in 165 and 1 in 130. In 10 miles (16 km) from Manchester the line would climb 358 feet (109 m) to a tunnel, 1,705 yards (1,559 m) long, and two other tunnels of 126 yd (115 m) and 280 yd (260 m). Normanton is some distance east of Wakefield and not the direct route towards Leeds. Running powers over 9 miles (14 km) of the North Midland Railway to Leeds were given and a clause in the act that should the North Midland Railway fail to build its line, the Manchester and Leeds Railway would have the power to do so.

Manchester and Leeds Railway Act 1836
- Act of Parliament
- Parliament of the United Kingdom
- Long title: An Act for making a Railway from Manchester to Leeds.
- Citation: 6 & 7 Will. 4. c. cxi
- Territorial extent: United Kingdom

Dates
- Royal assent: 4 July 1836

Other legislation
- Relates to: Aire and Calder Navigation Act 1820; Aire and Calder Navigation Act 1828

Manchester and Leeds Railway Act 1837
- Act of Parliament
- Parliament of the United Kingdom
- Long title: An Act for enabling the Manchester and Leeds Railway Company to vary the Line of such Railway, and for amending and enlarging the Powers and Provision of the Act relating thereto.
- Citation: 7 Will. 4 & 1 Vict. c. xxiv

Dates
- Royal assent: 5 May 1837

Text of statute as originally enacted

The Manchester and Leeds Railway Act 1836 (6 & 7 Will. 4. c. cxi) was given royal assent on 4 July 1836. Authorised share capital was £1,300,000. The Manchester and Leeds Railway Act 1837 (7 Will. 4 & 1 Vict. c. xxiv) on 5 May 1837 authorised changes to the route.

== Tunnels ==
Work on the section from Manchester to Littleborough began on 18 August 1837, and on the Summit Tunnel the following year. The tunnel proved much more expensive than planned, and took longer to complete. It was nearly finished in December 1839 when a portion of the invert (Note: In this context, an invert is a flattish inverted arch built under the track when it is suspected that the footings of the main arch may be forced inwards (laterally) by the pressure of bad ground.) failed, allowing the side walls to move by 3/4 inch (19 mm), requiring them to be rebuilt. Stephenson explained the failure by saying

The blue shale through which the excavation passed at that point, was considered so hard and firm, as to render it unnecessary to build the invert very strong there. But shale is always a deceptive material... In this case, falling away like quicklime, it had left the lip of the invert alone to support the pressure of the arch above, and hence its springing inwards and upwards.

At the time of its completion it was the longest railway tunnel in the world, at 2,885 yards (2,638 m). The brickwork varies from five to ten rings in thickness. The total cost of Summit Tunnel was £251,000.

There was a problem at Charlestown Tunnel, between Eastwood and Hebden Bridge. The ground consisted of loose, sandy earth which gave trouble from the start. On 8 June 1840 it was reported that the masonry inside the tunnel was collapsing and eventually, after much further consideration, the tunnel was abandoned and the line built round the hill at ground level on curves of 12 to 15 chains (240 to 300 m) radius.

== Early track ==
Whishaw wrote in 1842,

"The [track] gauge is 4 feet 9 inches [1,448 mm], in order to allow 1/4 of an inch [6.4 mm] play on either side for the wheels of the locomotives and carriages. (Note: Templeton said the same thing in 1841. With a stone block permanent way this may have been appropriate, and at the speeds of the day irrelevant. The track was relaid, and it is unlikely that this outlier persisted, and there are dangers in quoting this as "the track gauge of the M&L Railway".) The rails are of the single parallel form... They are in 15-foot [4.6 m] lengths, having 3-foot [0.9 m] bearings..." (Note: This means that there were chairs and sleepers at intervals of 3 ft (0.9 m).)

The track consisted of T-section rails, 5 in (13 cm) deep with heads 2 1/2 in (6.4 cm) wide and 1 1/4 in (3.2 cm) deep, weighing 56 pounds per yard (28 kg/m), secured in chairs 10 by 5 in (25 by 13 cm) by means of a 5/8 in (16 mm) diameter ball and key fitted into grooves in each side of the stem of the rail. Sleepers consisted of sandstone blocks of about 4 cubic feet (0.11 m^{3}) each in cuttings, and Kyanised larch sleepers, 9 ft (2.7 m) by 11 in (28 cm) by 5 in (13 cm), on embankments.

== Opening ==
On Wednesday 3 July 1839, the line was formally opened from Manchester to Littleborough and two trains conveying the directors and invited guests ran as far as Summit Tunnel. On the following day the line opened to the public over that section; 3,100 passengers were carried. The fare for the 13 1/2 miles (21.7 km) from Manchester to Littleborough was first class 4s, second class 2s 6d, and third class 6d. The chief booking clerk at Manchester was Thomas Edmondson who had invented a machine for printing railway tickets on cards of standard size, numbered progressively, and another machine for stamping the date on each ticket. Edmondson's ticket system and machines were used into the 1970s, almost identical with those first used on the M&LR in 1839.

The next section that opened was from Normanton to Hebden Bridge on Monday 5 October 1840. The North Midland Railway had opened its line to Leeds, using its own terminus at Hunslet Lane on 30 July. As the eastern end of the M&LR was isolated by the uncompleted Summit Tunnel, the NMR provided locomotives for this section until the line was completed. Passengers could now book from Manchester to Leeds, the journey from Littleborough to Hebden Bridge was made in road coaches provided by the company.

The line from Hebden Bridge to Summit tunnel opened on 31 December 1840. When Summit Tunnel was completed, the line was inspected by Sir Frederick Smith who sanctioned its opening to the public on behalf of the Board of Trade in February 1841. The main line opening took place on Monday 1 March 1841. The timetabled four trains each way on Sundays encountered strong opposition from religious bodies. The board was divided and the chairman and two directors resigned in protest against running Sunday trains.

== First train services ==
The first timetable showed nine passenger trains each way except Sundays when there were four. The first weekday eastbound train started from Sowerby Bridge. The trains alternated between all stations and semi-fast, the latter calling at eight intermediate stations compared with 15 intermediate stops for all-stations trains. The stopping trains took about 3 hours and 20 minutes to and from Leeds, the semi-fast trains took 2 hours and 45 minutes.

The fact that the line by-passed many important towns is emphasised by the notes in the timetable: Mills Hill (for Oldham); Blue Pitts (for Heywood); Todmorden (for Burnley); Sowerby Bridge (for Halifax); Brighouse (for Bradford); and Cooper Bridge (for Huddersfield).

The M&LR quickly achieved a high profit level, owing to the density of population along the route and the fact that in the early years much southbound traffic from Manchester was routed this way owing to disputes affecting the Grand Junction Railway.

In July 1844, the M&LR seized all the Midland Railway (Note: The Midland Railway was established on 10 May 1844, amalgamating the North Midland Railway and others.) goods wagons on its system in order to run a cheap excursion from Dewsbury to Liverpool—at the time a commonplace form of accommodation. The Midland reacted by taking all the M&LR wagons it could find and moving them to Derby.

On 16 September 1847, a train headed by a 2-2-2 engine was derailed by a broken rail at Sowerby Bridge, killing two passengers and injuring one. In his report Captain J L A Simmons, the government inspector, strongly condemned the permanent way. Over a distance of 410 yards (370 m) the chairs had worked loose in the stone blocks, the gauge varied by up to 1 inch (2.5 cm) each way and the rails were badly worn. Between 1844 and 1846, some 17 1/2 miles (28 km) of line had been relaid with 80 lb/yd (40 kg/m) double-head rails in chairs, but much remained to be done.

== Manchester Victoria Station ==
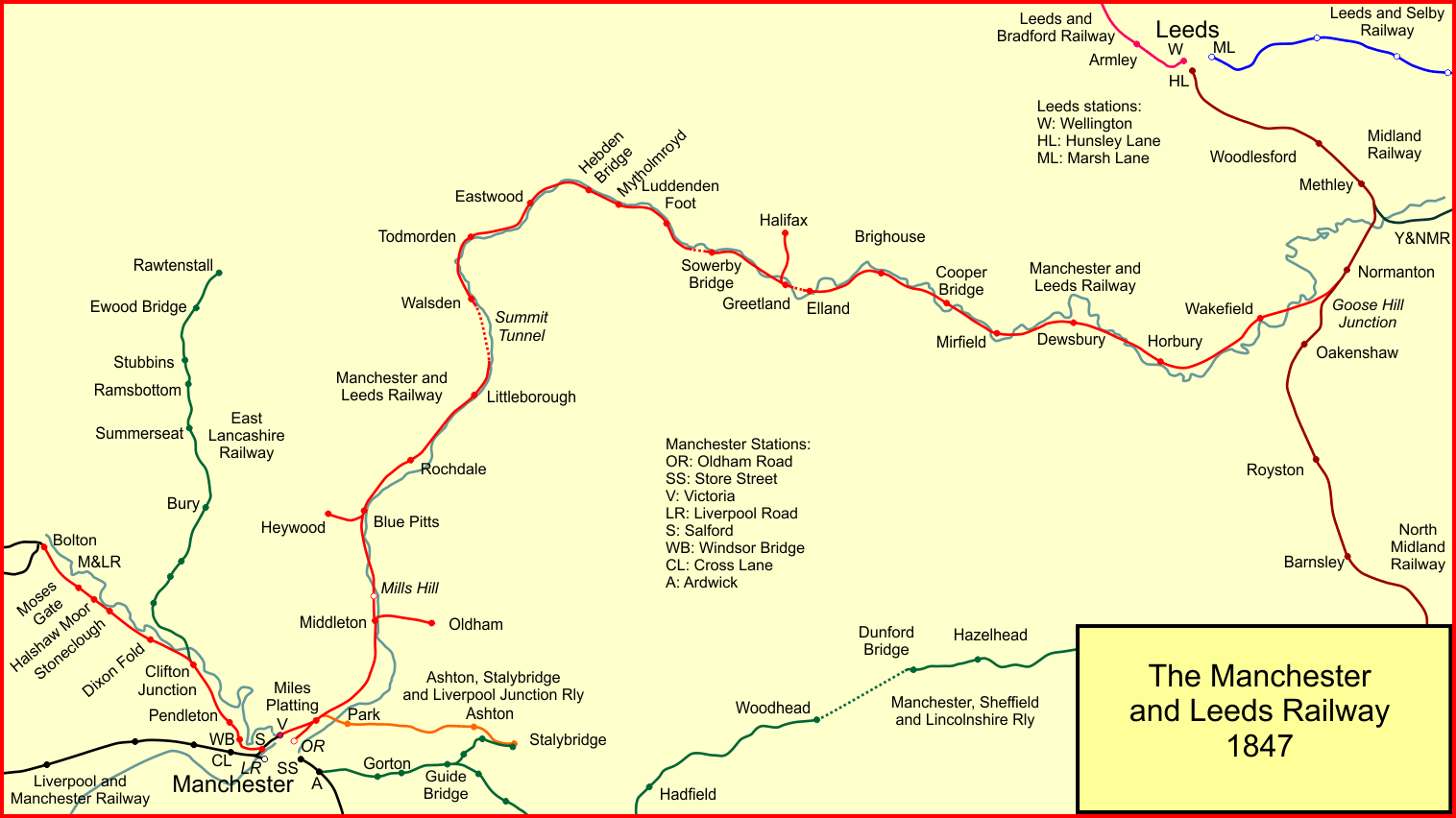
The Manchester and Leeds Railway in 1847

Manchester and Leeds Railway Act 1839
- Act of Parliament
- Parliament of the United Kingdom
- Long title: An Act for extending and for altering the Line of the Manchester and Leeds Railway, and for making Branches therefrom; and for amending the Acts relating thereto.
- Citation: 2 & 3 Vict. c. lv

Dates
- Royal assent: 1 July 1839

Text of statute as originally enacted

After the opening of the Leeds to Manchester line, only the gap between the M&LR's Oldham Road station and the L&MR's Liverpool Road terminus in Manchester, prevented there being a through line from Liverpool to Hull. As well as the inconvenience to passengers, goods had to be unloaded and carted across Manchester and reloaded into railway wagons. The companies agreed to make a connecting line from the M&LR at Miles Platting to a new station at Hunt's Bank and on to the terminus of the Manchester and Bolton Railway (close to the present-day Salford Central station) and over an S-shaped link to join the L&MR to the west of its terminus in July 1838. The Hunt's Bank site was purchased privately by Samuel Brooks, vice-chairman of the M&LR, and presented to the company in August 1838. The section from Miles Platting to Hunt's Bank was built by the M&LR, and the western section by the L&MR. Royal assent was given to the Liverpool and Manchester Railway Act 1839 (2 & 3 Vict. c. xli) for this arrangement on 14 June 1839, followed by an Manchester and Leeds Railway Act 1839 (2 & 3 Vict. c. lv) on 1 July, which also authorised branches to Oldham and Halifax. There was considerable controversy because a southern route was strongly advocated; the L&MR in particular was attracted to a connection to the Manchester and Birmingham Railway, giving better connections southwards, at the cost of failing to connect the Bolton line at all, and of requiring some form of transshipment for Leeds traffic, because of incompatibility in the levels. It took some time to pacify the dissenters, but the Liverpool and Manchester Railway Act 1842 (5 & 6 Vict. c. cviii) was obtained on 30 July 1842, finalising the matter.

The M&LR part of the construction was beset by accidents, but it was opened on 1 January 1844. The extension descended to Hunt's Bank with gradients from 1 in 47 to 1 in 59. A stationary engine was provided at Miles Platting to work the incline by rope.

The Hunt's Bank station was named Victoria from the beginning, (Note: Some entries in Bradshaw's Guide referred to it as Hunt's Bank and Victoria in different sections of the same edition. A company operating notice of 14 December 1843 calls it "Victoria station at Hunt's Bank near the Exchange.") and at the time of its completion was the largest station in the country. Even so, a single platform was considered sufficient for all the traffic, the west end for the Liverpool trains and the east for the Leeds trains: it was 852 feet (260 m) long.

The trains were hauled up to Miles Platting by a wire rope; descending trains were controlled by brake wagons in front. In the Railway Chronicle, Hawkshaw is reported as saying that the use of the stationary engine had been largely discontinued, the ordinary engines taking up passenger and goods trains weighing over 80 long tons (81 tonnes). It thus seems that the rope haulage might have been in operation for only a year and a half. With the opening of Victoria station, Oldham Road station was closed to passengers after only four and a half years of use, and became a goods station.

== Leeds station ==
The first terminus in Leeds used by the Manchester and Leeds Railway was at Hunslet Lane situated to the south of the city centre and shared with the Midland Railway. In 1846, the Midland Railway transferred most of its services to the centrally situated Wellington Station which was built by the Leeds and Bradford Railway. The Manchester and Leeds Railway stayed at Hunslet Lane after 1846, but diverted most of its trains via the LNWR route through Batley in 1848. This crossed over the Midland Railway's Leeds–Bradford line at Holbeck and terminated at a temporary station, about 1/4 mile (0.4 km) from Wellington, near the site of Leeds Central where the permanent structure was opened about 1851.

== Expansion and branch lines to 1846 ==
When the company obtained its original act of Parliament, the Manchester and Leeds Railway Act 1836, on 4 July 1836, this was for the main line only, between Manchester and Normanton, giving access to Leeds. The main line was complete in 1841; the extension to Victoria station in Manchester followed, being ready in 1844. It was obvious that many other important manufacturing locations were in the general area served by the company, and it began to take steps to connect many of them, by building branches, or later, by absorbing other companies.

=== Heywood branch 1841 ===
Manchester and Leeds Railway Act 1844
- Act of Parliament
- Parliament of the United Kingdom
- Long title: An Act for maintaining a Railway from the Manchester and Leeds Railway to Heywood; and for amending the Acts relating to the Manchester and Leeds Railway.
- Citation: 7 & 8 Vict. c. xvi

Dates
- Royal assent: 10 May 1844

Heywood was an important industrial centre, home to numerous cotton mills and an iron foundry. A 1 3/4-mile (2.8 km) single line branch to Heywood was made, opening on 15 April 1841 without getting parliamentary authorisation, until obtained retrospectively on 10 May 1844 in the Manchester and Leeds Railway Act 1844 (7 & 8 Vict. c. xvi). It left the main line at Castleton, but at the time the locality was known only as Blue Pitts, 2 miles (3.2 km) south-west of Rochdale. It cost £10,000 to build. The branch trains used horse traction, until a locomotive was used on the line from 1 May 1847.

=== Oldham branch 1842 ===
When the Hunt's Bank extension was authorised, an Oldham branch was included in the Manchester and Leeds Railway Act 1839 of 1 July 1839. It opened on 31 March 1842. The line was 2 miles (3.2 km) long, climbing 186 feet (57 m) from a junction on the main line at Middleton; a station there was named Oldham Junction at first. The branch had a gradient of 1 in 27 for more than half the distance. The method of working was devised by Captain Laws, the company General Manager; it used a balancing load of mineral wagons on a reserved track, with a cable passing round a large drum at the head of the incline. This arrangement continued until some time between 1851 and 1856, after which ordinary locomotive working was used.

"There is a steep gradient in this branch of 1 in 27, 1 mile [1.6 km] in length, situated between Middleton Junction and Werneth, Oldham, and a stationary engine was fixed at the top of the incline, with a rope attached to it, for the purpose of pulling up and letting down trains to the bottom of the incline." (Note: This may be an error: Marshall warns us (page 55) that "Normington, however, has to be read cautiously.")

=== Halifax branch 1844 ===
Also authorised in the Manchester and Leeds Railway Act 1839 was a Halifax branch. It too was a short line, 1 3/4 miles (2.8 km) with severe gradients. Its junction with the main line at North Dean (later Greetland) (Note: At the time the locality was referred to as Cooper Bridge.) faced Wakefield. The Halifax station was at Shaw Syke, and the branch opened on 1 July 1844.

=== Bolton and Bury 1846 ===
Through the Manchester, Bolton and Bury Canal Act 1791 (31 Geo. 3. c. 68), the Manchester, Bolton and Bury Canal Company had been created. In 1832, it decided to build a railway beside its canal, changing the company name to the Manchester, Bolton and Bury Canal Navigation and Railway. It never reached Bury, and its "Manchester" terminal was in fact in Salford, and its title is usually shortened to the Manchester and Bolton Railway. The railway opened for public traffic as far as Bolton on 29 May 1838; there were six trains each way on weekdays and two on Sundays.

From May 1844, the MB&BR reached Victoria station over the rails of the Liverpool and Manchester Railway.

The Manchester and Bolton Railway saw that an ally in Manchester was necessary, and after failed talks in 1844, more favourable terms were offered by the M&LR at a meeting on 30 January 1846. An operating agreement came into force on 1 July, and by the Manchester and Leeds Railway (Manchester, Bolton and Bury Canal and Railway) Act 1846 (9 & 10 Vict. c. ccclxxviii) of 18 August 1846, the Bolton company was absorbed by the M&LR.

=== Liverpool and Bury Railway 1846 ===
Industrialists in Bolton and Wigan were dissatisfied with the service offered by the Liverpool and Manchester Railway and they formed what became the Liverpool and Bury Railway. It was authorised on 31 July 1845 to make a 28-mile (45 km) line from a junction at Sandhills, near Liverpool Exchange station, to Bury. The L&BR directors continued to fear coercion by the Liverpool and Manchester Railway, and sought the protection of the Manchester and Leeds Railway; the M&LR was delighted to be gifted a route to Liverpool and amalgamation was quickly agreed. The Manchester and Leeds Railway absorbed it on 1 October 1846 (by an act of Parliament, the Manchester and Leeds Railway (No. 2) Act 1846 (9 & 10 Vict. c. cclxxxii) on 27 July 1846) before it had been completed. It opened for traffic on 20 November 1848, by which time the M&LR had been retitled the Lancashire and Yorkshire Railway.

=== Huddersfield and Sheffield Junction Railway 1846 ===
Huddersfield and Sheffield Junction Railway Act 1845
- Act of Parliament
- Parliament of the United Kingdom
- Long title: An Act for making a Railway from Huddersfield in the West Riding of the County of York to or near Penistone in the same Riding, there to form a Junction with the Sheffield, Ashton-under-Lyne, and Manchester Railway, to be called "The Huddersfield and Sheffield Junction Railway."
- Citation: 8 & 9 Vict. c. xxxix

Dates
- Royal assent: 30 June 1845

This 13-mile (21 km) line was authorised by the Huddersfield and Sheffield Junction Railway Act 1845 (8 & 9 Vict. c. xxxix) on 30 June 1845 to connect Huddersfield with the Sheffield, Ashton-under-Lyne and Manchester Railway (Note: The SA&MR was retitled the Manchester, Sheffield and Lincolnshire Railway from the following year.) near Penistone. There was to be a branch to Holmfirth. Amid considerable political tactics, the unbuilt Huddersfield and Sheffield Junction Railway was absorbed into the Manchester and Leeds Railway on 27 July 1846. The H&SJR opened to the public on 1 July 1850. At first the MS&LR worked the line (as it was disconnected from the M&LR), but in 1870 the L&YR began running Sheffield-Huddersfield trains from Penistone.

=== West Riding Union Railways 1846 ===
West Riding Union Railways Act 1846
- Act of Parliament
- Parliament of the United Kingdom
- Long title: An Act for making certain Lines of Railway in the West Riding of the County of York, to be called "The West Riding Union Railways."
- Citation: 9 & 10 Vict. c. cccxc

Dates
- Royal assent: 18 August 1846

Text of statute as originally enacted

The West Riding Union Railways Company was formed in 1846 from the wreckage of George Hudson's duplicity; he had promised to promote a southward line from Bradford to Halifax and elsewhere. The West Riding Union Railways Act 1846 (9 & 10 Vict. c. cccxc) of 18 August 1846 authorised a line supported by the Manchester and Leeds Railway; the act required amalgamation with the Manchester and Leeds Railway within three months. This was done on 17 November 1846; the actual construction of the line was carried out by the M&LR, which changed its title the following year to the Lancashire and Yorkshire Railway. The section from Low Moor to Mirfield was opened on 18 July 1848, but the more difficult construction from Bradford to Low Moor was delayed until 9 May 1850, and Mirfield to Halifax on 7 August 1850; the Sowerby Bridge section opened on 1 January 1852.

=== Preston and Wyre Railway 1846 ===
The Preston and Wyre Railway and Harbour Company was founded in 1835 to build from Preston via Poulton to the new town of Fleetwood; it opened in 1840. The company amalgamated with the Preston and Wyre Dock Company to form the Preston and Wyre Railway, Harbour and Dock Company in 1839. A branch from Poulton to Blackpool North and another to Lytham, both opening in 1846.

With the absorption of the Manchester and Bolton Railway and a share of the North Union Railway in 1846, the Manchester and Leeds Railway had now extended its influence to Preston. It had already had a close association with the Preston and Wyre Railway in running excursion traffic, and a closer connection was appropriate. The amalgamation of the two companies was authorised by the Manchester and Leeds Railway Act 1846 (9 & 10 Vict. c. cclxxvii) of 3 August 1846.

== Ashton, Stalybridge and Liverpool Junction Railway 1847 ==
A branch was proposed to run from Miles Platting to Ashton and Stalybridge, with a short branch to Ardwick, in Manchester. The bill was successful and the branch was authorised by the Ashton, Stalybridge and Liverpool Junction Railway Act 1844 (7 & 8 Vict. c. lxxxii) of 19 July 1844; there was no intention to build to Liverpool. The line was to terminate adjacent to the Stalybridge station of the Sheffield, Ashton and Manchester Railway, the predecessor of the Manchester, Sheffield and Lincolnshire Railway, which was authorised on the same day. The respective branches were required to be connected at Stalybridge. The Ashton, Stalybridge and Liverpool Junction Railway Act 1845 (8 & 9 Vict. c. cix), on 21 July 1845, authorised the branch from Miles Platting to connect with the Manchester and Birmingham Railway at Ardwick. The line to Ashton was opened on 13 April 1846, and on to Stalybridge on 5 October 1846. The branch was 6 miles 793 yards (10.381 km) long. It was a single line; double track was completed except across Medlock viaduct, by 1 March 1849, but approval for opening this second line was not received until 1 August. The Medlock viaduct was made suitable for double track which was opened towards the end of 1849. The Ardwick branch from Miles Platting was just under 2 miles (3 km) long, and opened on 20 November 1848 for goods trains only; regular passenger trains starting operating at the end of 1852.

== Wakefield, Pontefract and Goole Railway ==
Seeing potential in expanding eastwards, especially in connecting directly to an east coast port, (Note: Goole docks had access to the North Sea through the Yorkshire River Ouse and the Humber.) the M&LR sponsored the promotion of a line from its Wakefield station. An act of Parliament, the Wakefield, Pontefract and Goole Railway Act 1845 (8 & 9 Vict. c. cxlii), of 31 July 1845 authorised the Wakefield, Pontefract and Goole Railway. The planned line ran from the east end of the L&MR Wakefield Kirkgate station and headed broadly east through Crofton, Featherstone, Pontefract, Knottingley and Hensall to Goole. The line was opened on 1 April 1848 by which time the company had amalgamated with the M&LR and others to form the Lancashire and Yorkshire Railway on 9 July 1847. An act of Parliament, the Wakefield, Pontefract and Goole Railway and Port of Goole Act 1846 (9 & 10 Vict. c. ccxii) of 16 July 1846 authorised dock improvements at Goole, and another, the Wakefield, Pontefract and Goole Railway (New Branches) Act 1846 (9 & 10 Vict. c. clxxxv) also of 16 July 1846 authorised branches from Pontefract to Methley, opened on 12 September 1849, and from Knottingley to Askern, joining the Great Northern Railway.

== Formation of the Lancashire and Yorkshire Railway ==
As the scope of the network of the Manchester and Leeds Railway was extending considerably, it was decided on 9 December 1846 to change the name of the company; the title "the Lancashire and Yorkshire Railway" was settled upon, and this was confirmed by an act of Parliament, the Manchester and Leeds Railway Act (No. 3) 1847 (10 & 11 Vict. c. clxvi), of 9 July 1847. The act also incorporated the Wakefield, Pontefract and Goole Railway and the Ashton, Stalybridge and Liverpool Junction Railway into the L&YR.

The Manchester and Leeds Railway Act (No. 3) 1847 also authorised a south connection at Castleton from the M&LR main line onto the Heywood branch, allowing direct running from Manchester to Bury. In addition it authorised the Liverpool and Bury Railway to extend eastwards under the East Lancashire Railway at Bury to join the Heywood branch extension and to make an east to north connection between the two railways at Bury.

== Boiler explosion ==
On 28 January 1845, the boiler of locomotive No. 27 Irk exploded at Miles Platting, Lancashire.

== Location list ==
- Manchester Victoria; opened 1 January 1844; still open;
  - Manchester Oldham Road; opened 4 July 1839; closed 1 January 1844;
- Miles Platting; opened 1 January 1844; last train Friday 26 May 1995;
- Moston; open by February 1872; still open;
- Oldham Junction; opened 31 March 1842; renamed Middleton 11 August 1842; renamed Middleton Junction 1852; closed 3 January 1966;
- Mills Hill; opened 4 July 1839; closed 11 August 1842; new station opened 25 March 1985; still open;
- Blue Pits or Blue Pitts; opened 15 September 1839; renamed Castleton 1 November 1875; still open;
- Rochdale; opened 4 July 1839; relocated 28 April 1889; still open;
- Smithy Bridge; opened 1 October 1868; closed 2 May 1960; reopened 19 August 1985; still open;
- Littleborough; opened 4 July 1839; still open;
- Summit Tunnel;
- Walsden; opened October 1845; closed 7 August 1961; new station nearby opened 10 September 1990; still open;
- Todmorden; opened 28 December 1840; still open;
- Eastwood; opened 28 December 1840; closed 3 December 1951;
- Hebden Bridge; opened 5 October 1840; still open;
- Mytholmroyd; opened May 1847; still open;
- Luddenden Foot; opened 5 October 1840; closed 10 September 1962;
- Sowerby Bridge; opened 5 October 1840; relocated 1 September 1876; still open;
- Greetland Junction;
- North Dean; opened February 1846; renamed Greetland & North Dean 1 January 1883; closed 10 September 1962;
- Elland; opened 12 April 1841; relocated 1 August 1865; closed 10 September 1962;
- Brighouse; opened 5 October 1840; closed 5 January 1970; new station on same site opened 28 May 2000; still open;
- Cooper Bridge; opened 1 October 1840; closed 20 February 1950;
- Mirfield; opened 31 March 1845; relocated 5 March 1866; still open;
- Dewsbury; opened 5 October 1840; later renamed Thornhill; closed 1 January 1962;
- Horbury; opened 5 October 1840; renamed Horbury & Ossett 25 March 1903; renamed Horbury 18 June 1962; closed 5 January 1970;
- Horbury Junction; opened 1 January 1850; replaced by Horbury Millfield Road, opened 11 July 1927; closed 6 November 1961;
- Wakefield; opened 5 October 1840; renamed Wakefield Kirkgate from 1872; still open;
- Goose Hill Junction;
- Normanton; date of opening uncertain; North Midland Railway station; the line was opened 1 July 1840; still open.

=== Heywood Branch ===
- Blue Pitts; above;
- Heywood; opened 15 April 1841; relocated 1 May 1848 on extension to Bury; closed 5 October 1970.

=== Oldham branch ===
- Oldham Junction; above;
- Oldham; opened 31 March 1842; renamed Oldham Werneth 1849; closed 4 October 2009.

=== Halifax branch ===
- Greetland Junction; above;
- Halifax; opened at Shaw Syke 1 July 1844; moved to current location 7 August 1850.
