= Harpurhey =

Suburb of Manchester, England

Coordinates: 53.51°N 2.21°W

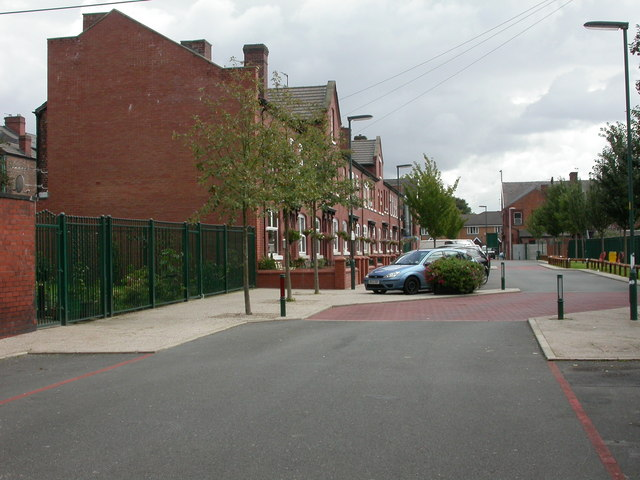
- Orchid Street, Harpurhey

- Location within Greater Manchester
- Population: 17,652 (2011 census)
- Metropolitan borough: City of Manchester
- Metropolitan county: Greater Manchester
- Region: North West
- Country: England
- Sovereign state: United Kingdom
- Post town: Manchester
- Postcode district: M9
- Dialling code: 0161
- Police: Greater Manchester
- Fire: Greater Manchester
- Ambulance: North West
- UK Parliament: Blackley and Middleton South
- Councillors: David Godfrey (Labour); Joanne Green (Labour)

Harpurhey (/ˈhɑːrpərˌheɪ/ HAR-pər-HAY) is an inner-city suburb of Manchester, England, 2.3 miles (3.7 km) northeast of the city centre. Historically in Lancashire, the population at the 2011 census was 17,652.

Areas of Harpurhey include Kingsbridge Estate, Barnes Green, Shiredale Estate and Baywood Estate.

== History ==
Harpurhey is recorded in 1320 as "Harpourhey", meaning "hedged enclosure by a man called Harpour", who owned the area in the 14th century.

Harpurhey lies on both sides of Rochdale Road from Collyhurst to Blackley, extending westward to the Irk. In 1830, it was described as abounding in pleasant views, but by 2007 was characterised as the worst place in England.

== Governance ==
Harpurhey was formerly a township and chapelry in the parish of Manchester, in 1866 Harpurhey became a separate civil parish. Harpurhey was included in the parliamentary borough of Manchester from its creation but was not taken into the municipal borough until 1885. On 26 March 1896 the parish was abolished to form North Manchester. In 1891 the parish had a population of 8380. Harpurhey is one of the most economically deprived areas within the Greater Manchester area.

Harpurhey is within the Blackley and Middleton South constituency, which has been represented in the House of Commons by Labour MP Graham Stringer who was first elected to the old Manchester Blackley constituency in 1997 and represented Blackley and Broughton from its creation in 2010 to its abolition in 2024. Before his election to Parliament, he was a councillor for Harpurhey from 1982, and leader of Manchester City Council from 1984.

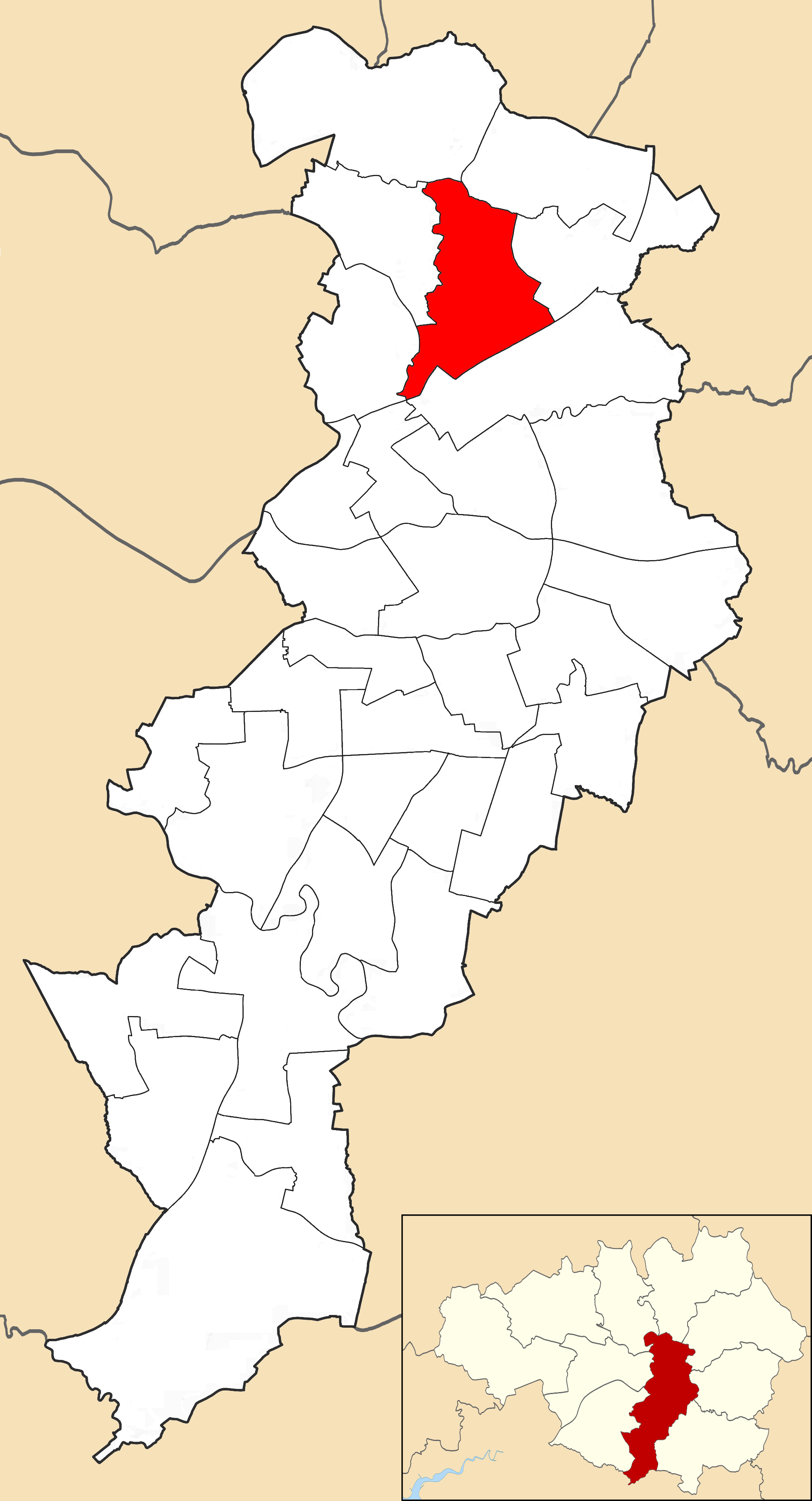
Harpurhey electoral ward within Manchester City Council.

The ward is represented on Manchester City Council by two Labour Party councillors, one seat is currently vacant due to the death of the incumbent Labour member: Joanne Green (Lab) and David Godfrey (Lab).

Election	Councillor	Councillor	Councillor
2004	Paul Fairweather (Lab)	Joanne Green (Lab)	Pat Karney (Lab)
2006	Paul Fairweather (Lab)	Joanne Green (Lab)	Pat Karney (Lab)
2007	Paul Fairweather (Lab)	Joanne Green (Lab)	Pat Karney (Lab)
2008	Paul Fairweather (Lab)	Joanne Green (Lab)	Pat Karney (Lab)
2010	Paul Fairweather (Lab)	Joanne Green (Lab)	Pat Karney (Lab)
2011	Paul Fairweather (Lab)	Joanne Green (Lab)	Pat Karney (Lab)
2012	Paul Fairweather (Lab)	Joanne Green (Lab)	Pat Karney (Lab)
2014	Sandra Collins (Lab)	Joanne Green (Lab)	Pat Karney (Lab)
2015	Sandra Collins (Lab)	Joanne Green (Lab)	Pat Karney (Lab)
2016	Sandra Collins (Lab)	Joanne Green (Lab)	Pat Karney (Lab)
2018	Pat Karney (Lab)	Joanne Green (Lab)	Sandra Collins (Lab)
2019	Pat Karney (Lab)	Joanne Green (Lab)	Sandra Collins (Lab)
2021	Pat Karney (Lab)	Joanne Green (Lab)	Sandra Collins (Lab)
2022	Pat Karney (Lab)	Joanne Green (Lab)	Sandra Collins (Lab)
2023	Pat Karney (Lab)	Joanne Green (Lab)	Sandra Collins (Lab)
2024	Pat Karney (Lab)	Joanne Green (Lab)	Sandra Collins (Lab)
2026	Pat Karney (Lab)	Joanne Green (Lab)	David Godfrey (Lab)

indicates seat up for re-election.

== Geography ==
Harpurhey is 2.3 miles (3.7 km) northeast of Manchester city centre, bordered to the north by Blackley, to the west by Crumpsall and Smedley, to the east by Moston and to the south by Collyhurst and Monsall.

== Landmarks ==
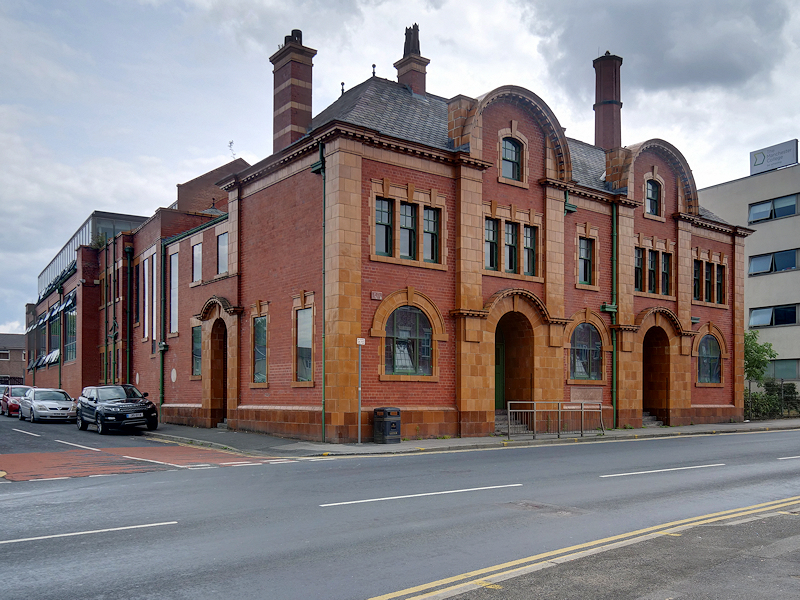
Harpurhey Baths

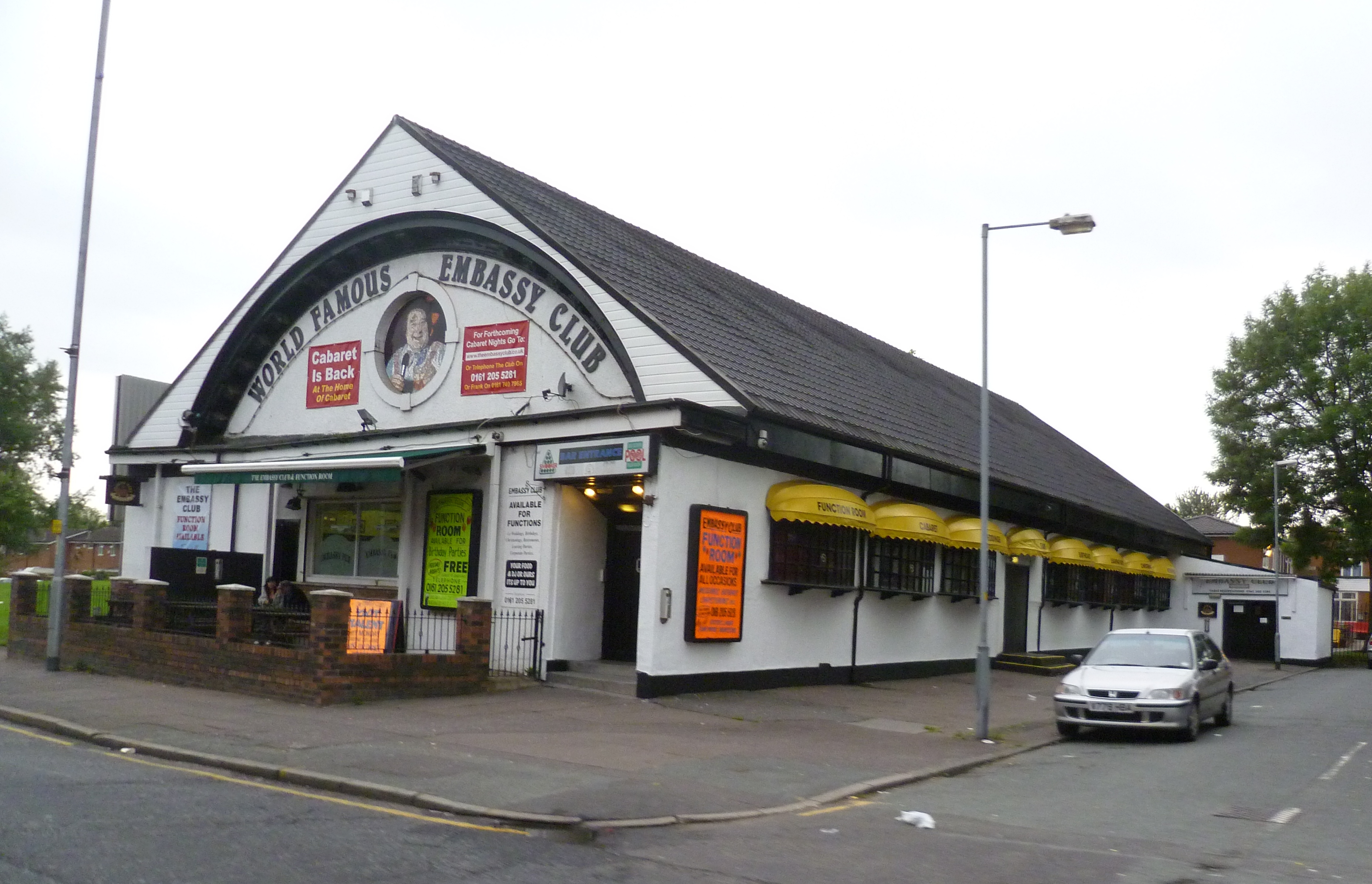
The Embassy Club

The Edwardian swimming baths on Rochdale Road were built between 1909 and 1910 by Henry Price, Manchester's first City Architect. Listed grade II in 1994, the baths closed to the public in 2001 after serious defects were discovered. The women's pool hall and laundry have now been replaced by the MANCAT sixth form college and community library.

The Embassy Club on Rochdale Road was bought by Bernard Manning in 1959, before which it had been Harpurhey Temperance Billiard Hall.

Queen's Park was one of Britains first municipal parks in 1846; designed and laid out by Joshua Major in 1845, the park was originally arranged around Hendham Hall, home of the Houghton family, which was demolished in 1884. The park incorporated a labyrinth, sheds and greenhouses, but by 1930 these had been removed. Today the park has a children's play area, rose gardens and hosts a variety of community events.

== Transport ==
Harpurhey is served by a number of bus services on the main Rochdale Road (A664) corridor, as well as non-radial services to and from Salford Shopping Precinct and Oldham. Bus services are provided by First Greater Manchester and Stagecoach Manchester.

Manchester Metrolink light rail tram system has three stations close to Harpurhey, at Queens Road, Monsall and Central Park (North Manchester Business Park), which also borders Newton Heath.

== Religion ==
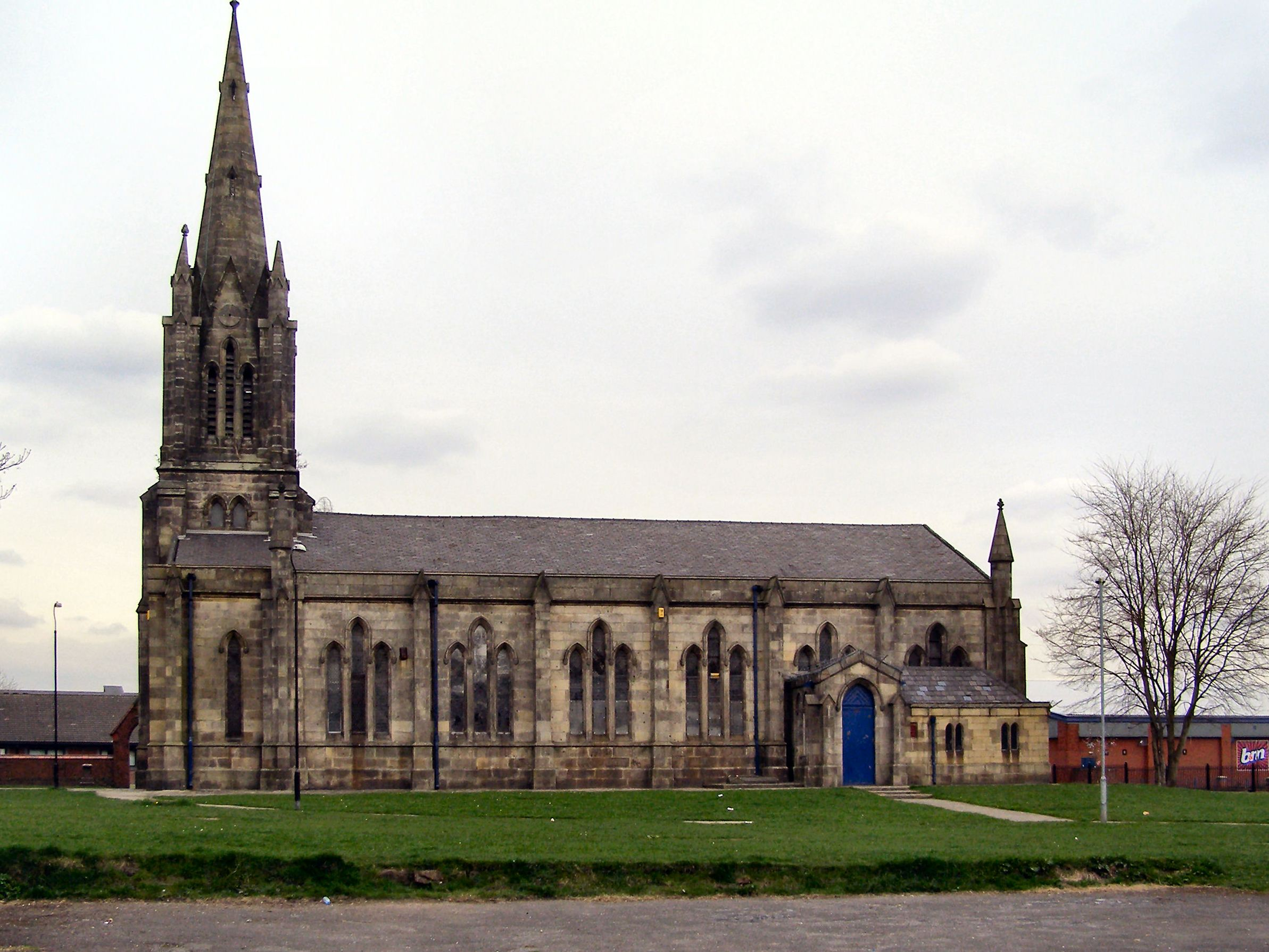
Christ Church, Harpurhey

Religion	Percentage of population
Christian	75.8%
No religion	12%
Not stated	9.7%
Muslim	1.7%
Buddhist	0.38%
Other	0.2%

There are a number of churches in the district, including the Church of England Christ Church, built in 1838. St Stephen's was founded in 1899 and closed in 1985, where is merged with Harpurhey United Church which became Harpurhey Community Church.

Other churches include Park View Christ the Vine and Deeper Life.

Harpurhey is in the Roman Catholic Diocese of Salford, and the Church of England Diocese of Manchester.

=== Manchester General Cemetery ===
Manchester General Cemetery Act 1848
- Act of Parliament
- Parliament of the United Kingdom
- Long title: An Act for the Consecration of a Portion of the Manchester General Cemetery.
- Citation: 11 & 12 Vict. c. iii

Dates
- Royal assent: 9 June 1848

Text of statute as originally enacted

Manchester General Cemetery in Harpurhey was founded in 1837 as a garden cemetery and is still open to existing grave-owners. Although now a municipal cemetery, it is believed that Harpurhey cemetery was originally a private undertaking taken over by the municipal authority in 1868. Harpurhey Cemetery became the final resting place of Hannah Beswick (in 1868), the Manchester Mummy. and Benjamin Brierley (1825–1896).

== Education ==
Two schools in the area cater for children aged between 3 and 11: Manchester Communication Primary Academy and Oasis Academy Harper Mount,

Manchester Communication Academy is at the junction of Queens Road and Rochdale Road in Harpurhey. It is run in conjunction with BT, Manchester City Council and The Manchester College catering for pupils aged 11–18.

== Sport ==
North City Family and Fitness Centre is a centre combining leisure facilities with a Sure Start Centre, just off Rochdale Road next to the North City Shopping Centre and Market. Harpurhey Swimming Club is based here. The centre includes a 25-metre, five lane swimming pool with a movable pool floor designed to help young, elderly and disabled people. There is a health suite which includes spa pool, sauna and steam rooms, and a gymnasium. The centre also offers an exercise studio with a programme of fitness classes and martial arts.

== Public services ==
Library services are provided by Manchester City Council. Policing in Harpurhey is provided by Greater Manchester Police, under the command of North Manchester Division. The opening times are 8 a.m.–8 p.m. Monday to Saturday, 10 a.m.–6 p.m. on weekends. There is a NHS crisis cafe in Harpurhey which opens in the evenings (and afternoons on weekends).

== Harpurhey market ==
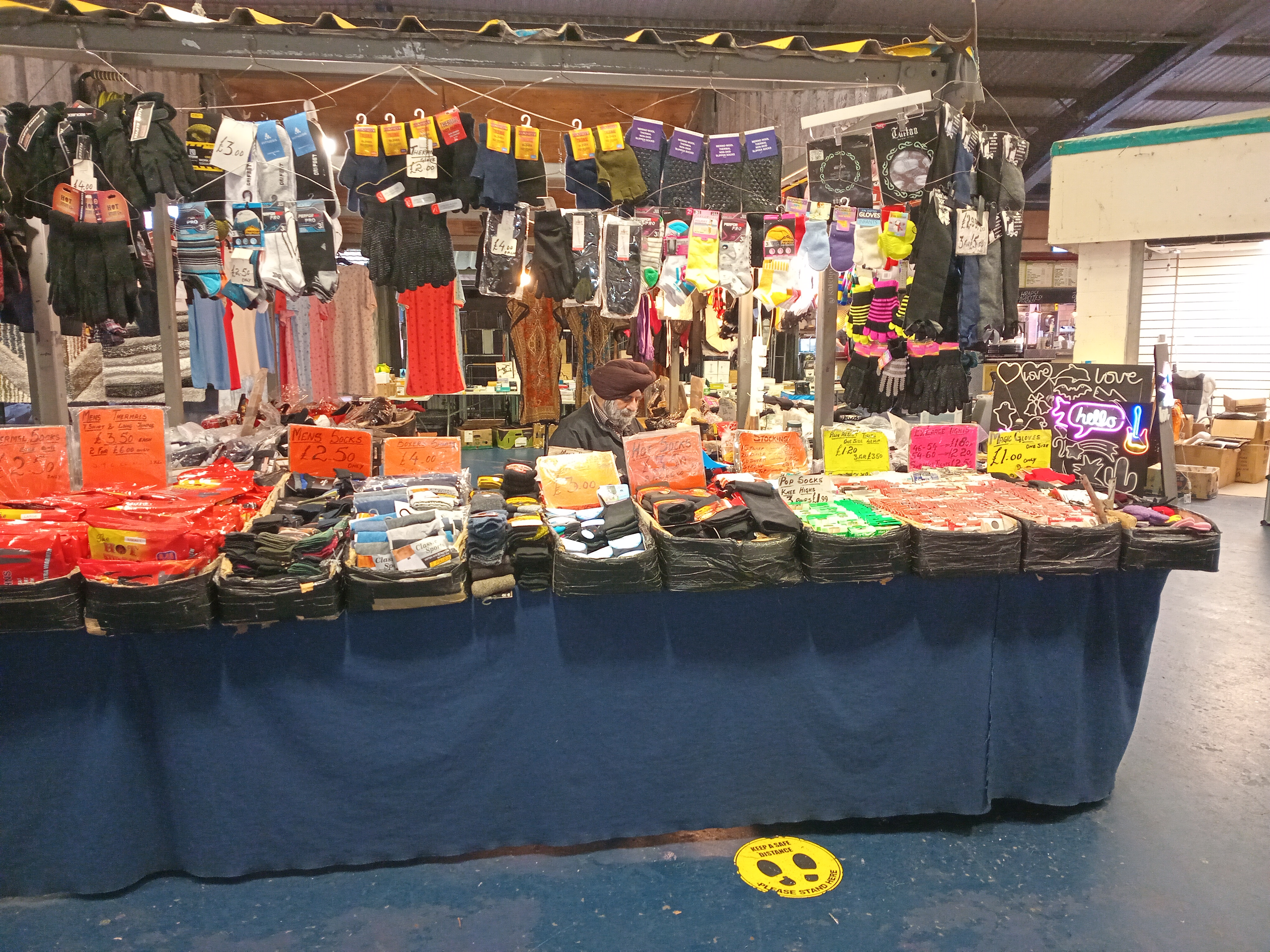
Harpurhey Market, 2025

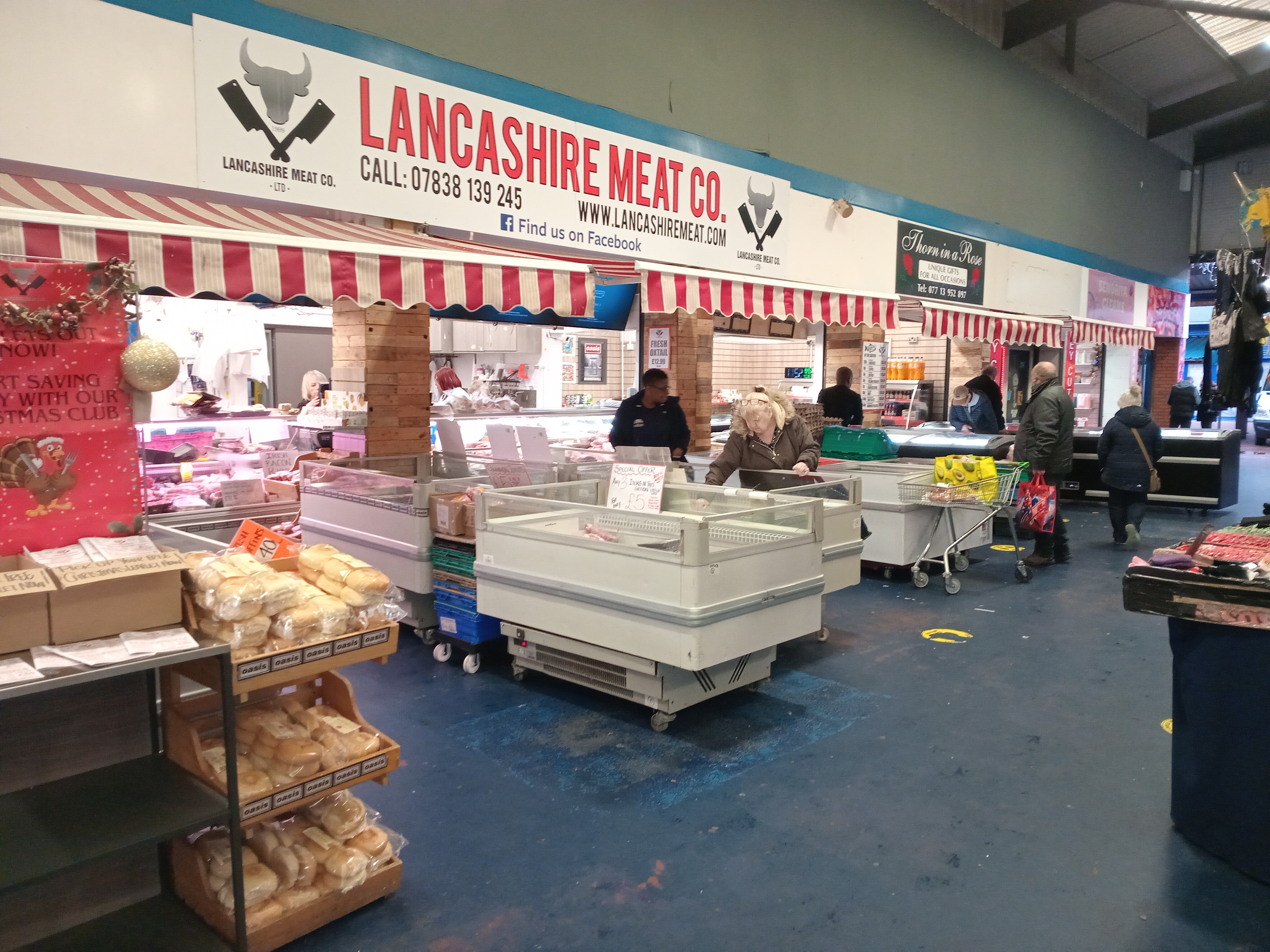
Harpurhey Market meat stall 2025

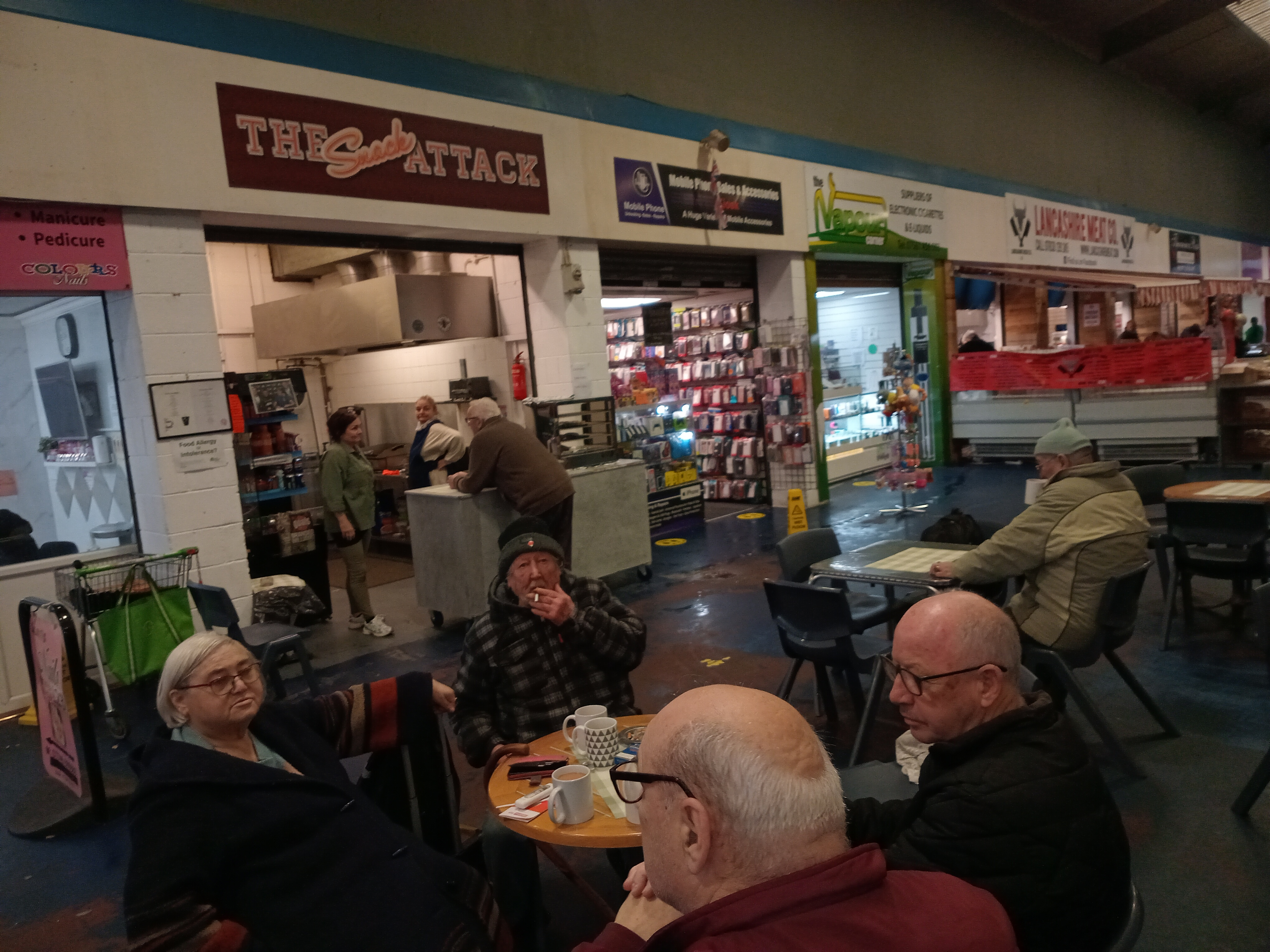
Snack Attack cafe

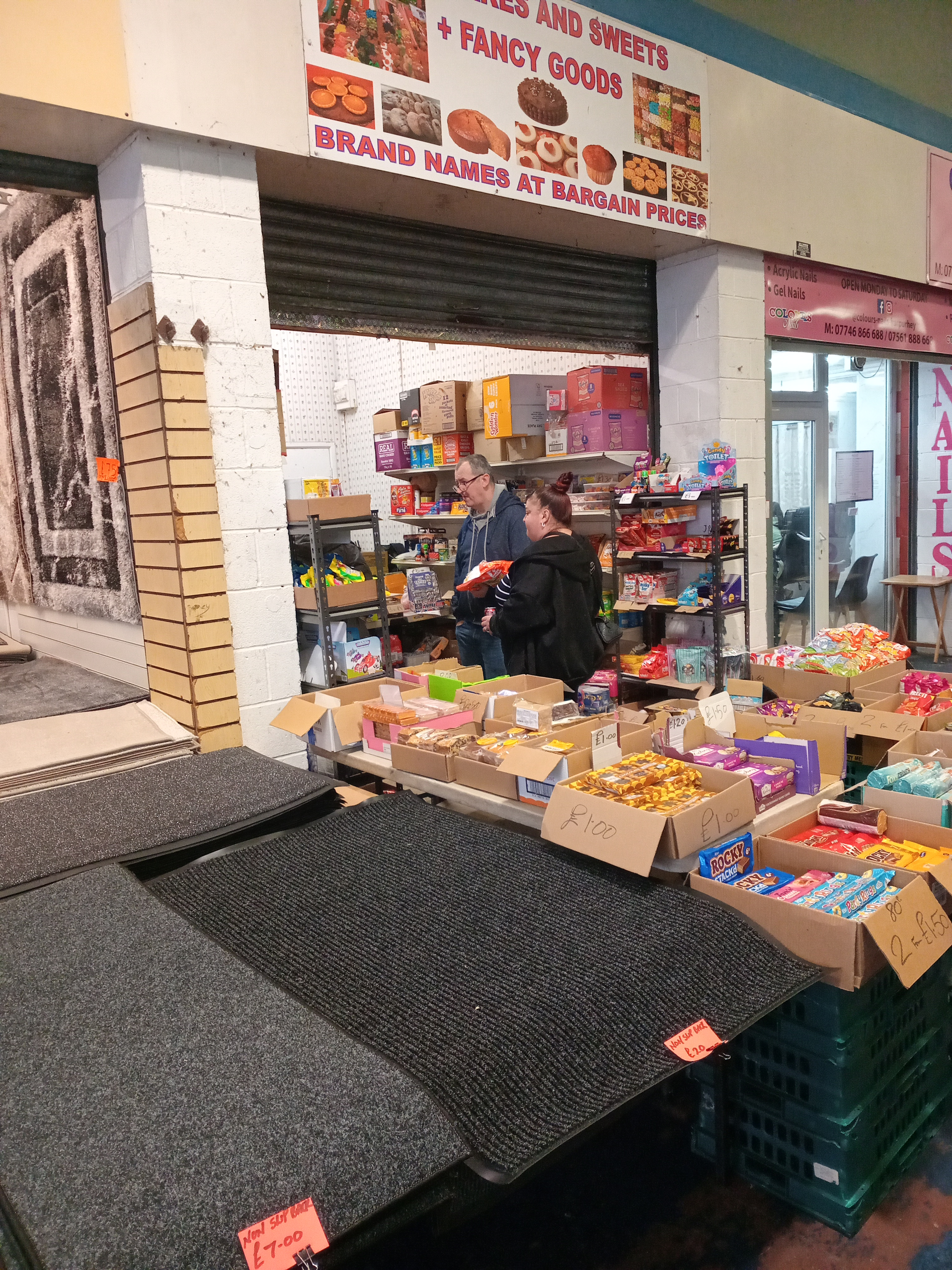
Harpurhey Market sweet stall 2025

== Notable people ==
- Anthony Burgess (1917-1993) was a novelist, critic, composer, librettist, poet, playwright, screenwriter, essayist, travel writer, broadcaster, translator, linguist and educationalist
- Rachel Fairburn (born 1983), stand-up comedian
- Freddie Garrity (1936–2006), singer in 1960s pop group Freddie and the Dreamers
- Shotty Horroh (born 1986), also known as Adam Rooney, is a retired battle rapper who is now a singer and songwriter
- Pat McDonagh (1934-2014), was a British fashion designer who became an important figure in Canadian fashion
- Smug Roberts (born 1960), real name Andy Robert Wilkinson, is an English stand-up comedian and actor
- Brandon Williams (born 2000), professional footballer for Manchester United

== See also ==
- Listed buildings in Manchester-M9
