= Manchester Communication Academy =

Location
- Silchester Drive; Manchester, Greater Manchester, M40 8NT; England, United Kingdom; 53.502291°N 2.217414°W

Information
- Type: Academy
- Motto: With you... for you... about you
- Established: September 2010
- Local authority: Manchester
- Department for Education URN: 136105 Tables
- Ofsted: Reports
- Principal: Susan Watmough
- Gender: Mixed
- Age: 11 to 16
- Enrolment: 1200 (ages 11-16)
- Website: www.manchestercommunicationacademy.com

Manchester Communication Academy is a secondary school in Harpurhey, Manchester which opened in September 2010 and specialises in communication-related subjects including speaking and listening, languages, drama, media and presentation skills, and information communication technology. It is part of the Greater Manchester Academies Trust.

== Building ==
The school was built in 2009-10 by Laing O'Rourke at a site on the corner of Rochdale Road and Queen's Road. Monsall Metrolink station is near the school. The school opened up for staffs and students on The 9 September 2010. The school has six different departments. Maths, English, Science, Creative Arts (Art, Music and Drama), Health and Wellbeing (P.E, Cooking and Hospitality/Catering) and Global Understanding (History, Geography, Citizenship, RE, ICT and MFL).
