= Manchester Victoria station =

Principal railway station in Manchester, England

Manchester Victoria
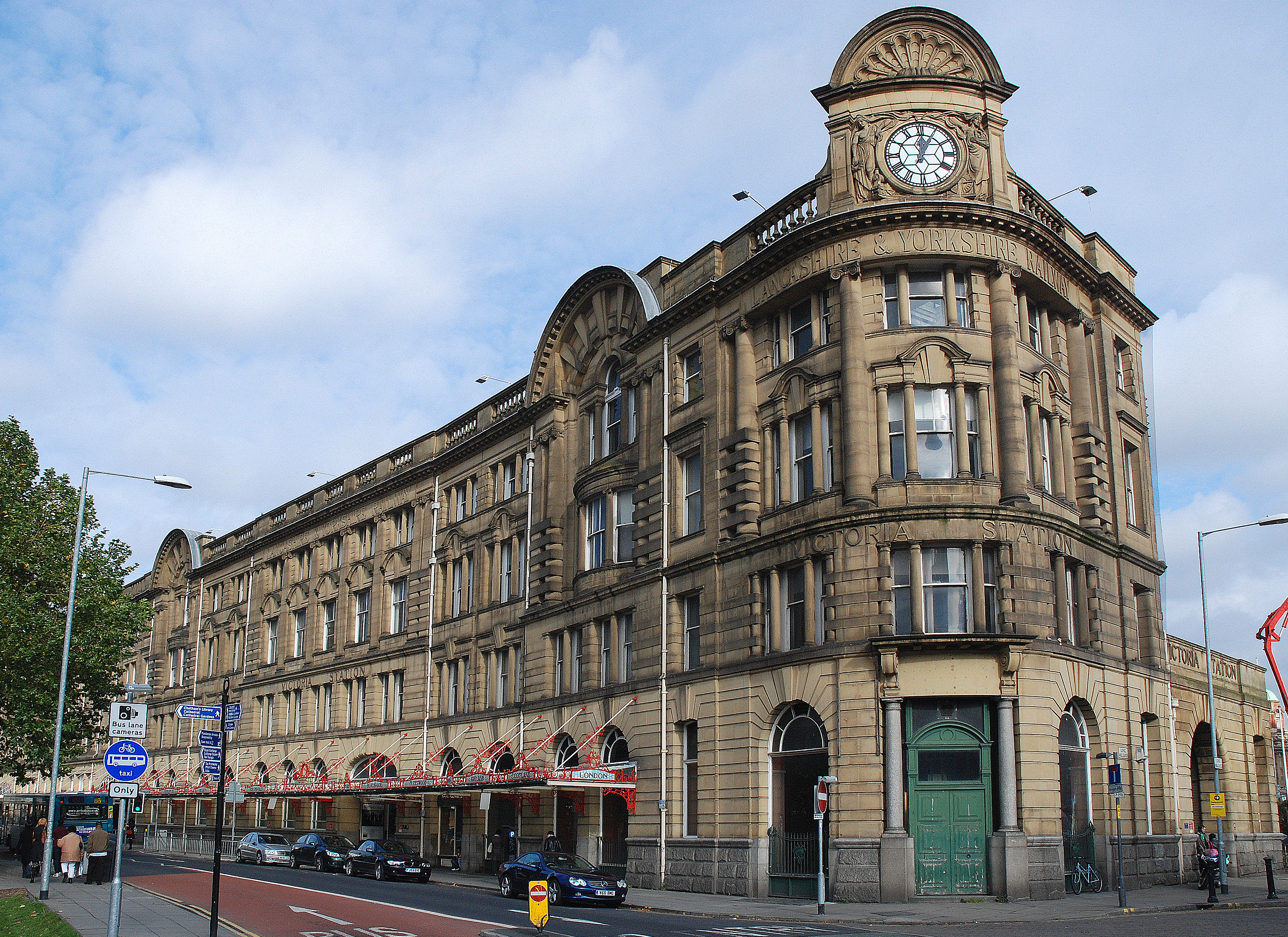
- Station frontage, constructed in 1909

General information
- Location: Manchester city centre, City of Manchester, England
- Coordinates: 53.4872°N 2.2424°W
- Grid reference: SJ839989
- Manager: Northern Trains
- Transit authority: Greater Manchester
- Platforms: 6 National Rail, 4 Metrolink

Other information
- Station code: MCV
- Fare zone: City (D)
- Classification: DfT category B

Key dates
- 1 January 1844: Opened
- 1902: Extended
- 1993–96: Northern portion reconstructed
- 2014–15: Renovated

Passengers
- 2021/22: ▲5.820 million
- Interchange: ▲0.811 million
- 2022/23: ▲7.003 million
- Interchange: ▲0.866 million
- 2023/24: ▲7.662 million
- Interchange: ▲0.875 million
- 2024/25: ▲8.379 million
- Interchange: ▲1.184 million
- 2025/26: ▲10.177 million
- Interchange: ▲1.270 million

Listed Building – Grade II
- Feature: Victoria Station including concourse to rear with restaurant and booking hall
- Designated: 20 June 1988
- Reference no.: 1254725
Location
Notes
- Passenger statistics from the Office of Rail and Road

Manchester Victoria in Manchester, England, is a combined main line railway station and Metrolink tram stop. Situated to the north of the city centre on Hunts Bank, close to Manchester Cathedral, it adjoins Manchester Arena which was constructed on part of the former station site in the 1990s. Opened in 1844 and part of the Manchester station group, Manchester Victoria is the city's second busiest railway station after Piccadilly, and is the busiest station managed by Northern Trains.

The station hosts local and regional services to destinations in Northern England, such as Blackburn, Rochdale, Bradford, Leeds, Newcastle, Huddersfield, Halifax, Warrington Bank Quay, Wigan, Southport, Blackpool (Sundays only) and Liverpool using the original Liverpool to Manchester line. Most trains calling at Victoria are operated by Northern Trains; TransPennine Express services call at the station from Liverpool to Newcastle/Hull and services towards Manchester Airport (via the Ordsall Chord) from Middlesbrough/Redcar/Saltburn.

Manchester Victoria is a major interchange for the Metrolink light rail system. Two former railway lines into the station have been converted to tram operations: the line to Bury was converted in the early 1990s, in the first phase of Metrolink construction, and the line through Oldham to Rochdale was converted during 2009–2014. In the other direction, trams switch to on-street running when they emerge from Victoria station and continue southwards through the city centre to Piccadilly or Deansgate-Castlefield.

In 2009, Victoria was voted the worst category B interchange station in the United Kingdom. The station underwent a two-year £44 million modernisation programme which was completed in August 2015. Renovation entailed electrification of lines through the station, renewed Metrolink stop with an additional platform, restoration of listed features, upgraded retail units, and a new roof. The Ordsall Chord directly linking Victoria to Oxford Road and Piccadilly was completed in December 2017.

== History ==
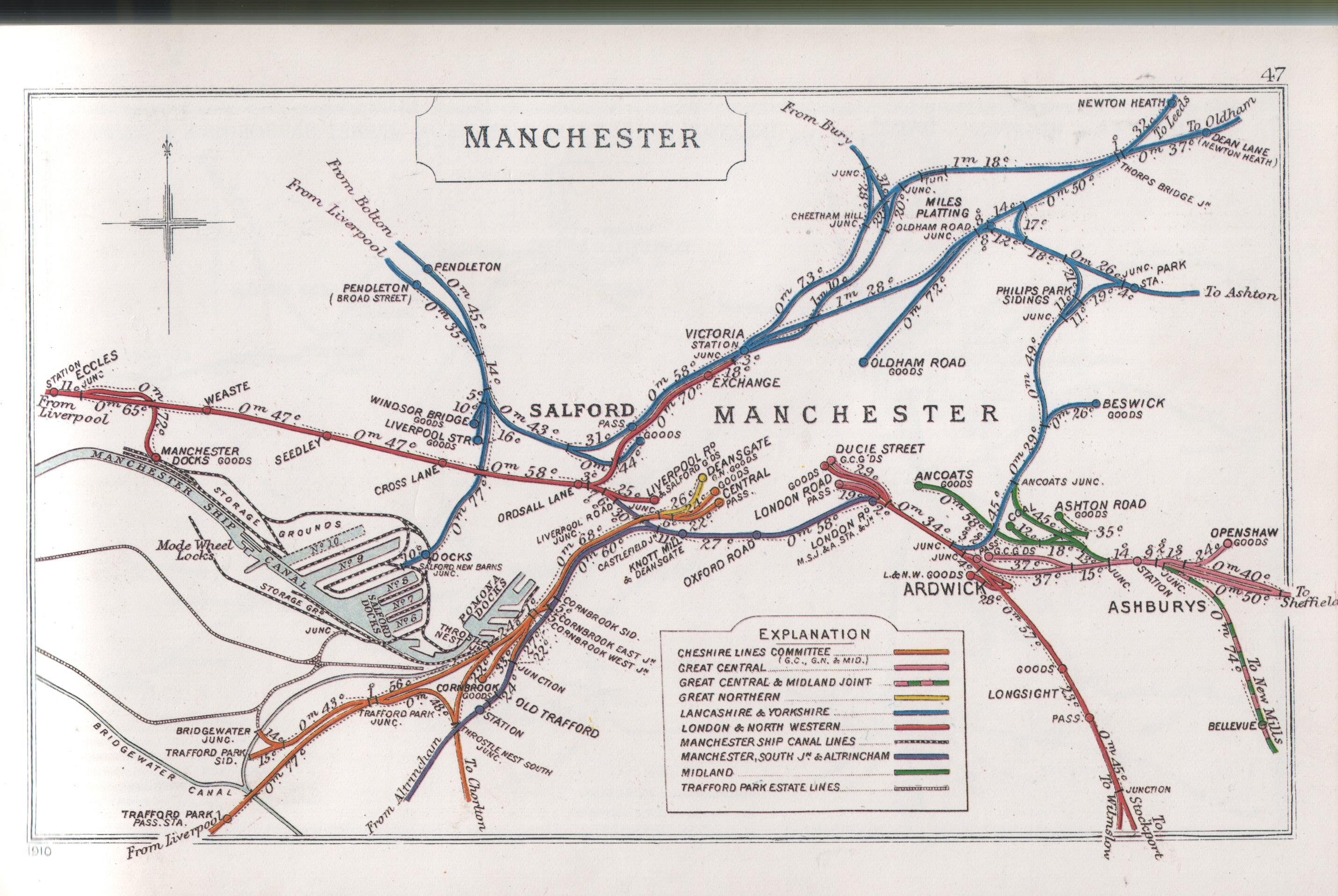
A Railway Clearing House map of central Manchester railways in 1910

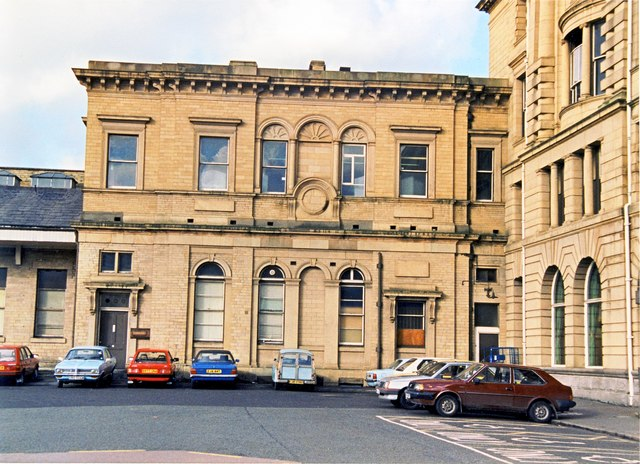
Part of the original 1844 station building, photographed in 1989. Originally it had a single storey and the second storey was added in the 1860s.

=== Origins ===
The Manchester and Leeds Railway (M&LR) was founded in 1836 and the company began building its line between Manchester and Leeds in 1837. Originally its line terminated at Manchester Oldham Road, which opened on 3 July 1839. The company realised it would be advantageous to join its line to the Liverpool and Manchester Railway (L&MR), creating a through route from Liverpool to Yorkshire with a joint station serving the centre of Manchester. In 1839, Samuel Brooks, vice-chairman of the M&LR, bought land at Hunt's Bank close to the cathedral and presented it to the company for the new station. The site was on the north bank of the River Irk, between the workhouse to the north which had opened in 1793 and Walker's Croft Cemetery to the south. After several years of negotiations between the companies, work started in 1842. The M&LR built an extension from Miles Platting to the station which opened on 1 January 1844. On this date, the Oldham Road terminus was closed to passenger services and became a goods station. The new station had a 852 ft (260 m) long single platform which handled M&LR trains to Leeds and elsewhere at its eastern end. The L&MR extended its line from Ordsall to Victoria and its trains operated from the western end from 4 May 1844, on which date its Liverpool Road station terminus became a goods station.

The station was named Victoria in 1843. Its long, single-storey building, designed by George Stephenson and completed by John Brogden, was approached by a wooden footbridge over the River Irk before the river was culverted. Most of the original 1844 station buildings are standing including part of the original façade on Hunt's Bank.

The L&MR became part of the Grand Junction Railway in 1845, which in turn amalgamated with other railways to create the London and North Western Railway (LNWR) in 1846; the M&LR amalgamated with other railways to create the Lancashire and Yorkshire Railway (L&YR) the following year. The headquarters of the L&YR were based alongside Victoria.

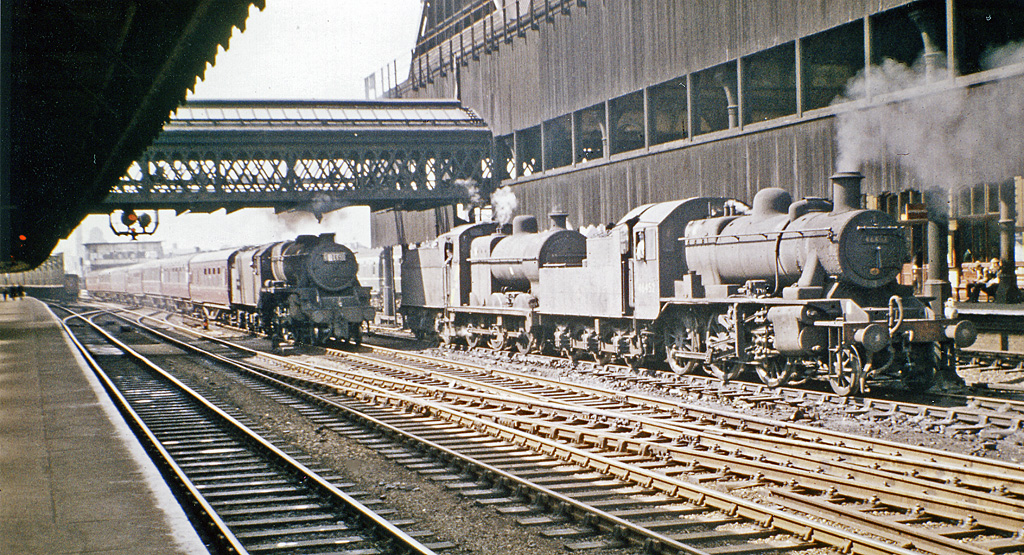
Platforms 11 (left) and 12 (right), looking west towards Manchester Exchange in 1964

=== Expansion ===
By the mid-1840s, six railway companies operated from the station connecting Manchester to London, Glasgow, Liverpool, Leeds and Sheffield. Victoria station dominated the Long Millgate area and was one of the biggest passenger stations in Great Britain.

Victoria underwent several phases of expansion as traffic grew. In 1865, four bay platforms were built on the eastern side on land reclaimed from the cemetery and another was built on the western side; a second through platform was built at the northern side and the station's facilities were expanded by the construction of a new east wing of the station building. Two decades later, the L&YR purchased and demolished the workhouse north of the station, and its site was used to build another bay and five through platforms which came into use in 1884. That same year, the LNWR opened its own station, Manchester Exchange immediately to the west on the opposite side of the River Irwell, and vacated Victoria.

The station's bay platforms 6–10 in 1968, only the two on the right are still extant.

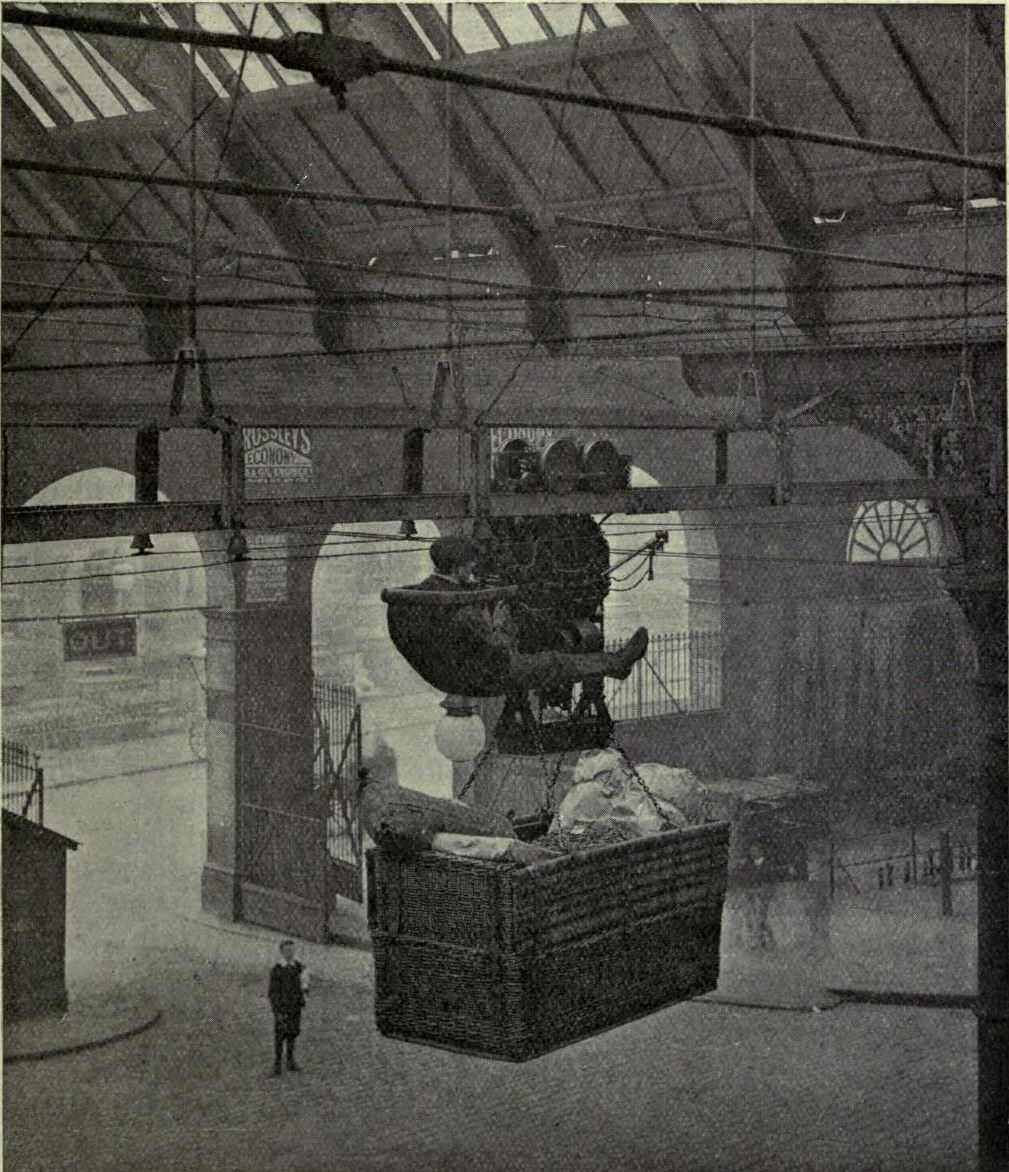
The former overhead parcels carrier system in 1914

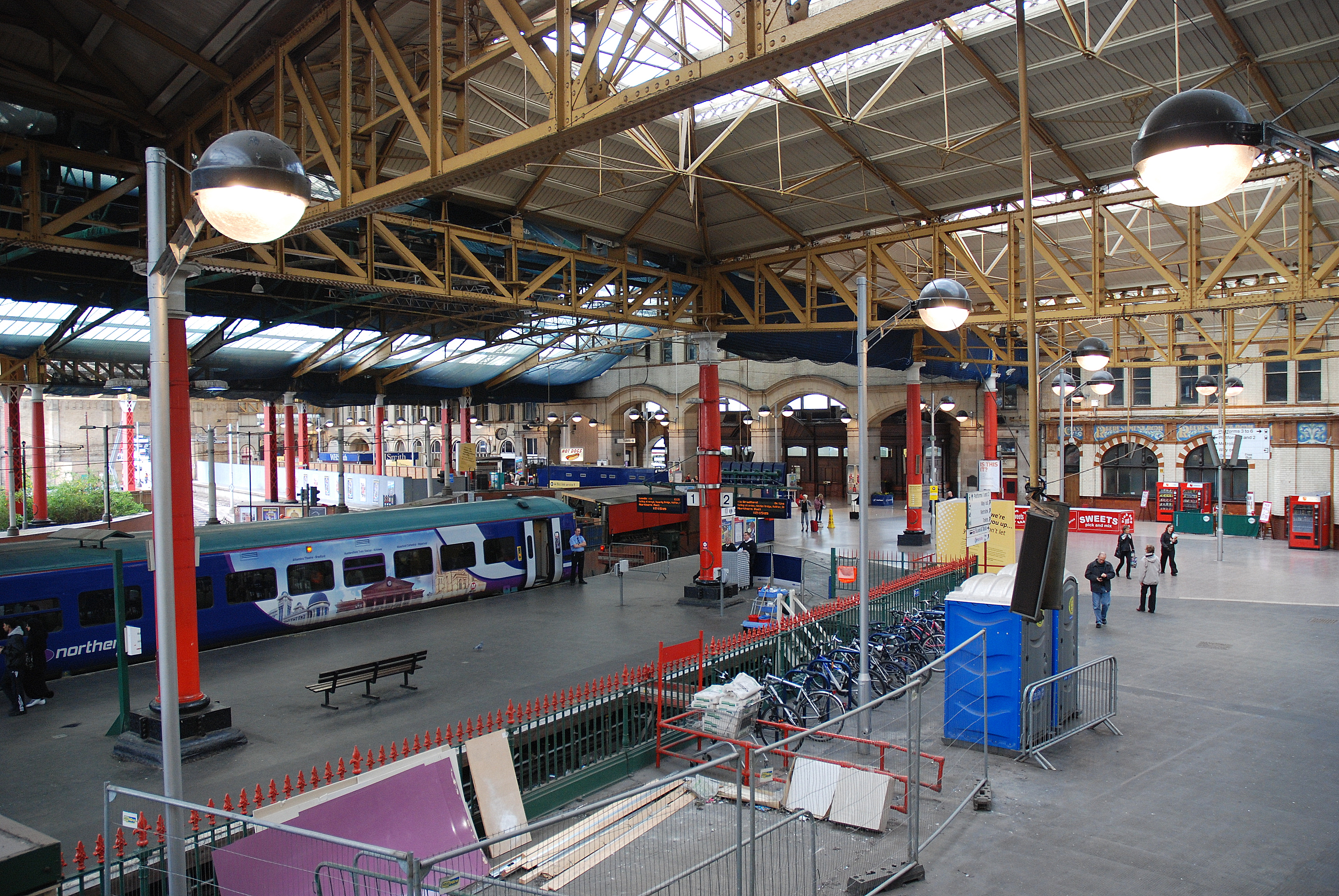
Overlooking the station concourse in 2009, before redevelopment in 2014.

Victoria reached its maximum extent of 17 platforms in 1904, when the station was enlarged with extra bay platforms to the south. The present station façade, designed by William Dawes, was built in 1909. The cast-iron train sheds behind the façade were 700 yards (640 m) long.

An overhead parcels carrier system was constructed in 1895 because the station handled large amounts of parcel and newspaper traffic. It consisted of an overhead track which ran in a circuit around the station, upon which electrically powered trolleys ran suspended from the track, operated by airborne attendants. A large basket could be raised and lowered from the trolleys to distribute parcels and newspapers across the station. The system operated until 1940.

The L&YR merged with the LNWR on 1 January 1922. A year later, the merged company became the largest constituent of the London, Midland and Scottish Railway (LMS). From 16 April 1929, Victoria and Exchange station were linked by the westward extension of platform 11 over the Irwell bridge, known as platform "11 Middle", which joined to Exchange's platform 3 to create Europe's longest platform at 2,238 feet (682 m). Crossovers enabled it to accommodate three trains arriving and departing independently. Exchange station closed in 1969 and its services were transferred to Victoria. The Exchange Station site opposite the cathedral was for many years used as a car park, until redevelopment of the site began in 2015.

The station suffered bomb damage during the Manchester Blitz in World War II. On 23 December 1940, several bombs hit the station destroying the parcels office, and a large part of the roof over platforms 12 to 16. The parcels office was rebuilt, but the damaged parts of the roof were taken down and not replaced. The station came into the ownership of British Railways in 1948.

=== Picc-Vic tunnel and Metrolink ===
Proposals to build an underground station, Victoria Low Level as part of the Picc-Vic tunnel project emerged in the early-1970s. The scheme proposed creating a direct rail link between Victoria and Manchester Piccadilly via a tunnel and creating several underground stations in Manchester city centre. Platforms 1–4 at Victoria were taken out of use in 1973 in anticipation of the tunnel coming to the surface in that part of the station.

The tunnel project was cancelled in the late 1970s because of high costs; in the 1980s, transport planners turned to light rail as a lower-cost option. As a result, the stations were linked by the Manchester Metrolink system which opened in 1992. A street-level tramway was built across the city centre linking the stations and two converted rail lines to Altrincham and Bury. The tram stop at Victoria replaced the former Bury Line platforms and the tram line was extended into the streets through a new entrance in the side of the station.

=== Downsizing ===
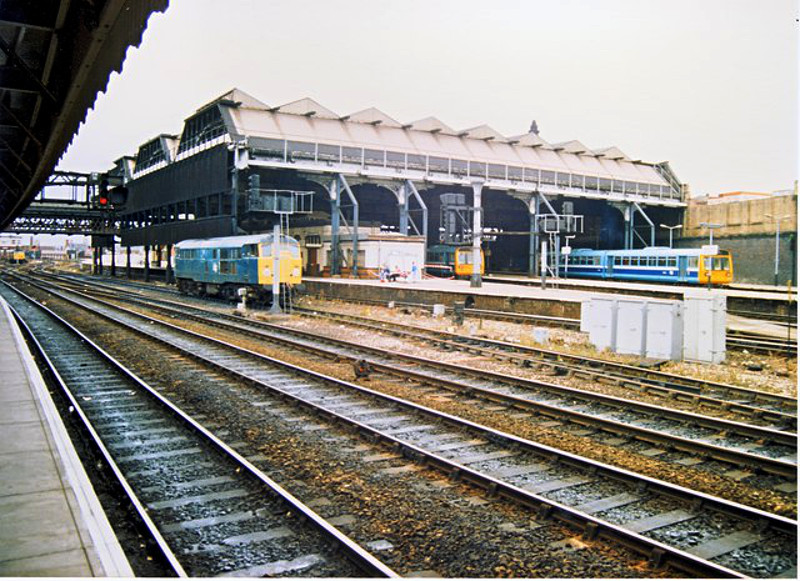
The station in 1988, showing the former tracks, platforms and train shed, which were removed to make way for the Manchester Arena

In the 1980s and 1990s, British Rail adopted a policy of concentrating Manchester services into Manchester Piccadilly. In 1989, the Windsor Link chord in Salford opened, enabling many of Victoria's services from the north to be diverted to Piccadilly and in the same year, trans-Pennine services were also transferred. Victoria was reduced to six platforms, and part was sold for development. Between 1992 and 1994, the Manchester Arena was built over the northern part of the station site. Three of the five through tracks between platforms 11 and 12 were removed, along with platforms 12–17. The station was reduced to four through tracks and four through platforms, three of which were built to replace the removed platforms 12–14. They are covered by the Arena which was joined to the station by means of a raft above them. The Arena is accessed via stairs on Hunts Bank and from the station concourse. Following reconstruction, the platforms were renumbered; platforms 1 and 2 are bay platforms facing east (formerly platforms 9 and 10), and the through platforms are 3 to 6 (platform 3 was formerly platform 11). The through platforms are used by mid-distance services.

=== Renovation ===
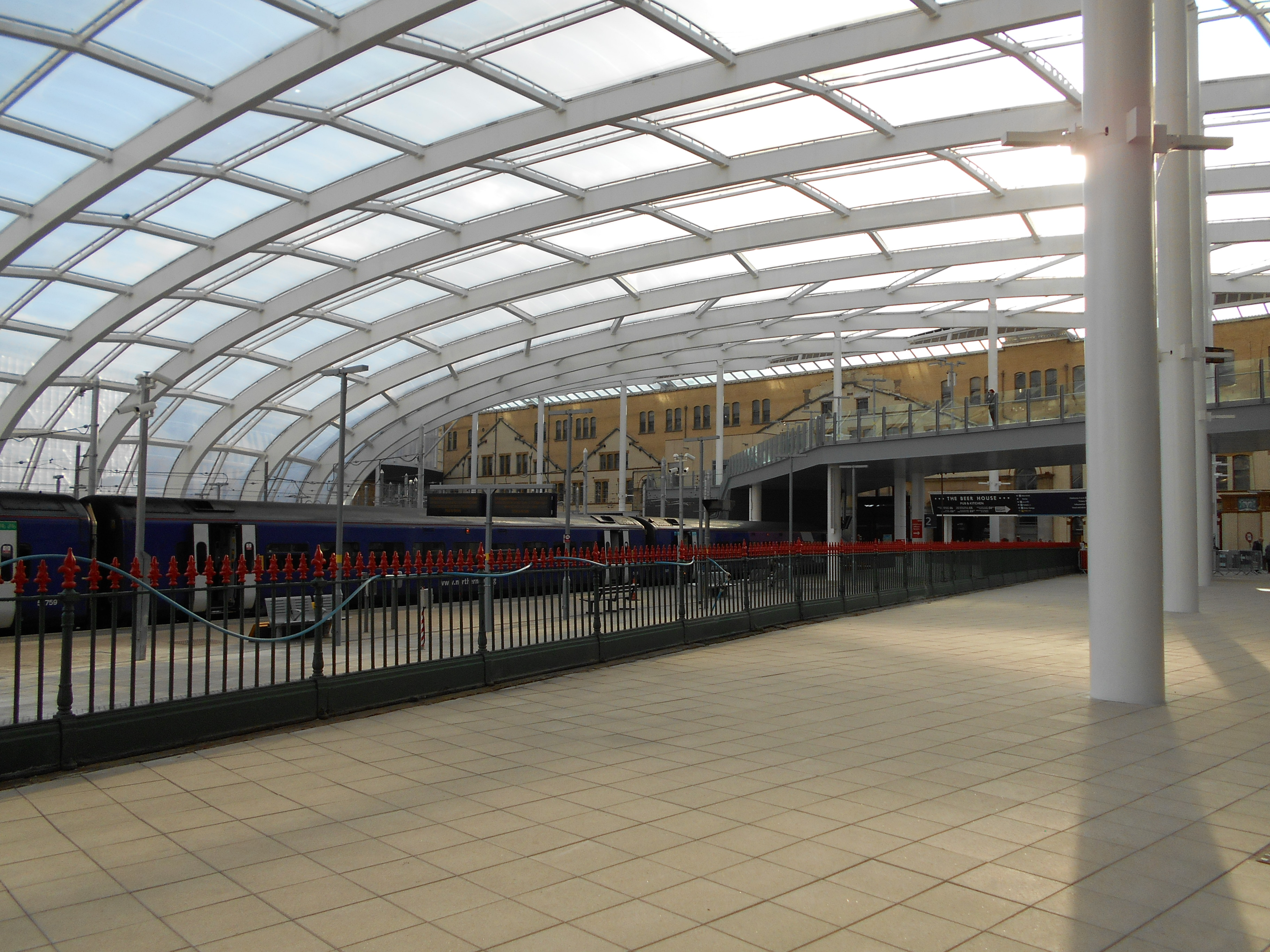
Completed new roof at Victoria, 2015

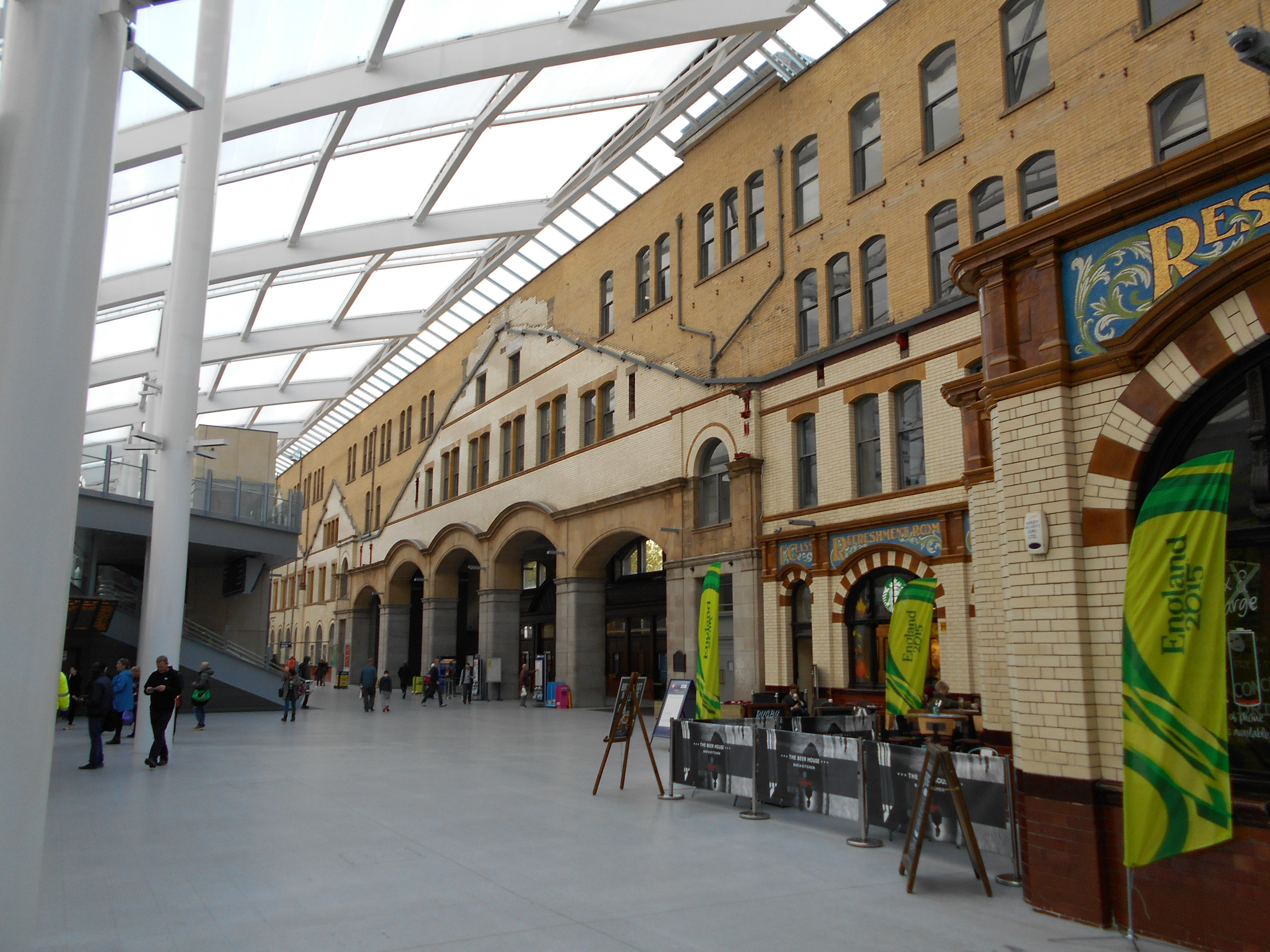
Station concourse following completion of the new roof

In 2009, Victoria was identified as the worst category B interchange station because of its dilapidated fabric and environment. The-then Transport Secretary, Lord Adonis, announced that, with nine others, it would receive a share of £50 million for a refurbishment programme. Victoria's £5 million share of the 'Better Stations' Network Rail funding for improvements was cancelled in the June 2010 budget cuts, but replacement funding was arranged. On 16 February 2010, Network Rail announced its intention to refurbish the station as part of the Northern Hub improvement proposals turning it into an interchange for local and regional services throughout north-west England. In August 2010, Network Rail announced the work would go ahead, despite the withdrawal of the £5 million funding. Station improvements included an ETFE roof; restoration of its walls, exterior canopy and period features; new platforms for additional services; improved access to the Manchester Arena; and improved retail and dining facilities.

Work to refurbish the station began in April 2013. The old roof was dismantled in autumn 2013. Installation of the £17 million roof began in May 2014 and final roof beam was lifted into position on 13 October 2014. Installation of the ETFE sheeting was completed in spring 2015, and the station upgrade was completed in August 2015, with the official reopening that October.

The Ordsall Chord was finished in 2017 and links Victoria to Piccadilly. It is anticipated that, after re-routeing services, passenger numbers would increase to 12 million by 2019, compared with 6.6 million in 2011/12. The chord allows trains to run directly between Piccadilly and Victoria, shortening journey times on TransPennine Express routes between Manchester Airport and Newcastle, Redcar, Hull and Scarborough. An express service from Liverpool Lime Street to Newcastle via Victoria is operated by TransPennine Express. Reinstatement of the south and west curve at Todmorden on the Caldervale Line facilitated a direct service between Victoria and Burnley Manchester Road for the first time in almost fifty years.

=== Electrification ===
In the 1900s, the Bury Line, a busy commuter line which served the suburbs of north Manchester from Victoria, was losing passengers to tramway competition, in response to this, in 1914 the L&YR decided to electrify this line using a unique 1,200 volt side-contact third rail system, in an effort to win back passengers.

Electrification of this route was completed in 1916. As the scheme was a success, in the early 1920s the L&YR drew up plans to extend electrification to the Oldham Loop Line using the same system. The scheme progressed to an advanced stage, however with the reorganisations of railway companies in the 1920s, the new management had no interest in pursuing the scheme and it was dropped. This meant that the Bury Line remained as the only electrified line into Victoria, and it remained as such until 1991 when it was closed to be converted into part of the Metrolink system.

No further electrification came to Victoria until the 21st century, when as part of Network Rail's Northern Hub scheme, overhead electric wires have been erected to Victoria from Manchester to Liverpool in 2015, and Manchester to Preston and through to Blackpool in 2019.

== Layout ==
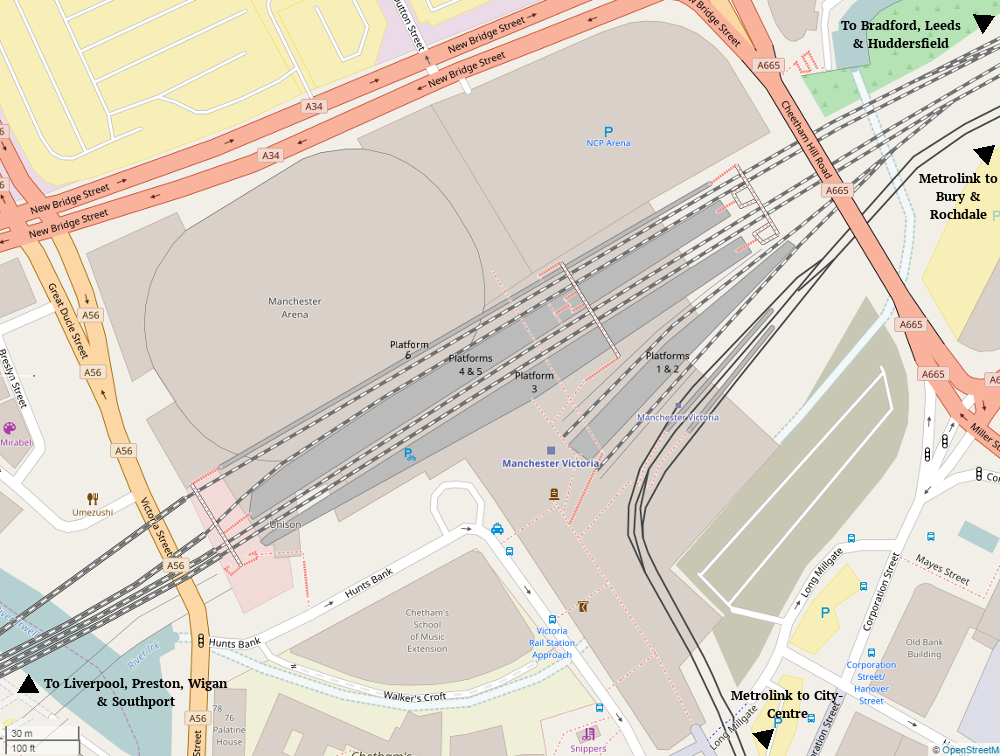
Layout map of Manchester Victoria

Manchester Victoria has six railway platforms and the Metrolink stop has four (four platform faces on three tracks). Two railway platforms are bays numbered 1 and 2, for terminating trains arriving from the east, and four are through platforms numbered 3–6 at the northern side of the station. The Metrolink platforms are parallel to, and south of, the bay platforms. Only the bay and Metrolink platforms are under the new roof; the through platforms 4, 5 and 6 are mostly covered by Manchester Arena.

== Architecture and heritage ==
The original M&LR single-storey offices facing Hunt's Bank Approach were built in the Italianate style in sandstone ashlar with slate roofs in 1844. They were later enlarged and given a second storey. William Dawes built the station's larger extension for the L&YR in 1909. It is at right-angles to the north end of the old station giving the enlarged station an L-shaped plan. Facing Victoria Station Approach, its façade is in the Edwardian neo-Baroque style, four storeys high and 31 bays to the rounded corner at the south-east end. The ground floor windows have rounded heads and those on the floors above are square. The ornate glass and iron canopy along the façade displays the names of destinations that the station served in Art Nouveau lettering. The canopy was damaged by the Provisional IRA's 1996 bomb placed in a street adjacent to the Arndale Centre and was restored four years later.

Heritage features in the concourse were restored during the 2013-15 renovation, they include the café with its glass dome and mosaic lettering which was originally the first-class dining room, the adjacent bookstall, and the original 1909 wood-panelled booking hall. In the entrance is a large, white glazed tiled map showing the former network of the Lancashire and Yorkshire Railway.

Underneath the map is a bronze World War I war memorial with effigies of Saint George and Saint Michael at each end which was installed in 1923 in memory of fallen men from the Lancashire and Yorkshire Railway. At the south end of the concourse is the 'soldier's gate' which opened to the former fish docks from where thousands of soldiers departed for World War I and where a bronze plaque was erected to commemorate them. The gateway was restored in 2015 and a steel screen inserted featuring a map of World War I Commonwealth War Grave cemeteries in Northern France and Belgium.

The station received Grade II listed building status in 1988.

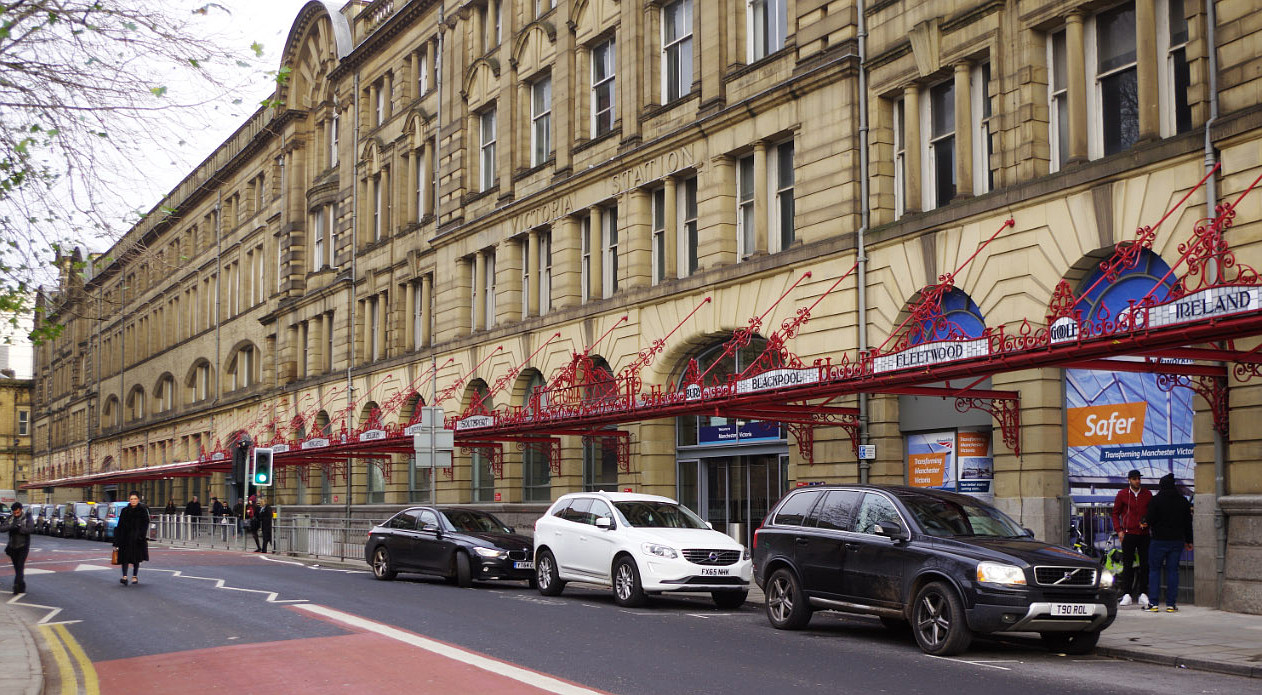
Station façade and canopy, with names of destinations

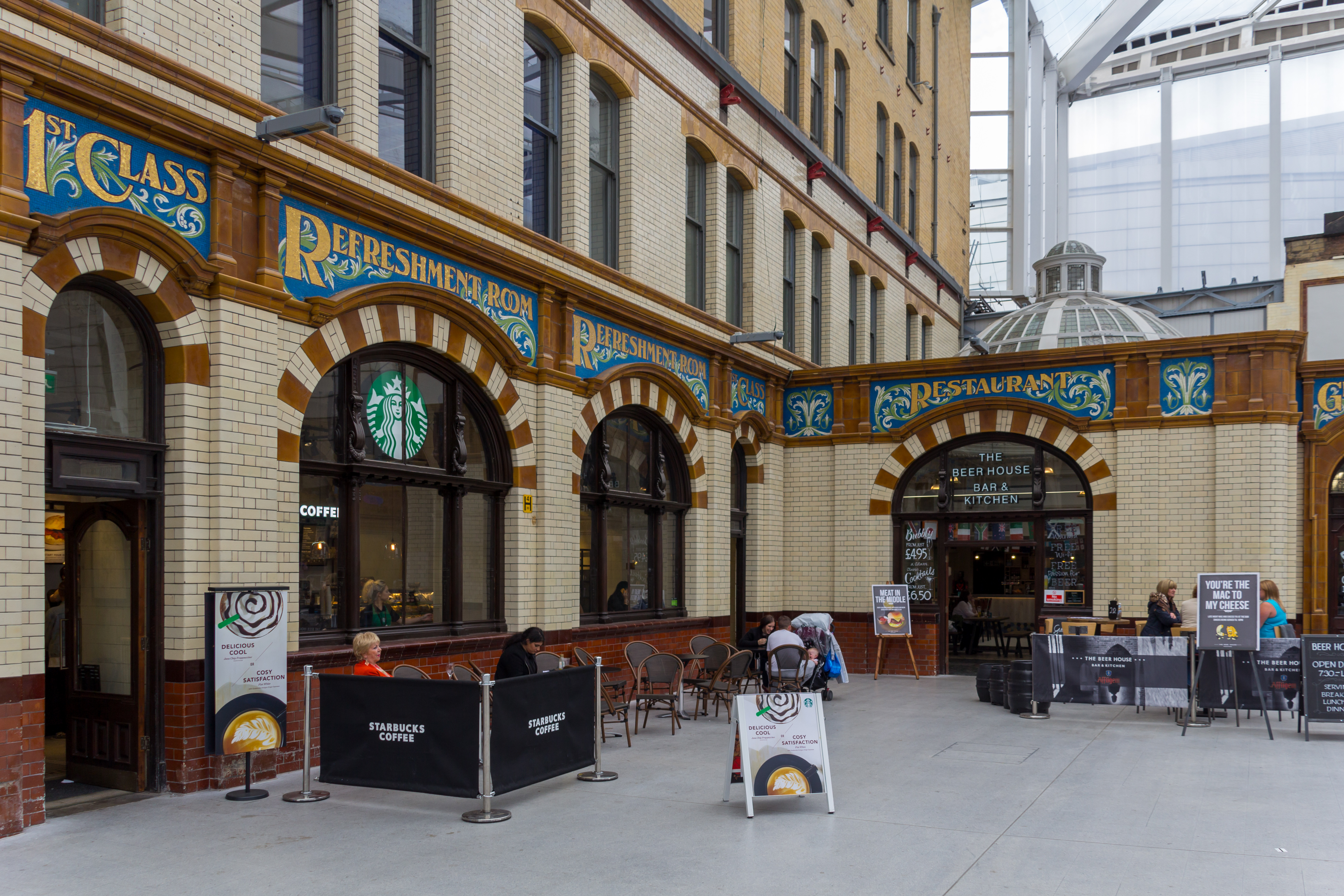
Restored former first class café and restaurant in the concourse

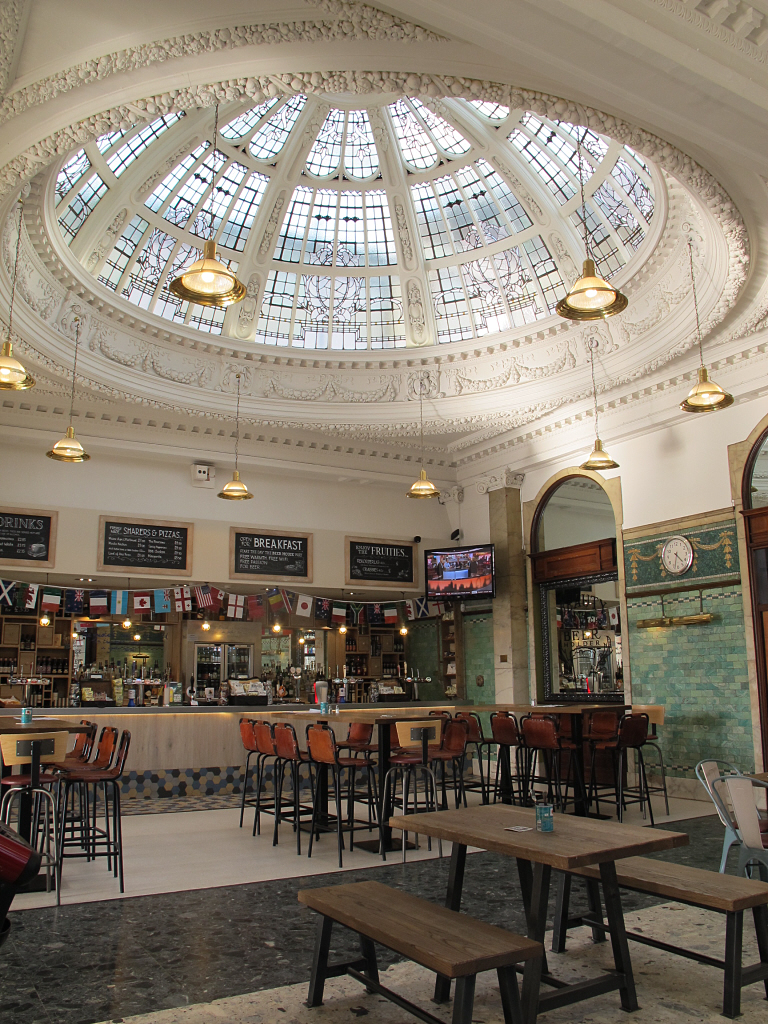
The restored interior of the café.

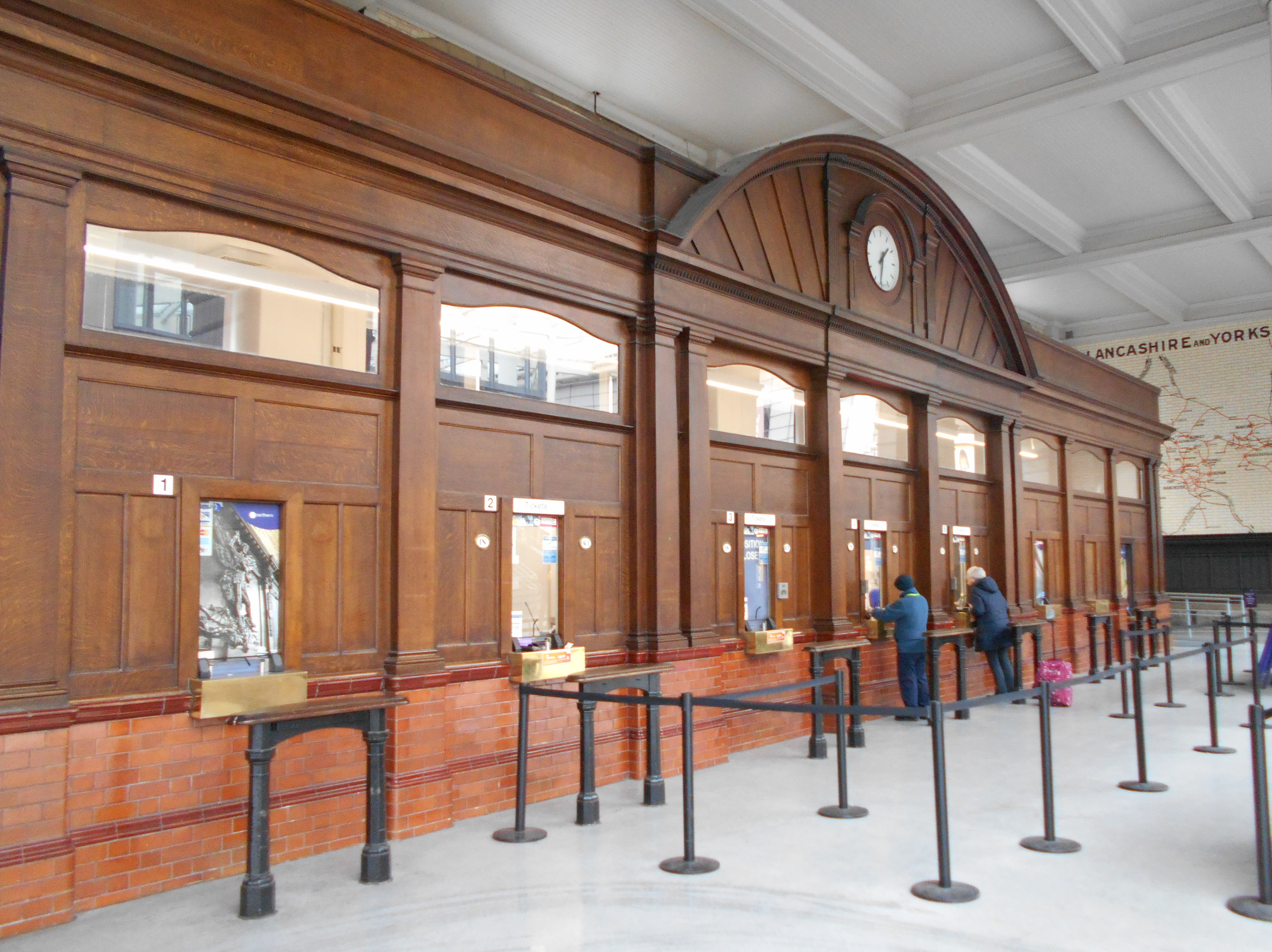
Booking office

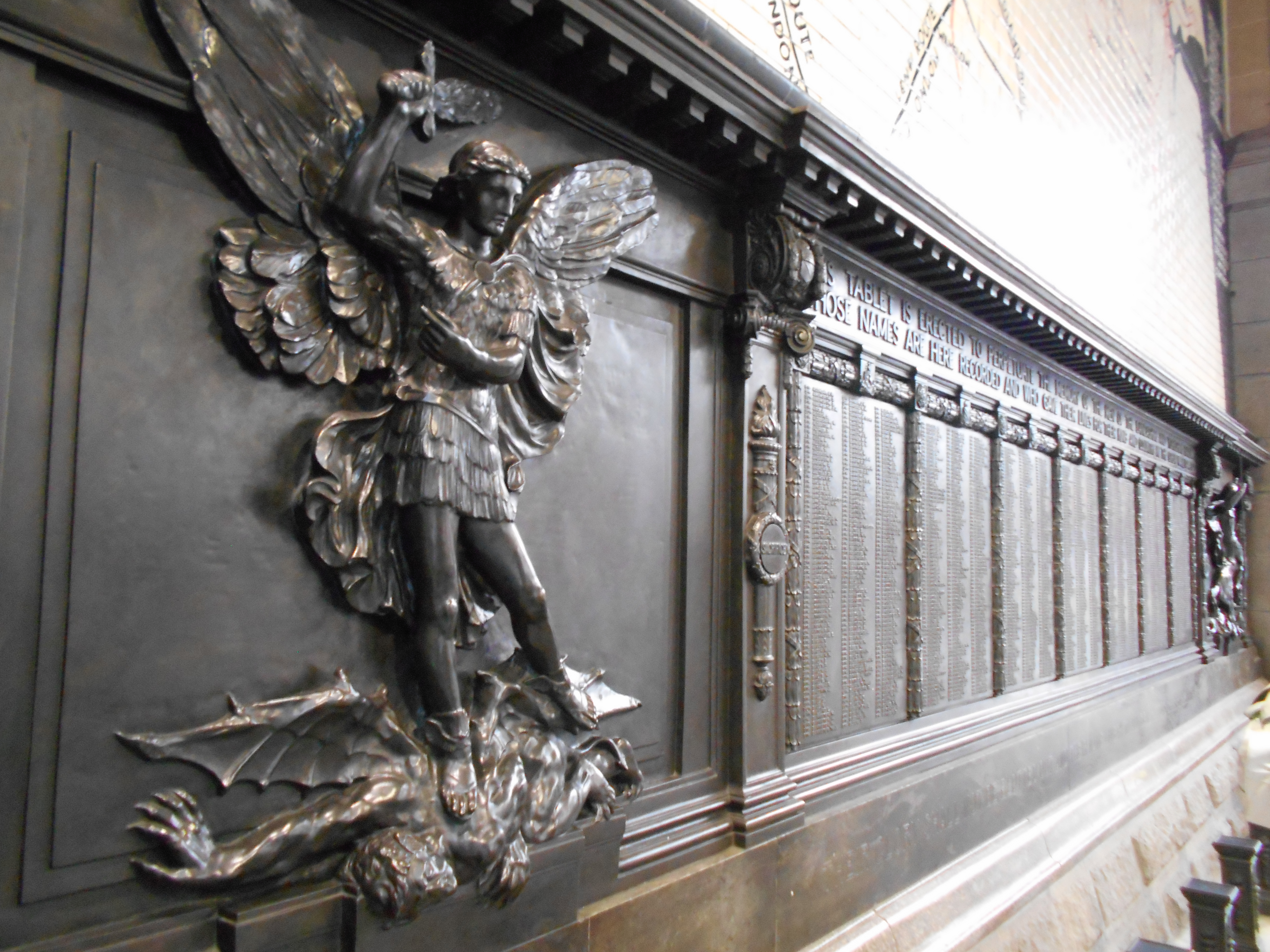
Bronze war memorial.

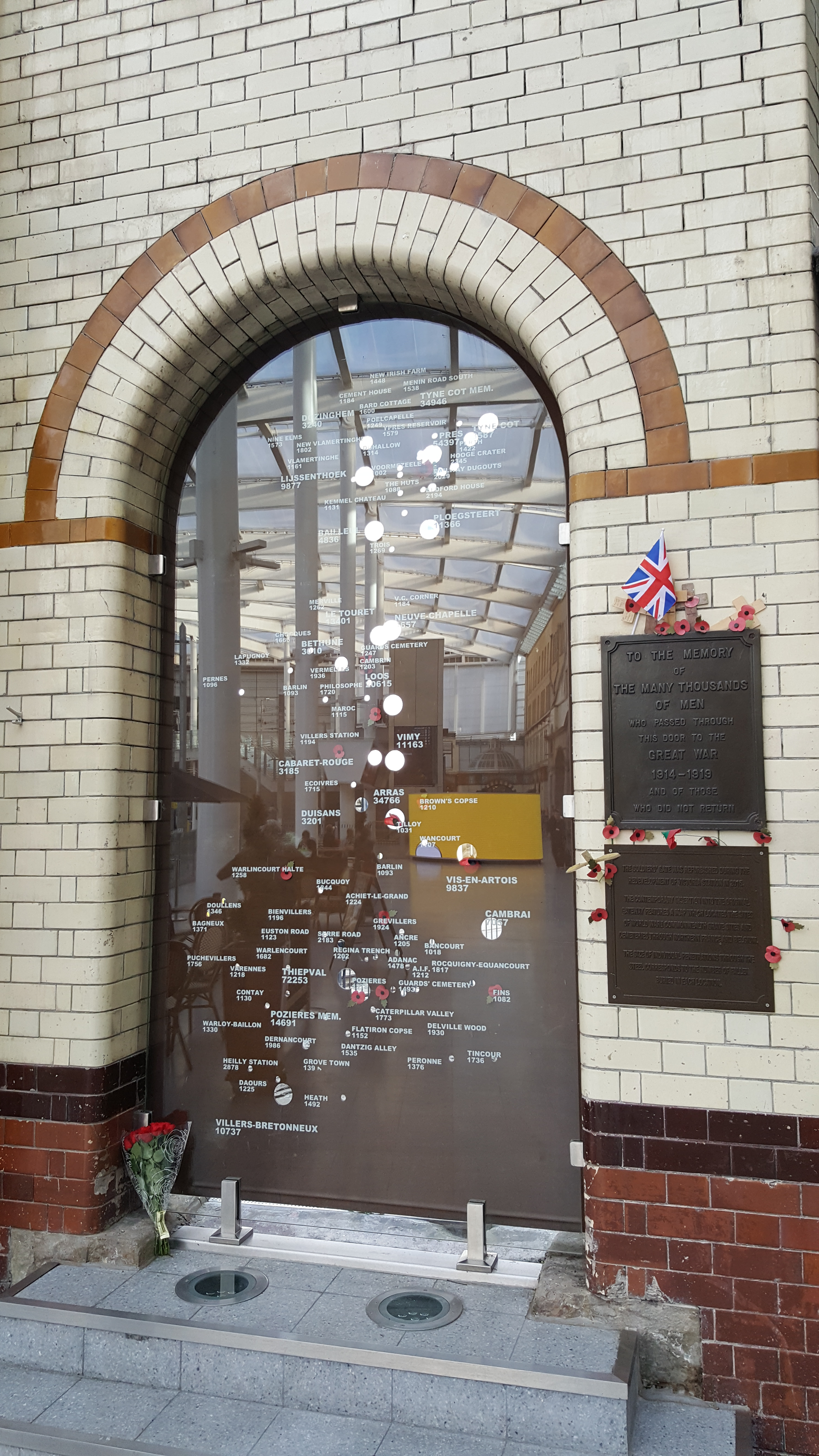
Soldiers' Gate.

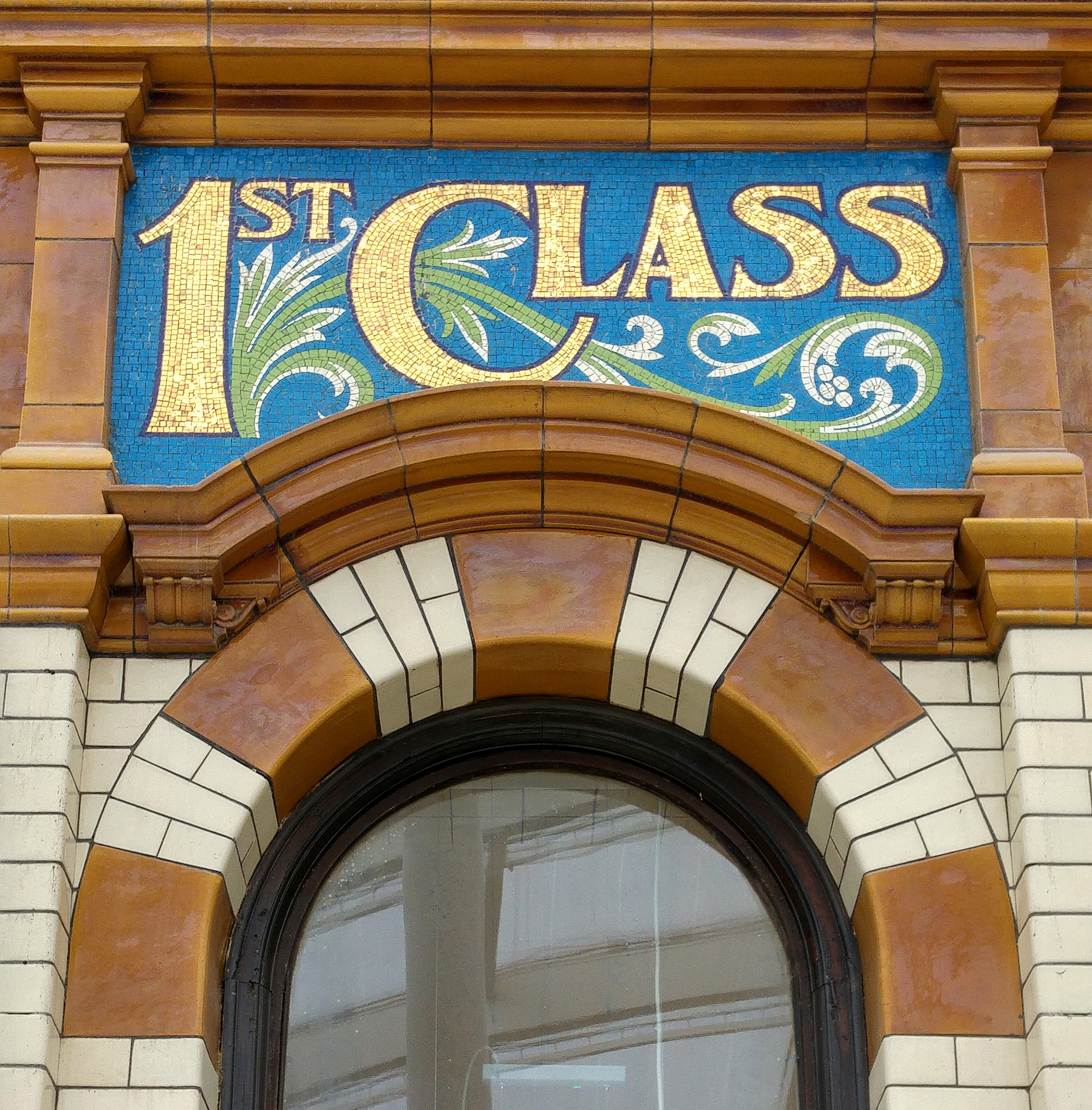
1st class mosaic.

== National Rail services ==
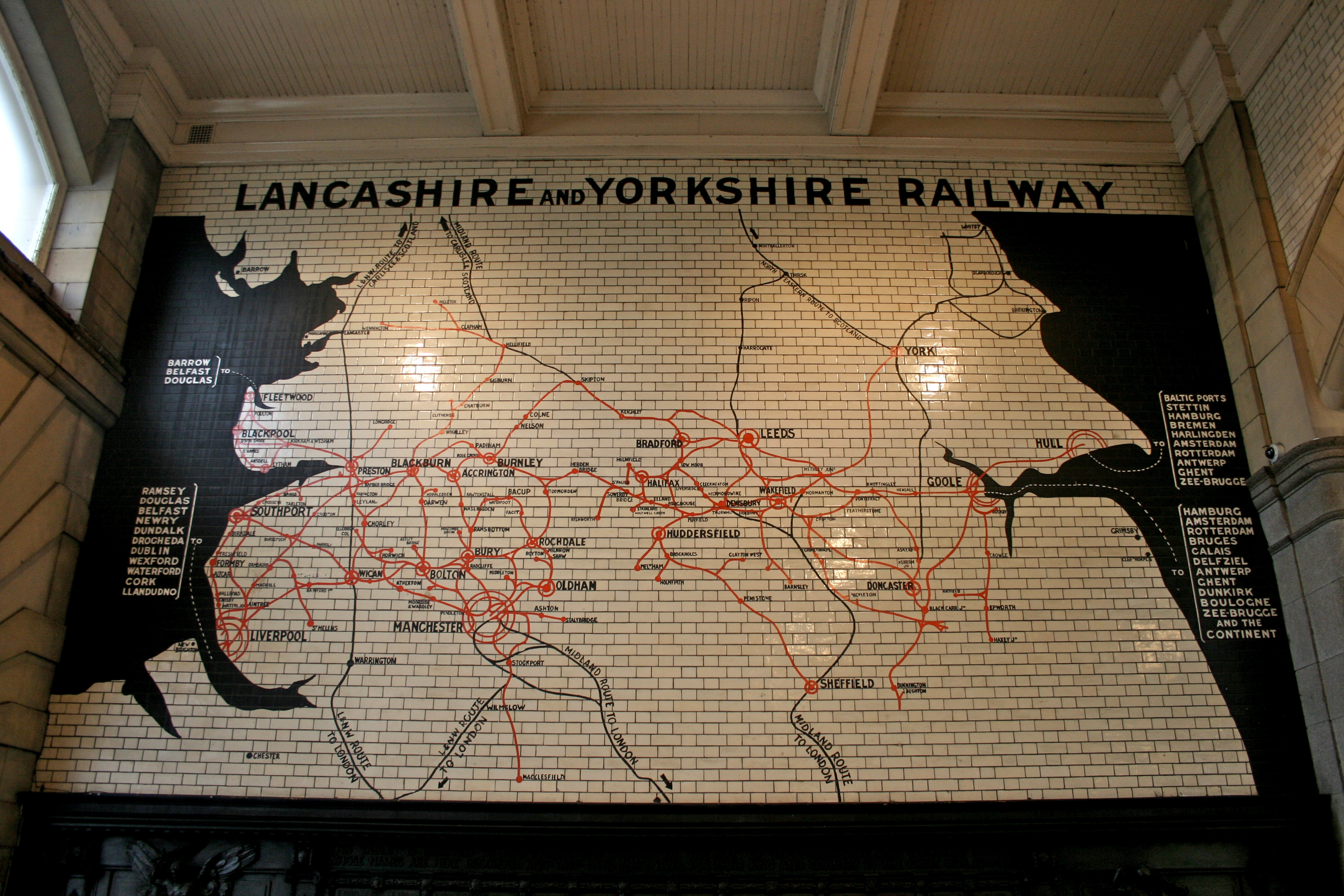
Tiled Lancashire and Yorkshire Railway map

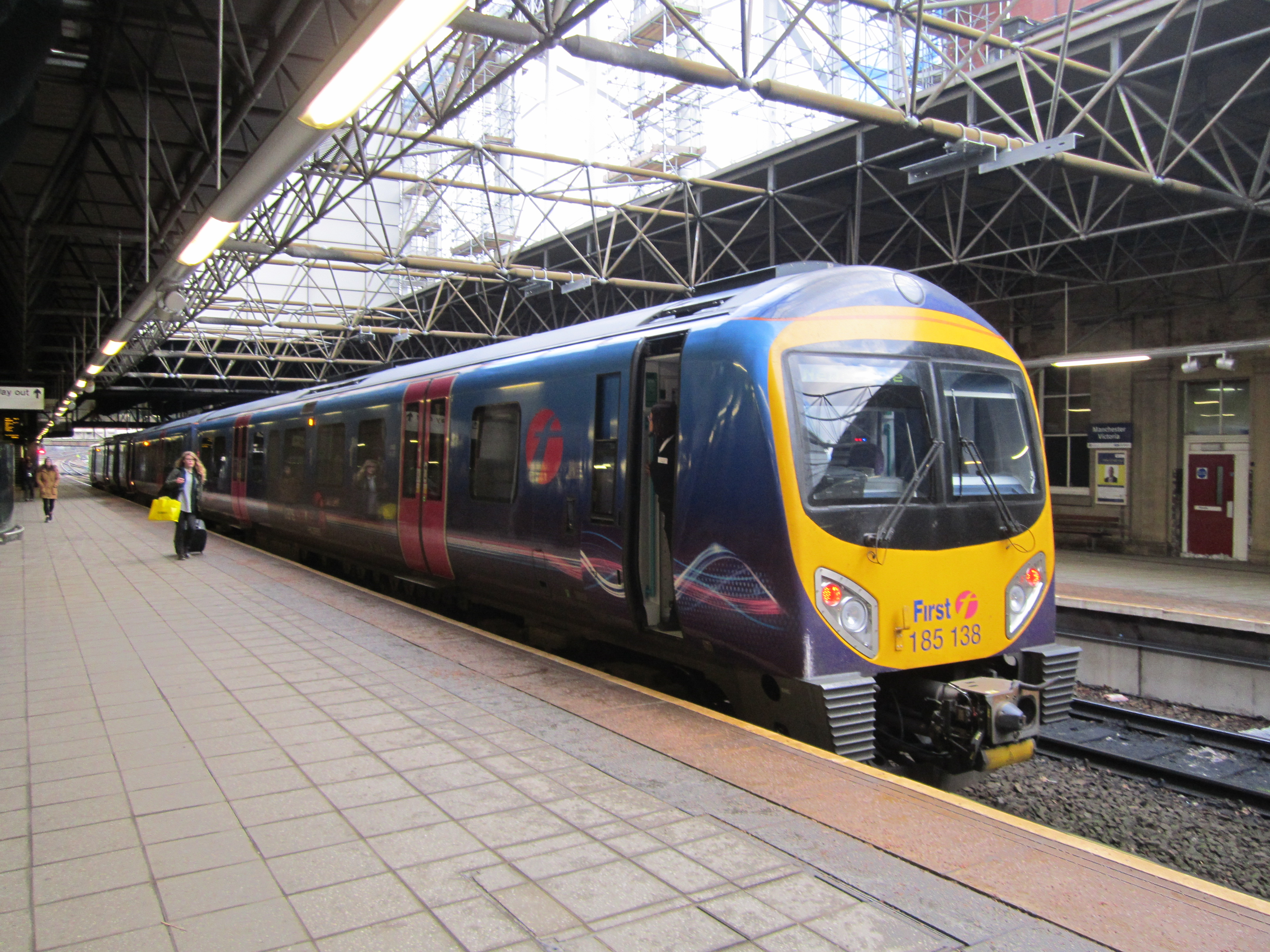
TransPennine Express class 185 train at platform 4.

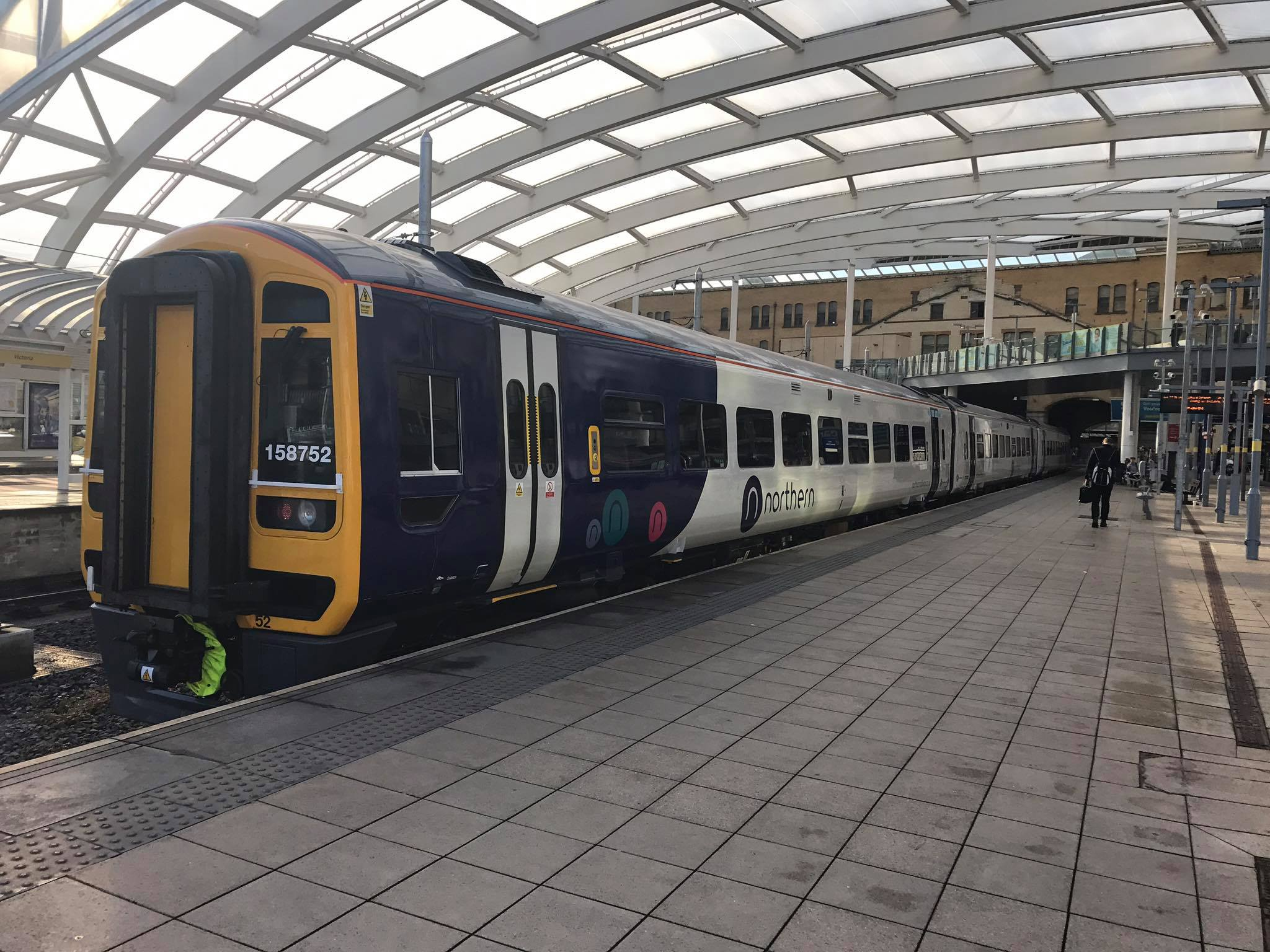
Arriva Rail North Class 158 unit at bay platform 1.

Manchester Victoria is served by two train operating companies:

- Northern Trains
- TransPennine Express.

It is occasionally used by CrossCountry services during engineering works.

The Chat Moss route to Liverpool is operated by TransPennine Express Class 185s DMUs and Northern Trains Class 769 BMMUs (peak time & early morning only). The Ribble Valley Line to Blackburn and Clitheroe is operated by Class 156 and Class 150. Leeds Calder Valley services are usually operated by Class 158 Sprinter DMUs, though Class 195 Civity units are now used on many Chester trains.

Since the May 2018 timetable change, all express services on the North TransPennine route call at the station. These services are run by TransPennine Express. Westbound, two trains an hour run express to Liverpool Lime Street (one calling at Lea Green and the other calling at Newton-le-Willows). The other pair of services run westbound to Manchester Airport via the Ordsall Chord and Manchester Piccadilly. Eastbound, there are 4 trains per hour running via Huddersfield, Leeds and York. After York, one train an hour ran to each of Edinburgh, Newcastle, Redcar Central and Scarborough.

From the winter 2023 timetable change, the service was somewhat reduced (due to ongoing staffing issues at the TOC), with only the hourly Liverpool - Newcastle and Manchester Airport - Saltburn calling here. However, as of the December 2024 timetable changes, the former service pattern was restored, and 4 trains per hour operate between Manchester Victoria and Leeds via Huddersfield.

Also since the May 2018 timetable change, services along the Calder Valley line have been significantly sped up. Stations between Rochdale and Manchester are now served by Blackburn services. This means that Calder Valley services now run non-stop between Rochdale and Manchester. As a result, there are now 6 trains an hour to Rochdale.

=== Service summary ===
==== Westbound services ====
- 1tph to Southport (via Bolton and Wigan Wallgate)
- 2tph to Wigan Wallgate via Atherton; 1tph continues to Headbolt Lane
- 1tph to Chester via Warrington Bank Quay
- 2tph to Blackburn via Bolton, 1tph continues to Clitheroe
- 2tph to Liverpool Lime Street (via Chat Moss line, express - limited stopping service also operates during peak hours)
- 1tph to Manchester Airport

==== Eastbound services ====
- 2tph to Rochdale (stopping)
- 3tph to Leeds via Rochdale, of which 2 operate via Bradford Interchange, & 1 via Brighouse
- 1tph to Blackburn via Rochdale & Todmorden
- 1tph to Stalybridge (stopping)
- 1tph to Hull via Leeds
- 1tph to Scarborough via Leeds
- 1tph to Newcastle via Leeds
- 1tph to Redcar Central via Leeds

Preceding station	National Rail	Following station
Manchester Oxford Road	TransPennine Express; North TransPennine	Stalybridge
Newton-le-Willows	TransPennine Express; North TransPennine	Stalybridge
Newton-le-Willows	TransPennine Express; North TransPennine	Huddersfield
Lea Green	TransPennine Express; North TransPennine	Huddersfield
Terminus	Northern Trains; Calder Valley line	Moston
Terminus	Northern Trains; Calder Valley line	Rochdale
Terminus	Northern Trains; Huddersfield line	Ashton-under-Lyne
Salford Central	Northern Trains; Ribble Valley line	Terminus
Terminus	Northern Trains; Ribble Valley line	Moston
Salford Central	Northern Trains; Manchester to Preston Line	Terminus
Salford Central	Northern Trains; Manchester to Southport Line	Terminus
Salford Central	Northern Trains; Kirkby branch line	Terminus
Eccles	Northern Trains; Liverpool to Manchester Line	Terminus
Newton-le-Willows	Northern Trains; Chester to Leeds	Rochdale
	Historical Railways	
Terminus	L&YR Caldervale Line	Miles Platting
Terminus	L&YR Huddersfield Line	Miles Platting
Manchester Exchange	London and North Western Railway Manchester-Liverpool Line	Terminus

== Victoria tram stop ==
Victoria
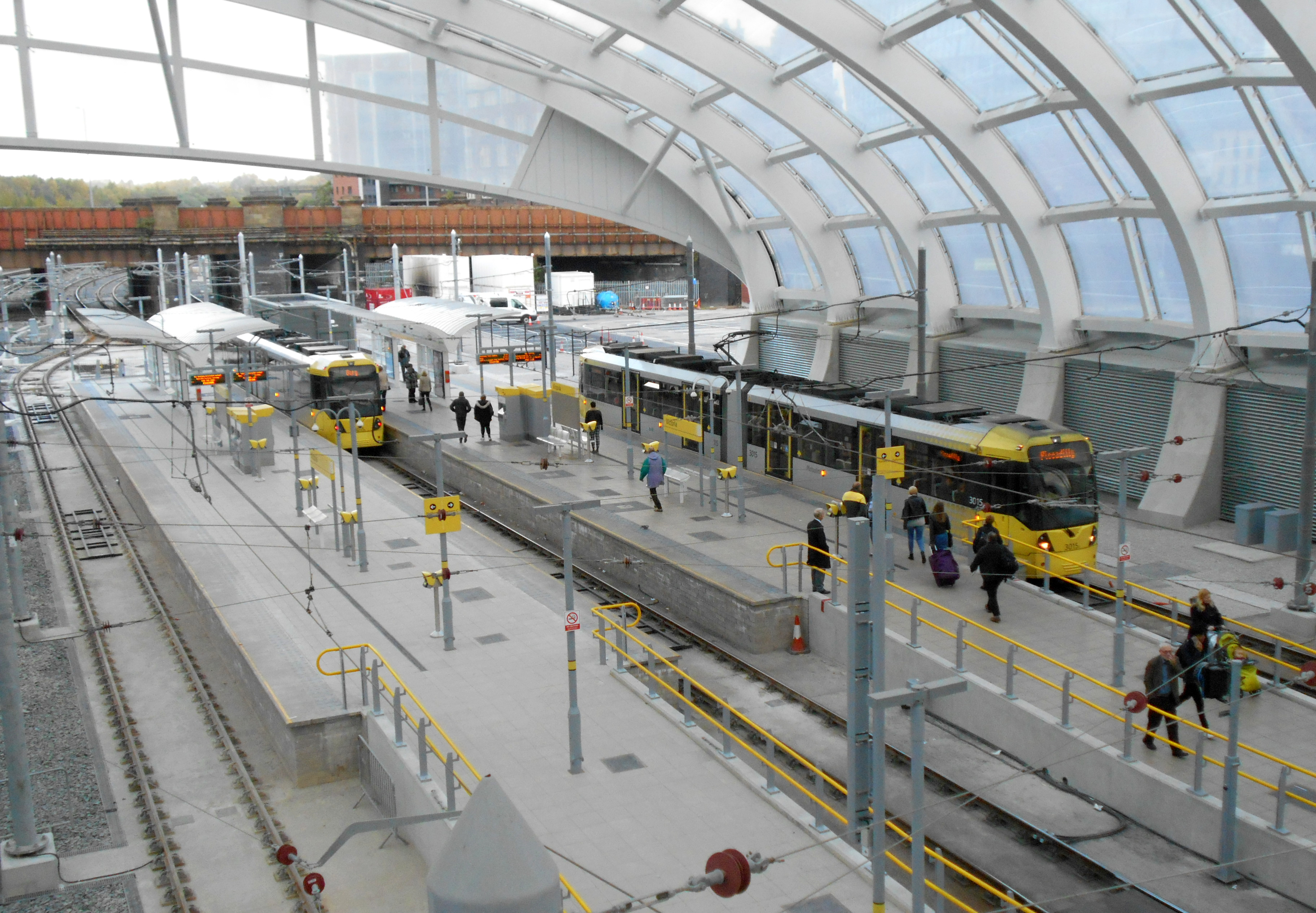
- Victoria tram stop in 2015

General information
- Location: Manchester city centre, City of Manchester; England
- Coordinates: 53.48774°N 2.24171°W
- Grid reference: SJ840990
- System: Metrolink station
- Line: Bury Line
- Platforms: 4

Other information
- Status: In operation
- Fare zone: 1

Key dates
- 6 April 1992: Conversion to Metrolink operation
Route map
Location

Manchester Victoria is an interchange with the city's Metrolink light rail system. The stop is at the northern edge of the system's Zone 1 and the start of the Bury Line.

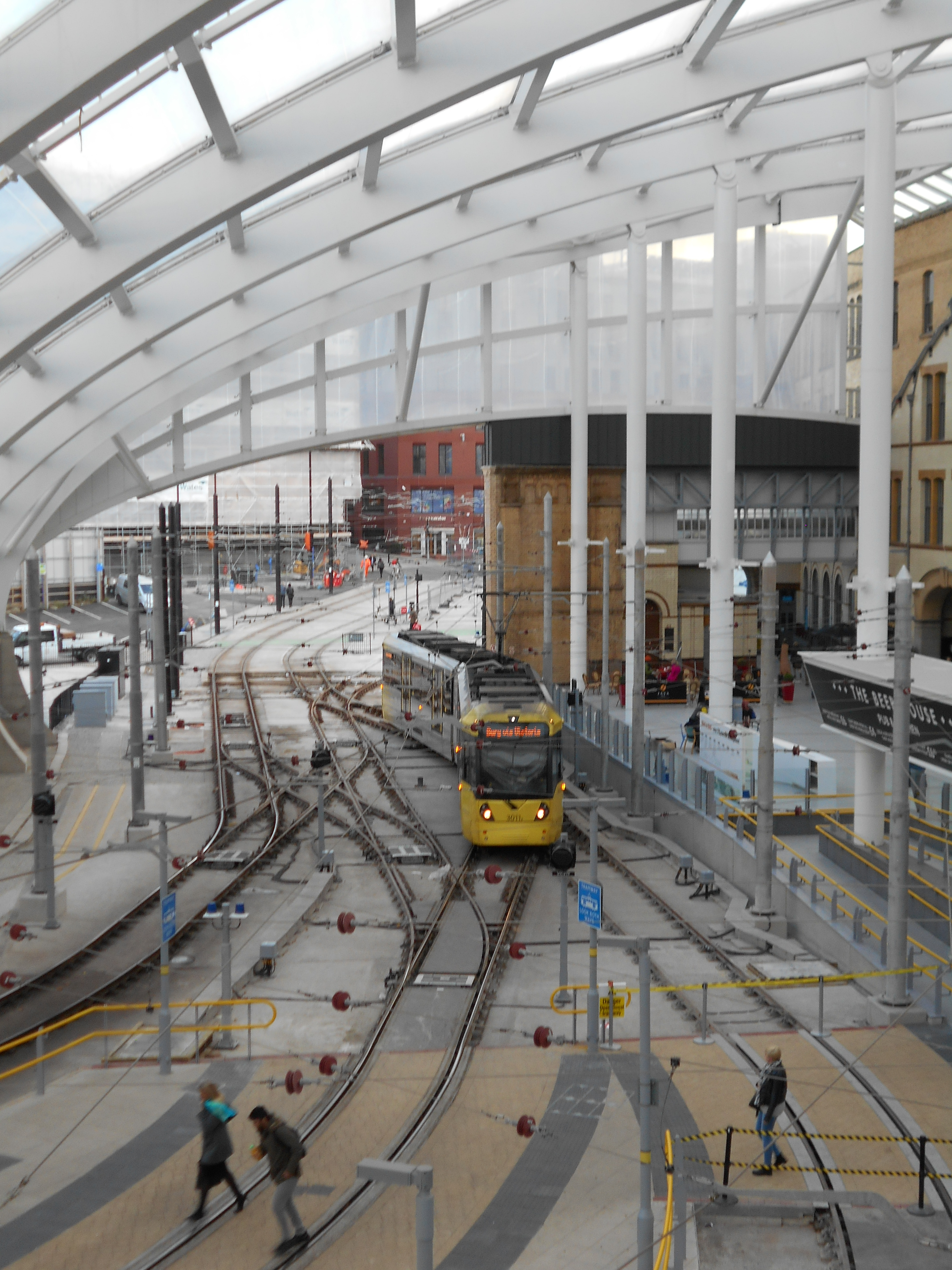
A tram entering Victoria from the city-centre streets

The tram platforms opened on 6 April 1992 for services to Bury, which replaced the long-established heavy rail service. The tram platforms were built on the site of the former railway platforms 5 to 8, the terminus of the Bury line. The line was extended into the city-centre streets via a sharp curve south from the platform ends and out through a new entrance in the wall at the side of the station; The system operates on some British Rail lines that have been converted to light rail operation and on-street tram tracks. In October 2009 the Oldham Loop Line was closed for conversion to a Metrolink line. It was completed in March 2014 after reopening in stages to Rochdale town centre.

The 1992 Metrolink platforms consisted of an island platform containing platforms B and C, and a side platform for Bury bound trams lettered A; this was later taken out of use due to leaks in the station roof.

The Metrolink platforms at Victoria closed on 21 February 2014 and were rebuilt in a different configuration to allow for increased services. The rebuilt stop reopened on 18 February 2015. The new configuration has two island platforms serving three tracks, with platform faces lettered A, B, C and D; the outer platforms A and D are for through trams, city-bound and northbound respectively; the centre platforms B and C, which both serve the same track, accommodate terminating Manchester Airport services as of 2024. The stop is one of the most used on the Metrolink network.

=== Metrolink services ===
As of 2024, Metrolink services run through Victoria to Altrincham, Bury, East Didsbury, Manchester Airport, Rochdale via Oldham, and Piccadilly. Services run every twelve minutes on each route at most operating times.

Preceding station	Manchester Metrolink	Following station
Shudehill towards Manchester Airport	Manchester Airport–Victoria	Terminus
Shudehill towards Altrincham	Altrincham–Bury (peak only)	Queens Road towards Bury
Shudehill towards Piccadilly	Piccadilly–Bury	Queens Road towards Bury
Exchange Square towards East Didsbury	East Didsbury–Shaw (peak only)	Monsall towards Shaw and Crompton
Exchange Square towards East Didsbury	East Didsbury–Rochdale	Monsall towards Rochdale Town Centre
Proposed
Shudehill towards Altrincham	Altrincham–Bury (peak only)	Sandhills towards Bury
Shudehill towards Piccadilly	Piccadilly–Bury	Sandhills towards Bury
Exchange Square towards East Didsbury	East Didsbury–Shaw (peak only)	Sandhills towards Shaw and Crompton
Exchange Square towards East Didsbury	East Didsbury–Rochdale	Sandhills towards Rochdale Town Centre

== Accidents and incidents ==
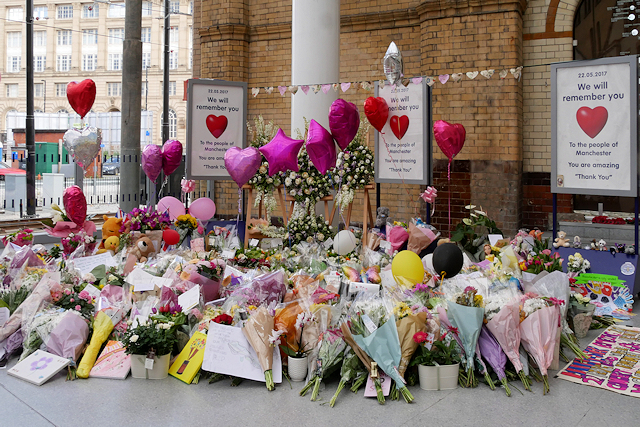
Memorial on the station concourse following the Manchester Arena bombing in May 2017. A dedicated remembrance space exists to this day.

- On 19 August 1918, an electric train collided with the buffers, injuring 29 people.
- On the early morning of 10 December 1947, a train of 20 tank wagons loaded with petrol ran out of control while descending the bank towards Victoria. To avoid a collision with another train, it was diverted into the empty bay at platform 7, where it crashed through the buffers at 25 mph (40 km/h), mounted the concourse, and came to a rest just short of the booking office. Swift action was taken to prevent an outbreak of fire. The train driver was killed in the collision, the fireman was injured and the guard suffered from shock.
- On 25 April 1994, two vehicles of a freight train derailed while passing through new platform 6, which had opened that day. The derailed vehicles damaged the platform edging stones along most of its length, putting it out of use until it was repaired.
- On 15 June 1996, a large truck bomb was detonated about 400 metres (1,300 ft) from the station by the Provisional IRA. The blast shattered many windows along the station's façade, and glass fell onto the glass canopy causing it serious damage. The station was closed for several days. The blast also damaged the glass and steel roof over the concourse and platforms, which resulted in the removal of much of the glasswork and cladding.
- On 18 October 2016, a panel of the roof, which had been built the year before, collapsed under the weight of rain water, causing minor injury to two people. The damage was blamed on seagulls weakening the structure by pecking at the roof.
- On 22 May 2017, the station was evacuated and closed and services were cancelled following the bombing at Manchester Arena which is partially above the station. The explosion took place in the public area linking the station to the arena immediately above the station's through platforms, causing structural damage to the station which was closed, resulting in significant disruption to train and tram services. The station reopened to traffic on 30 May 2017, following the police investigation and repairs to the fabric of the building. A memorial space created following the bombing exists adjacent to the 'Soldier's Gate' Memorial.
- On 31 December 2018, three people, including a police officer were stabbed at around 20:50 GMT. A man was held on suspicion of attempted murder.

== See also ==
- Listed buildings in Manchester-M3
