= Sandhills tram stop =

Proposed tram station in Manchester, England

Sandhills

General information
- Location: Collyhurst, Manchester; England
- Coordinates: 53.49500°N 2.22579°W
- System: Metrolink station
- Line: Bury Line
- Platforms: 2

Other information
- Fare zone: 2
Route map
Location

Sandhills is a proposed tram stop on the Bury Line and Oldham and Rochdale Line of Greater Manchester's Metrolink light rail system. It would be located immediately north of the Collyhurst Tunnel in Collyhurst between the Victoria and Queens Road stops, to the north of the city centre.

== Status ==
The stop is a proposal in the Greater Manchester Transport Strategy 2040 and was a manifesto commitment for Andy Burnham in the 2024 Greater Manchester mayoral election. It would support the proposed new town and inner-city development area of Victoria North.

Transport for Greater Manchester funding was confirmed for the stop in June 2025.

== Services ==
Preceding station	Manchester Metrolink	Following station
Proposed
Victoria towards Altrincham	Altrincham–Bury (peak only)	Queens Road towards Bury
Victoria towards Piccadilly	Piccadilly–Bury	Queens Road towards Bury
Victoria towards East Didsbury	East Didsbury–Shaw (peak only)	Monsall towards Shaw and Crompton
Victoria towards East Didsbury	East Didsbury–Rochdale	Monsall towards Rochdale Town Centre
