= Central Park tram stop =

Manchester Metrolink tram stop

Central Park
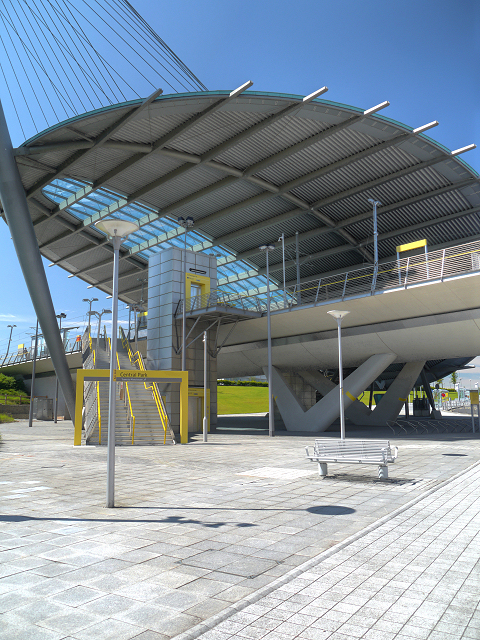
- Central Park Metrolink stop in 2012

General information
- Location: Newton Heath, Manchester; England
- Coordinates: 53.50160°N 2.19914°W
- System: Metrolink station
- Line: Oldham and Rochdale Line
- Platforms: 2

Other information
- Status: In operation
- Fare zone: 2

History
- Opened: 13 June 2012
- Original company: Metrolink
Route map
Location

Central Park is a tram stop on the Oldham and Rochdale Line (ORL) of Greater Manchester's light rail Metrolink system. It opened to passengers on 13 June 2012 as part of Phase 3a of Metrolink's expansion, and is located in the Newton Heath area of Manchester, England.

The station was constructed in 2005 but was unused until 2012.

The station serves the Central Park area, an urban renewal development project in north-east Manchester which includes the new headquarters of Greater Manchester Police and the Sharp Project. The station forms part of The Gateway, a £36.5 million transport interchange which will include local bus services as well as the Metrolink tram stop.

== Construction ==
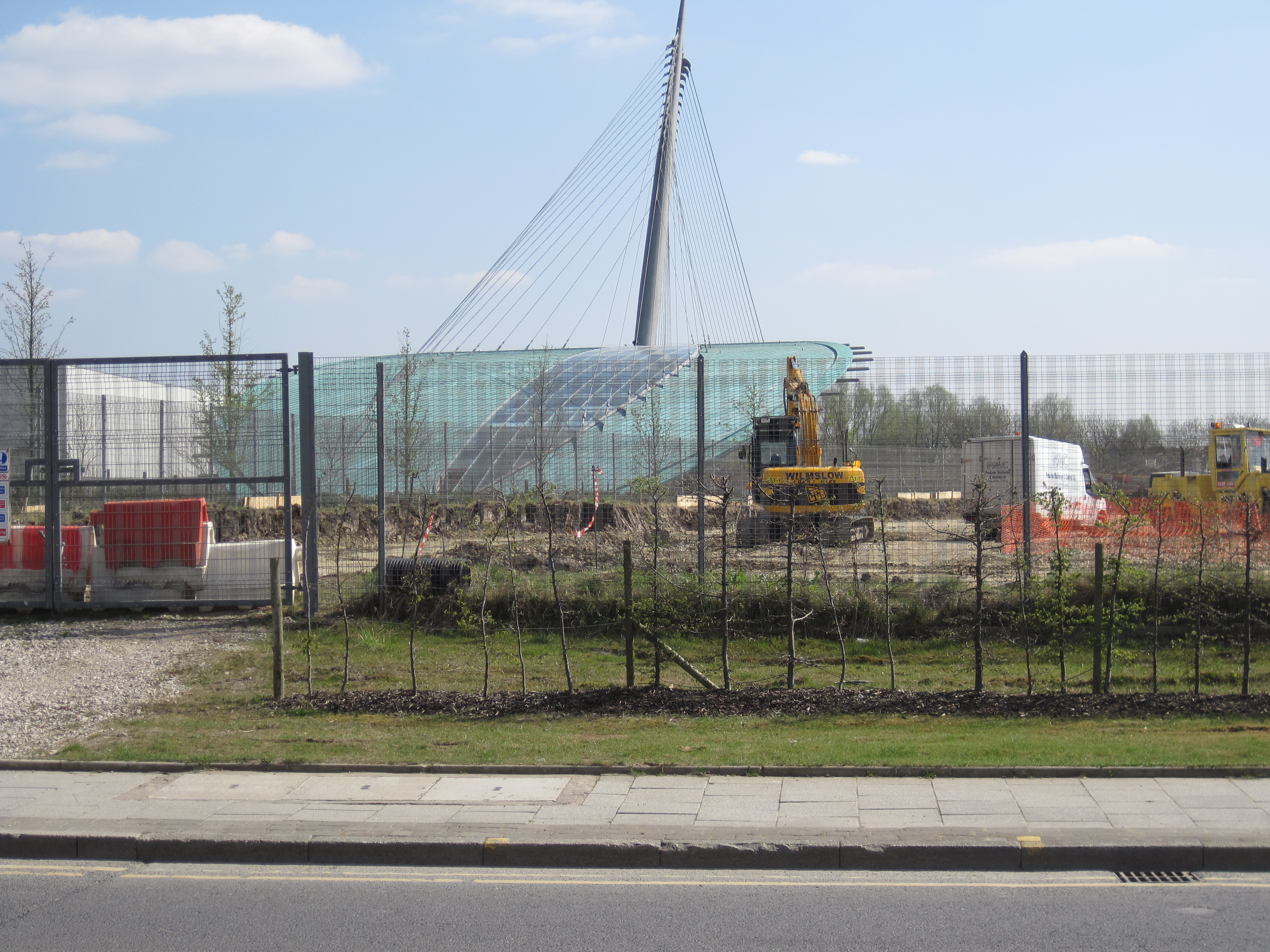
Construction in April 2010, 2 years prior to opening

The station building features a striking curved copper and glass canopy suspended by a cable-tensioned steel structure. It was designed by architects Aukett Fitzroy Robinson, whose work has included a number of projects for London Underground (including Clapham Common tube station, and the reconstruction of Farringdon and Blackfriars stations). It was completed in 2005 in readiness for the Metrolink extension through Oldham to Rochdale as part of Phase 3a of the Metrolink expansion project. However, due to funding problems and repeated project cancellations, the line extension remained unused for seven years. Although the station lies next to the Calder Valley railway line between Victoria and Rochdale (at the northern end of the old "Cheetham Hill Loop" line built by the L&YR in 1877 to avoid the notorious Miles Platting bank, which closed in 1998), there is no interchange with National Rail services. However, it is possible that railway platforms may be added in future.

Construction on the Metrolink line began in October 2009. It was originally projected that the station would open to trams from Manchester in November/December 2011 and a full service from Manchester to Rochdale to commence in spring 2012. The stop finally opened on 13 June 2012.

A bridge across the Calder Valley Line at Thorps Bridge Junction (where the Oldham Loop line formerly diverged) was also built in 2005 to the east of the station - this forms the continuation of the Metrolink route.

== Service pattern ==
Preceding station	Manchester Metrolink	Following station
Monsall towards East Didsbury	East Didsbury–Rochdale	Newton Heath and Moston towards Rochdale Town Centre
Monsall towards East Didsbury	East Didsbury–Shaw (peak only)	Newton Heath and Moston towards Shaw and Crompton

== Connecting bus routes ==
Central Park station is not served by any direct bus service but several services do stop nearby. First Greater Manchester services 88, which runs a circular route with buses running to Manchester Piccadilly Gardens or to Manchester Shudehill via White Moss, Higher Blackley and North Manchester General Hospital stop on Northampton Road, along with Stagecoach Manchester service 80, which runs westbound to Manchester and eastbound to Middleton via Moston.

On Oldham Road, First services 83, 180 and 184 provide frequent buses between Manchester and Oldham with the 83 continuing to Sholver and the 180/184 running to Saddleworth plus Huddersfield (184). First services 24, 181 and 182 also run from Manchester to Rochdale via Chadderton, Royton and Shaw and Crompton (181/182). Stagecoach service 72 runs from Manchester to Chadderton.

Service 114 runs from Manchester to Alkrington via Greengate and Broadhurst.
