= Monsall tram stop =

Manchester Metrolink tram stop

Monsall
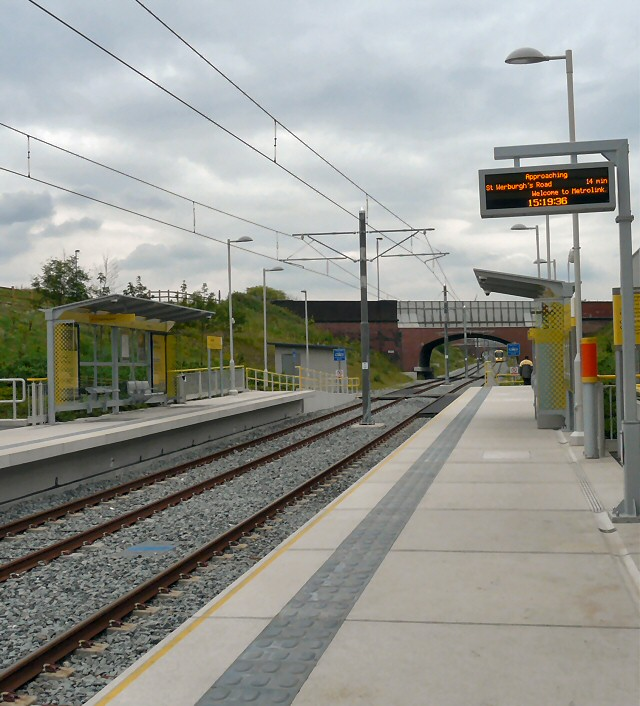
- Monsall tram stop on its opening day

General information
- Location: Monsall, Manchester; England
- Coordinates: 53.50110°N 2.21067°W
- System: Metrolink station
- Line: Oldham and Rochdale Line
- Platforms: 2

Other information
- Status: In operation
- Fare zone: 2

History
- Opened: 13 June 2012
- Original company: Metrolink
Route map
Location

Monsall is a tram stop on the Oldham and Rochdale Line (ORL) of Greater Manchester's light-rail Metrolink system in the Monsall area of Manchester in North West England. The Oldham and Rochdale line was built as part of Phase 3a of the system's expansion, on most of the route of the former Oldham Loop Line, and opened to passengers on 13 June 2012.

However, this station in particular is on the ex-Lancashire and Yorkshire Railway's Cheetham Hill Loop line between the former Thorpe's Bridge Junction (near Newton Heath TMD) and Irk Valley Junction, where the Oldham route joins the line from Bury en route to Victoria. This line had previously been used by Manchester to Rochdale and Leeds services via the Caldervale Line to avoid the notorious Miles Platting incline and also by trains accessing the Red Bank carriage sidings until its closure in 1998 as part of the Manchester North re-signalling scheme.

== Service pattern ==
Preceding station	Manchester Metrolink	Following station
Victoria towards East Didsbury	East Didsbury–Rochdale	Central Park towards Rochdale Town Centre
Victoria towards East Didsbury	East Didsbury–Shaw (peak only)	Central Park towards Shaw and Crompton
Proposed
Sandhills towards East Didsbury	East Didsbury–Rochdale	Central Park towards Rochdale Town Centre
Sandhills towards East Didsbury	East Didsbury–Shaw (peak only)	Central Park towards Shaw and Crompton

== Connecting bus routes ==
151 runs nearby and operates between Hightown and Hollinwood.

114 also stops by here, operating past another tram stop Central Park, and then via Broadhurst, Moston, Greengate, and Alkrington. In the other direction, it operates to Manchester Piccadilly Gardens.

688 and 702 also run closeby.
