= Timeline of Manchester Metrolink =

This timeline lists significant events in the history of Greater Manchester's light rail network called the Manchester Metrolink.

== 1960s ==
1968

- The Transport Act 1968 sets out terms under which passenger transport executives and passenger transport authorities are to be formed to co-ordinate and operate public transport in the United Kingdom's six largest conurbations outside London.

1969

- SELNEC PTE (South East Lancashire North East Cheshire Passenger Transport Executive) is established on 1 November 1969 with reference to the Transport Act 1968 to improve public transport in Manchester and its surrounding municipalities.

== 1970s ==
1972

- The Picc-Vic tunnel receives planning approval from the Parliament of the United Kingdom.
- The Local Government Act 1972 receives Royal Assent on 26 October 1972. The Act sets out provisions to reform local government in England by creating a system of two-tier metropolitan and non-metropolitan counties and districts across the country. Manchester and its surrounding municipalities are to be amalgamated as a metropolitan county.

1973

- A government grant to fund the £86 million Picc-Vic tunnel is rejected amid a weak economic climate.
- The United Kingdom local elections of 12 April 1973 creates the Greater Manchester County Council (GMCC) as a shadow authority.

1974

- The Greater Manchester County Council publishes its structure plan in January 1974, acknowledging its obligation to provide "an integrated and efficient system of public transport".
- Greater Manchester is formally established as a metropolitan county of England on 1 April 1974; SELNEC PTE becomes the Greater Manchester Passenger Transport Executive (GMPTE), a functional body of the Greater Manchester County Council tasked with operating and improving public transport in the region.
- Greater Manchester County Council submit a bid to the United Kingdom Government to acquire funding for the Picc-Vic tunnel.

1977

- Unable to secure funding from the government, the Greater Manchester County Council abandons plans for the Picc-Vic tunnel on economic grounds.

== 1980s ==
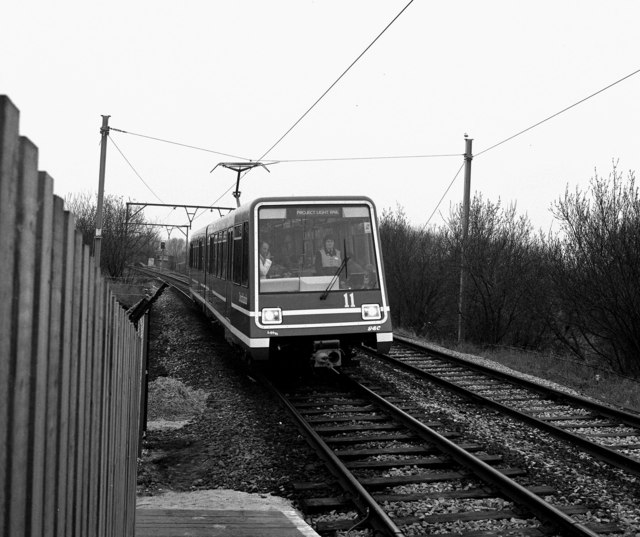
Docklands Light Railway rolling stock on public display in Debdale Park on 9 February 1987

1982

- GMPTE conclude that an over-ground metropolitan light rail system to replace or complement the region's under-used heavy railways is the most economical solution to improving Greater Manchester's public transport network.

1983

- As part of its proposals for light rail, GMPTE suggest that the Oldham Loop Line be re-routed and extended with on-street tramways through Oldham and Rochdale town centres.
- The Greater Manchester County Council purchases a disused section of the Cheshire Lines Committee railway between Chorlton-cum-Hardy and Didsbury for £1, hoping to stop development along the route and preserve it for use with a future light rail network.

1984

- A Rail Study Group composed of officials from British Rail, Greater Manchester County Council and GMPTE, formally endorse a light rail system for Greater Manchester.
- Proposals are released for a 62-mile (100 km) network consisting of three lines between: Altrincham-Hadfield, Bury-Marple and Rochdale-East Didsbury.

1985

- The Local Government Act 1985 receives Royal Assent on 16 July 1985, stating that "the Greater London Council; and the metropolitan county councils" shall cease to exist.

1986

- The Greater Manchester County Council is abolished on 31 March 1986 under the Local Government Act 1985. GMPTE becomes a joint-board of the ten district councils of Greater Manchester.
- GMPTE propose that Greater Manchester's light rail system include a line to Salford Quays to complement the regeneration of the Manchester Docks.

1987

- A trial and public demonstration on 9 February 1987 uses Docklands Light Railway rolling stock on the freight-only Fallowfield Loop line adjacent to Debdale Park in Gorton.

1988

- Plans to create a light rail line through Oldham and Rochdale town centres are laid before the Parliament of the United Kingdom.
- The name Metrolink and a system-wide aquamarine, black and grey corporate branding and vehicle livery is revealed at a press launch in June 1988.

1989

- On 27 September 1989, following a two-stage tender exercise, the Greater Manchester Passenger Transport Authority award a contract to the GMA Group (a consortium composed of AMEC, GM Buses, John Mowlem & Company and a General Electric Company subsidiary) who in turn form Greater Manchester Metro Limited to design, build, operate and maintain Phase 1 of Metrolink.
- Michael Portillo approves the Metrolink construction contract on behalf of the Department for Transport on 24 October 1989.

== 1990s ==
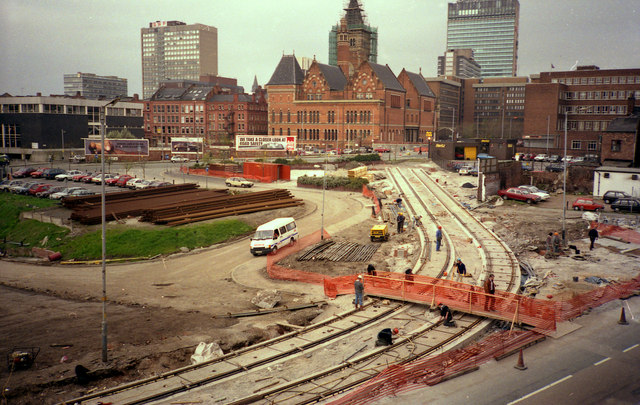
Metrolink under construction in 1991, as viewed from Manchester Piccadilly railway station

1990

- The contract to design, build, maintain and operate Metrolink is formally signed on 6 June 1990.
- Legal authority to construct a Metrolink line to Salford Quays is acquired.

1991

- The Bury Line between Manchester and Bury is closed in stages between 13 July 1991 and 17 August 1991. Its 1,200 V DC third rail electrified line is adapted for a 750 V DC overhead line operation.

1992

- 6 April 1992: Metrolink begins its first passenger service on a route between Victoria–Bury.
- 27 April 1992: Metrolink services expand beyond Victoria–G-Mex (now Deansgate-Castlefield) through a street-running section via Market Street and St Peter's Square.
- 15 June 1992: The G-Mex–Altrincham section of the Metrolink, called the Altrincham Line, joins the network.
- 17 July 1992: Elizabeth II declares Metrolink open at a ceremony in Manchester, stating that Metrolink would "improve communication" between northern and southern Greater Manchester. A plaque is shown on the northern end of St Peter's Square Platform C.
- 20 July 1992: A spur from Piccadilly Gardens to the like named tram stop and further to Manchester Piccadilly station is opened, creating a 'delta' junction where the spur began. Piccadilly tram stop was originally referred to as, or named Piccadilly Undercroft.

1994

- A public consultation and public inquiry result in government endorsement of a Metrolink line to Salford Quays in 1994.

1995

- In autumn 1995 a 4-mile (6.4 km) Metrolink line branching from the to-be-built Cornbrook tram stop to Eccles via Salford Quays is confirmed as Phase 2 of Metrolink.

1997

- April 1997: Altram, a consortium of the Serco, Gio. Ansaldo & C. and John Laing is appointed to construct the Eccles line; Serco takes on responsibility to operate and maintain the whole network under contract.
- Serco Metrolink, a wholly owned subsidiary of Serco Limited, take over the operations and maintenance of Metrolink on 26 May 1997.
- Construction of the Eccles Line officially begins on 17 July 1997.

1999

- The Eccles Line is officially opened as far as Broadway tram stop on 6 December 1999 by Prime Minister, Tony Blair, who praises Metrolink as "exactly the type of scheme needed to solve the transport problems of the metropolitan areas of the country".

== 2000s ==
2000

- Services from Broadway to Eccles Interchange join the network on 21 July 2000, completing Phase 2.

2001

- The Eccles Line is declared open by Anne, Princess Royal at a ceremony on 9 January 2001.

2003

- March 2003: Serco Investments buy out its partners; Altram (Manchester) Limited becomes a wholly owned subsidiary of Serco.
- 31 March 2003: A new Metrolink stop opens at Shudehill, serving Shudehill Interchange.

2004

- 31 August 2004: A derailment occurs at Shudehill.

2005

- 11 January 2005: A derailment occurs on London Road.
- April 2005: Work on Central Park tram stop and a bridge over the heavy Calder Valley Line commences.
- 8 November 2005: A near miss occurs between two track workers and a tram; the tram ran over track maintenance equipment.

2006

- 22 March 2006: T-68 tram #1011 bound for Altrincham (from Bury) exiting Victoria derails just before getting onto the street on Long Millgate at 08:03, as a result of a track defect. After the derailment, the tram travelled an extra 44 metres (144 ft) before stopping. Damage occurred to 0.6 metres (2 ft 0 in) of track was damaged, and services were suspended on the Bury Line. The track repairs took place at 17:00, and normal service resumed the following day.
- 20 May 2006: A person becomes trapped under a Metrolink vehicle, causing a three-hour delay on the system.
- 5 July 2006: It is announced that Metrolink will be extended to Droylsden, Rochdale and Chorlton - however plans to extend the line from Droylsden to Ashton-under-Lyne, and a new line to Wythenshawe and Manchester Airport are shelved, also including extending the line from Chorlton to Didsbury.

2007

- 17 January 2007: A derailment occurs at Pomona tram stop.
- July 2007: A ten-year contract to operate Metrolink was awarded to Stagecoach Metrolink, a subsidiary of the Stagecoach Group.
- July 2007: GMPTE and the Association of Greater Manchester Authorities (AGMA) submit a joint bid to the Transport Innovation Fund in order to procure a multi-million pound sum for public transport improvements linked to an anti-road traffic congestion strategy.
- July 2007: 1960s track on the Bury and Altrincham Lines is replaced at a cost of around £100 million.

2008

- 29 June 2008: A derailment occurs at the junction of Princess and Mosley Street in central Manchester.
- 19 December 2008: A referendum on the Greater Manchester Transport Innovation Fund is held in Greater Manchester, in which 79% of voters reject plans for public transport improvements linked to a peak-time weekday-only Greater Manchester congestion charge.

2009

- May 2009: Greater Manchester Integrated Transport Authority (formerly GMPTA) and AGMA agree to create the Greater Manchester Transport Fund, £1.5 billion raised from a combination of a levy on council tax in Greater Manchester, government grants, contributions from the Manchester Airports Group, Metrolink fares and third-party funding for "major transport schemes" in the region.
- 3 October 2009: The last Oldham Loop Line train leaves Manchester Victoria at 23:28 (scheduled for 23:25) and closes for conversion from heavy rail to Metrolink.
- 21 December 2009: Following test runs in November, the first new M5000 tram enters service.

== 2010s ==
2010

- 8 March 2010: Phase 3b is approved with funding on a line-by-line basis.
- 30 July 2010: The £1.5 billion Phase 3b funding is completed.
- 20 September 2010: The MediaCityUK spur off of the Eccles Line to MediaCityUK tram stop opens to passengers. G-Mex tram stop is renamed to Deansgate-Castlefield on the same day.

2011

- March 2011: Construction work on Phase 3b begins.
- 1 April 2011: The Greater Manchester Combined Authority is established; GMPTE becomes Transport for Greater Manchester (TfGM) and receives additional powers over transport in Greater Manchester.
- 5 June 2011: A pedestrian is struck by a Metrolink vehicle at Piccadilly Gardens. The pedestrian dies later in hospital.
- July 2011: Kingsway Business Park tram stop is authorised; Drake Street tram stop is abandoned on technical and economic grounds.
- 7 July 2011: The first part of the South Manchester Line is opened between Trafford Bar and St Werburgh's Road.
- 1 August 2011: RATP Group buys the operating concession from Stagecoach Group.

2012

- 13 June 2012: Services from Victoria to the temporary Oldham Mumps stop (on the former railway trackbed) commence.
- 25 November 2012: On the Airport Line, a bridge over the M56 motorway, north of Hollyhedge Road in Wythenshawe, is installed (overnight 24 and 25 November).
- 16 December 2012: Services on the Oldham and Rochdale Line from the temporary Oldham Mumps stop to Shaw and Crompton commence.
- 21 December 2012: A derailment occurs at Market Street, Manchester.

2013

- 6 February 2013: A heavy goods vehicle collides with a tram in Weaste.
- 11 February 2013: The Phase 3a element of the East Manchester Line opens to the general public, adding 8 new stops to the network at New Islington, Holt Town, Etihad Campus, Velopark, Clayton Hall, Edge Lane, Cemetery Road, and Droylsden. Driver training begins on the Oldham and Rochdale Line between Shaw and Crompton and Rochdale Railway Station on the same day.
- 28 February 2013: Phase 3a is completed with the extension of services along the Oldham and Rochdale Line from Shaw and Crompton and Rochdale Railway Station. Metrolink becomes 43 miles (69 km) in system length.
- 18 May 2013: The last tram to leave Mosley Street tram stop was 3018 on a service to Altrincham at 00:55. The stop closed as part of a plan to remove a bottleneck in Manchester city centre.
- 23 May 2013: The 2.7-mile (4.3 km) extension of the South Manchester Line from St Werburgh's Road to East Didsbury opens three months ahead of schedule. It is the first Phase 3b section to open, and adds five stops to the network.
- 8 July 2013: TfGM announces that overnight testing is to commence soon on the Phase 3b routes between Rochdale Railway Station–Rochdale Town Centre, and Droylsden–Ashton-under-Lyne.
- 31 July 2013: A man walks in front of a tram at Freehold. Paramedics pronounce him dead at the scene.
- 1 August 2013: A car collides with a tram on Mosley Street in Manchester city centre.
- 3 August 2013: Tram 3056, which was not in service, derails at the entrance to Queens Road depot.
- 19 August 2013: The Institute of Economic Affairs publishes its appraisal of High Speed 2, raising concerns that the high-speed railway will require indirect taxpayer funding by way of providing additional or enhanced infrastructure to integrate it with local transport systems. It cites Metrolink as an example of a system that would require modification to accommodate HS2 in Manchester.
- 20 August 2013: Trams are tested on the Phase 3b route through Oldham town centre.
- late August 2013: A partnership consisting of Arup Group, Bennetts Associates, High Speed Two and Manchester City Council publish draft proposals on the remodelling of Manchester Piccadilly station and its surrounds to accommodate and capitalise on High Speed 2. Included are two options on how Metrolink could be modified at Piccadilly as part of remodelling and enhancement work.
- early September 2013: Trams are tested on the Phase 3b route between Droylsden and Ashton-under-Lyne tram stop.
- 10 September 2013: A full Tameside Council meeting is held. The opening date for the Phase 3b route between Droylsden and Ashton-under-Lyne is announced.
- mid-September 2013: to remodel the staff halt at Metrolink House in Cheetham Hill as Queens Road tram stop.
- 9 October 2013: The Metrolink extension of the East Manchester Line from Droylsden–Ashton-under-Lyne is opened to passengers.

2014

- 27 January 2014: The Metrolink's new street-running section through Oldham town centre is opened to passengers.
- 31 March 2014: The Rochdale town centre street-running section between Rochdale Railway Station–Rochdale Town Centre is opened. The first tram to depart Rochdale Town Centre did so at 05:53.
- 3 November 2014: The Airport Line from St Werburgh's Road – Manchester Airport opens to passengers.

2015

- 28 June 2015: St Peter's Square tram stop closes for redevelopment into a four platform stop.
- 4 July 2015: A tram derailed at St Werburgh's Road after vandals attacked the tram and the tracks.
- 6 December 2015: First part of the Second City Crossing opens between Victoria – Exchange Square.

2016

- 26 June 2016: Start of a two-month closure of the Eccles Line for essential track maintenance.
- 21 July 2016: A man was badly injured at St Werburgh's Road when his leg became trapped between a tram and the platform.

2017

- 26 February 2017: The Second City Crossing (2CC) fully opens between St Peter's Square and Victoria via Exchange Square.
- 15 July 2017: Keolis Amey take over from RATP Group as operator
- 22 July 2017: The entire network was shut down twice in one day due to multiple communication failures across the network.

2018

- 3 January 2018: A new pedestrian crossing was opened at the southern end of Crumpsall tram stop to allow step-free interchange between platforms.
- 13 January 2018: Overnight (13 and 14 January), the footbridge over Crumpsall tram stop was removed.
- 28 January 2018: Services from Manchester Airport–Deansgate-Castlefield were extended to run from Manchester Airport–Victoria via Market Street. The MediaCityUK–Piccadilly service was also extended to MediaCityUK–Etihad Campus, and the Altrincham–Etihad Campus service was reduced to Altrincham–Piccadilly.
- 1 February 2018: First track laid on the Trafford Park Line at Parkway Circle near Parkway tram stop.

2019

- 13 January 2019: New Metrolink ticket zones 1-4 launched.
- 20 March 2019: Near Altrincham tram stop in the afternoon, the Bombardier M5000 Metrolink vehicle 3006 becomes the first of the Metrolink's vehicles to have travelled a total of 1,000,000 km since being put into service.
- 15 July 2019: New "touch-in, touch-out" contactless payment method launched (adult fares only).
- 10 November 2019: The first test tram runs on the Trafford Park Line overnight between Pomona and Village.

== 2020s ==
2020

- 26 January 2020: Prices of fare zones for Metrolink change.
- 22 March 2020: The Trafford Park Line opens between Pomona and The Trafford Centre, which includes new stops at Wharfside, serving the Old Trafford Stadium closer and faster than Old Trafford tram stop, Imperial War Museum also serving IWM North closer and faster from the city centre by tram, Barton Dock Road, serving Trafford Palazzo, and other intermediate stops at Village and Parkway.
- 8 December 2020: At around 07:30, a tram collided with a van near Ashton West tram stop.

2021

- 27 July 2021: As over 20% of the Metrolink's workforce was off due to the COVID-19 pandemic, the enhanced service routes that operate during peak times to increase capacity (Altrincham–Bury, Shaw–East Didsbury etc.) could not do so, which forced the Metrolink to instead operate a Sunday service. Furthermore, as these extra services usually begin to leave the two depots after 6am, and more drivers called in sick, 'minor delays' were experienced on multiple lines from 7am: Altrincham, Oldham and Rochdale, and South Manchester. This was also happening alongside engineering works on the Eccles Line.
- 10 December 2021: A teenage boy was hit by a tram at around 17:00 GMT near Ashton Moss tram stop.

2022

- 6 October 2022: At around 12:35 BST, a woman was struck by a tram approaching St Werburgh's Road heading to East Didsbury, at the pedestrian track crossing at the west side of the stop.

2023

- 9 December 2023: Due to a piece of tarp on the overhead lines at Market Street, no services operated through Market Street or Shudehill from around 17:30. Services set to run through these stops were rerouted via Exchange Square. The Bury–Piccadilly route could not be rerouted, however, and this route was reduced to Bury–Victoria. The pantograph of tram fleet #3061, which was supposedly bound for Manchester Airport (unknown whether it was a double tram or single tram service) got caught in the tarp upon approaching Market Street. Furthermore, at around 20:00, services through Firswood tram stop operated at a greatly reduced speed due to a fallen tree on the overhead lines. In a similar incident, explosions were seen on overhead wires near Manchester Piccadilly railway station, as well as another fallen tree, and no trains could run through there and Manchester Oxford Road from around 21:00. Yet another fallen tree causes disruption between Hollinwood and Shaw and Crompton stops at around 21:40. These closures cause significant delays on the Pink and Grey routes (East Didsbury–Rochdale and East Didsbury–Shaw respectively).

2024

- 7 March 2024: A collision with a tram and a car occurs on Gainsboro Road near Snipe Retail Park and Audenshaw tram stop at around 06:15.
- 14 April 2024: The Metrolink's highest ever Sunday ridership was recorded at over 175,000 on the day of the Manchester Marathon. The previous record was around 145,000, set in 2023.

== See also ==
- List of tram and light-rail transit systems
- Manchester Corporation Tramways
- Transport in Manchester
