= Edge Lane tram stop =

Manchester Metrolink tram stop

Edge Lane
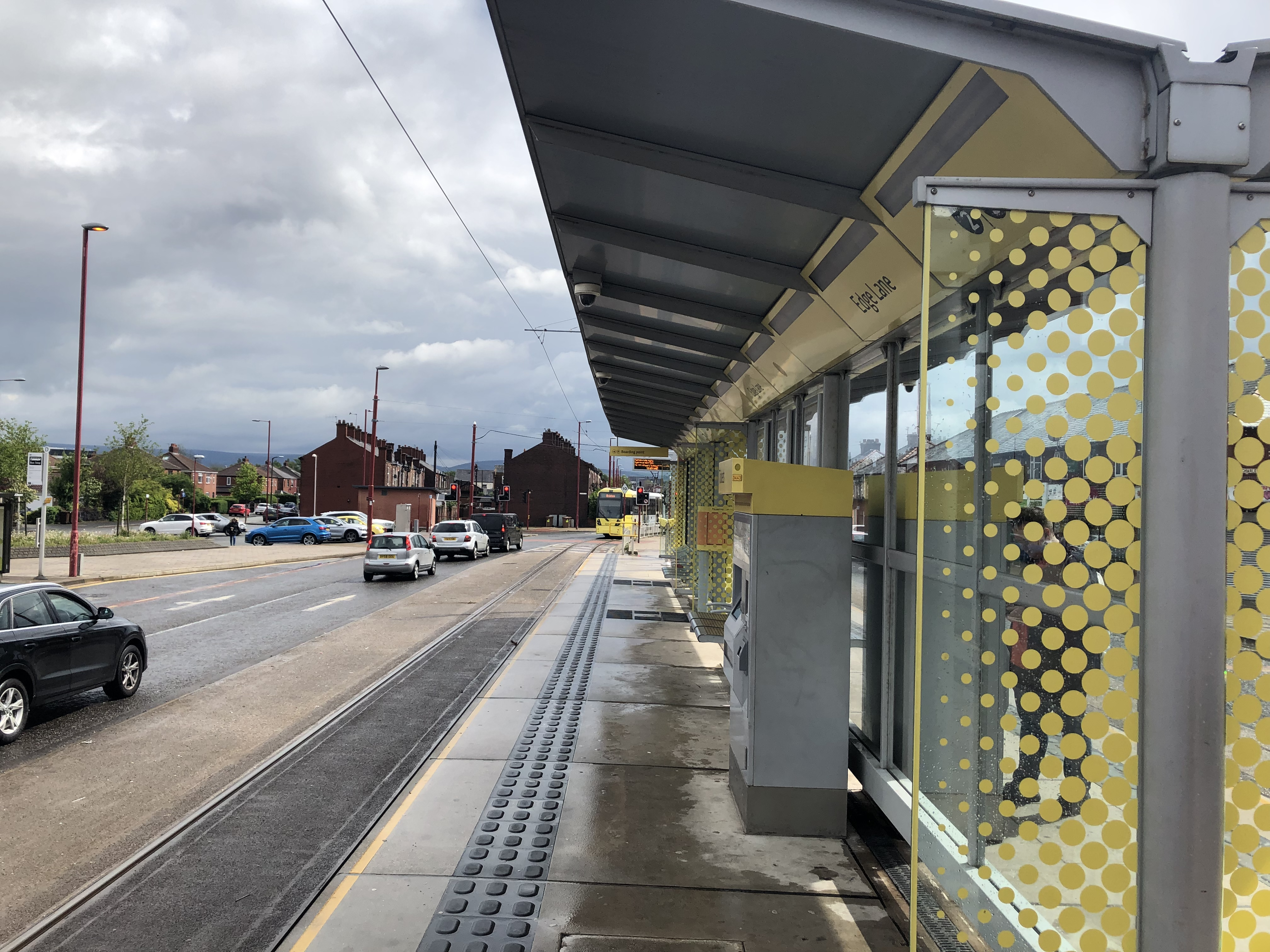
- Edge Lane tram stop in May 2019.

General information
- Location: Droylsden, Tameside; England
- Coordinates: 53.48089°N 2.16525°W
- System: Metrolink station
- Line: East Manchester Line
- Platforms: 2 (1 island)

Other information
- Status: In operation
- Fare zone: 2/3

History
- Opened: 8 February 2013 (preview); 11 February 2013
- Original company: Metrolink
Route map
Location

Edge Lane is a tram stop on the East Manchester Line (EML) of Greater Manchester's light-rail Metrolink system. It opened on 11 February 2013, after a three-day free trial for local residents. The station was constructed as part of Phase 3a of the Metrolink's expansion, and is located at the junction of Manchester Road and Edge Lane, just inside the border of Droylsden, Tameside, England.

== Services ==
Services are mostly every 12 minutes on all routes.

Preceding station	Manchester Metrolink	Following station
Clayton Hall towards Eccles	Eccles–Ashton (peak only)	Cemetery Road towards Ashton-under-Lyne
Clayton Hall towards Eccles	Eccles–Ashton via MediaCityUK (off-peak only)	Cemetery Road towards Ashton-under-Lyne

== Connecting bus routes ==
Edge Lane is directly served by Stagecoach Manchester bus services 216 and 231, which stops next to the station on Manchester Road, with the 216 replicating the tram route between Piccadilly Gardens and Ashton-under-Lyne, while the 231 runs between Manchester and Ashton via Littlemoss and Smallshaw.

Stagecoach/JPT services 217 and 218, which also stops on Manchester Road, run circular routes between Manchester and Mossley serving Droylsden, Dukinfield, Ashton, Tameside General Hospital and Stalybridge.
