= Cemetery Road tram stop =

Manchester Metrolink tram stop

Cemetery Road
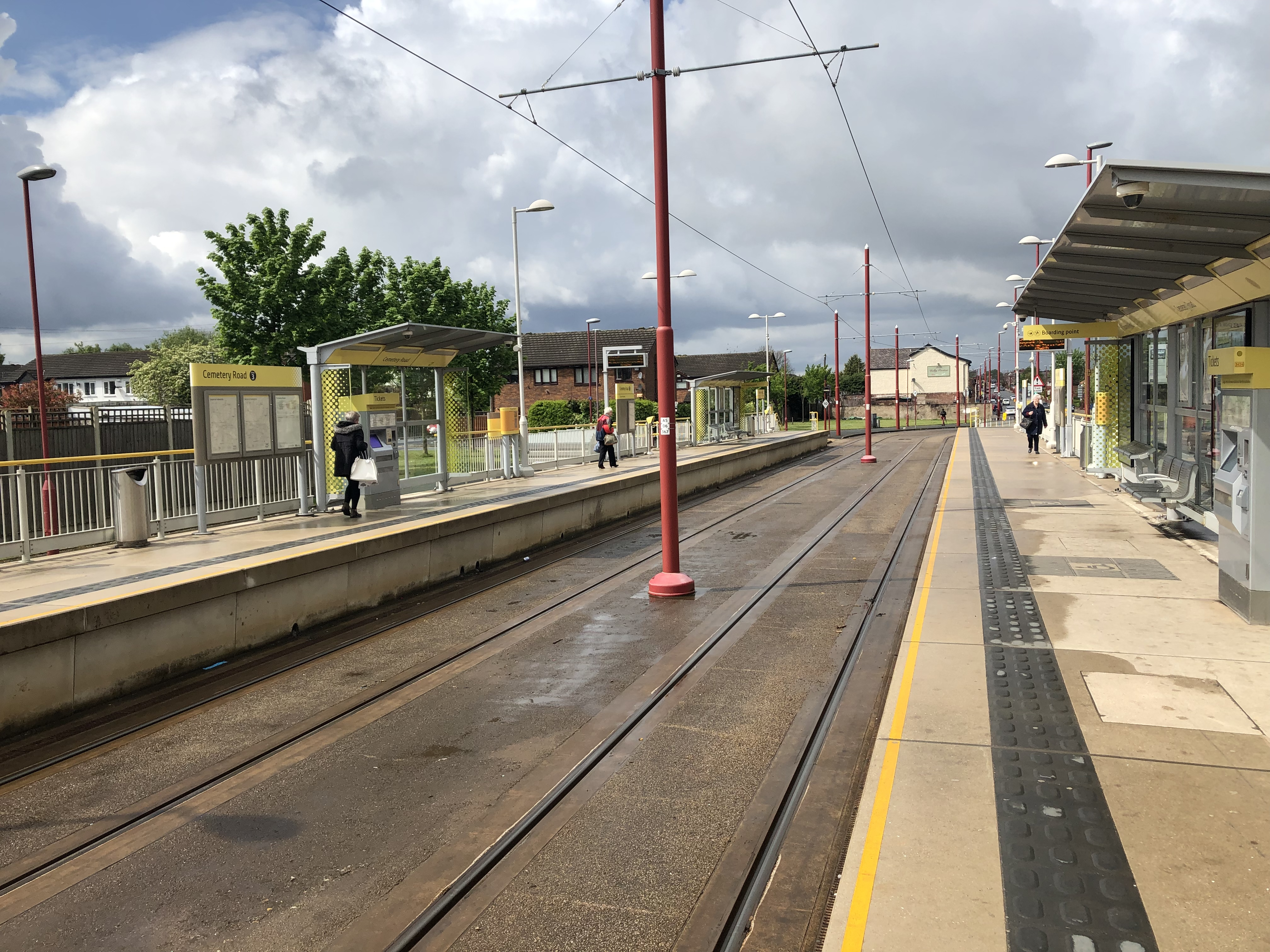
- Cemetery Road tram stop in May 2019.

General information
- Location: Droylsden, Tameside; England
- Coordinates: 53.47988°N 2.15491°W
- System: Metrolink station
- Line: East Manchester Line
- Platforms: 2

Other information
- Status: In operation
- Fare zone: 3

History
- Opened: 8 February 2013 (preview); 11 February 2013 (full)
- Original company: Metrolink
Route map
Location

Cemetery Road is a tram stop on the East Manchester Line (EML) of Greater Manchester's light-rail Metrolink system. It opened on 11 February 2013, after a three-day free trial for local residents. The station was constructed as part of Phase 3a of the Metrolink's expansion, and is located in Droylsden at the junction of Manchester Road and Cemetery Road, a part of Tameside, England.

== Services ==
Services run every 12 minutes on all routes.

Preceding station	Manchester Metrolink	Following station
Edge Lane towards Eccles	Eccles–Ashton (peak only)	Droylsden towards Ashton-under-Lyne
Edge Lane towards Eccles	Eccles–Ashton via MediaCityUK (off-peak only)	Droylsden towards Ashton-under-Lyne

== Connecting bus routes ==
Cemetery Road is directly served by Stagecoach Manchester bus service 216, which stops next to the station on Manchester Road and replicates the tram route between Piccadilly Gardens and Ashton-under-Lyne. Stagecoach/JPT services 217 and 218, which also stops on Manchester Road, run circular routes between Manchester and Mossley serving Droylsden, Dukinfield, Ashton, Tameside General Hospital and Stalybridge.
