= Velopark tram stop =

Manchester Metrolink tram stop

Velopark
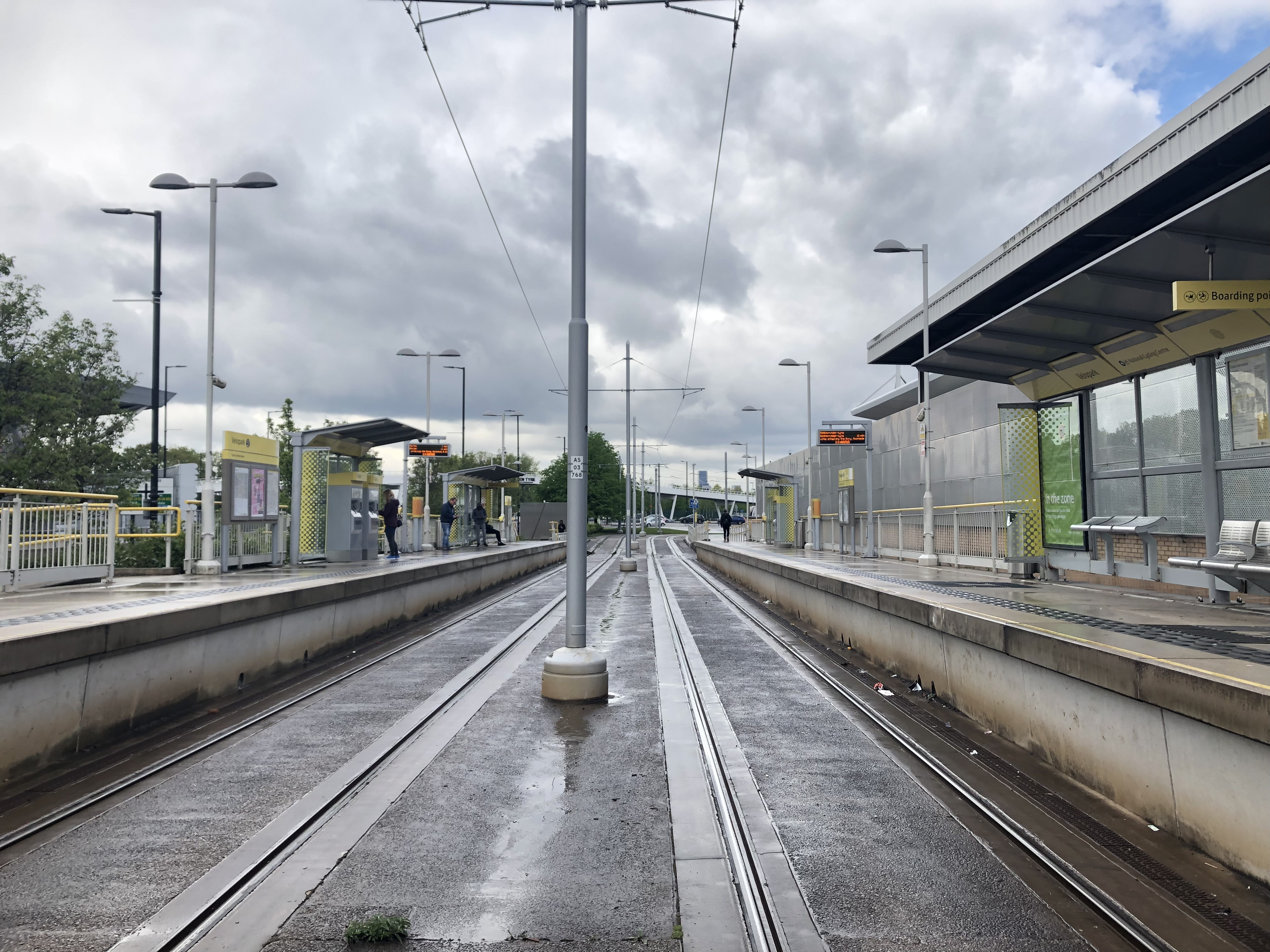
- Velopark tram stop in May 2019.

General information
- Location: Clayton, Manchester; England
- Coordinates: 53.48230°N 2.19301°W
- System: Metrolink station
- Line: East Manchester Line
- Platforms: 2

Other information
- Status: In operation
- Fare zone: 2

History
- Opened: 8 February 2013 (preview); 11 February 2013 (full)
- Original company: Metrolink
Route map
Location

Velopark is a tram stop on the East Manchester Line (EML) of Greater Manchester's light-rail Metrolink system. It opened on 11 February 2013, after a three-day free trial for local residents. The stop was constructed as part of Phase 3a of the Metrolink's expansion, and is located beside Manchester Velodrome, in Clayton, Manchester, England. During planning and construction phases, the stop was known as New East (for Velodrome) and as Sportcity-Velodrome.

== Services ==
Services run every twelve minutes on each route at most operating times.

Preceding station	Manchester Metrolink	Following station
Etihad Campus towards Eccles	Eccles–Ashton (peak only)	Clayton Hall towards Ashton-under-Lyne
Etihad Campus towards Eccles	Eccles–Ashton via MediaCityUK (off-peak only)	Clayton Hall towards Ashton-under-Lyne

== Connecting bus routes ==
Velopark is directly served by Stagecoach Manchester bus services 216 and 231, which stops next to the station on Ashton New Road, with the 216 replicating the tram route between Piccadilly Gardens and Droylsden before continuing to Ashton-under-Lyne, while the 231 runs between Manchester and Ashton via Littlemoss and Smallshaw. M Travel service 188 also stops on Ashton New Road and runs between Manchester and Ryder Brow via Openshaw and Gorton.

Stagecoach/JPT services 217 and 218, which stops on Ashton New Road and Alan Turing Way, run circular routes between Manchester and Mossley serving Droylsden, Dukinfield, Ashton, Tameside General Hospital and Stalybridge, while Go North West service 53 stops nearby on Alan Turing Way or Grey Mare Lane and runs between Cheetham Hill and Pendleton via Gorton, Rusholme and Old Trafford.

Preceding station	Manchester Metrolink	Following station
Etihad Campus towards Eccles	Eccles–Ashton (peak only)	Clayton Hall towards Ashton-under-Lyne
Etihad Campus towards MediaCityUK	MediaCityUK – Ashton-under-Lyne Line	Clayton Hall towards Ashton-under-Lyne
