= Droylsden tram stop =

Manchester Metrolink tram stop

Droylsden
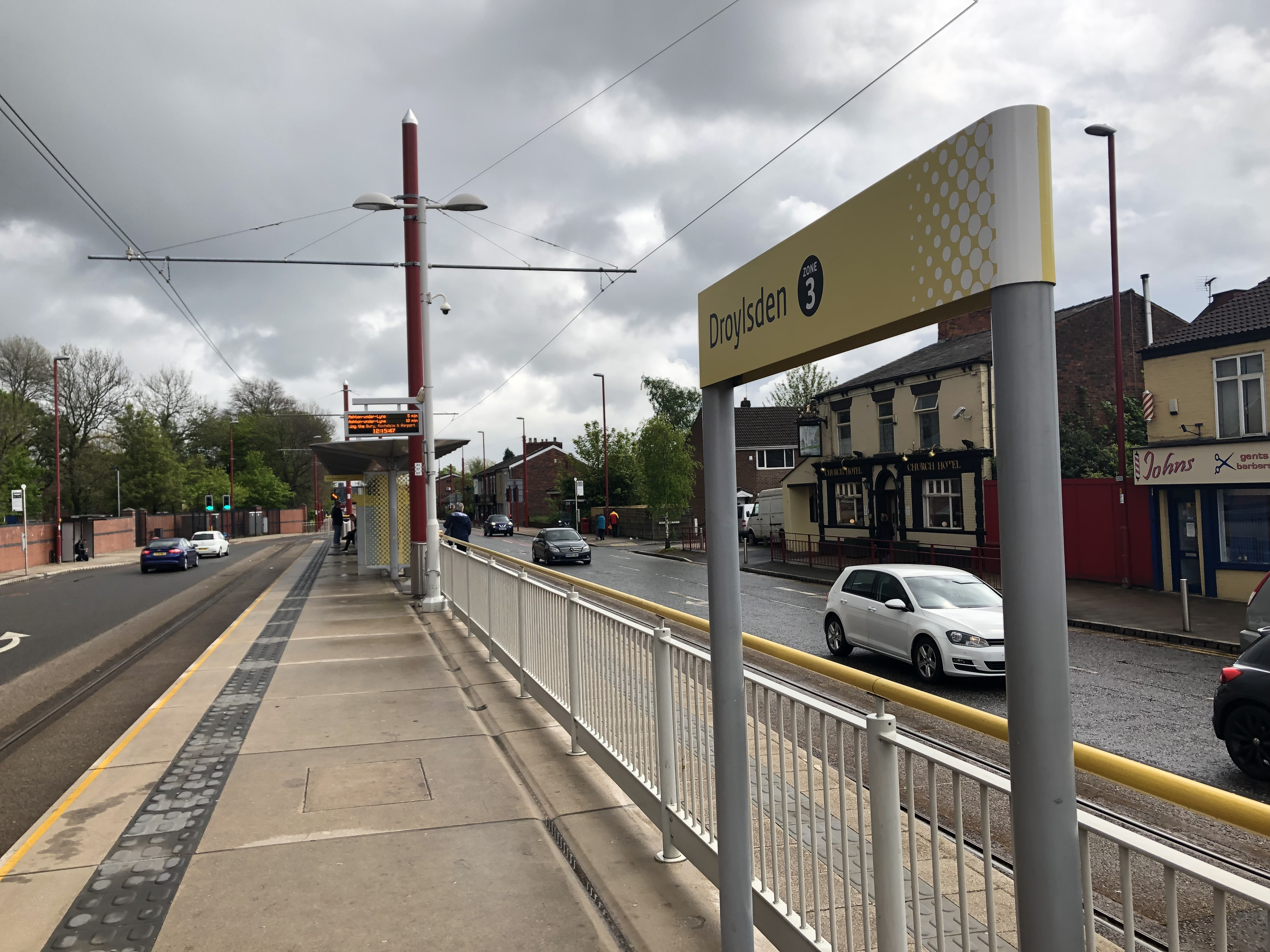
- Droylsden tram stop in May 2019

General information
- Location: Droylsden, Tameside; England
- Coordinates: 53.47950°N 2.14482°W
- System: Metrolink station
- Line: East Manchester Line
- Platforms: 2 (1 island)

Other information
- Status: In operation
- Fare zone: 3

History
- Opened: 9 February 2013 (preview); 11 February 2013 (full)
- Original company: Metrolink
Route map
Location

Droylsden is a tram stop on the East Manchester Line (EML) of Greater Manchester's light-rail Metrolink system. It opened on 11 February 2013, after a three-day free trial for local residents. The stop was constructed as part of Phase 3a of the Metrolink's expansion, and is located in Droylsden town centre, a part of Tameside, England.

== History ==
Before the stop opened, there was much controversy surrounding the development of the Metrolink line, with many Droylsden residents complaining about the disruption to traffic and local businesses. It is mainly due to these concerns that a three-day free trial service was run for local residents.

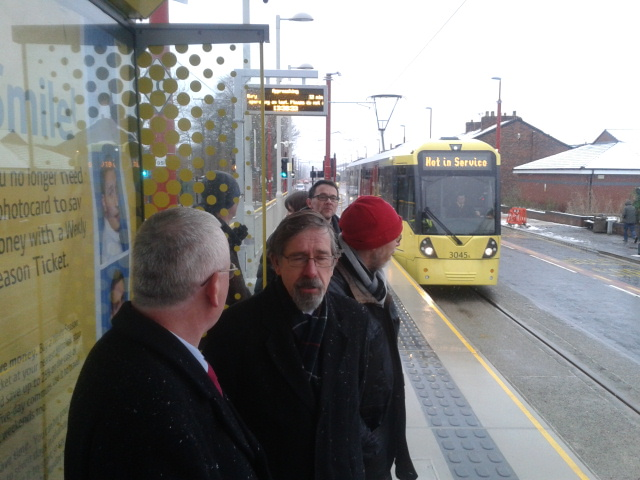
Droylsden Metrolink station shortly before opening

Droylsden Metrolink stop was the terminus of the East Manchester Line until 9 October 2013, when services were extended eastwards to Ashton-under-Lyne Metrolink station.

== Services ==
Services are mostly every 12 minutes on all routes.

Preceding station	Manchester Metrolink	Following station
Cemetery Road towards Eccles	Eccles–Ashton (peak only)	Audenshaw towards Ashton-under-Lyne
Cemetery Road towards Eccles	Eccles–Ashton via MediaCityUK (off-peak only)	Audenshaw towards Ashton-under-Lyne

== Connecting bus routes ==
Droylsden stop is directly served by a number of services, which stop on Ashton Road or Market Street.

On Ashton Road, Stagecoach Manchester bus service 216 replicates the tram route between Piccadilly Gardens and Droylsden before continuing to Ashton-under-Lyne. Stagecoach/JPT services 217 and 218, which also stops on Ashton Road, run circular routes between Manchester and Mossley serving Droylsden, Dukinfield, Ashton, Tameside General Hospital and Stalybridge.

On Market Street, Stagecoach service 7 (which also stops on Ashton Road), runs between Ashton and Stockport via Gorton and Reddish, while Stagecoach/First service 168 runs between Ashton and Chorlton via Levenshulme and Stagecoach/JPT service 169 runs between Ashton and Southern Cemetery via Levenshulme.
