= New Islington tram stop =

Manchester Metrolink tram stop

New Islington
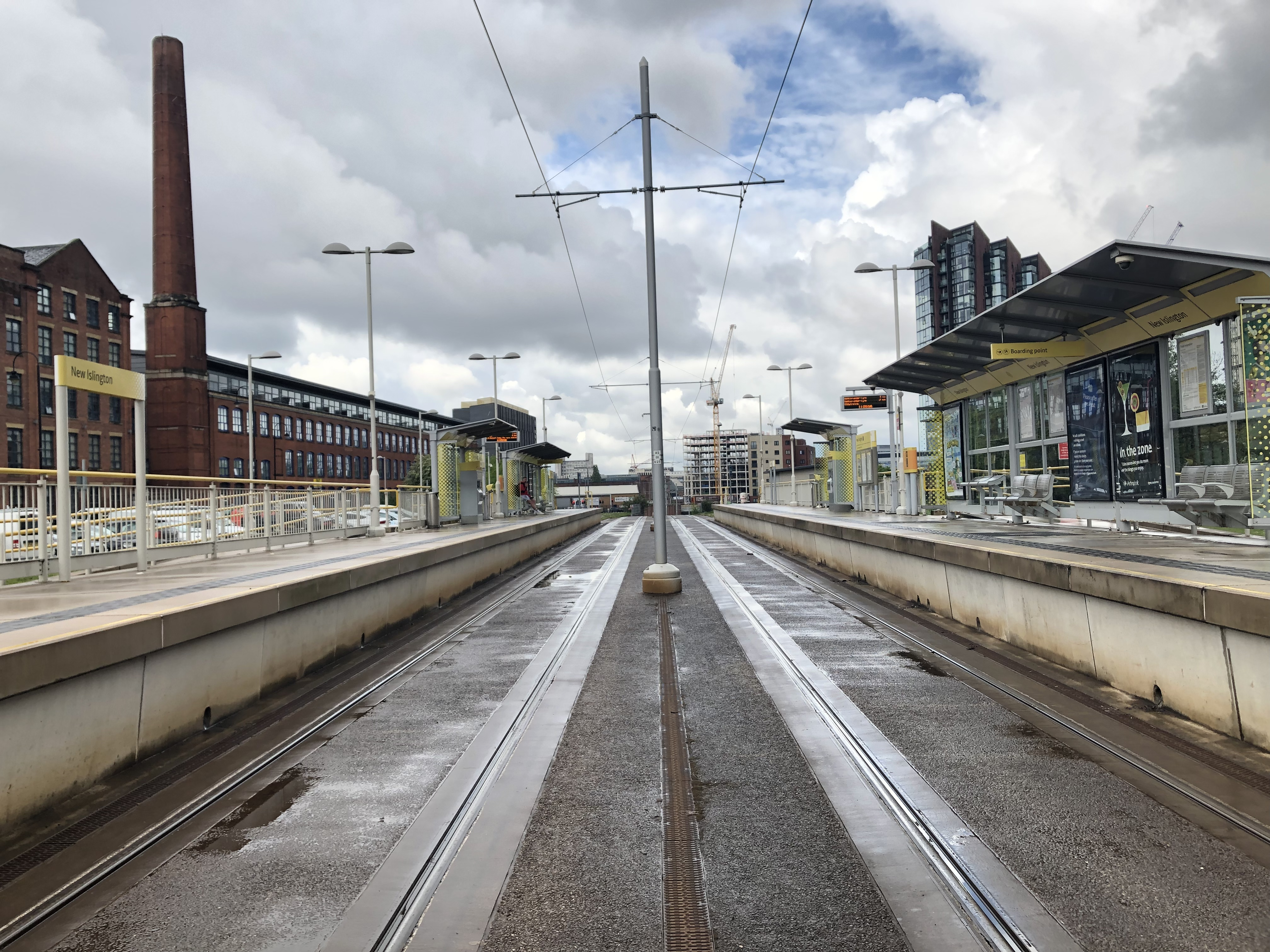
- New Islington tram stop, in May 2019.

General information
- Location: New Islington, Manchester; England
- Coordinates: 53.4810°N 2.2198°W
- System: Metrolink station
- Line: East Manchester Line
- Platforms: 2

Other information
- Status: In operation
- Fare zone: 1

History
- Opened: 8 February 2013 (preview); 11 February 2013 (full)
- Original company: Metrolink
Route map
Location

New Islington is a tram stop on the East Manchester Line (EML) and Zone 1 of Greater Manchester's light-rail Metrolink system. The station opened on 11 February 2013, after a three-day free trial for local residents. The station was constructed as part of Phase 3a of the Metrolink's expansion, and is located in the New Islington area of Manchester, England. It was originally proposed to open with the name Pollard Street, being located at the junction Munday Street and Pollard Street.

== Services ==
Services run every twelve minutes on each route at most operating times.

Preceding station	Manchester Metrolink	Following station
Piccadilly towards Eccles	Eccles–Ashton (peak only)	Holt Town towards Ashton-under-Lyne
Piccadilly towards Eccles	Eccles–Ashton via MediaCityUK (off-peak only)	Holt Town towards Ashton-under-Lyne
Piccadilly towards Altrincham	Altrincham–Etihad Campus (evenings and Sundays only)	Holt Town towards Etihad Campus

== Connecting bus routes ==
New Islington is directly served by a bus service, which is served by Stagecoach Manchester service 216, which replicates the Metrolink service to Droylsden before continuing to Ashton-under-Lyne, and Stagecoach service 231, which runs nearby to Ashton via Littlemoss and Smallshaw. Both services run to nearby Piccadilly Gardens in Manchester.
