= Clayton Hall tram stop =

Metrolink tram stop in Manchester, England

Clayton Hall
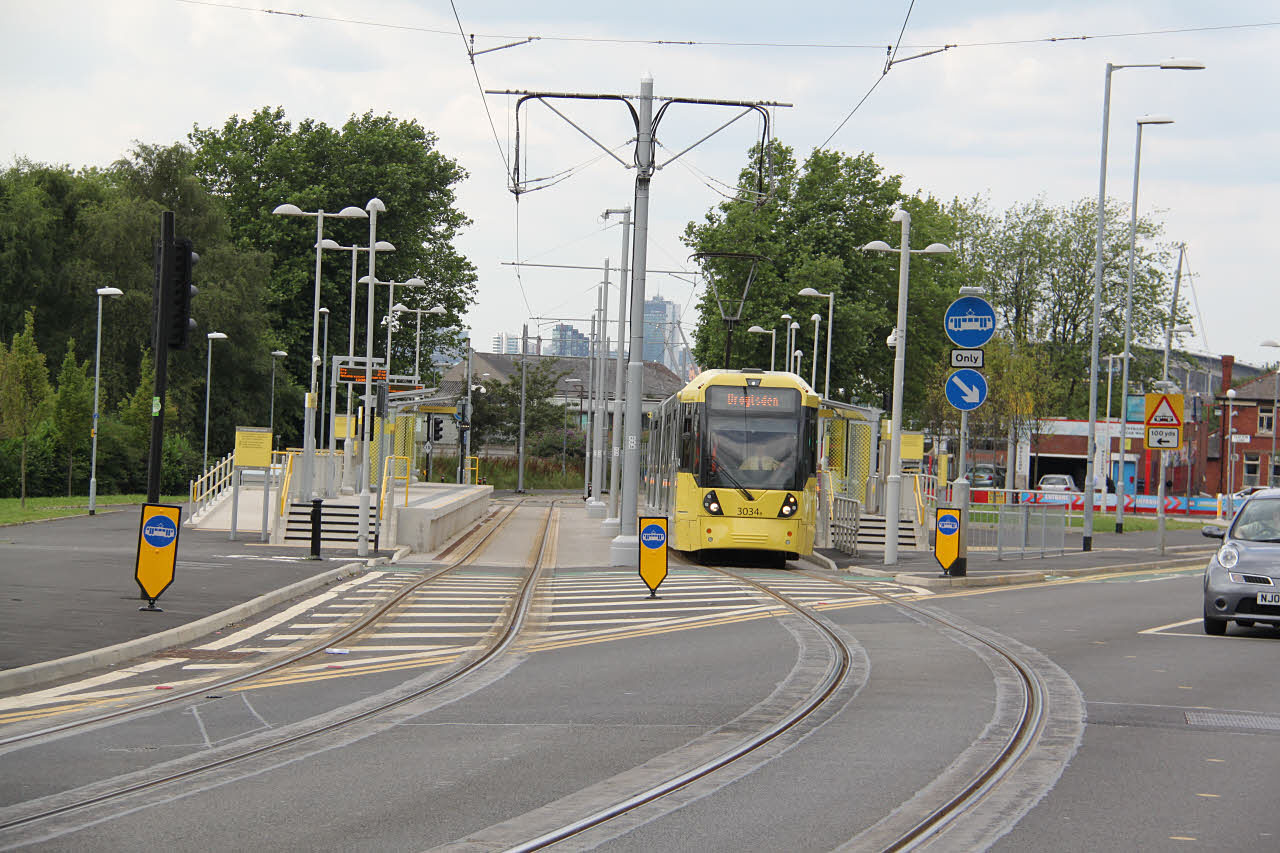
- Clayton Hall tram stop in 2013.

General information
- Location: Clayton, Manchester; England
- Coordinates: 53.48280°N 2.18233°W
- System: Metrolink station
- Line: East Manchester Line
- Platforms: 2

Other information
- Status: In operation
- Fare zone: 2

History
- Opened: 8 February 2013 (preview); 11 February 2013 (full)
- Original company: Metrolink
Route map
Location

Clayton Hall in the Clayton area of Manchester, England, is a tram stop on the East Manchester Line (EML) of Transport for Greater Manchester's light-rail Metrolink system. The station opened on 11 February 2013, after a three-day free trial for local residents. The station was constructed as part of Phase 3a of the Metrolink's expansion.

== Services ==
Services run every twelve minutes on each route at most operating times.

Preceding station	Manchester Metrolink	Following station
Velopark towards Eccles	Eccles–Ashton (peak only)	Edge Lane towards Ashton-under-Lyne
Velopark towards Eccles	Eccles–Ashton via MediaCityUK (off-peak only)	Edge Lane towards Ashton-under-Lyne

== Connecting bus routes ==
Clayton Hall is served by buses stopping nearby on Ashton New Road. Stagecoach Manchester services 216 and 231 both run between Manchester and Ashton with the 216 replicating the tram route to Droylsden before continuing via Audenshaw, while the 231 runs via Littlemoss and Smallshaw. The 231 is also operated by First Greater Manchester during the evening. Stagecoach's 171 service runs between Newton Heath and East Didsbury via Openshaw, Gorton and Levenshulme, while M Travel's 188 service also runs via Openshaw and Gorton on its route between Manchester and Ryder Brow.
