= Holt Town tram stop =

Manchester Metrolink tram stop

Holt Town
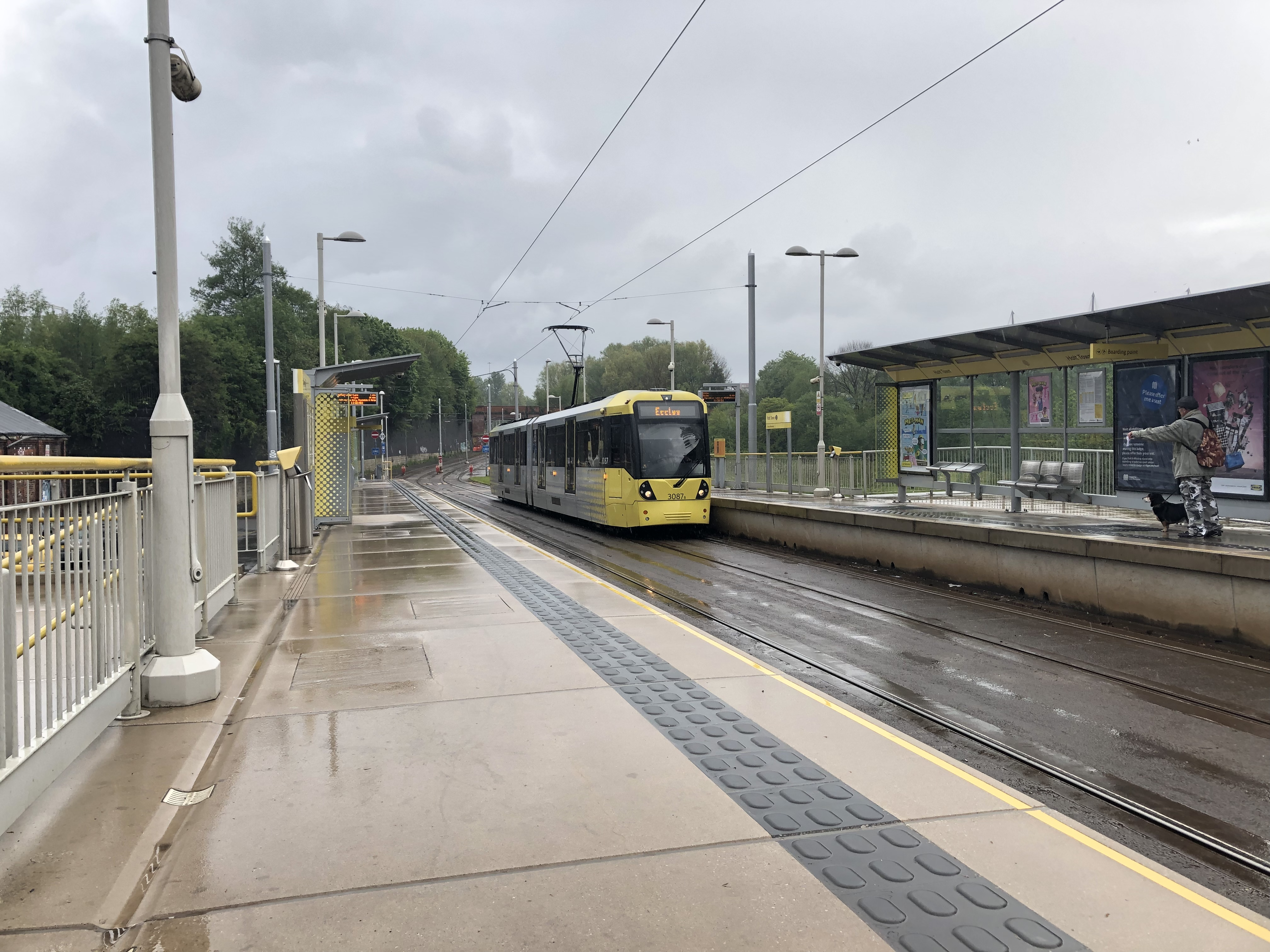
- Holt Town tram stop in May 2019.

General information
- Location: Holt Town, Manchester; England
- Coordinates: 53.48329°N 2.21205°W
- System: Metrolink station
- Line: East Manchester Line
- Platforms: 2

Other information
- Status: In operation
- Fare zone: 2

History
- Opened: 8 February 2013 (preview); 11 February 2013(full)
- Original company: Metrolink
Route map
Location

Holt Town is a tram stop on the East Manchester Line (EML) of Greater Manchester's light-rail Metrolink system. The station opened on 11 February 2013, after a three-day free trial for local residents, as part of Phase 3a of the Metrolink's expansion. It is beside the River Medlock in Holt Town, between Ancoats and Bradford.

== Services ==
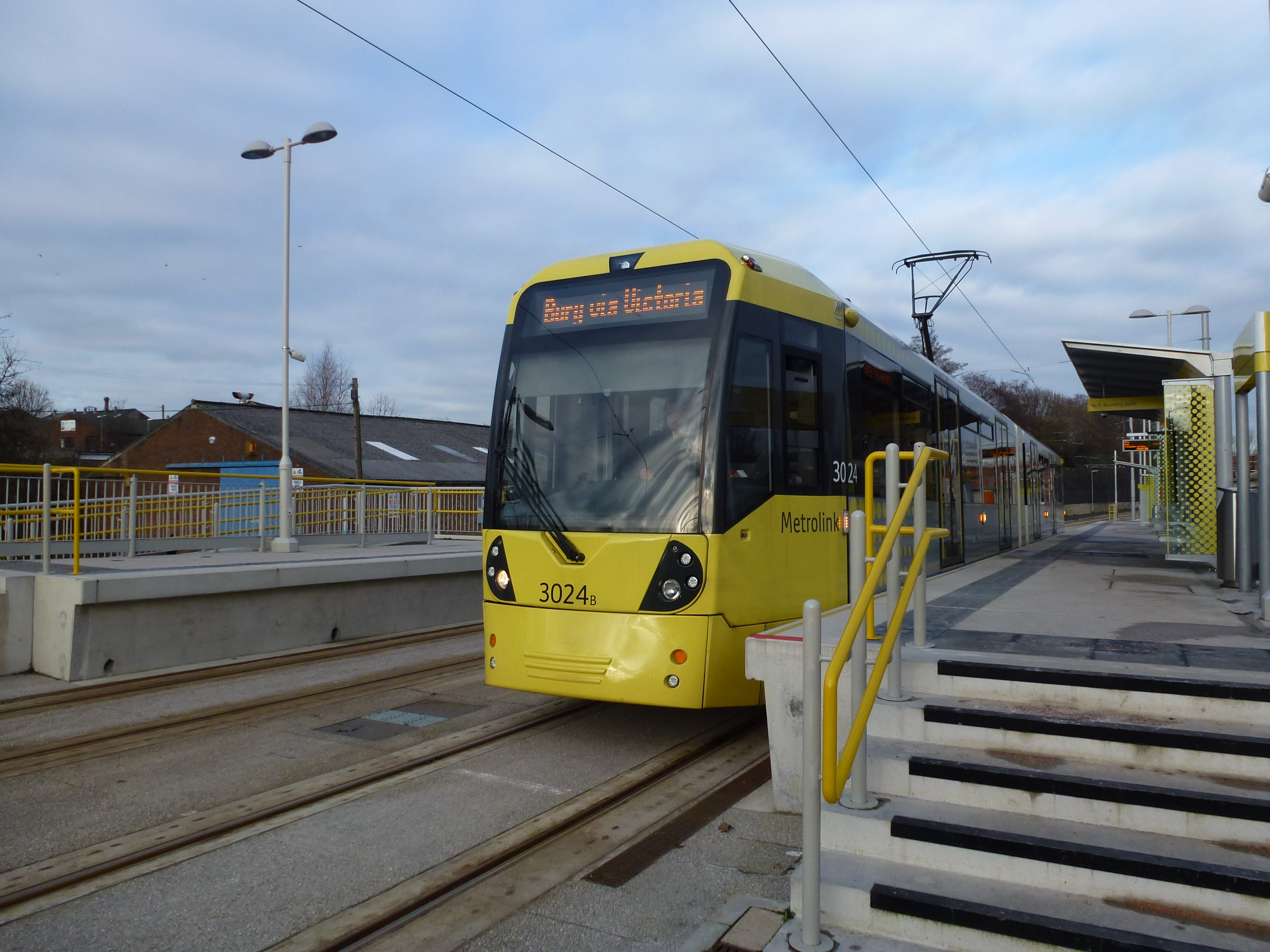
Holt Town tram stop, in February 2013

Services run every 12 minutes on each route.

Preceding station	Manchester Metrolink	Following station
New Islington towards Eccles	Eccles–Ashton (peak only)	Etihad Campus towards Ashton-under-Lyne
New Islington towards Eccles	Eccles–Ashton via MediaCityUK (off-peak only)	Etihad Campus towards Ashton-under-Lyne
New Islington towards Altrincham	Altrincham–Etihad Campus (evenings and Sundays only)	Etihad Campus Terminus

== Connecting bus routes ==
Holt Town is served by Bee Network services 216 and 231, which both stop nearby on Ashton New Road. Service 216 replicates the tram route between Piccadilly Gardens and Droylsden before continuing to Ashton-under-Lyne, while the 231 runs from Manchester to Ashton via Littlemoss and Smallshaw.
