= Ashton Moss tram stop =

Manchester Metrolink tram stop

Ashton Moss
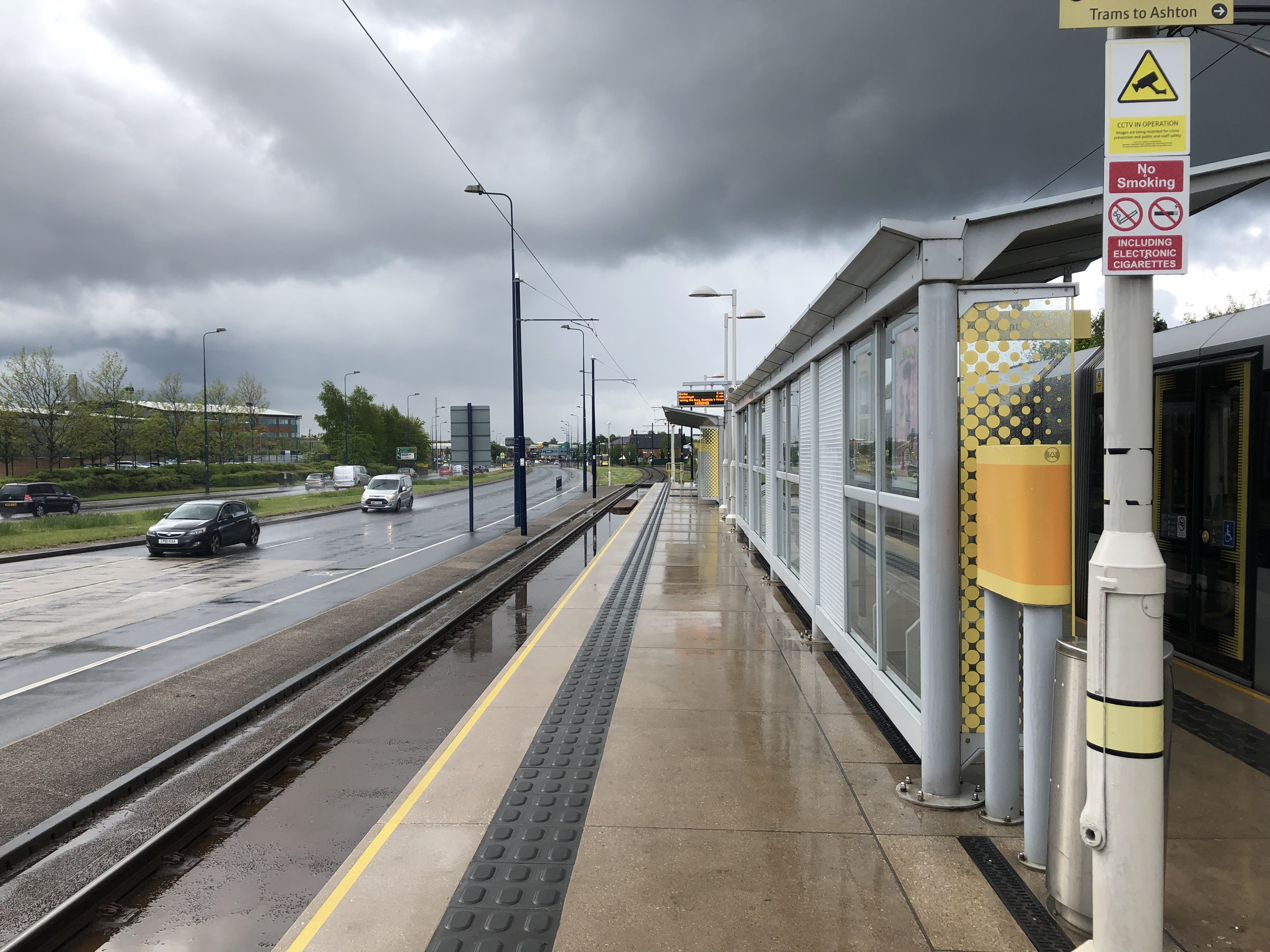
- Ashton Moss stop in May 2019.

General information
- Location: Ashton-under-Lyne, Metropolitan Borough of Tameside; England
- Coordinates: 53.48367°N 2.12191°W
- System: Metrolink station
- Line: East Manchester Line
- Platforms: 2 (1 island)

Other information
- Status: In operation
- Fare zone: 3

History
- Opened: 9 October 2013
- Original company: Manchester Metrolink
Route map
Location

Ashton Moss is a tram stop on the Manchester Metrolink's East Manchester Line, and opened on 9 October 2013 as part of Phase 3b of the network's expansion. This is one of the least used stops on the Metrolink network.

The stop is located on Lord Sheldon Way near the Ashton Moss leisure complex and Snipe Retail Park on Ashton New Road. Ashton Moss tram stop is served by a Park + Ride car park, with electric vehicle parking facilities.

A short lived railway station with the same name existed in the area, and was open from 1861 to 1862.

== History ==
Ashton Moss railway station opened on 26 August 1861 with only two services per day in each direction (one on Sundays) and served a small area to the south-west of Ashton-under-Lyne town centre. It closed on 1 June 1862, and reasons for closure are unknown.

The tram stop opened around 500 metres west of the former rail station on 9 October 2013 ahead of the originally-publicised schedule of winter 2013–14 adjacent to Lord Sheldon Way, one of the main roads running into Ashton town centre.

On 10 December 2021, a teenage boy was injured after being hit by a tram near the stop.

== Layout ==
Ashton Moss tram stop consists of two platforms (island platform). There are two canopies on opposite ends of the stop, each with six seats and three perch seats underneath. Also underneath each one (near to the centre of the platform) is a ticket machine. Passenger help points are located on either end of the platforms.

At the centre, two dot matrix passenger information displays stand serving one side of the platform each, and show estimated arrival times for trams in minutes up to 30 minutes prior (up to three at a time) and number of carriages.

There are two ramps at each end of the platforms, providing step-free access for passengers.

There is a 200-space Park + Ride car park to the north of the stop.

== Services ==
Services run every 12 minutes on all routes.

From this stop, services run to Ashton town centre in one direction and to Manchester city centre and Eccles in the other. Services to Eccles operate via MediaCityUK outside of peak times.

| Preceding station | Manchester Metrolink | Following station |
|---|---|---|
| Audenshaw towards Eccles | Eccles–Ashton (peak only) | Ashton West towards Ashton-under-Lyne |
| Audenshaw towards Eccles | Eccles–Ashton via MediaCityUK (off-peak only) | Ashton West towards Ashton-under-Lyne |

== Connecting transport ==
=== Bus ===
Ashton Moss tram stop is served directly by bus route 7 (Ashton-under-Lyne–Stockport) and 216 (Ashton-under-Lyne–Piccadilly Gardens) further away along Manchester Road/A635.

=== Train ===
This tram stop is not connected to any railway stations, but the nearest one is Guide Bridge, just under a mile away.

== Accidents and incidents ==
- 10 December 2021: A teenage boy was hit by a tram at around 17:00 GMT near the stop.

== See also ==
- Ashton Moss railway station
- Ashton-under-Lyne
