= Holt Town, Manchester =

Area of Manchester, England

Coordinates: 53.4829°N 2.2127°W

Holt Town is an inner-city area of east Manchester, England, in a loop of the River Medlock between Miles Platting to the north and west, Bradford to the east, and Ancoats to the south.

Holt Town was established in 1785 by David Holt, and is the only known example of a factory colony in Manchester, that is an isolated mill complex with housing for the workers.

Holt Town tram stop is on the East Manchester Line of the Manchester Metrolink light-rail system.

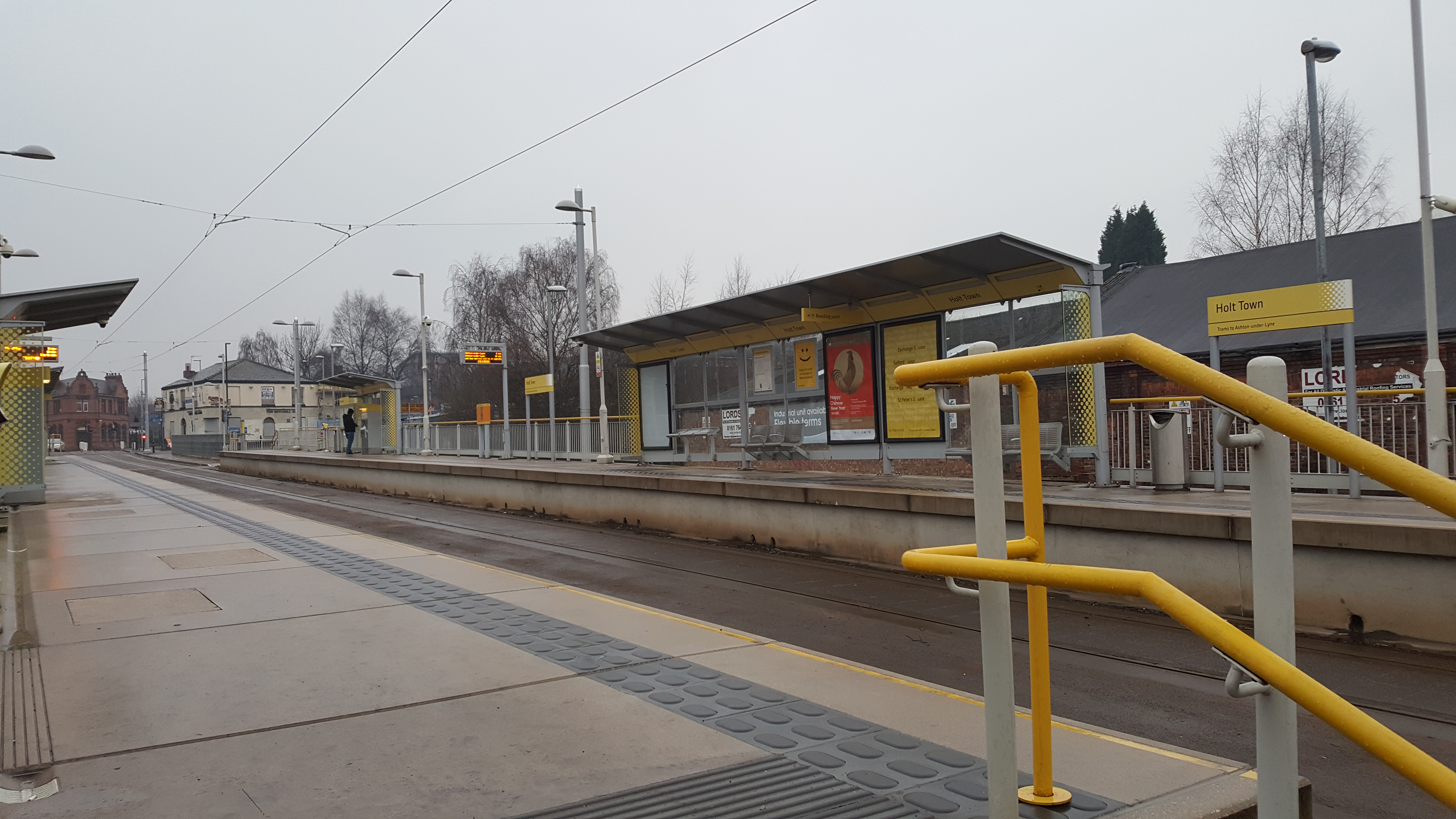
Holt Town Metrolink stop
