= Audenshaw tram stop =

Manchester Metrolink tram stop

Audenshaw
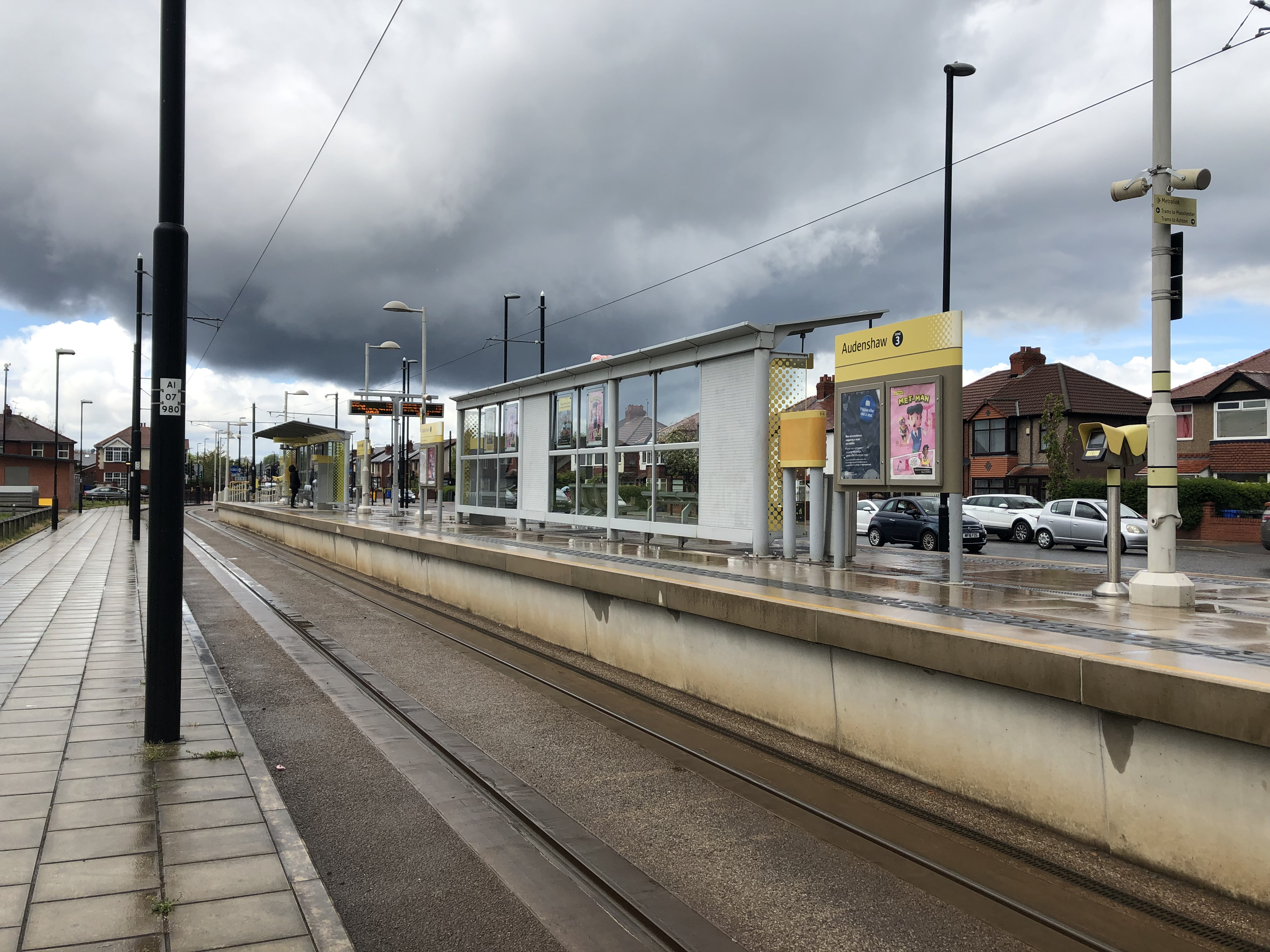
- Audenshaw tram stop in May 2019.

General information
- Location: Audenshaw, Tameside; England
- Coordinates: 53.47822°N 2.13096°W
- System: Metrolink station
- Line: East Manchester Line
- Platforms: 2 (1 island)

Other information
- Status: In operation
- Fare zone: 3

History
- Opened: 9 October 2013
- Original company: Metrolink
Route map
Location

Audenshaw is a tram stop serving Audenshaw on the East Manchester Line (EML) of Greater Manchester's light-rail Metrolink system. The station opened on 9 October 2013 as part of Phase 3b of the system's expansion, ahead of the originally-publicised schedule of the winter of 2013–14. It is located on Droylsden Road at the junctions of Lumb Lane and Manchester Road.

== Services ==
Services are mostly every twelve minutes on all routes.

Preceding station	Manchester Metrolink	Following station
Droylsden towards Eccles	Eccles–Ashton (peak only)	Ashton Moss towards Ashton-under-Lyne
Droylsden towards Eccles	Eccles–Ashton via MediaCityUK (off-peak only)	Ashton Moss towards Ashton-under-Lyne
