= Ashton West tram stop =

Manchester Metrolink tram stop

Ashton West
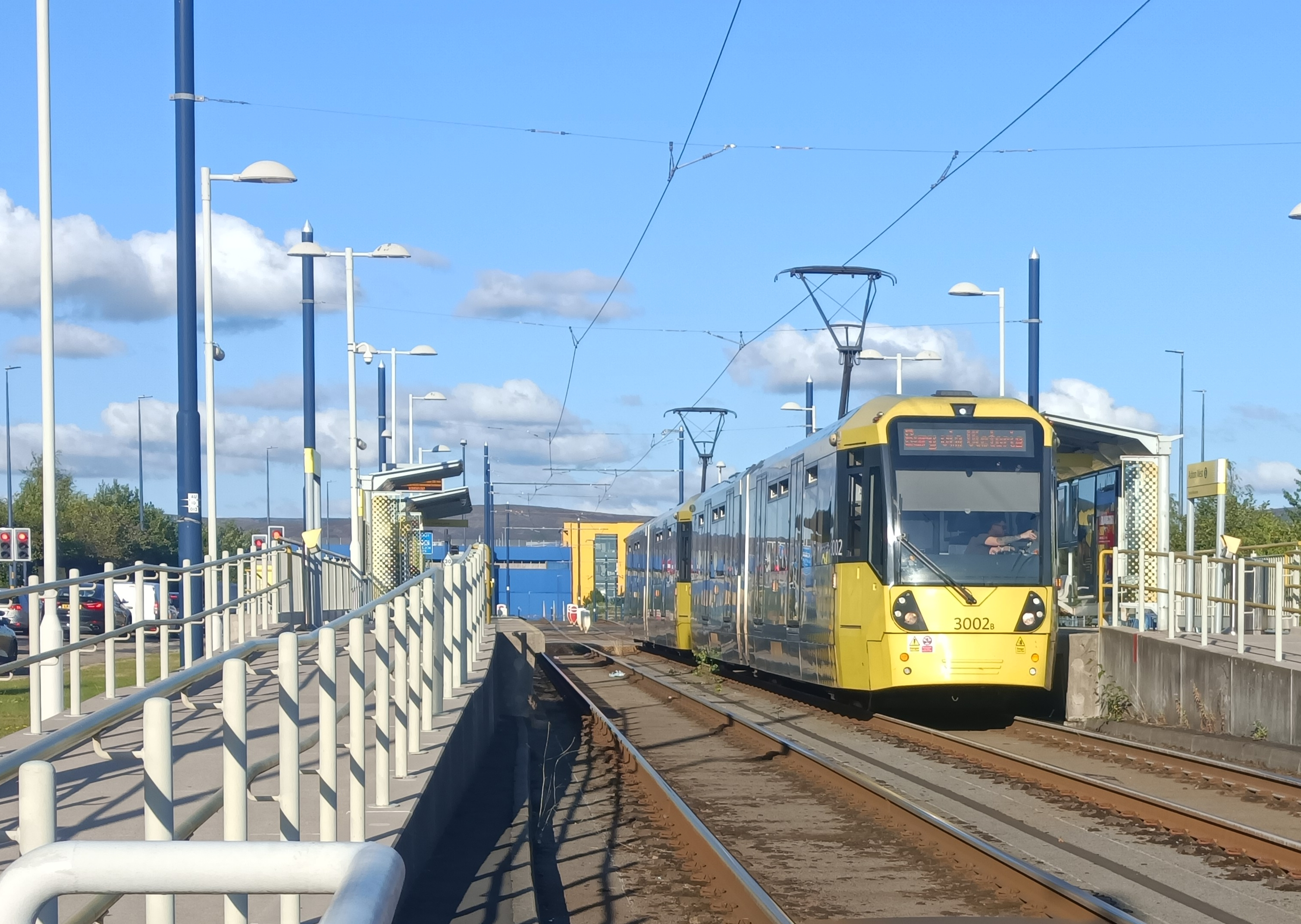
- Ashton West tram stop in 2026.

General information
- Location: Ashton-under-Lyne, Tameside; England
- Coordinates: 53.49026°N 2.10972°W
- Grid reference: SJ928993
- System: Metrolink station
- Line: East Manchester Line
- Platforms: 2

Other information
- Status: In operation
- Fare zone: 3

History
- Opened: 9 October 2013
- Original company: Metrolink
Route map
Location

Ashton West is a tram stop on the East Manchester Line (EML) of Greater Manchester's light-rail Metrolink system. It was built as part of Phase 3b of the Metrolink's expansion, and is located on Lord Sheldon Way near the Ashton Moss leisure complex, in western Ashton-under-Lyne, Tameside, England. The stop opened on 9 October 2013, ahead of the originally-publicised schedule of the winter of 2013–14. The stop primarily serves the aforementioned leisure and retail complex, and is also the closest to the Tameside Stadium, home of Curzon Ashton F.C.

The stop is one of the least used on the Metrolink network.

== Services ==
Services are every 12 minutes on all routes.

Preceding station	Manchester Metrolink	Following station
Ashton Moss towards Eccles	Eccles–Ashton (peak only)	Ashton-under-Lyne Terminus
Ashton Moss towards Eccles	Eccles–Ashton via MediaCityUK (off-peak only)	Ashton-under-Lyne Terminus

== Gallery ==
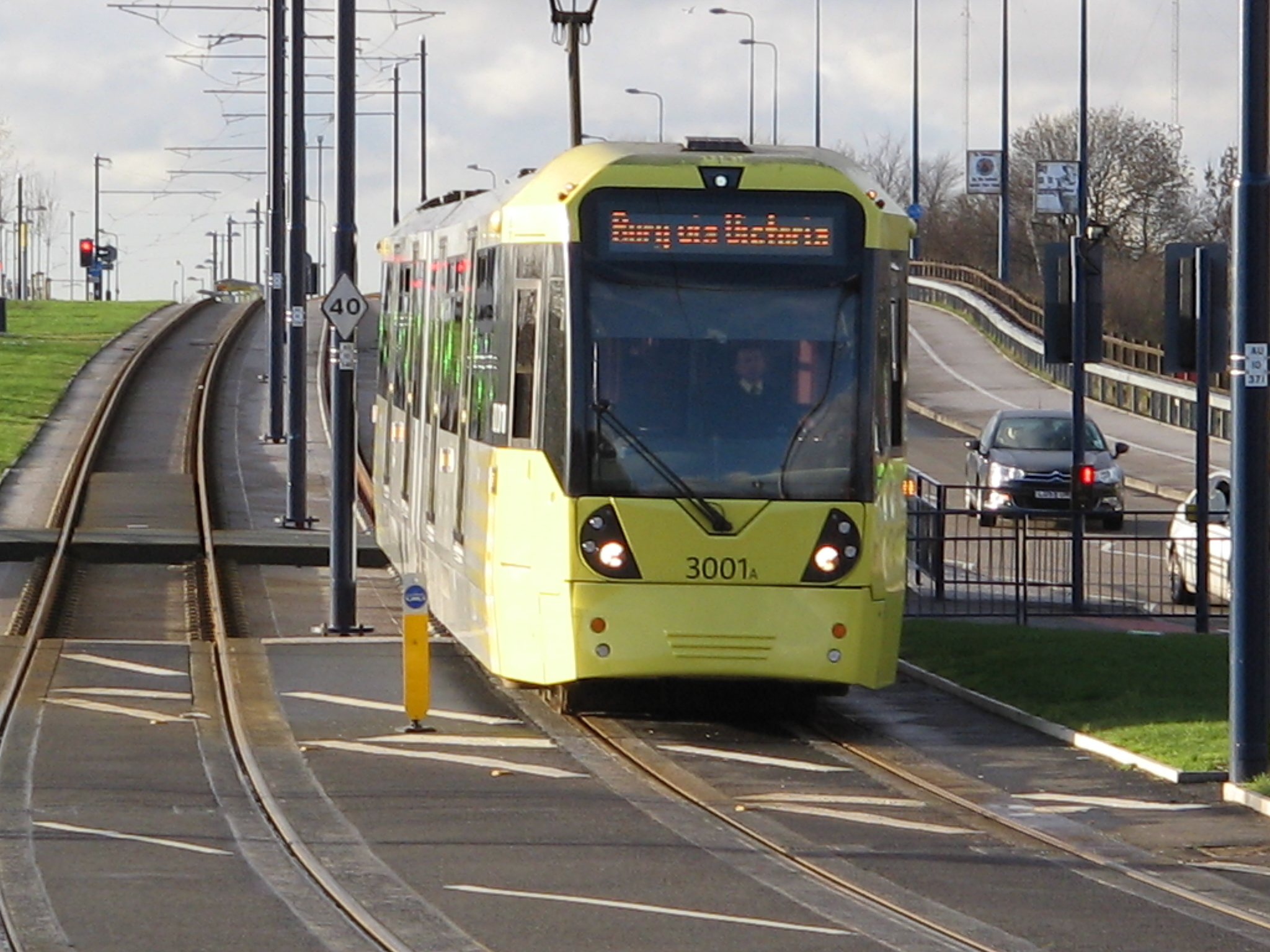
A M5000 tram having just left Ashton West

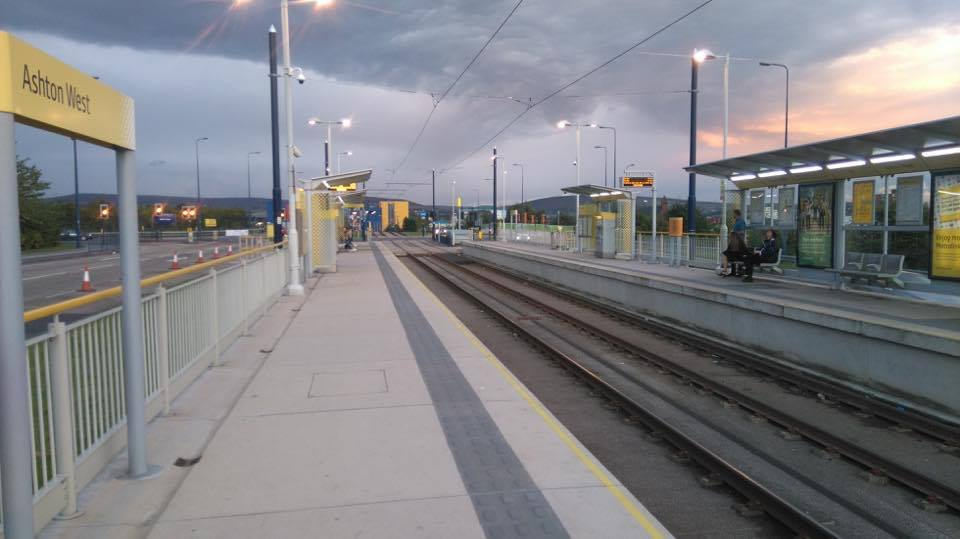
Ashton West tram station at twilight, in the direction of Ashton-under-Lyne in October 2016.

Preceding station	Manchester Metrolink	Following station
Ashton Moss towards Eccles	Eccles–Ashton (peak only)	Ashton-under-Lyne Terminus
Ashton Moss towards MediaCityUK	MediaCityUK – Ashton-under-Lyne Line	Ashton-under-Lyne Terminus
