= East Manchester Line =

Manchester Metrolink line

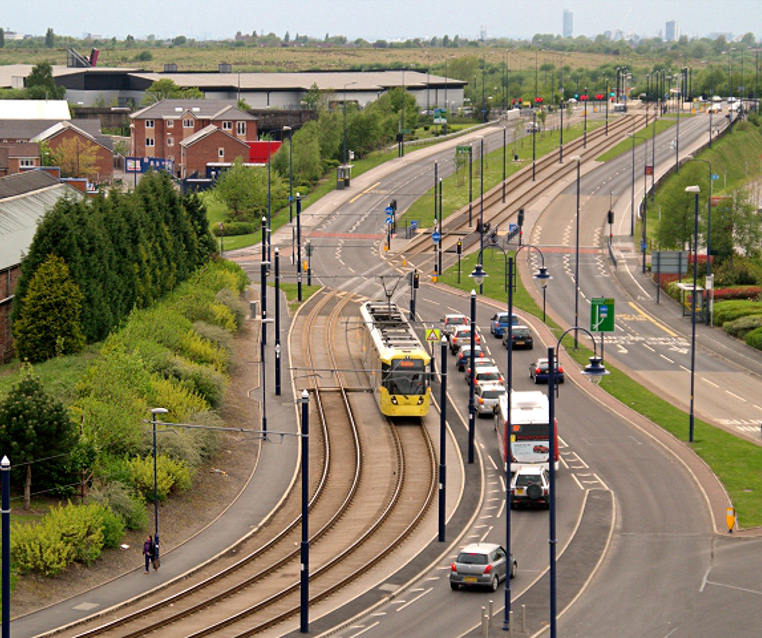
- A M5000 tram between Ashton West and Ashton-under-Lyne, running along Lord Sheldon Way.

Overview
- Locale: Manchester; Etihad Campus; Droylsden; Ashton-Under-Lyne
- Termini: Manchester Piccadilly; Ashton-under-Lyne
- Stations: 13

Service
- Type: Tram/Light rail
- System: Manchester Metrolink
- Rolling stock: M5000

History
- Opened: 11 February 2013 (Piccadilly to Droylsden); 9 October 2013 (Droylsden to Ashton)

Technical
- Line length: 6 miles (10 km)
- Character: Reserved track and street running
- Track gauge: 1,435 mm (4 ft 8 1/2 in) standard gauge
- Electrification: 750 volts DC overhead
- Operating speed: 40 mph (65km/h)

The East Manchester Line (EML) is a tram line of the Manchester Metrolink in Greater Manchester, England, running from Manchester to Ashton-under-Lyne via Droylsden and Audenshaw. The line opened in 2013 as part of phase three of the system's expansion.

== Route ==
The East Manchester Line runs on a mixture of reserved tracks and on-street sections with other traffic. Between Piccadilly and Clayton Hall stop, the line runs mostly along a reserved trackbed, it then runs on-street from Clayton Hall to Audenshaw, before running on a reserved route to Ashton.

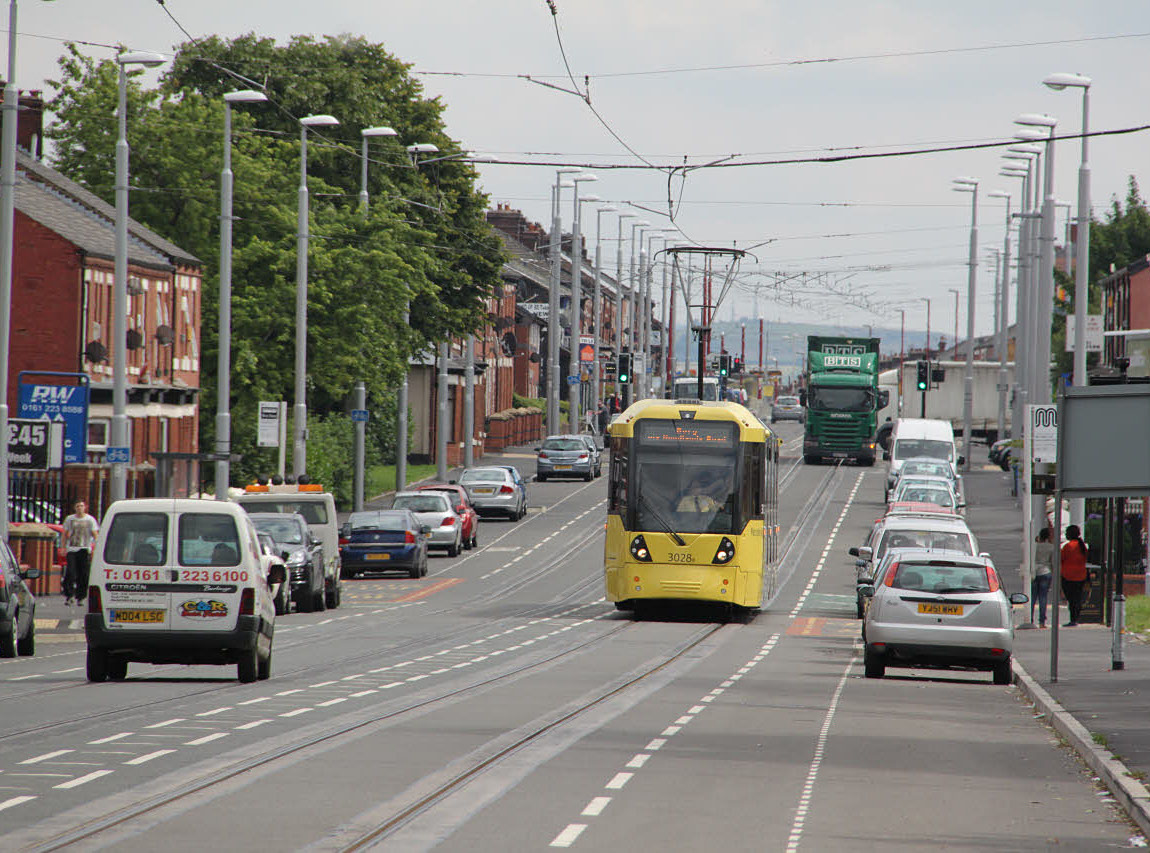
A tram street running on Ashton New Road, between Clayton Hall and Edge Lane stops.

From Piccadilly station, the line runs east, emerging from the station's undercroft, passing the reversing sidings, where trams terminating at Piccadilly reverse. Between Piccadilly and the first stop New Islington, the line runs on a reserved trackbed, running under a purpose built underpass under Great Ancoats Street. After New Islington, the line merges onto Merrill Street with other traffic for 250 metres, then diverges left to get to Holt Town stop which is also off street. The line then runs along a reserved track along the valley of the River Medlock before serving two sporting venues; Etihad Campus stop alongside City of Manchester Stadium, the home of Manchester City FC, and then, after running through a short tunnel under Alan Turing Way; Velopark stop, which serves the Manchester Velodrome.

The line then runs along Ashton New Road for 250 metres before crossing it, and after a short reserved track section, it serves Clayton Hall stop, before merging onto Ashton New Road, which it shares with other traffic for the next few miles, serving stops at Edge Lane, Cemetery Road, Droylsden and Audenshaw.

After this the line crosses onto a reserved track section, which runs alongside Lord Sheldon Way – the Ashton Northern Bypass for the run into Ashton – serving Ashton Moss stop. It then crosses part of Lord Sheldon Way to get to the central reservation section, running up to Ashton West stop. It then runs into Ashton town centre on a reserved track alongside the road, crossing several roads before reaching the terminus at Ashton-under-Lyne stop, which is located next to Ashton-under-Lyne bus station, and a short walk from Ashton-under-Lyne railway station.

=== Route map ===
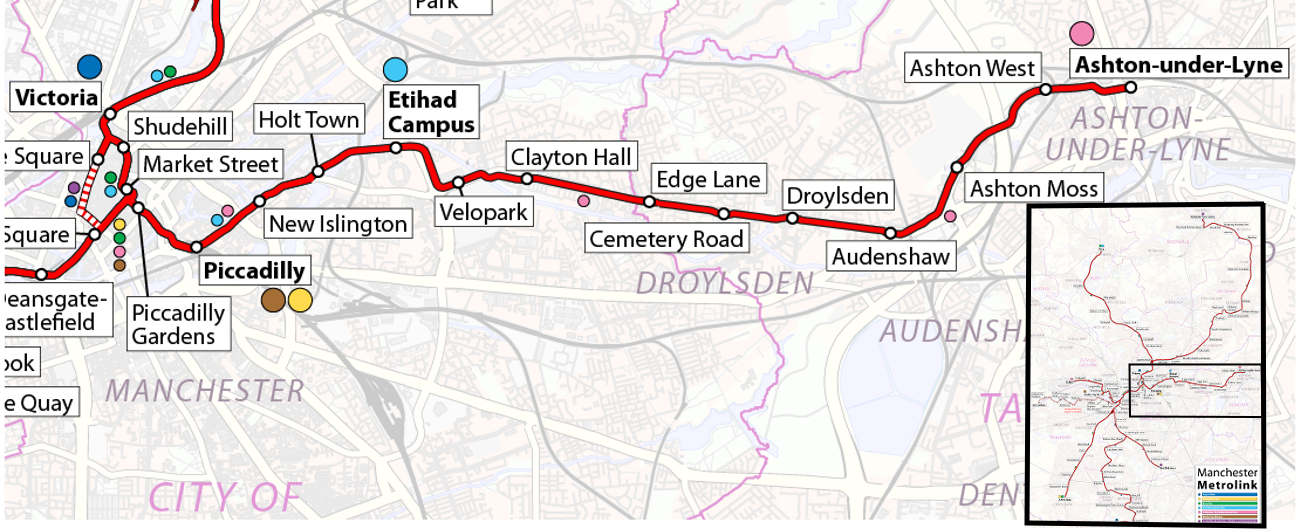

== History ==
The route was constructed as part of the third phase of the Metrolink expansion, which included new lines to Ashton, East Didsbury, Manchester Airport and Oldham and Rochdale.

The line was opened in two parts; during Phase 3a, the 3.9 mile (6.3 km) section from Piccadilly to Droylsden was opened for a three-day free trial for local residents on 8 February 2013, it then opened to the general public on 11 February 2013.

During Phase 3b, the 2.1 miles (3.4 km) from Droylsden to Ashton-under-Lyne, was opened on 9 October 2013.

== Proposed future development ==
=== Stalybridge extension ===
Tameside Metropolitan Borough Council have stated their aspiration for the East Manchester Line to be extended from Ashton-under-Lyne to Stalybridge. In 2019 the Greater Manchester Combined Authority confirmed that the Stalybridge extension was being considered as part of their transport strategy through to 2040.

== Services ==
As of January 2019:

- During all operating hours a service from Ashton-under-Lyne runs at 12-minute intervals to Eccles via Manchester city centre. This service additionally stops at MediaCityUK during early mornings, evenings, and Sundays.

In Early 2024, TfGM extended the off-peak Altrincham - Piccadilly Service to terminate at Etihad Campus instead, providing extra services the nearby Co-op Live Arena.
