= Etihad Campus tram stop =

Manchester Metrolink tram stop

Etihad Campus
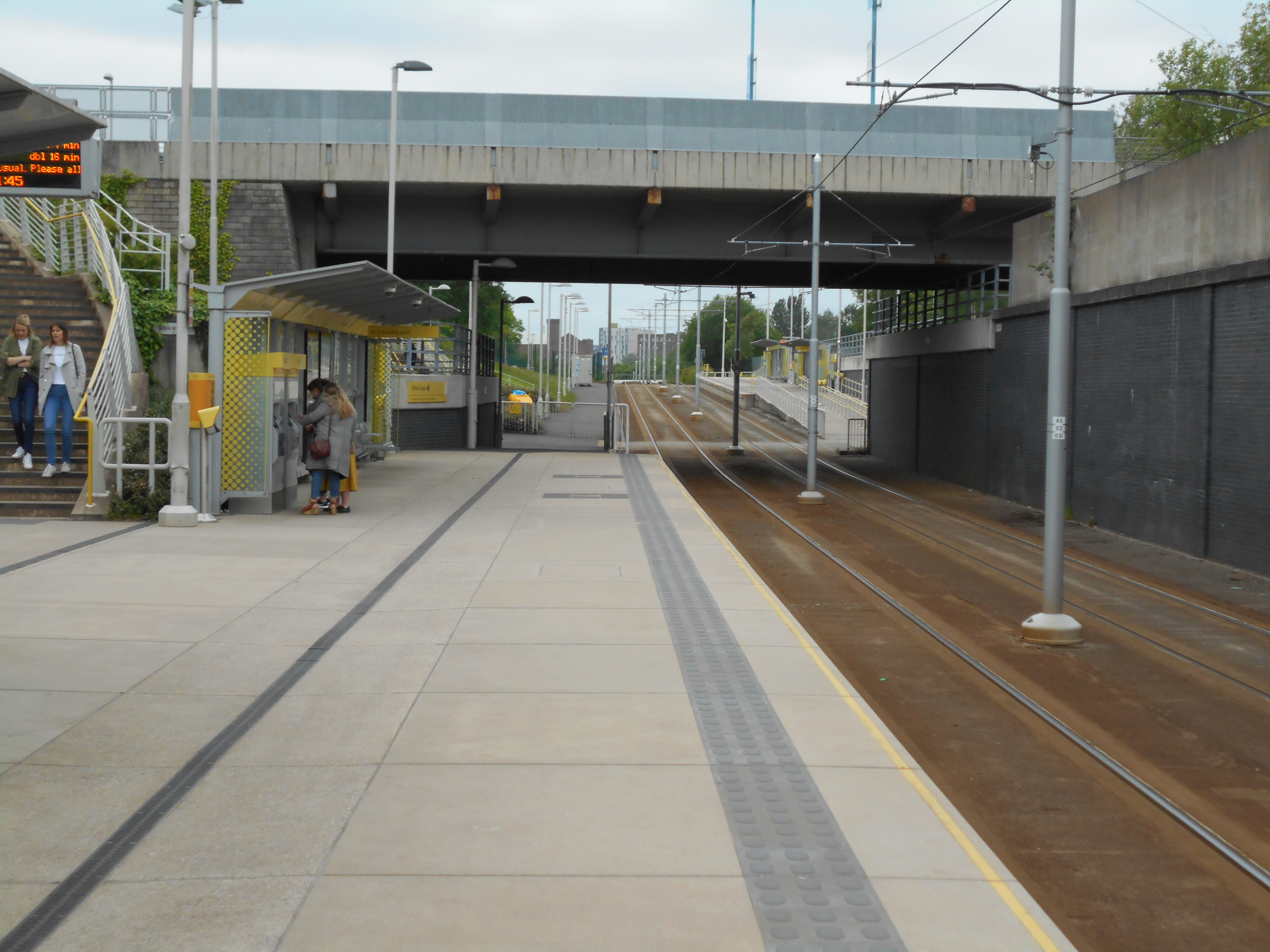
- The stop in May 2019.

General information
- Location: Etihad Campus/Sportcity, Manchester; England
- Coordinates: 53.48537°N 2.20134°W
- System: Metrolink station
- Line: East Manchester Line
- Platforms: 2

Other information
- Status: In operation
- Fare zone: 2

History
- Opened: 8 February 2013 (preview); 11 February 2013 (full)
- Original company: Metrolink
Route map
Location

Etihad Campus is a tram stop on the East Manchester Line (EML) of Greater Manchester's light-rail Metrolink system. The stop is located by the Etihad Campus adjacent to the City of Manchester Stadium. The stop has a staggered platform layout, and has wide platforms in order to cope with large crowds which use the stop on match days or other events.

Initially intended to be known as Sportcity-Stadium, after the Sportcity area it serves, the proposal was changed following the announcement of Manchester City's Etihad Campus project. The station opened on 11 February 2013, after a three-day free trial for local residents. The station was constructed as part of Phase 3a of the Metrolink's expansion.

== Services ==
Services run every twelve minutes on each route at most operating times.

Preceding station	Manchester Metrolink	Following station
Holt Town towards Eccles	Eccles–Ashton (peak only)	Velopark towards Ashton-under-Lyne
Holt Town towards Eccles	Eccles–Ashton via MediaCityUK (off-peak only)	Velopark towards Ashton-under-Lyne
Holt Town towards Altrincham	Altrincham–Etihad Campus (evenings and Sundays only)	Terminus

For events such as football matches and concerts at the nearby Etihad Stadium and Arena, a stabling siding to accommodate waiting trams prior to the event finishing was constructed to allow quicker transportation of people following the conclusion of such events, but Metrolink does not run extra trams since the regular service was increased in January 2024.
