= JPT Bus Company =

Former British bus company based at Middleton, Greater Manchester

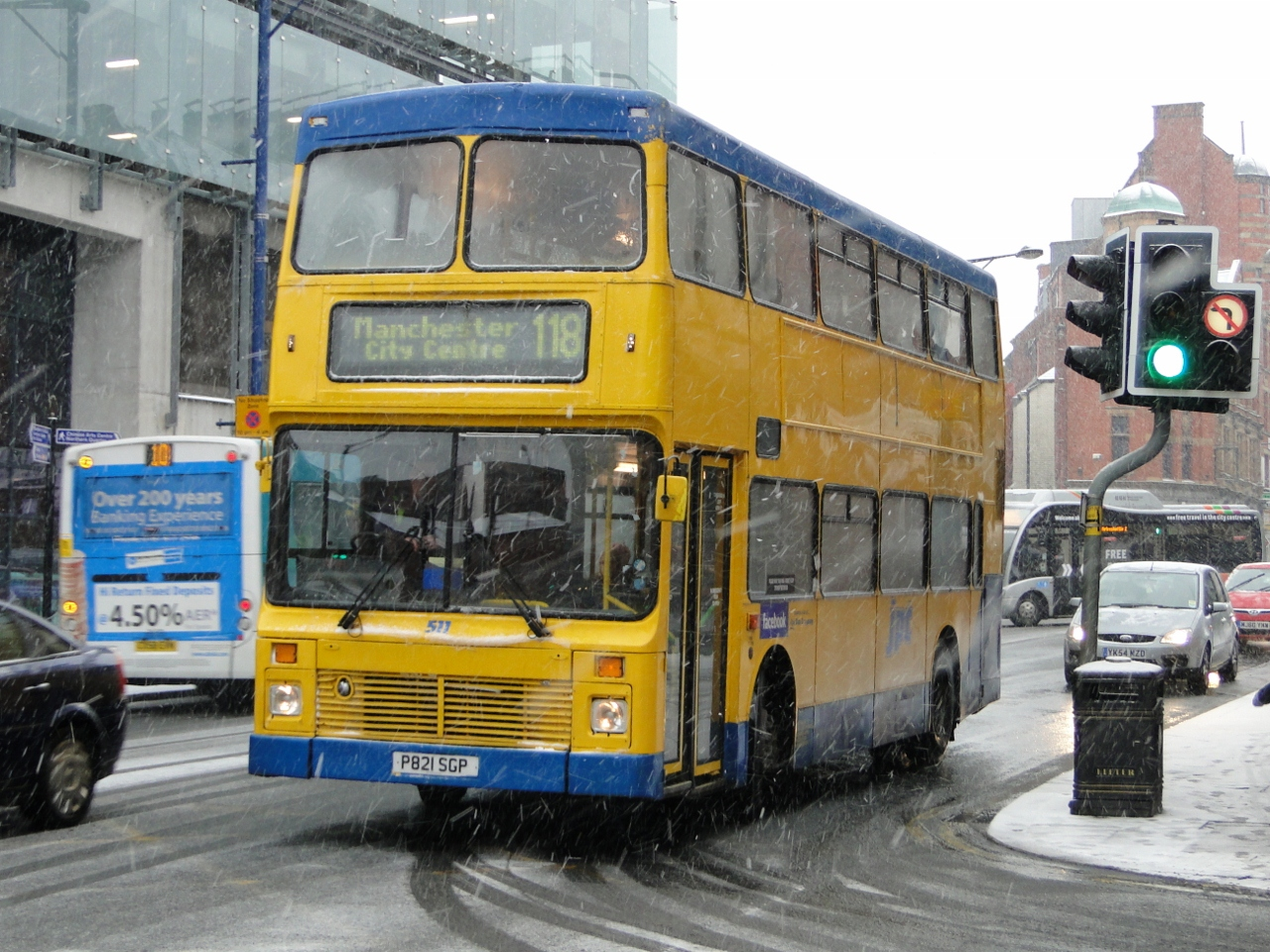
- Northern Counties Palatine bodied Volvo Olympian in February 2012
- Parent: Mark Walsh
- Founded: 1974
- Defunct: 25 April 2014
- Headquarters: Middleton
- Locale: North West England
- Service area: Greater Manchester
- Service type: Bus services
- Routes: 21 (April 2013)
- Destinations: Altrincham; Ashton-under-Lyne; Hyde; Manchester; Middleton; Oldham; Rochdale; Stalybridge; Stretford; Stockport
- Fleet: 42 (February 2014)

JPT Bus Company (formerly JP Travel), was a bus company based at Middleton, Greater Manchester, England. Operations ceased on 25 April 2014, with the business taken over by Stagecoach Manchester.

== History ==
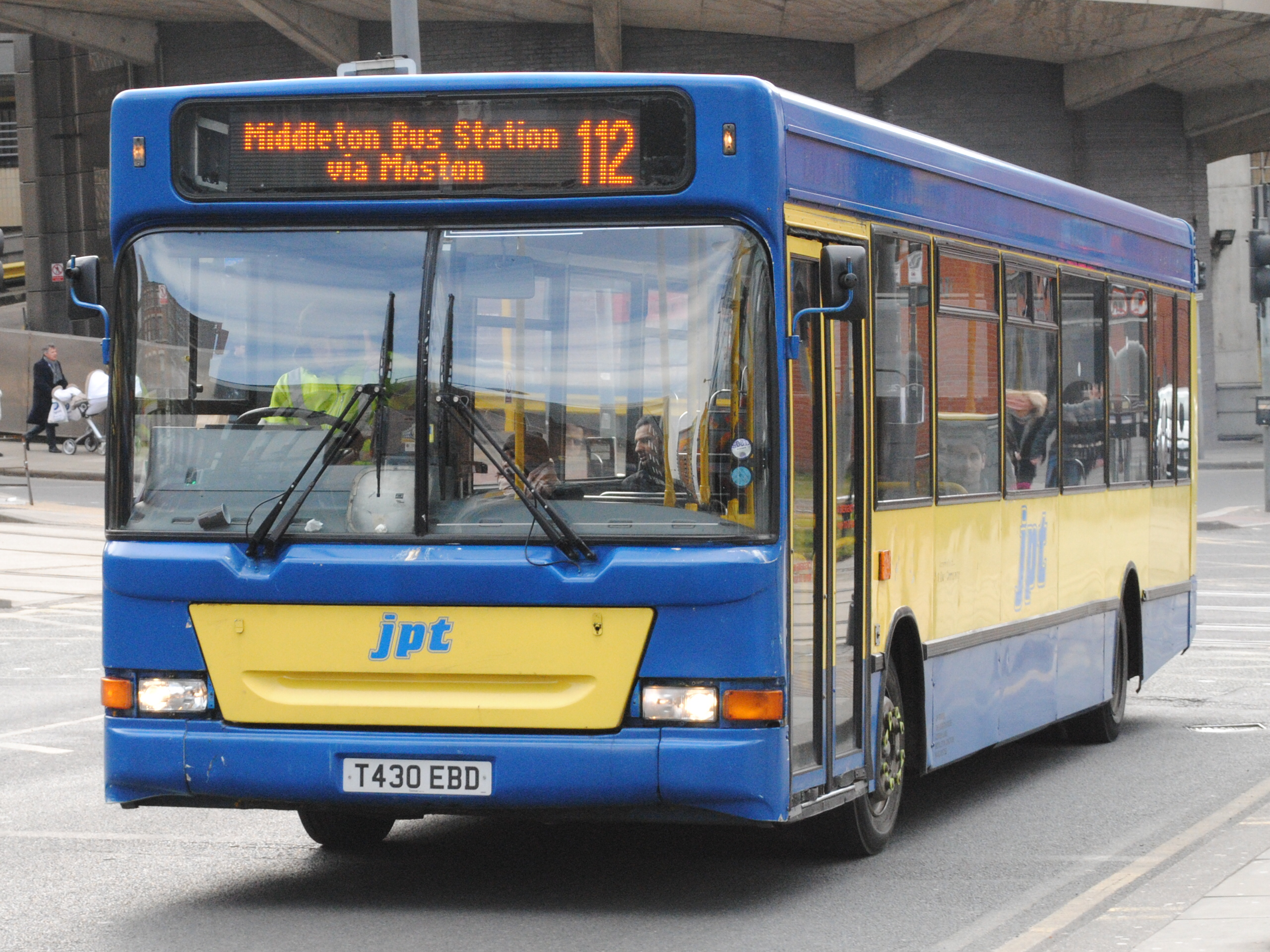
Plaxton Pointer 2 bodied Dennis Dart SLF in Manchester in March 2013

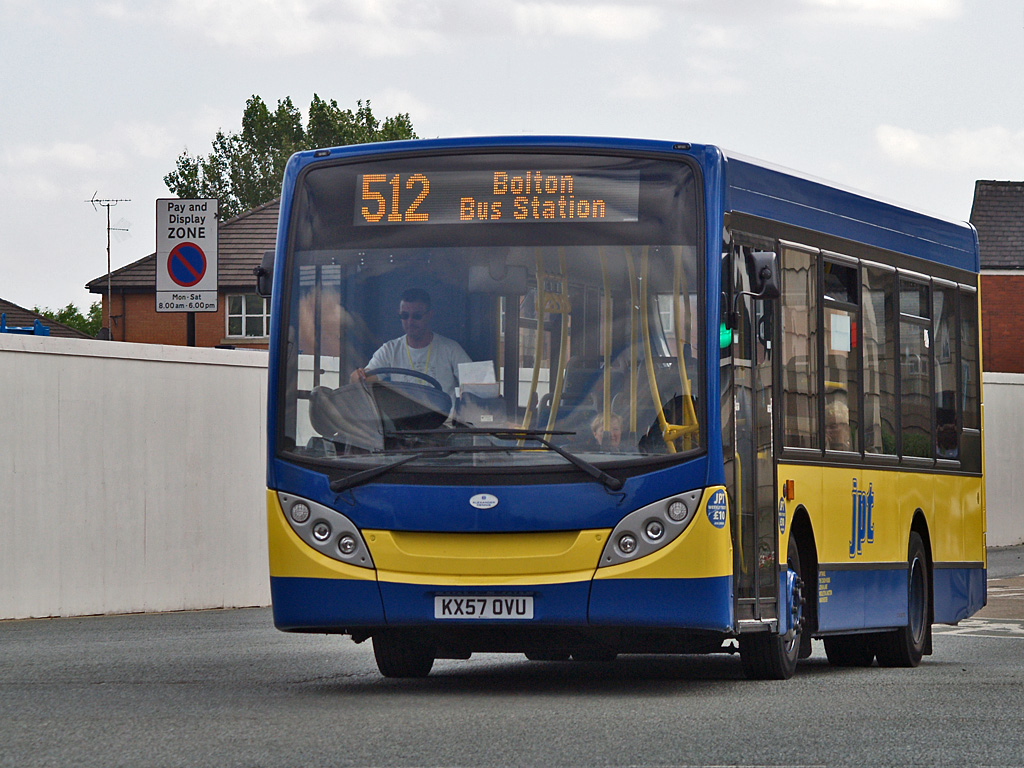
Enviro200 Dart in Bury in June 2008

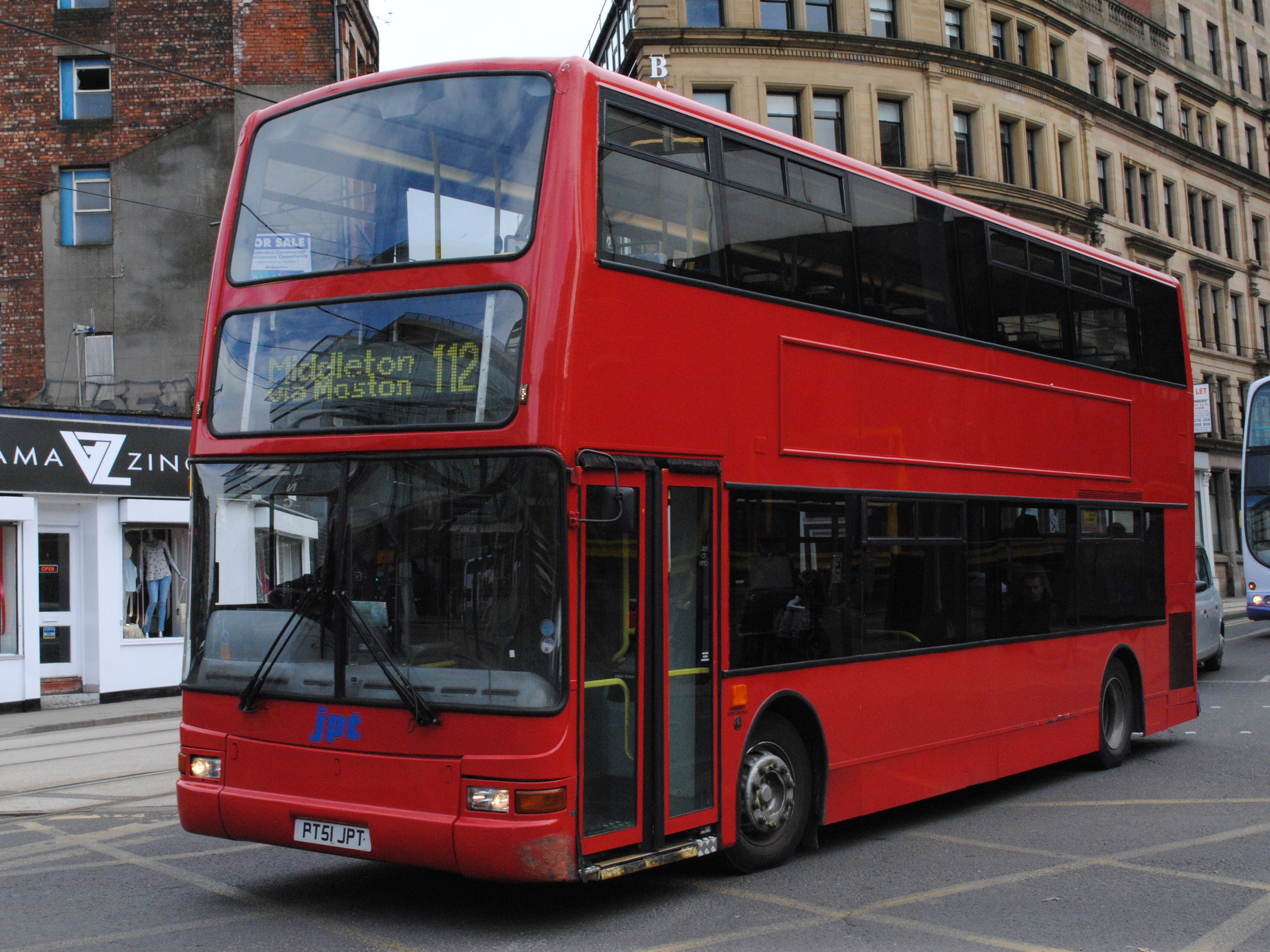
Plaxton President bodied Dennis Trident 2 in Manchester in March 2013

The company was founded in 1974 by Janet and Peter Walsh, entering the bus market in 1987. A small network of services began to form during the late 1980s under the name of "City Nippy", with the following routes being introduced within 12 months of commencing bus operations:

- 12 Middleton - Moorclose
- 62 Middleton - Moston
- 129 Middleton - Boarshaw
- 130 Langley - Middleton - Crumpsall
- 131 Middleton - Manchester
- 132 Middleton - Langley
- 133 Middleton - Alkrington

Since then, a network of services has developed across Manchester. Whilst concentrating on north Manchester, the company has gained a presence in the southern area through winning Transport for Greater Manchester tenders. In the past few years, expansion through this means has taken as far as Farnworth and Stockport.

An attempt to reroute service 162 to bypass North Manchester General Hospital met opposition from residents in the Alkrington area. The decision was reversed and the route was instead diverted to serve more of the Alkrington estate.

In 2007, they took over the services then operated by Ashall's Coaches and have since taken over the routes of the former operator, Vale Of Manchester.

Another innovation occurred in 2009, when the operator became the first on route 343, between Oldham, Mossley and Hyde, to operate low floor buses. As part of a summer promotion, in August 2009 the company halved the cost of its weekly season ticket from £10.00 to £5.00, at a time when competing major operators were cutting back on services.

In October 2009 the company was awarded the contracts for five new services in North Manchester and received a loan of £250,000 to buy new low-floor vehicles for the routes.

In 2010 Janet and Peter Walsh retired with control of the business passing to son Mark.

In January 2011, JP Travel announced that its sister company Eurobus had acquired local coach firm known as Ellenbrook Travel. Eurobus began operating on route 17 on 15 May 2011, effectively competing against First Greater Manchester on that route. Five former Stagecoach Alexander ALX200 bodied Volvo B6LEs were used, running alongside JPT on a co-ordinated timetable. The Eurobus vehicles shared the same colour scheme (except for the Eurobus logo) as JPT. In late 2012 the Eurobus operation was wound up, with all vehicles being rebranded as JPT buses, and gaining JPT fleet numbers.

In February 2012 JPT announced that they were building a second depot to run from at the former Brookfield Mill near Middleton town centre (their current one at Middleton Junction would remain open). On 20 June 2012 JPT announced via their Facebook page that they had been awarded a Licences increase, meaning they would be able to have more buses on the road.

In January 2013 JPT decided to withdraw route 17 (except one school trip); this now left First Manchester the only company on route 17. From September 2013 JPT decided to reinstate the route 17 only as far as Middleton, resulting in there being more competition on the route between itself and First Greater Manchester, but with the service running only every 20 minutes, which was not as frequent as before.

However, in January 2014 with increased competition from First Greater Manchester on the 17 and Stagecoach Manchester on route 112, JPT decided again to withdraw completely from the 17 route and operate only a few journeys on the 112 in the evenings under contract to Transport for Greater Manchester.

Operations ceased on 25 April 2014, with the business, 41 buses and most staff passing to Stagecoach Manchester.

== Fleet ==
As at February 2014, the fleet consisted of 42 buses. Fleet livery was yellow and blue.
