= Tameside General Hospital =

- Tameside and Glossop Integrated Care NHS Foundation Trust
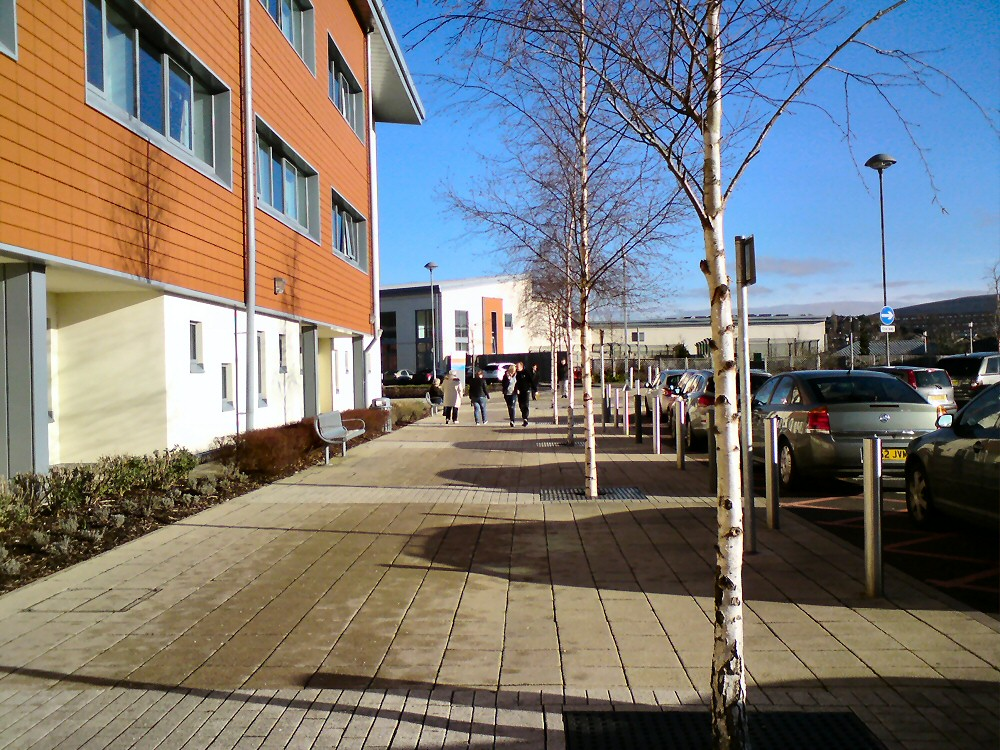
- Tameside General Hospital

- Location within Greater Manchester

Geography
- Location: Tameside, Greater Manchester, England, United Kingdom
- Coordinates: 53.49333°N 2.07111°W

Organisation
- Care system: Public NHS
- Type: District general

Services
- Emergency department: Yes Accident & Emergency

History
- Founded: 1861

Links
- Website: www.tamesidehospital.nhs.uk
- Lists: Hospitals in England

Tameside General Hospital is an acute general hospital in Ashton-under-Lyne, England, managed by Tameside and Glossop Integrated Care NHS Foundation Trust. It serves the surrounding area of Tameside in Greater Manchester, and the town of Glossop in Derbyshire. The hospital provides Accident and Emergency services, and full consultant-led obstetric and paediatric hospital services for women, children and babies.

== History ==
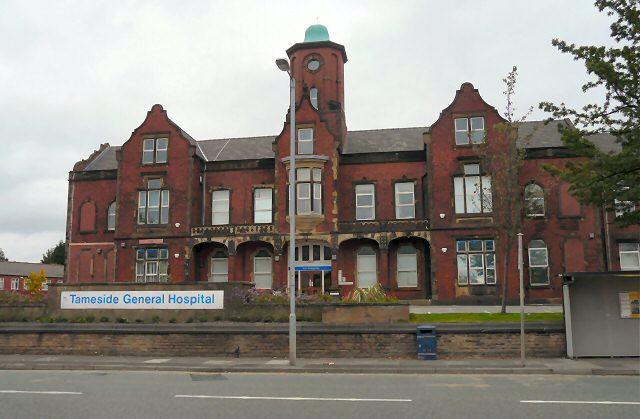
The original hospital building on Darnton Road

The hospital has its origins in the Ashton District Infirmary, founded by Samuel Oldham in 1861. Oldham’s stated intention in founding Ashton District Infirmary was to create an institution "for the relief and cure of sick and indigent persons resident, employed, or having been employed within 3½ miles of Ashton Town Hall." It became the Ashton-under-Lyne General Hospital on the formation of the National Health Service in 1948 and it became Tameside General Hospital in 1976. Subsequent expansion included the Ladysmith Building opened in 1987 and the Hartshead building which was opened by the Duchess of York in 1989.

An expansion of the hospital was procured under a Private Finance Initiative contract in 2007. The works were carried out by Balfour Beatty at a cost of £78 million were completed in 2009. The Hartshead South building was officially opened by the Duke of Gloucester in 2011.

== See also ==
- Healthcare in Greater Manchester
- List of hospitals in England
- List of NHS trusts
