= Ashton-under-Lyne Interchange =

Bus station and tram stop in Greater Manchester, England

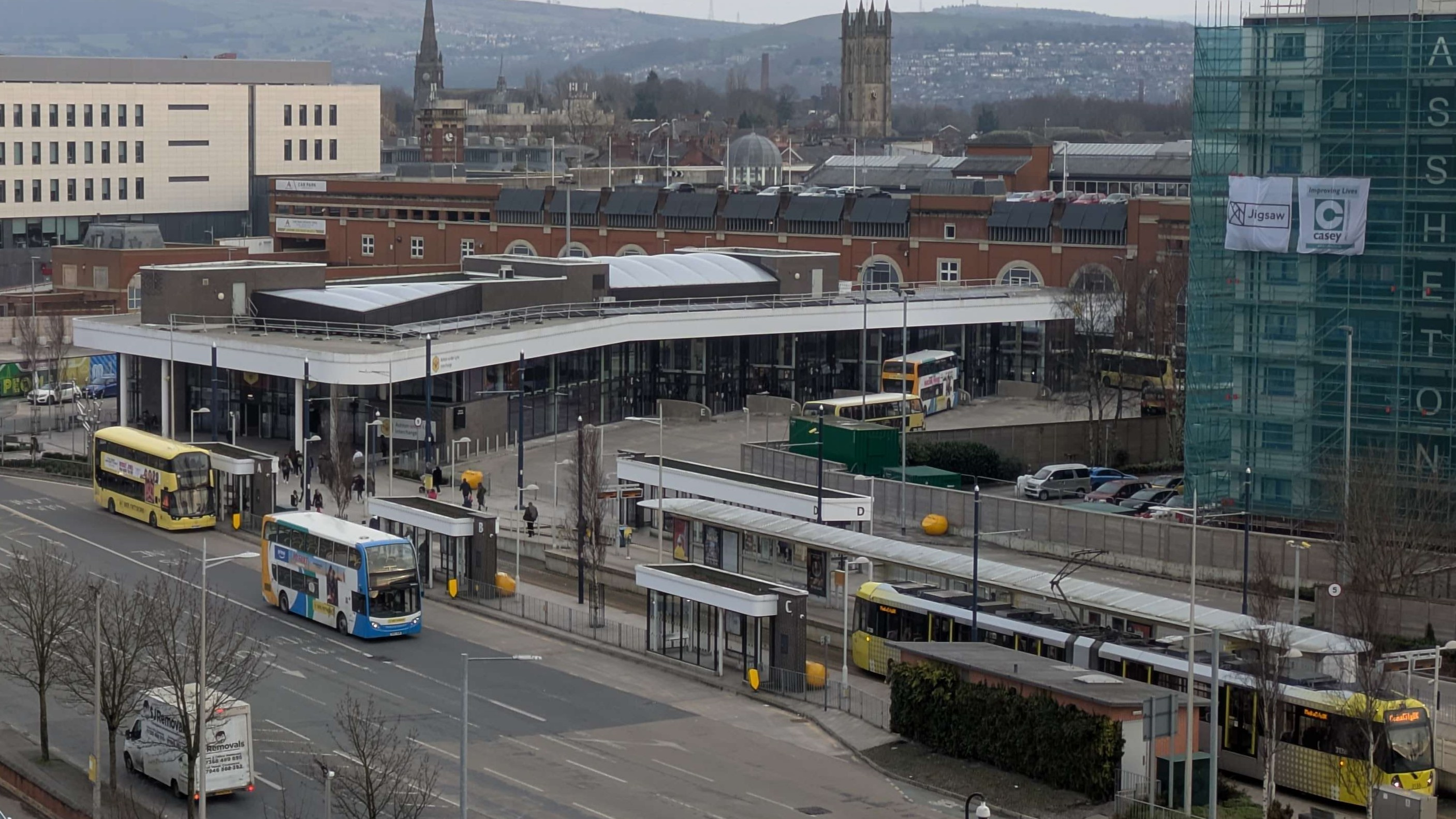
- The Interchange

General information
- Location: Ashton-under-Lyne, Tameside, England
- Manager: Bee Network
- Transit authority: Transport for Greater Manchester
- Bus routes: 7 151 216 219 230 231 237 S237 330 335 336 337 339 345 346 347 348 350 S350B 356 387 389 396 409 771 864
- Bus stands: 14 (A-P excluding I, O)
- Bus operators: Metroline Manchester; Stagecoach Manchester; Diamond North West; Go North West

Construction
- Accessible: Yes

Other information
- Status: In operation

History
- Opened: 30 August 2020; 5 years ago

Key dates
- 1963–1982: First bus station
- 1985–1993: Second bus station
- 1994–2018: Third bus station
Location

Ashton-under-Lyne Interchange is a transport hub in Ashton-under-Lyne, Greater Manchester, England. It consists of a Manchester Metrolink tram stop, opened on 9 October 2013 on the East Manchester Line, and a new bus station, opened on 30 August 2020 after being moved from its previous site near Arcades Shopping Centre and rebuilt closer to the tram stop. The interchange is a short walk away from Ashton-under-Lyne railway station.

== History ==
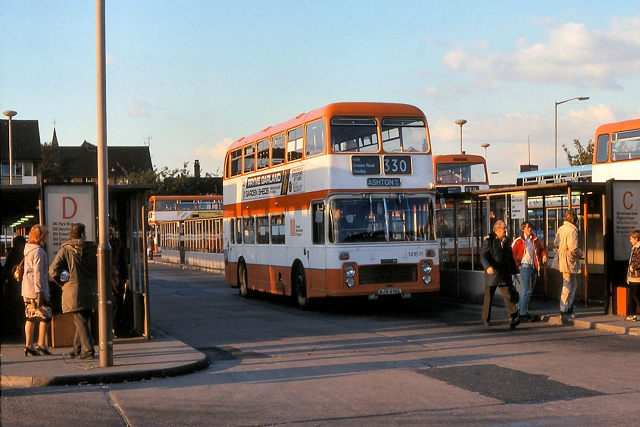
The first incarnation of the bus station shown in 1981, a few days into preparations for its refurbishment

=== Original bus station site (1963–1994) ===
In the midst of slum clearance in Ashton-under-Lyne, convenient space was left open and vacant for a new bus station right between the railway station and the town centre shops. Construction on the new bus station cost £80,000 to build (£1.48 million in 2026) and began in early 1963. The bus station facilities officially opened on 6 November of that year, with the Mayor driving the first bus. On 10 November 1963, the station opened to passenger service. By the end of the 1960s, most bus routes and services were altered to run through the new bus station.

As the bus station began to show its age, it was refurbished and some parts were rebuilt starting 1982. On 18 March 1985 at 11:30am, the refurbished bus station was reopened in its second incarnation, now with 21 stands.

A new shopping centre was to be constructed in Ashton, near to the bus station, called The Arcades; its construction required the space from the current bus station as well as some other sites in the area. A few flats near Wellington Road were demolished for this third rebuild of Ashton's bus station, which would open in summer 1994, this time with only 15 stands. The Arcades shopping centre itself opened in the next year.

=== Metrolink planning and introduction (2009–2013) ===
In May 2009, a special fund of £1.5 billion was agreed for 15 transport schemes in Greater Manchester. These included a further 2.1-mile (3.4 km) extension of the Metrolink's current East Manchester Line – which had already been set to open between Piccadilly and Droylsden in February 2013 – from Droylsden to Ashton-under-Lyne. Plans for the extension were fully approved by the Department for Transport in March 2010, whereupon MPact-Thales was appointed as the main contractor.

The originally publicised opening date was winter 2013-2014; however, the extension opened fully on 9 October 2013, a few months early, along with the new terminus at Ashton. This was surrounded by some green space, which would later become bus-only roads and stands for the future fourth incarnation of the bus station.

=== New bus station site and rebuild (2014–2020) ===
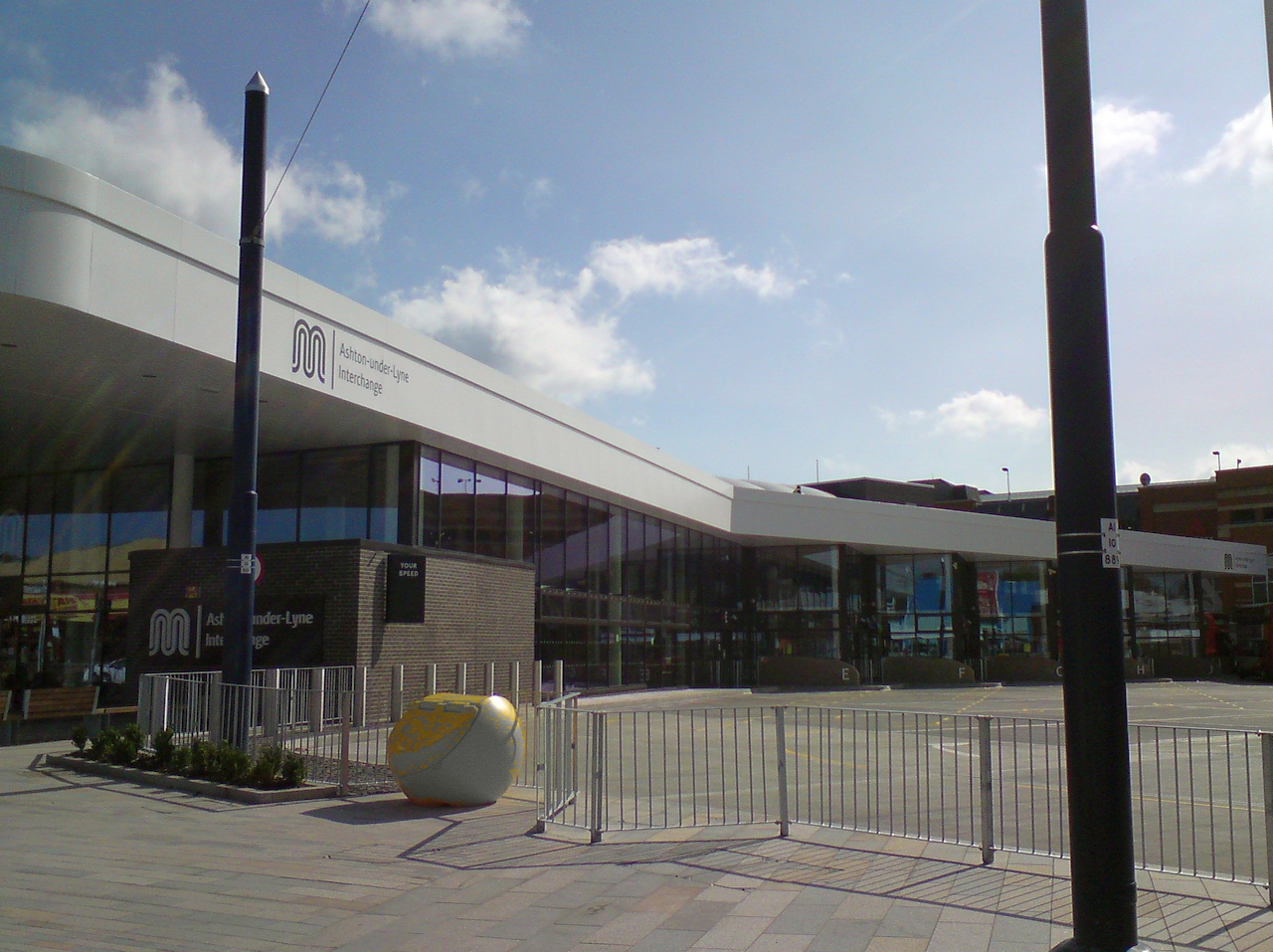
The Interchange seen from Stand D

On 7 July 2014, the deputy prime minister, Nick Clegg, announced that development of a new multi-modal interchange facility within Ashton town centre was to start as part of Greater Manchester's wider Local Growth Deal package. It would replace the current island-style waiting shelters with a single high-quality building, which would bring the bus station closer to the Metrolink stop, which itself had opened recently.

Around £1.8 million was spent demolishing the previous bus station, and following a public consultation between August and September 2015, work commenced on the £32.7 million interchange in June 2018, funded with support from the central government's Local Growth Deal programme and constructed by Vinci Construction UK. The new bus station opened on 30 August 2020 with capacity for up to 145 bus departures an hour, redirecting 90% of bus services running to Ashton-under-Lyne. It included a covered concourse and a ticket/passenger information desk, features not at the previous bus station.

The former site of the third incarnation of the bus station has been unused since 2020, and council chiefs agreed to buy the site for a possible future redevelopment in 2023.

== Layout ==
The bus station and tram stop are at street-level; the two are connected via a pedestrianised area.

=== Buses ===
The bus station has 14 stands, lettered from A to P (leaving out I and O). Stands A to D aren't located adjacent to the main building, but instead surround the tram stop. There is an entrance gate for buses on Oldham Road and an exit onto Wellington Road.

=== Metrolink ===
Ashton-under-Lyne tram stop has two island platforms, which aren't numbered. Most of the tram stop is covered by a canopy extending across the platforms. Two double-sided dot matrix passenger information displays stand serving one platform each; they show estimated arrival times for trams the next three services and number of carriages.

== Services ==
=== Buses ===
Services from Ashton-under-Lyne Interchange are operated mostly by Metroline Manchester, with the remainder by Stagecoach Manchester, Go North West and Diamond Bus North West. All of these bus services operate within a franchise, under contract to the Bee Network integrated transport system; Ashton bus station was part of Tranche 3 (the final stage) of the Bee Network's franchising, which took place on 5 January 2025. As of 2026, 22 different Bee Network bus routes run through the interchange, plus two school bus services.

=== Metrolink ===
Ashton-under-Lyne
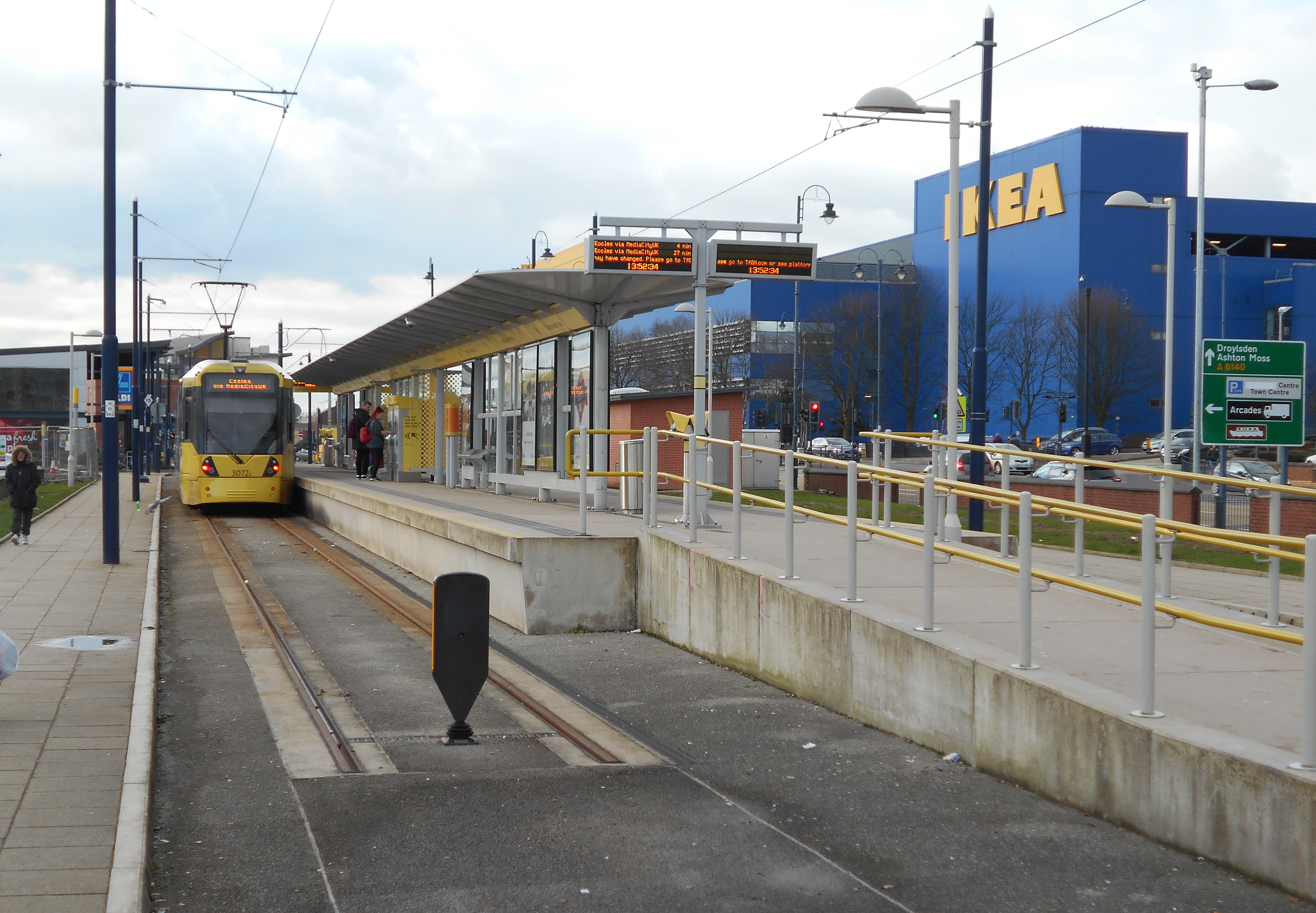
- The tram stop in February 2018.

General information
- Location: Ashton-under-Lyne, Tameside, England
- Coordinates: 53.49035°N 2.09806°W
- System: Manchester Metrolink
- Line: East Manchester Line
- Platforms: 2

Other information
- Status: In operation
- Fare zone: 3

History
- Opened: 9 October 2013; 12 years ago
Route map
Location

Every route across the Manchester Metrolink network operates to a 12-minute headway (5 tph) Mondays–Saturdays and to a 15-minute headway (4 tph) on Sundays and bank holidays.

Ashton-under-Lyne is located in Zone 3 and the stop itself has two island platforms. Trams to Eccles, via Manchester city centre, operate from here; both services can depart from either platform.

Preceding station	Manchester Metrolink	Following station
Ashton West towards Eccles	Eccles–Ashton (peak only)	Terminus
Ashton West towards Eccles	Eccles–Ashton via MediaCityUK (off-peak only)	Terminus

When Ashton tram stop first opened, all services ran to Bury Interchange via Victoria. Shortly afterwards, in 2014, all services were set to run to Eccles via MediaCityUK. From 26 June 2015, services were diverted to Rochdale Town Centre via Victoria for the rebuild of St Peter's Square. The first full closure of the line through St Peter's Square lasted two months, then the line reopened with only single-track working through St Peter's Square as the tram stop was still being rebuilt. A new route was added between Etihad Campus and Altrincham at this time. After the works finished on 28 August 2016, trams from Ashton began running to Eccles again, with a small service change of the Etihad Campus service running to Bury via Victoria for a short time at the end of 2016.

In 2018, the Etihad Campus service was changed to operate to MediaCityUK and, in 2019, it was extended further to operate from Ashton to MediaCityUK through Etihad Campus; however, in early 2021, the route was cut back to its original Etihad Campus to MediaCityUK. Multiple minor changes to services took place as a result of the COVID-19 pandemic.

There is a single weekly service from Ashton-under-Lyne to Trafford Bar departing every Saturday only at 09:53, returning to Trafford Depot after the peak service from Etihad Campus to MediaCityUK begins, which stops trams from Ashton running via MediaCityUK. This means the route becomes shorter and one tram needs to be taken out of service. This tram is re-entered after the peak service ends as the 18:37 departure from MediaCityUK to Ashton.

== See also ==
- Ashton-under-Lyne railway station
