= Eccles Interchange =

Bus station and tram stop in Greater Manchester, England

Eccles
- The Metrolink and bus stop at Eccles Interchange in October 2026.

General information
- Location: Eccles, City of Salford; England
- Coordinates: 53.48307°N 2.33456°W
- Grid reference: SJ779985
- System: Metrolink station
- Line: Eccles Line
- Platforms: 1

Other information
- Status: In operation
- Fare zone: 2

History
- Opened: 21 July 2000
- Original company: Manchester Metrolink
Route map
Location

Eccles Interchange is a transport hub in Eccles, Greater Manchester, England. It is composed of a bus station and a single-platform Metrolink light rail station, the latter of which is the terminus of the system's Eccles Line, and opened on 21 July 2000. The interchange is roughly 300 metres (330 yd) away from Eccles railway station.

== History ==
The Eccles line for the Metrolink was approved in 1996, with the station being built on Regent Street in the town centre, next to existing bus stops. The station was opened for service on 21 July 2000, while the station was given the official opening, along with the Eccles line, in January 2001, when the Princess Royal visited the town centre. The new bus station was built next to the existing tram stop and opened in 2001, with additional stops and shelter added adjacent to the station in 2005.

== Metrolink services ==
Preceding station	Manchester Metrolink	Following station
Terminus	Eccles–Ashton (peak only)	Ladywell towards Ashton-under-Lyne
Terminus	Eccles–Ashton via MediaCityUK (off-peak only)	Ladywell towards Ashton-under-Lyne

== Bus services ==
The majority of services are run by Go North West, with the remainder of services run by Stagecoach Manchester, Diamond Bus North West and Metroline Manchester.

There are frequent buses running to Manchester, Pendleton, Brookhouse, Irlam, Cadishead, Seedley, Weaste, Salford Royal Hospital, Worsley and the Trafford Centre. Buses also run to Sale, Farnworth, Bolton, Swinton, Winton, Stockport and Warrington.
