= Brooklands tram stop =

Manchester Metrolink tram stop

Brooklands
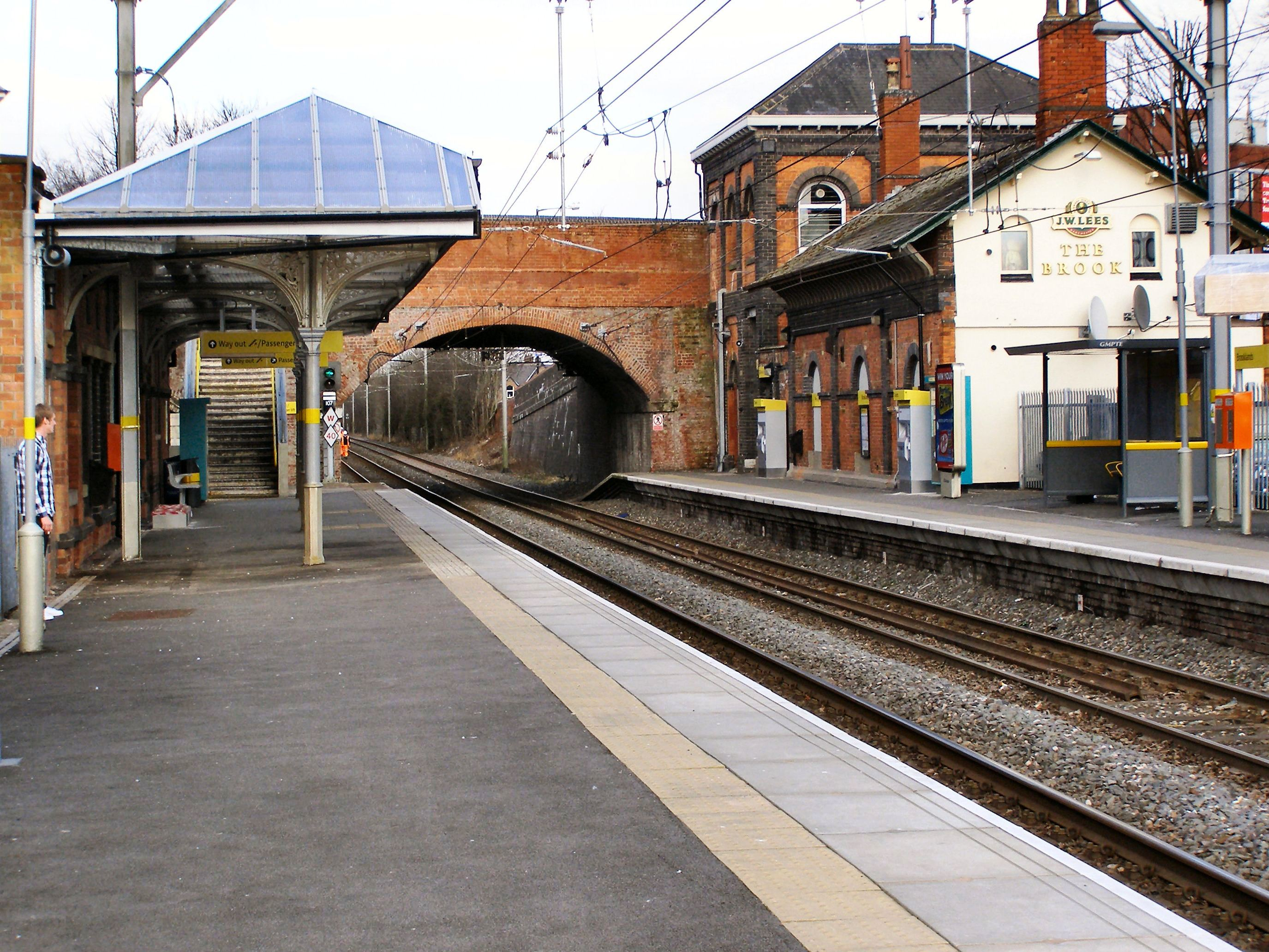
- Brooklands Metrolink station in 2010

General information
- Location: Brooklands, Trafford; England
- Coordinates: 53.41709°N 2.32603°W
- Grid reference: SJ783911
- System: Metrolink station
- Line: Altrincham Line
- Platforms: 2

Other information
- Status: In operation
- Fare zone: 2/3

History
- Opened: 1 December 1859
- Original company: MSJAR
- Pre-grouping: MSJAR
- Post-grouping: MSJAR; London Midland Region of British Railways

Key dates
- 24 December 1991: Closed as a rail station
- 15 June 1992: Conversion to Metrolink operation
Route map
Location

Brooklands is a tram stop and park and ride site on the Altrincham Line of Greater Manchester's light-rail Metrolink system in the Brooklands area of Sale. It opened on 15 June 1992 as part of Phase 1 of Metrolink's expansion.

== History ==
The station was originally opened on 1 December 1859 by the Manchester, South Junction and Altrincham Railway (MSJAR) after Samuel Brooks, a Manchester banker, built an estate of large houses along Brooklands Road. It closed as a British Rail station on 24 December 1991 before reopening as a Metrolink station on 15 June 1992.

In January 1999, Brooklands Station became a Grade II listed building.

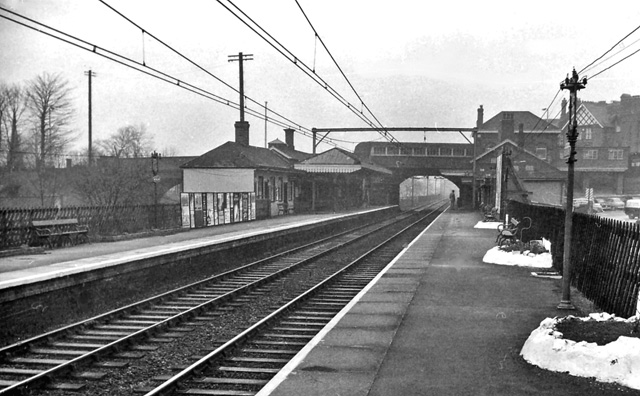
Brooklands railway station in 1962.

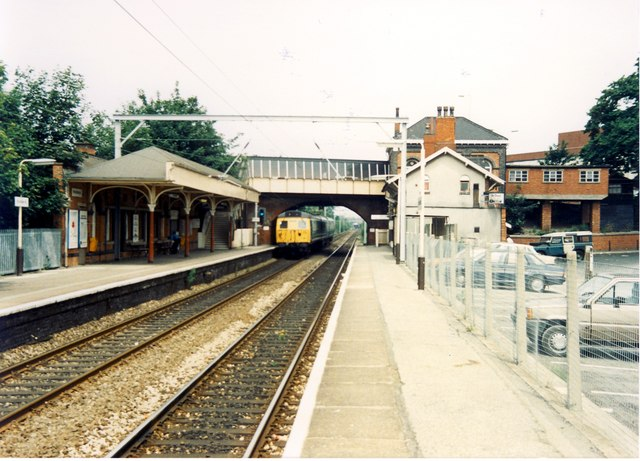
Brooklands station in 1988, prior to conversion to Metrolink.

== Services ==
Brooklands is on the Altrincham Line, with trams towards Altrincham stopping every 6 minutes during the day, Monday to Saturday, every 12 minutes Monday to Saturday evenings and Sundays. Trams also head towards Manchester and Bury, with the Monday to Saturday daytime service running every 12 minutes each to Piccadilly or Bury, while evening and Sunday journeys run to Etihad Campus.

=== Service pattern ===
- 10 trams per hour to Altrincham (5 off-peak)
- 5 trams per hour to Bury (peak only)
- 5 trams per hour to Piccadilly

=== Ticket zones ===
As of January 2019, Brooklands is located in Metrolink ticket zones 3 and 4.

== Connecting bus routes ==
Brooklands is served hourly by Diamond Bus route 281, which runs from Altrincham to Sale, via Broadheath, Timperley, and Brooklands Road.

== See also ==
- Listed buildings in Sale, Greater Manchester

Preceding station	Manchester Metrolink	Following station
Timperley towards Altrincham	Altrincham–Bury (peak only)	Sale towards Bury
Timperley towards Altrincham	Altrincham–Piccadilly	Sale towards Piccadilly
