= Brooklands, Greater Manchester =

Area of Greater Manchester, England

Coordinates: 53.411089°N 2.3137°W

Brooklands
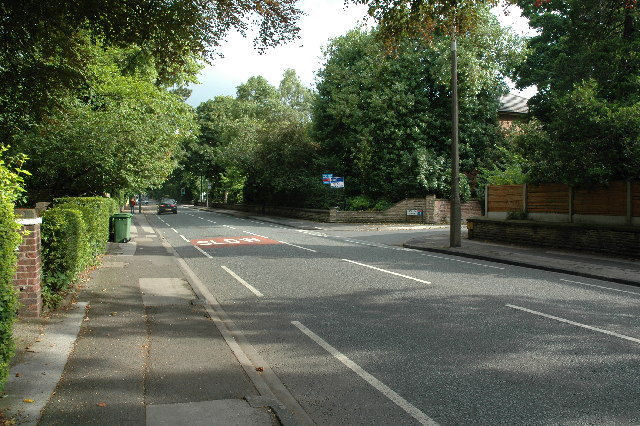
- Brooklands Road

- Location within Greater Manchester
- Population: 24,796 (2011 census)
- OS grid reference: SJ791905
- Metropolitan borough: Trafford and Manchester
- Metropolitan county: Greater Manchester
- Region: North West
- Country: England
- Sovereign state: United Kingdom
- Post town: SALE
- Postcode district: M33
- Dialling code: 0161
- Police: Greater Manchester
- Fire: Greater Manchester
- Ambulance: North West
- UK Parliament: Wythenshawe and Sale East

Brooklands is an area of Greater Manchester, England, 5.7 miles (9.2 km) southwest of Manchester city centre. It had a population of 24,796 at the 2011 census (10,434 in Trafford and 14,362 in Manchester).

== History ==
The area is named after Samuel Brooks, a Manchester banker and businessman who first bought land in the area from the Earl of Stamford in 1856; he subsequently made further purchases with the intention of developing them.

The area was crossed by the Manchester, South Junction and Altrincham Railway (MSJ&AR), which opened in 1849. A year before, in 1855, 45 residents had petitioned the company to build a station between Sale and Timperley. However the railway company took no action. After Brooks bought land in the area, he began negotiating terms for a station to be built. His offer was an acre of land for £200 to the MSJ&AR and a guarantee of compensation to the company if the station was not profitable. In December 1859 Brooklands was opened.

In 1862, Brooks built a private road running southeast from the station. Land adjacent to this private highway was sold as plots for upmarket residences. The road runs from Brooklands Station all the way to the A538 Altrincham–Wilmslow road at Hale. Part of the route uses the existing Roaring Gate Lane.

== Transport ==
The Manchester Metrolink tram network passes through the area; Brooklands Station is now a tram stop on the line between Manchester city centre and Altrincham.

== Governance ==
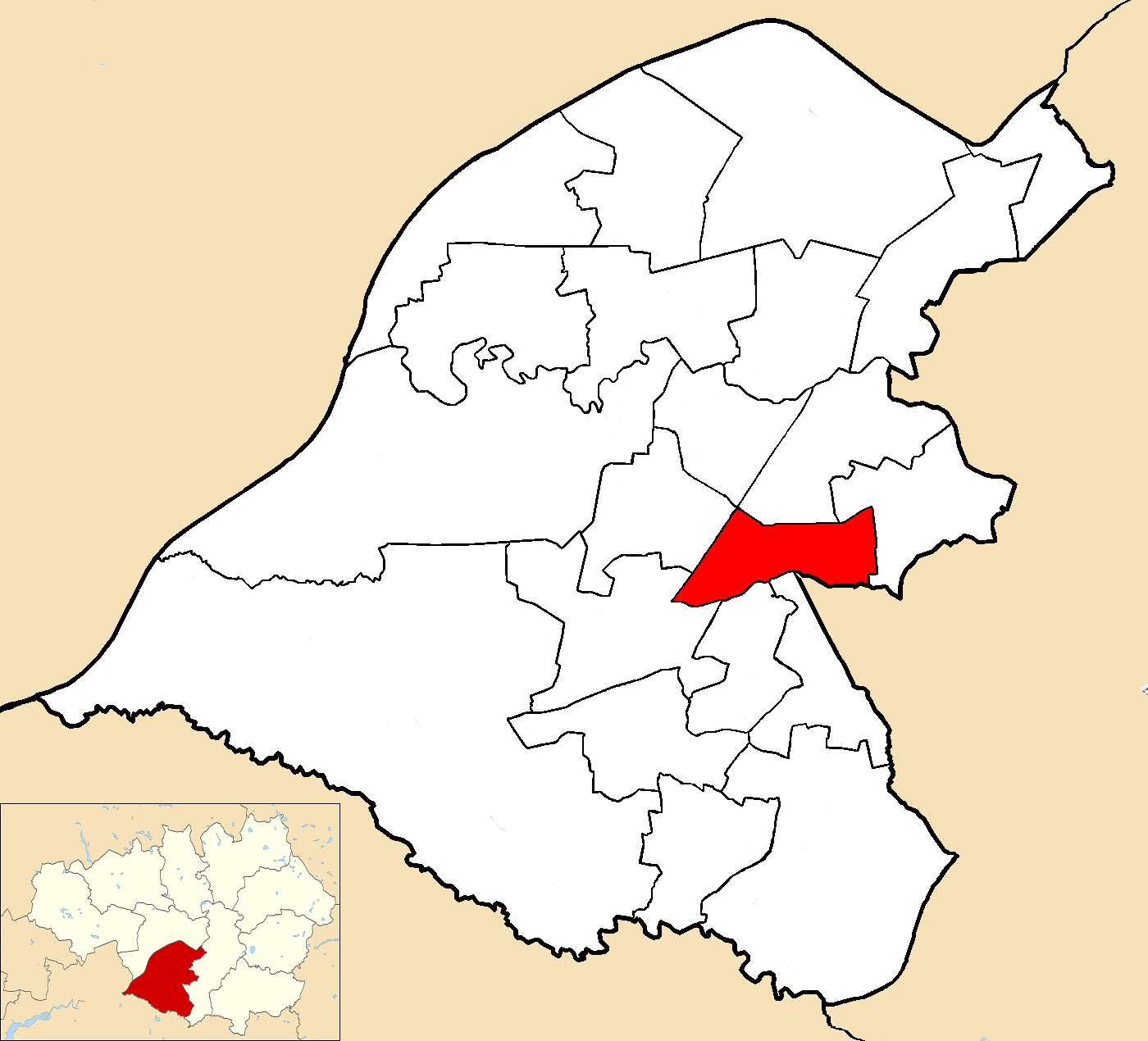
Brooklands (Trafford ward)

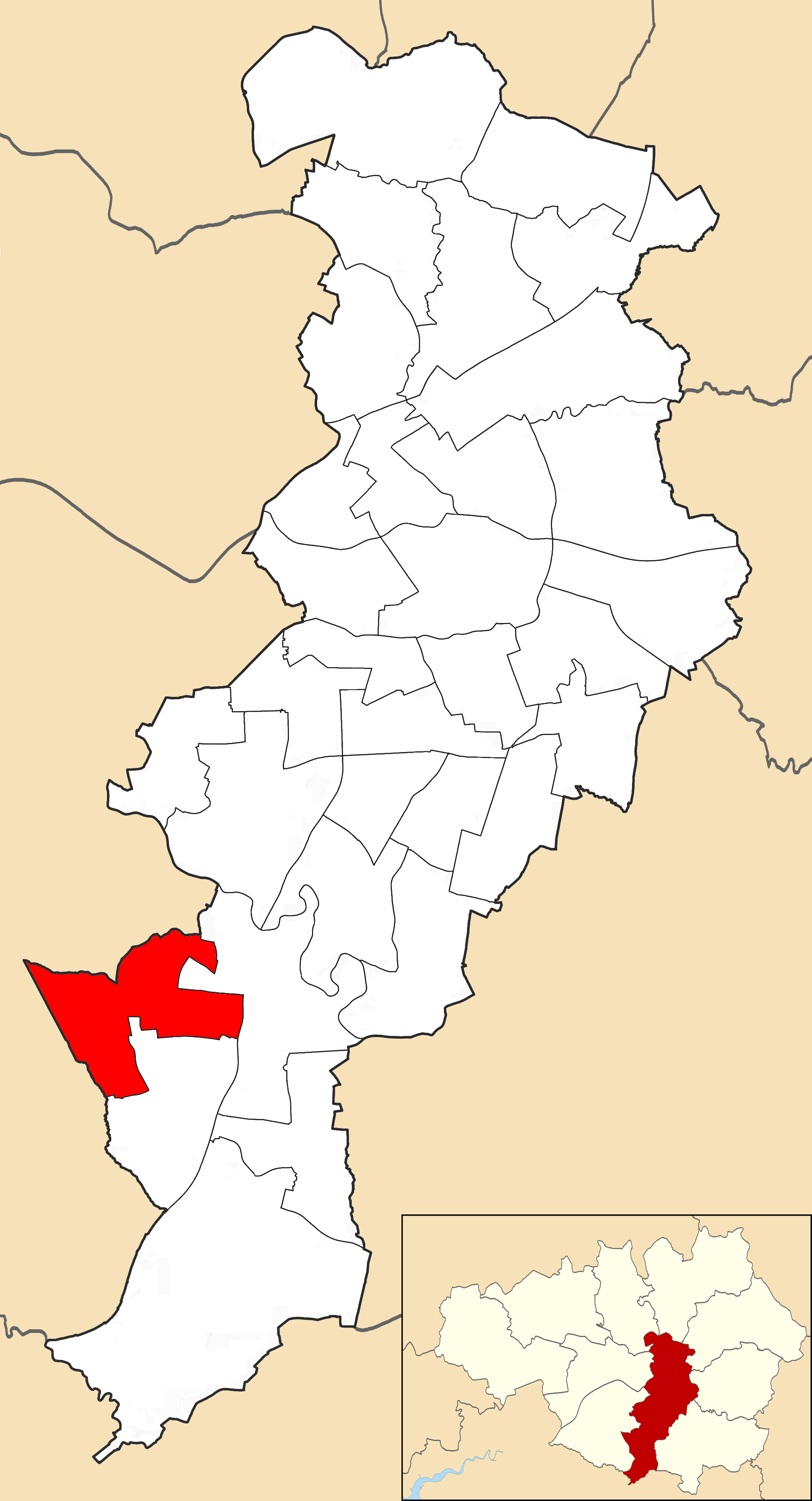
Brooklands (Manchester ward)

The area elects three councillors to Trafford Metropolitan Borough Council via its Trafford ward, currently Chris Boyes and David Hopps of the Conservative Party and Steven Longden of the Labour Party.

It also elects three councillors to Manchester City Council via its Manchester ward. Currently, all three councillors, Sue Murphy (also Council Deputy Leader), Sue Cooley, and Glynn Evans are members of the Labour Party.

Both wards are represented in Westminster by Mike Kane MP for Wythenshawe and Sale East.

== Brooklands cemetery ==
Some notable individuals who are buried in Brooklands cemetery are:

- James Joule (1818–1889), a notable English physicist, who lent his name to the standard unit of energy.
- Richard Pankhurst (1834–1898), barrister, husband of Emmeline Pankhurst and father to Adela Pankhurst, Christabel Pankhurst and Sylvia Pankhurst is buried alongside his parents.
- Rev John Relly Beard (1800–1876), a Unitarian minister, schoolmaster, university lecturer, and translator who co-founded Unitarian College Manchester.
