= Sale tram stop =

Manchester Metrolink tram stop

Sale
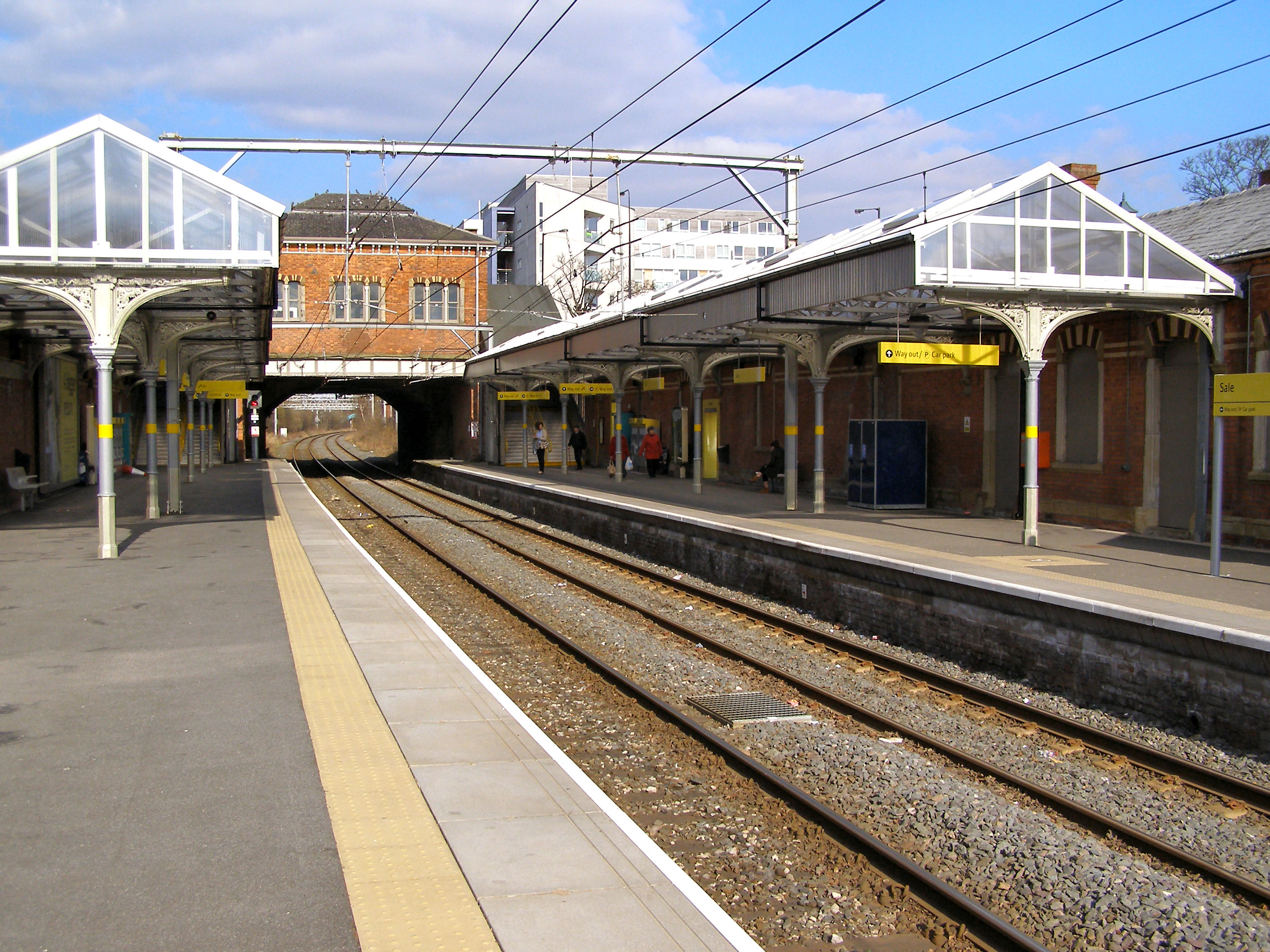
- Sale is one of the network’s converted heavy-rail stations

General information
- Location: M33 7XY; Sale, Trafford; England
- Coordinates: 53.42425°N 2.31907°W
- Grid reference: SJ788919
- System: Metrolink station
- Line: Altrincham Line
- Platforms: 2

Other information
- Status: In operation
- Fare zone: 3

History
- Opened: 20 July 1849
- Former names: Sale Moor (1856); Sale & Ashton on Mersey (1883)
- Original company: MSJAR
- Pre-grouping: MSJAR
- Post-grouping: MSJAR; London Midland Region of British Railways

Key dates
- 24 December 1991: Closed as a rail station
- 15 June 1992: Conversion to Metrolink operation
- 1931: Renamed
Route map
Location

Sale is a tram stop on the Altrincham Line of the Metrolink light-rail system in Sale, Greater Manchester, England. It opened on 15 June 1992 as part of Phase 1 of Metrolink's expansion. Prior to this, it was a railway station on the Manchester, South Junction and Altrincham Railway (MSJAR) line. It was built by John Brogden, who was a local builder in the Sale area.

== History ==
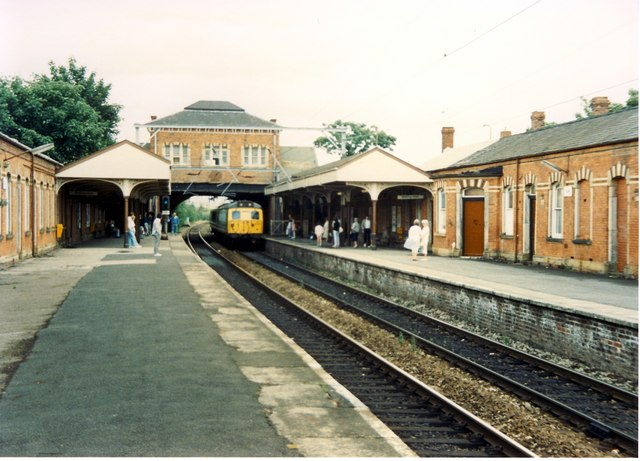
In 1988, as a British Rail station

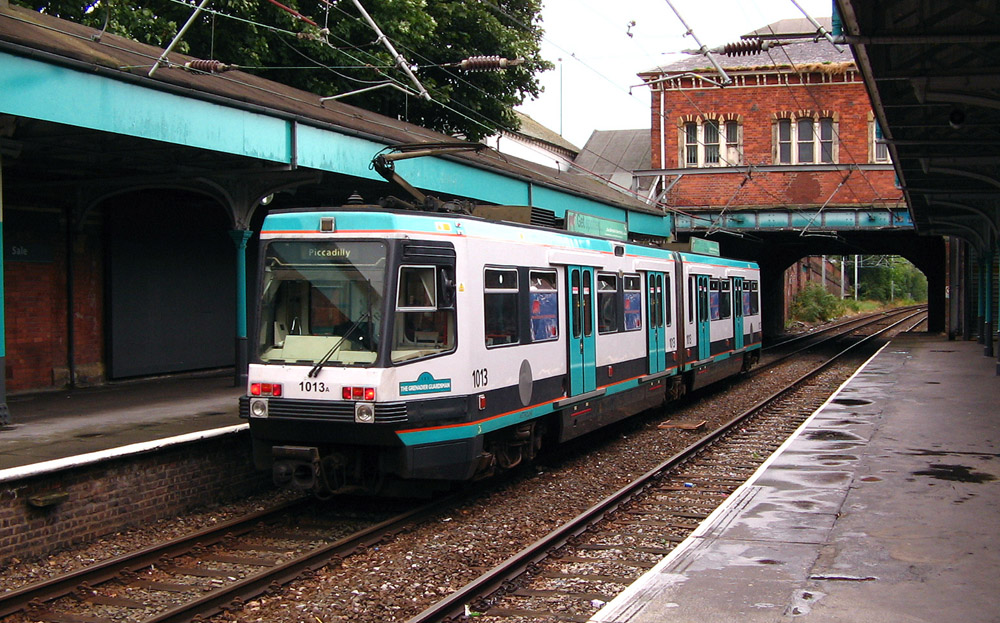
In 2006 with a T-68 Calling on a service to Piccadilly, prior to refurbishment

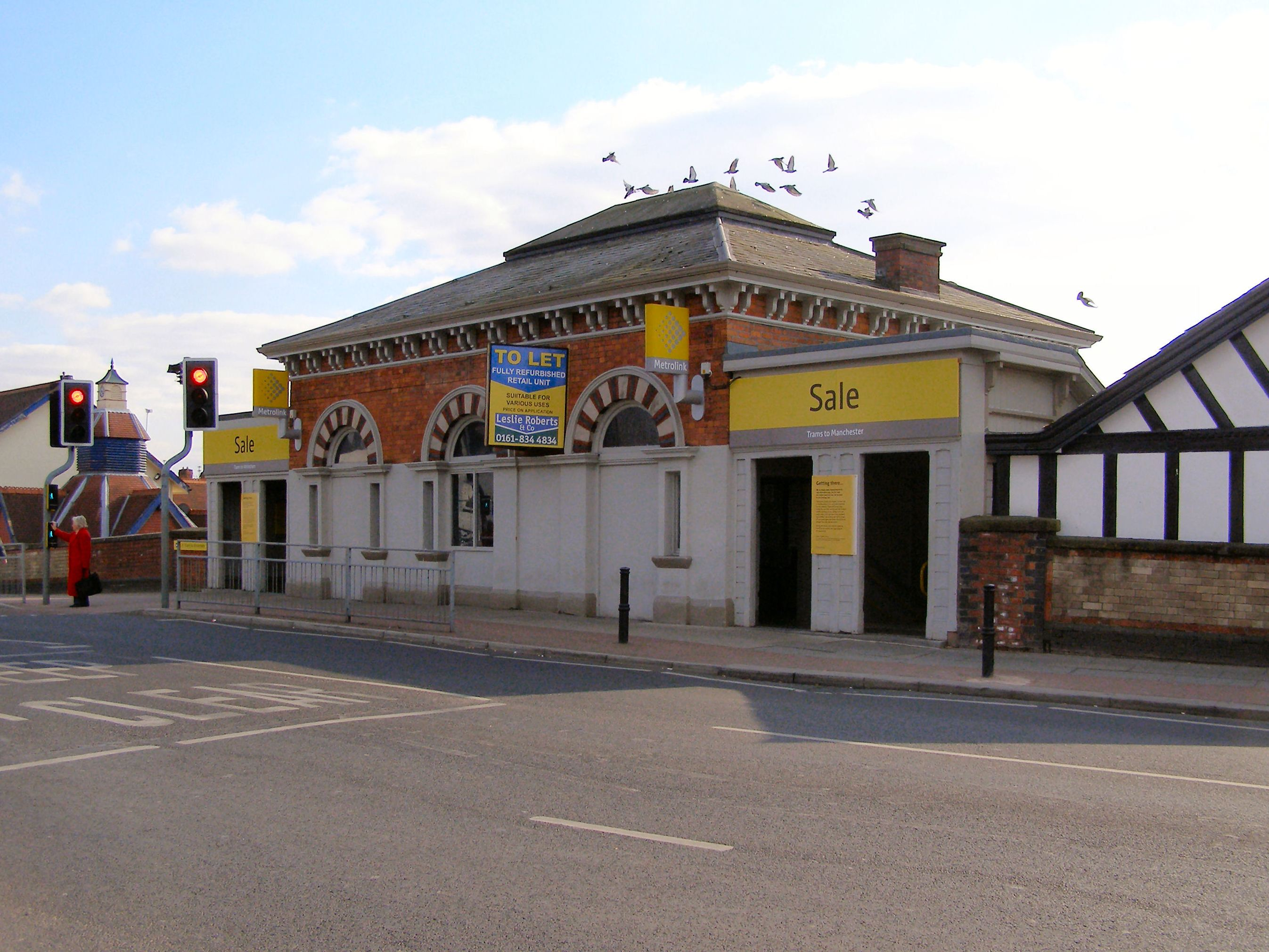
The current exterior of the station

The station originally opened as Sale on 20 July 1849 by the MSJAR. Renamed as Sale Moor in 1856, as Sale & Ashton on Mersey in 1883 and as Sale in 1931. It closed as a British Rail station on 24 December 1991 and reopened as a Metrolink station on 15 June 1992.

Sale tram stop briefly appears during the opening titles of Pro Evolution Soccer 2, which was released in 2002.

== Services ==
Sale is on the Altrincham Line, with trams towards Altrincham stopping every 6 minutes during the day, Mondays to Saturdays, every 12 minutes Monday to Saturday evenings and Sundays. Trams also head towards Manchester and Bury, with the Monday to Saturday daytime service running every 12 minutes each to Etihad Campus or Bury, while evening and Sunday journeys run to Etihad Campus only, with journeys to Bury requiring a change of trams at Piccadilly Gardens.

=== Service pattern ===
- 10 trams per hour to Altrincham (5 off-peak)
- 5 trams per hour to Bury (peak only)
- 5 trams per hour to Piccadilly

=== Ticket zones ===
As of January 2019, Sale is located in Metrolink ticket zone 3.

== Connecting bus routes ==
Sale tram stop is well served by bus services, due to the close proximity to the town centre, with several services stopping outside and some stopping around the town centre.

Services that stop outside the station:

- Metroline Manchester (Bee Network) services 248, 249 and 281. (248 - Eccles, 249 - Altrincham, and 281 - Altrincham
- Stagecoach Manchester (Bee Network) service 41 to Middleton via Northenden and Fallowfield, Manchester city centre, Cheetham Hill and North Manchester General Hospital.

Preceding station	Manchester Metrolink	Following station
Brooklands towards Altrincham	Altrincham–Bury (peak only)	Dane Road towards Bury
Brooklands towards Altrincham	Altrincham–Piccadilly	Dane Road towards Piccadilly
Disused railways
Altrincham; Line and station open	Cheshire Lines Committee; Mid-Cheshire Line	Manchester Central; 1880–1969; Line and station closed
Altrincham; Line and station open	BR (London Midland Region); Mid-Cheshire Line	Manchester Oxford Road; 1969–89; Line closed, station open
