= Navigation Road station =

Railway station in Greater Manchester, England

Navigation Road
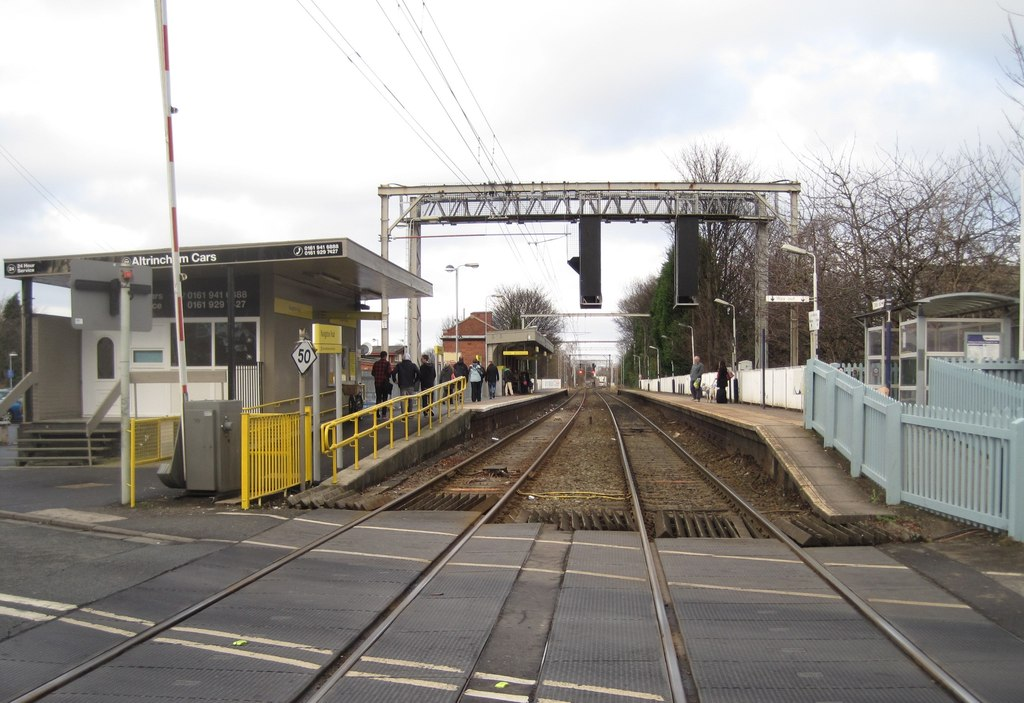
- The station in 2010

General information
- Location: Altrincham, Trafford, England
- Coordinates: 53.3953°N 2.3433°W
- Grid reference: SJ772888
- Manager: Northern Trains
- Transit authority: Greater Manchester
- Platforms: 2 (1 National Rail, 1 Metrolink)

Other information
- Station code: NVR
- Classification: DfT category F2

Passengers
- 2020/21: ▼21,166
- 2021/22: ▲57,620
- 2022/23: ▲72,084
- 2023/24: ▲82,312
- 2024/25: ▲96,498
Location
Notes
- Passenger statistics from the Office of Rail and Road

Navigation Road station serves the east of Altrincham, in Greater Manchester, England. It lies on the Mid-Cheshire line and the Altrincham Line of the Manchester Metrolink network. There are two bidirectional platforms: one for heavy rail and one for light rail. A level crossing operates at the southern end of the station.

== History ==
The station was opened on 20 July 1931, on the Manchester, South Junction and Altrincham Railway (MSJAR) following the electrification of that line, and was referred to as Navigation Road (Altrincham) on early tickets and timetables. British Rail electric multiple units between Manchester Piccadilly and Altrincham ceased on 24 December 1991. The former Altrincham-bound (down) platform has since been used for Mid-Cheshire Line trains and the former Manchester-bound (up) platform reopened as a Metrolink stop on 15 June 1992.

== Facilities ==
There is a car park on the Metrolink side of the station with 71 spaces, including five for blue badge holders. A ticket machine is installed within the shelter on the heavy rail side of the station.

== Services ==
=== Railway ===
Northern Trains operates hourly services between Manchester Piccadilly, Stockport, Northwich and Chester, with additional trains at peak times. The Sunday service runs at a two-hourly frequency.

=== Metrolink ===
Navigation Road
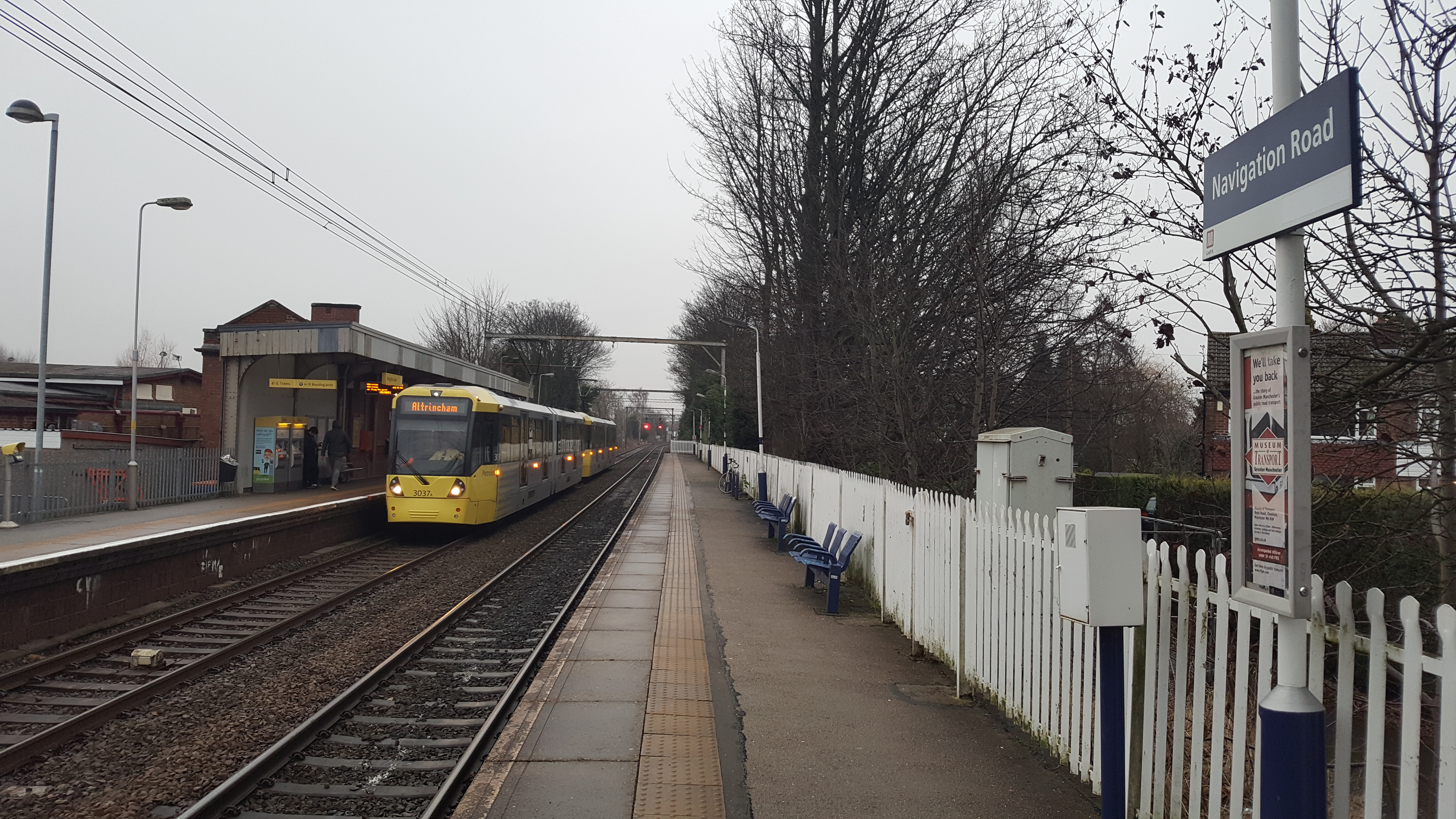
- A M5000 tram bound for Altrincham in 2017

General information
- Location: Altrincham, Trafford; England
- Coordinates: 53.39587°N 2.34327°W
- System: Metrolink station
- Line: Altrincham Line
- Platforms: 1

Other information
- Status: In operation
- Fare zone: 4

History
- Opened: 20 July 1931
- Original company: Manchester, South Junction and Altrincham Railway
- Post-grouping: Manchester, South Junction and Altrincham Railway

Key dates
- 25 December 1991: Closed as a railway station
- 15 June 1992: Reopened as a Metrolink stop
Route map
Location

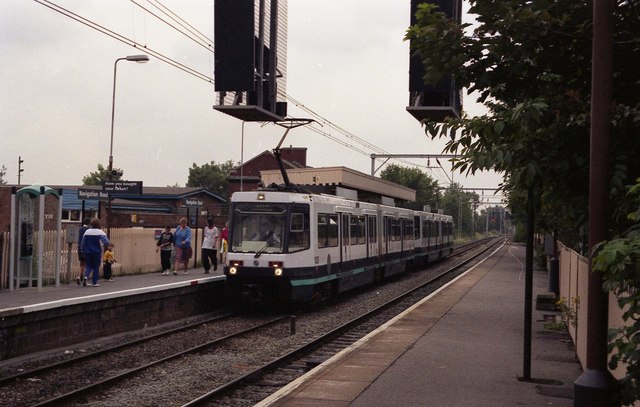
A T-68 tram leaves for Altrincham in 1992, shortly after the station's part conversion to Metrolink

Navigation Road lies in Metrolink fare zone 4 and is served by two lines; the service pattern is:

- Green line: services between Altrincham and Bury, via Manchester Victoria, depart every 12 minutes
- Purple line: services between Altrincham and Piccadilly depart every 12 minutes; evening services extend to Etihad Campus.

=== Buses ===
The station is served by Metroline Manchester routes 285 (anti-clockwise) and 286 (clockwise) every hour between Altrincham Interchange and Timperley.

Preceding station	Manchester Metrolink	Following station
Altrincham Terminus	Altrincham–Bury (peak only)	Timperley towards Bury
Altrincham Terminus	Altrincham–Piccadilly	Timperley towards Piccadilly
Preceding station	National Rail	Following station
Altrincham	Northern Trains; Mid-Cheshire Line	Stockport
