= Timperley tram stop =

Manchester Metrolink tram stop

Timperley
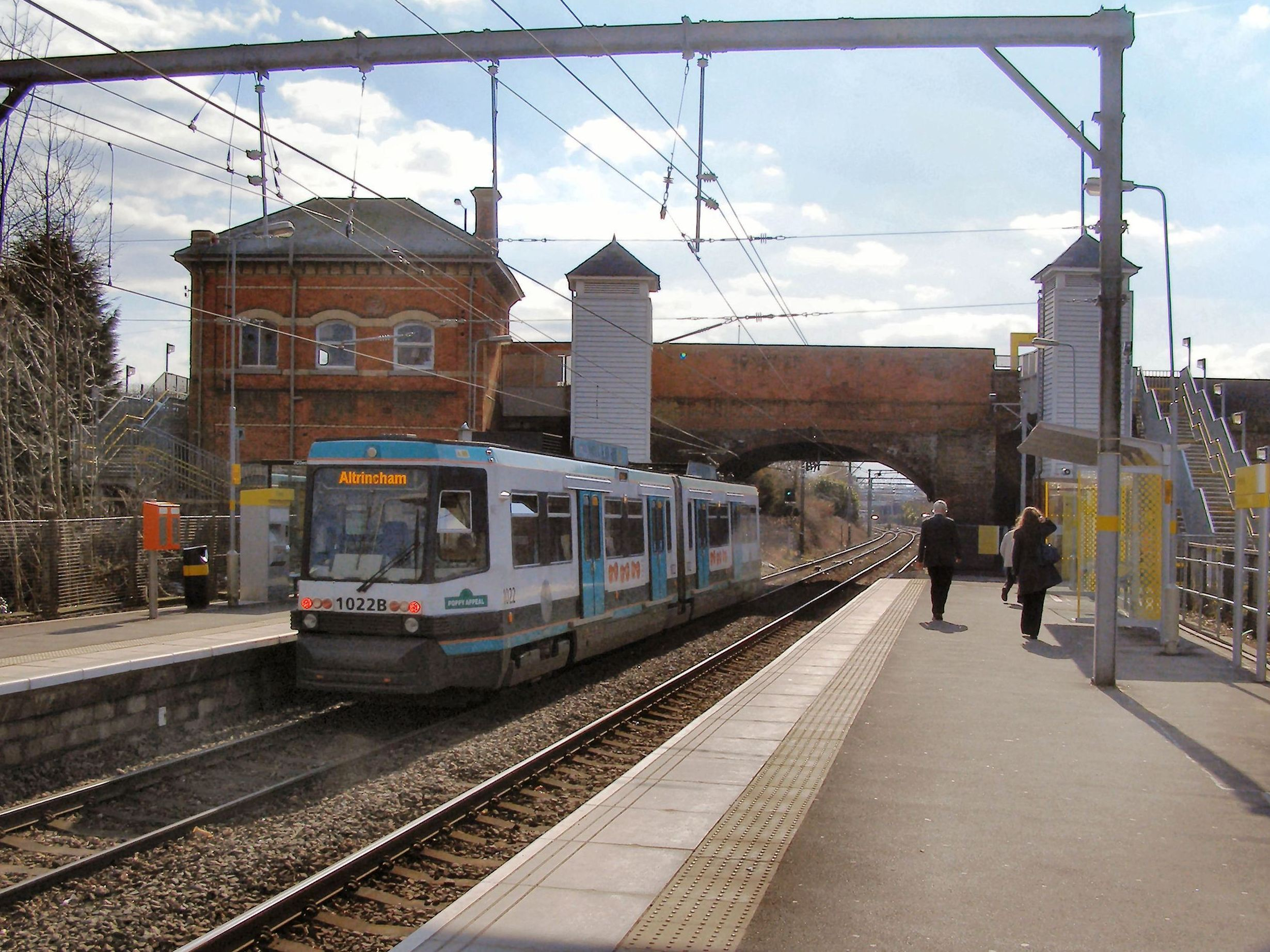
- Timperley tram stop in 2010, looking towards Altrincham

General information
- Location: Timperley,Trafford, England
- Coordinates: 53.40432°N 2.33835°W
- Grid reference: SJ776898
- System: Metrolink station
- Line: Altrincham Line
- Platforms: 2

Other information
- Status: In operation
- Fare zone: 4

History
- Opened: 20 July 1849
- Original company: Manchester South Junction and Altrincham Railway (MSJAR)
- Pre-grouping: MSJAR
- Post-grouping: MSJAR, London Midland Region of British Railways

Key dates
- 24 December 1991: Closed as a rail station
- 15 June 1992: Conversion to Metrolink operation
Route map
Location

Timperley is a tram stop on the Altrincham Line of Greater Manchester's light-rail Metrolink system, in England. Located in western Timperley, about a mile west of the village centre, it opened on 15 June 1992 as part of Phase 1 of Metrolink's expansion. It is located in Metrolink ticket zone 4.

== History ==
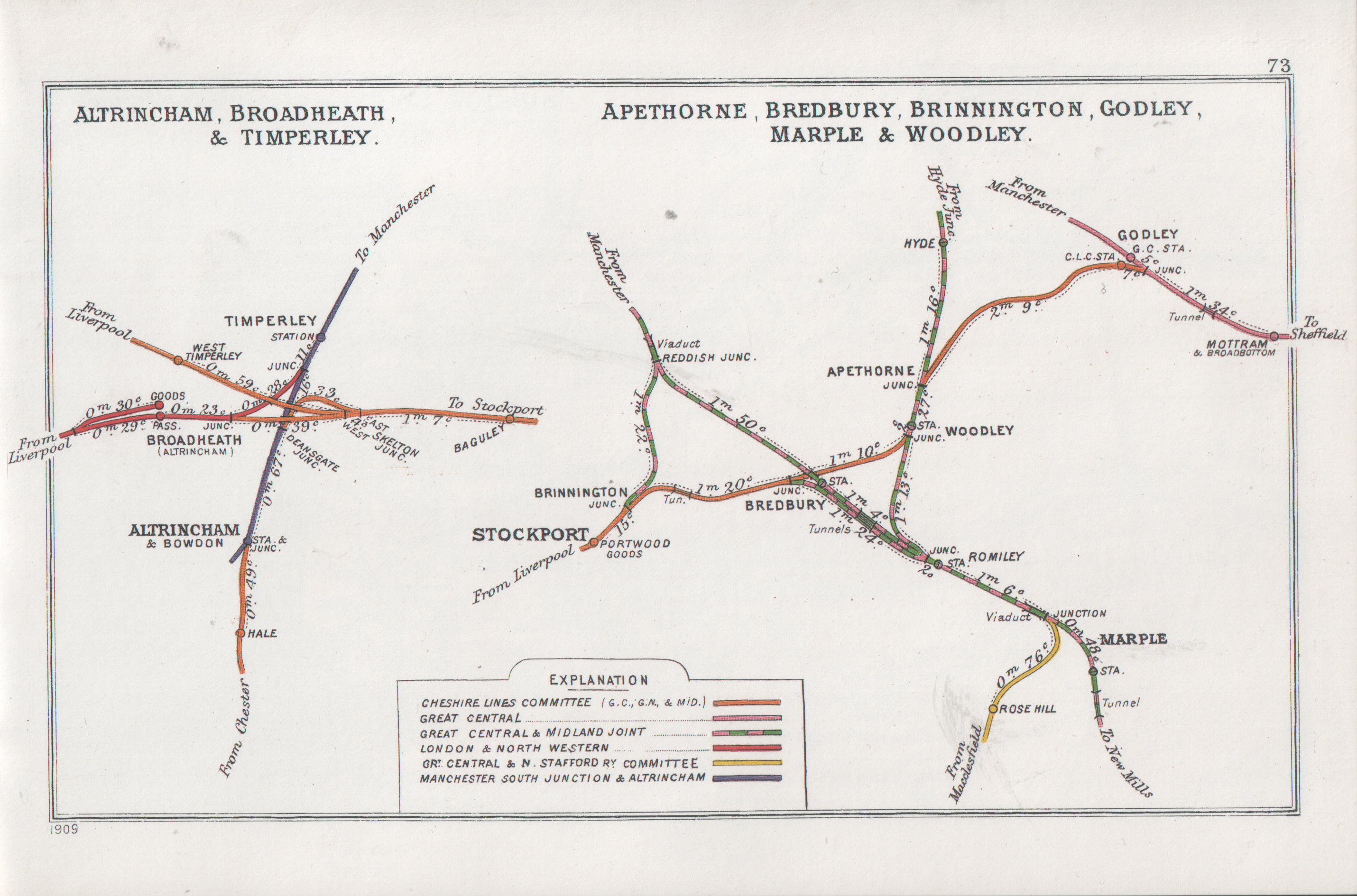
A junction diagram of the area

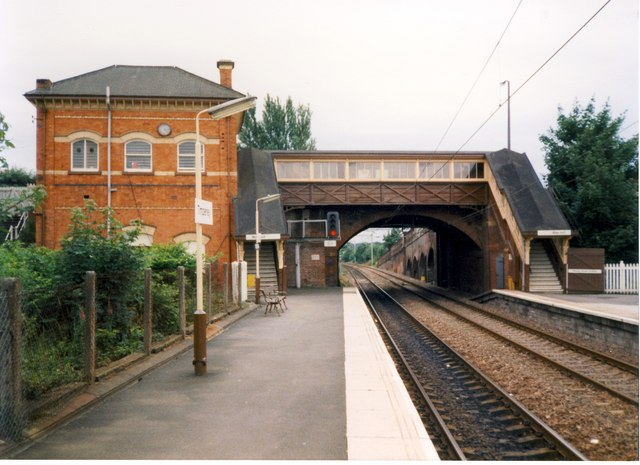
Timperley station in 1988, prior to conversion to Metrolink

The station was opened on 20 July 1849 by the Manchester, South Junction and Altrincham Railway (MSJAR). It closed as a British Rail station on 24 December 1991, to permit conversion of the line, and reopened as a Metrolink station on 15 June 1992.

The canopy on the Manchester-bound platform was demolished in 2009. The former booking office was used as a taxi office for several years up to 2003; it was converted to a coffee shop in 2010.

== Services ==
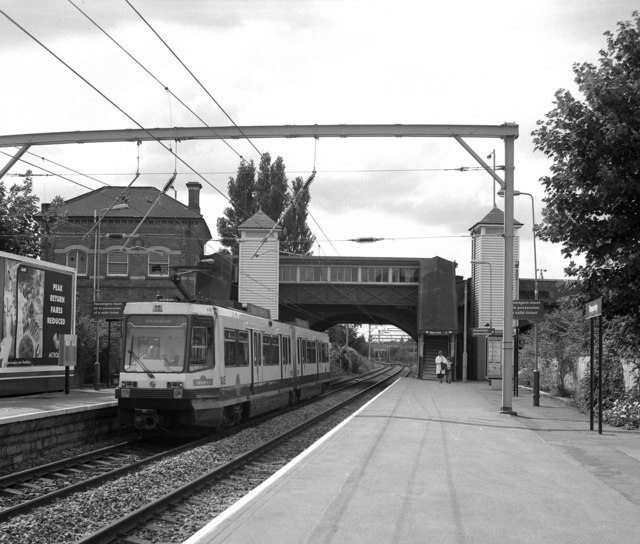
The station in 1993, soon after its conversion to Metrolink

Timperley is served by two tram lines; the service pattern is:

- Green line: services between Altrincham and Bury, via Manchester Victoria, depart every 12 minutes
- Purple line: services between Altrincham and Piccadilly depart every 12 minutes; evening services extend to Etihad Campus.

Preceding station	Manchester Metrolink	Following station
Navigation Road towards Altrincham	Altrincham–Bury (peak only)	Brooklands towards Bury
Navigation Road towards Altrincham	Altrincham–Piccadilly	Brooklands towards Piccadilly
Historical railways
Altrincham (first station); Line open, station closed	Manchester, South Junction and Altrincham Railway	Brooklands; Line and station open
Disused railways
Broadheath (Altrincham); Line and station closed	LNWR; Warrington & Stockport Railway	Brooklands; Line and station open

== Connecting bus routes ==
The station is served by Metroline Manchester route 281 between Altrincham Interchange and Sale.
