= Firema T-68 =

Light rail passenger vehicle

Manchester Metrolink T-68/T-68A
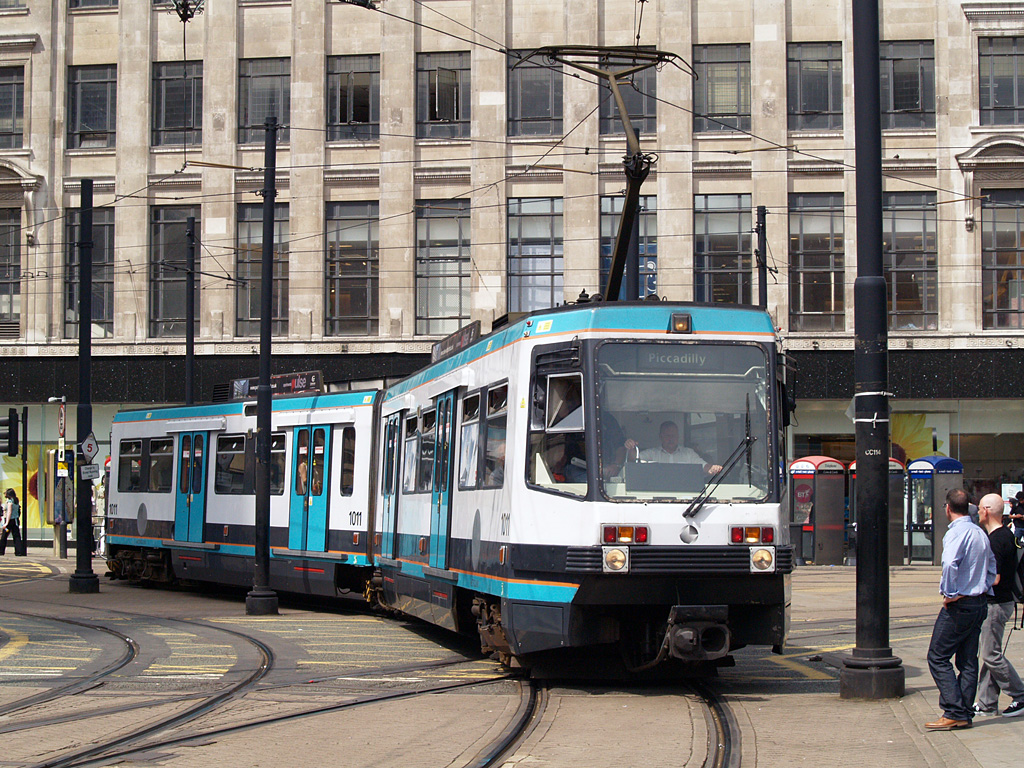
- T-68 1011 in Manchester city centre in 2008

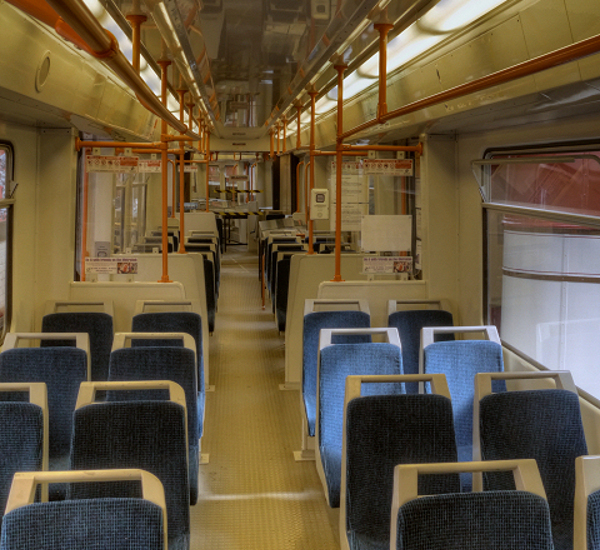
- Interior of the prototype T-68
- In service: T68: 6 April 1992 – 10 February 2014; T68A: 6 December 1999 - 30 April 2014
- Manufacturers: Firema, T68A Firema and Ansaldo
- Built at: Italy
- Constructed: T-68: 1991–1992; T-68A: 1999
- Refurbished: 2007–2010 midlife refurbishment, T-68 gain retractable couplers and covered bogies 2010–2012 reliability modifications, LCD screens, LED lights, driver's cab air conditioning
- Number built: 32 Total (T-68: 26; T-68A: 6)
- Number preserved: 2
- Number scrapped: 27
- Successor: Bombardier M5000
- Formation: 2 carriages
- Fleet numbers: T-68: 1001-1026; T-68A: 2001-2006
- Capacity: 82/4 seats, 122 standing per vehicle
- Operator: Metrolink
- Lines served: Altrincham, Bury, Eccles

Specifications
- Car body construction: Steel
- Car length: 29 m (95 ft 1 3/4 in)
- Width: 2.65 m (8 ft 8 3/8 in)
- Height: 3.7 m (12 ft 1 5/8 in)
- Articulated sections: 2
- Maximum speed: 50 mph (80 km/h)
- Weight: 49 tonnes (48 long tons; 54 short tons) per vehicle.
- Traction system: T-68A: GTO–VVVF
- Traction motors: T-68: 4 × 105 kW (141 hp) separately excited DC motors T-68A: 4 × 120 kW (160 hp) 3–phase AC motors
- Electric systems: 750 V DC OHLE
- Current collection: Brecknell Willis high reach pantograph
- Bogies: 3
- Track gauge: 4 ft 8 1/2 in (1,435 mm) standard gauge

The Firema T-68 is a retired model of light rail passenger vehicle that first operated on the Manchester Metrolink network in Greater Manchester, England in 1992. The vehicles were constructed by Firema specifically as a high-floor, articulated bi-directional tram to operate solely on the Manchester Metrolink system.

Twenty-six T-68s were manufactured by Firema at their factories in Italy. Six modified variants (known as the T-68A) were produced in 1999 in a joint project by Firema and Ansaldo. All 32 were replaced by Bombardier M5000s between 2012 and 2014, as the Bombardier trams were significantly more reliable than the T-68s.

== T-68 ==
The first 26 T-68s were built in 1991 by Firema with bodyshells constructed at various plants in Casaralta (8), Casertane (7), Cittadella (4) and Fiore (7). Bogies and the central articulation sections were constructed at Firema's Padova plant (which was later responsible for the construction of the T68A vehicles). The first T68 to be delivered to Manchester was 1001, arriving 29 August 1991; this was the only T68 to be delivered as a complete unit with the others arriving in separate consignments with each bodyshell and bogies being assembled at Queens Road depot.

The T-68s entered service on 6 April 1992. As low-floor tram technology was in its infancy at the time Metrolink was in its planning stages, and in order to be compatible with standard height railway platforms used by Metrolink, the vehicles were high-floor, using the same 900 mm (35 in) platform height as British Rail trains. In the beginning, several stops in the city centre (High Street, Market Street, Mosley Street and St Peter's Square) had dual height platforms, with one high part and one lower part. For the low height sections, the T-68s were equipped with retractable steps to allow passengers to use them. The dual height platforms have since been either rebuilt as high level platforms (St Peter's Square, Market Street), or removed (Mosley Street, High Street). The T-68s could operate either as single units, or coupled together in pairs.

The fleet later received various modifications, including electronic destination displays instead of destination blinds, retractable couplers, covered bogies, internal electronic displays, CCTV in place of mirrors and several other electronic modifications. Fifteen were later fitted with air-conditioning.

Vehicle 1022 underwent an interior modification layout trial in 1995 that saw non-standard seating fitted with higher backs and more rounded grab handles. The seats were set in a longitudinal layout to provide for more standing passengers and increase the overall capacity. The trial was unpopular with passengers and the tram was later refitted with standard seats in the original layout. The trial seats were retained and in March 2003 were fitted to vehicle 1007.

The final three T-68s: 1007, 1016 and 1022 were withdrawn on 10 February 2014.

== T-68A ==
Ahead of the opening of the Phase 2 line to Eccles Line, six new vehicles were ordered and constructed in 1999. Bodyshells were again built by Firema, this time at the plant in Stanga, Italy. Traction equipment was built by Ansaldo at the Padova facility, where assembly of the vehicles was completed.

The six T-68As entered service on the Eccles Line at its opening in 1999, numbered 2001–2006. They were similar to the original fleet, but built with modifications to allow for a high proportion of street running on the Eccles Line with other traffic. These included retractable couplers and covered bogies, as well as electronic destination displays instead of destination blinds. Three of the original fleet (1005, 1010 and 1015) also received the same modifications to allow them to run alongside the new T-68As. Subsequently, all but 1018 - 1020 were similarly modified. Originally, the T-68As were only authorised to run between Eccles, Piccadilly and the Queens Road depot, but from 2009 they were modified to allow running on all lines. The T-68A trams only ever operated as single units.

After developing a fault with the emergency brakes applying regularly without instruction to do so, 2001 was stored for several years from 2006. It was completely rewired and returned to service in June 2011. The final two T-68As, 2001 and 2003, were withdrawn on 30 April 2014.

== Livery ==
The trams were originally liveried in white, with a grey skirt, and a turquoise strip running along the skirt. Later modifications of this livery included the doors also being painted turquoise, and a turquoise strip painted along the top of the body, with thin orange or yellow lines separating the turquoise stripes and the white body. Only 1003 received the yellow and grey Metrolink livery introduced when the first M5000s entered service.

== Names ==
Naming of the T68s was carried out regularly from the fleets inception in 1992, usually applied in vinyl on the cab sides as advertisements for sponsors or carrying the names of notable people. Examples include "The Robert Owen" carried by both 1003 and 1004 and "The Eric Black" carried by 1019 throughout its time in service. Throughout the fleets life a total of 90 names were applied to 31 of the 32 T68 and T68As, with 1023 never having received a name throughout its time in service.

== Withdrawal ==
In 2008, the entire T-68/T-68A fleet underwent a refurbishment programme, which was designed to keep them in service for at least another 10 years. However, the newer Bombardier M5000 trams introduced from 2009 proved to be considerably more reliable than the T-68/T-68A fleet, which averaged 5,000 miles (8,000 km) between breakdowns, while the M5000 trams at introduction averaged 20,000 miles (32,000 km). The M5000 trams are also 10 tonnes lighter than the T-68s/T-68As, causing less track wear, and using less energy. In addition to this, many of the T-68s were found to be suffering from corrosion to their solebars, which would have required further expensive repairs to keep them in service.

In July 2012, Transport for Greater Manchester decided that it would be more cost effective to withdraw all of the T-68s/T-68As and replace them with M5000s with the first T-68 withdrawn in 2012. The final three T68s were withdrawn on 10 February 2014 and the last two T-68As on 30 April 2014.

To bid farewell to the T-68s, on 26 May 2014 a farewell tour was operated by 1007 and 1016, the former being the first tram to run through the city streets when it opened in 1992.

== Preservation and further use ==
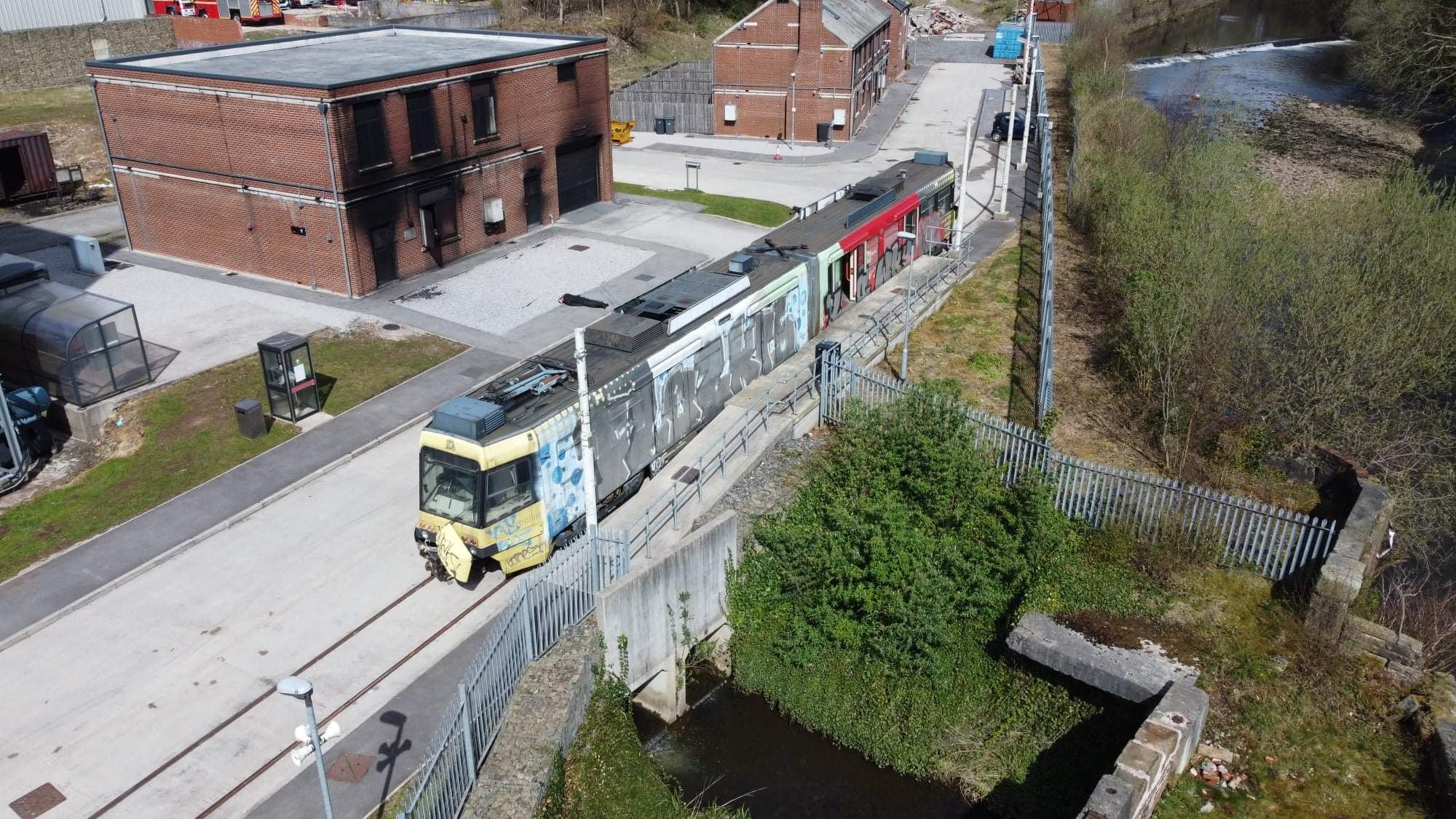
T-68 1003 Greater Manchester Fire and Rescue training facility

The Heaton Park Tramway owns T-68 1007, being chosen as it was the first tram to run through Manchester city centre on the system's opening on 27 April 1992 and sharing a number with the last Manchester Corporation Tramways service in 1949. It is destined for the Heaton Park Tramway but remains at Metrolink's Trafford Depot until it can be accommodated. 1023 remains under the ownership of Transport for Greater Manchester and moved to Crewe Heritage Centre in March 2020.

Greater Manchester Fire and Rescue Service purchased 1003 for use as a training rig at its training facility in Bury.

Four of the trams (1016, 1022, 1024 and 1026) were transferred to the tram test centre at Long Marston. 1016 was scrapped in June 2021 followed by 1024 in August 2022.

A single car prototype bodyshell numbered 1000 was built in Italy in 1990 and delivered to Manchester for public exhibition to promote the system. It is now preserved and displayed at the Museum of Transport, Greater Manchester.

== In popular culture ==
In December 2010, T-68 1015 was used in the 50th anniversary live episode of the television programme Coronation Street, to portray a tram crash on the street. As well as a mock-up tram for scenes after the crash, real life T-68 1015 was also used, numbered as 1030 and temporarily vinyl wrapped in the new yellow and grey livery. Trams 1019 and 2001 appeared in the 2001 comedy drama The Parole Officer starring Steve Coogan but the lengthy scene featuring 1019 was eventually cut.

== Accidents and incidents ==
- In March 1992, tram 1013 derailed on the point-work on the approach to Platform B at Victoria station during trial running, prior to opening. No serious damage was suffered by the LRV and it re-entered trial running shortly afterwards.
- In April 1994, tram 1003 was damaged in an accident at Piccadilly. The LRV was moved to Metro-Camell Works in Washwood Heath for repairs. The LRV returned to Manchester and re-entered service in December 1994.
- On 6 December 1994, tram 1017 derailed in the vicinity of Collyhurst tunnel running empty from Queens Road.
- On 12 August 1996, tram 1006 was involved in a collision with a HGV which had gone through a red traffic light on Corporation Street, near Victoria station. The force of the impact derailed the B car of the tram but there were no serious injuries to the driver or passengers. The damaged carriage was repaired at Metro-Cammell Works in Washwood Heath, with the tram returning to service just over four months later, on 16 December 1996.
- In October 1999, tram 1002 was involved in a collision at Piccadilly, which resulted in one half of the unit being sent to Metro-Cammell Works in Washwood Heath for repairs. The LRV returned to service in mid-January 2000.
- On 4 December 2000, tram 2002 was involved in a collision whilst working a service on the Salford Quays section. Repairs to the LRV took over a fortnight to complete, returning to service on 18 December 2000.
- On 13 December 2000, tram 1015 was involved in a collision on Corporation Street. Repairs took almost two months to complete, with the LRV returning to service on 2 February 2001.
- On 15 December 2001, tram 1023 was involved in a serious collision with a bus whilst crossing over Princess Street. The cab of 1023 was extensively damaged, which resulted in the LRV being sent to Crewe Works for repairs to the cab structure and other damaged bodywork. The damaged "B" end of 1023 left Manchester on 19 December 2001 and returned on 7 February 2002. 1023 finally re-entered service on 27 February 2002.
- On 9 January 2002, tram 1003 derailed at Victoria station after striking an object on the track. The LRV suffered no serious damage was it returned to service a few days later.
- On 31 August 2004, tram 1015 derailed at Shudehill. It was returned to Queens Road Depot for repairs.
- On 26 September 2004, tram 2005 was involved in a serious collision with a refuse wagon which struck the "B" end of the LRV, derailing the unit in the process. The damaged "B" end was sent to Crewe Works for repair on 8 December 2004, returning to Manchester on 15 April 2005.
- On 17 December 2004, The pantograph of tram 1024 brought down the overhead wires between Prestwich and Heaton Park. This was caused by the detachment of part of the carbon strip fitted to the pantograph head.
- On 11 January 2005, tram 1015 derailed on the approach to Piccadilly station. The middle bogie had derailed, colliding with an overhead line stanchion, damaging the doors and bodywork.
- On 8 September 2005, tram 1014 suffered a minor cab fire whilst at Piccadilly Gardens. The LRV was returned to Queens Road Depot for repairs to take place with wiring and damaged cab components.
- On 18 October 2005, tram 1002 was involved in a serious collision with a lorry crossing Corporation Street resulting in extensive damage, derailing the LRV in the process. The unit was sent to Crewe Works on 30 November 2005 for repair, returning on 17 March 2006. The LRV re-entered service on 30 May 2006.
- On 10 November 2005, the pantograph of tram 1022 detached while in service. Investigations found that a brick, which had been thrown at the tram from a bridge on the Bury Line, jammed underneath the pantograph and caused it to detach as it retracted to match lower overhead wires outside of the city centre.
- On 17 November 2005, tram 1007 was involved in a collision with the buffer stops at Piccadilly Undercroft, resulting in underframe damage. The LRV was sent to Crewe Works for repairs, departing on 18 January 2006 and returning on 2 March 2006. The LRV re-entered service on 24 April 2006.
- On 22 March 2006, tram 1011 derailed as it entered a section of street running at Long Millgate near Victoria station. There were no injuries nor damage caused. The derailment was attributed to the failure of a repaired section of track at the interface between on- and off-street running.
- On 17 January 2007, tram 1005 derailed on a curve at Pomona station. The RAIB concluded this was due to insufficient maintenance of the tracks by the contracted operator, Serco, which led to the tracks slowly moving apart until they were out of gauge.
- On 1 February 2007, tram 1013 split a set of points while being moved at Queens Road depot. This caused the tram to end up diagonally, across two tracks. None of the bogies were derailed in the incident.
- On 29 June 2008, tram 1016 derailed as the rear vehicle of a double consist while crossing Princess Street near St Peter's Square. The derailment was attributed to insufficient maintenance by the previous operator, Serco. Damage was caused to tram 1016 as well as the overhead line at the point of the derailment. Tram 1008, the other vehicle, was not damaged in the incident.
- On 1 November 2008, tram 1001 was involved in a serious collision with a bus on Mosley Street. The LRV spent four months out of service, undergoing repair. The unit performed a test run on 13 March 2009, in advance to returning to service.
- On 8 June 2009, tram 1010 derailed on the ramp at G-Mex (now Deansgate-Castlefield). The damage was minor and the LRV was quickly returned to service.
- On 5 June 2011, tram 1002 struck a pedestrian on Piccadilly Gardens. The person walked into the path of 1002 and was struck at 9 mph (14 km/h). The person died at the Manchester Royal Infirmary.
- On 7 June 2011, tram 1021 derailed upon leaving Market Street tram stop, with the LRV`s leading bogie derailed on point-work. Although damage was minimal, the LRV was taken out of service on its return to Queens Road for repairs and the fitting of cab air-conditioning units, re entering service eight weeks later.
- On 3 April 2013, tram 2006 suffered a minor heating cable fire at Exchange Quay. After detraining passengers, 2006 returned to Queens Road. The LRV never returned to service as the impending withdrawal of the T68A LRV's meant that repairs were not authorised and it became the first T68A to be withdrawn on 4 April 2013.
- On 8 June 2013, tram 1016 was involved in a collision with a taxi on Nicholas Street, suffering damage to the coupler and fender. The LRV was repaired using parts from soon-to-be-withdrawn 1014.

== Gallery ==
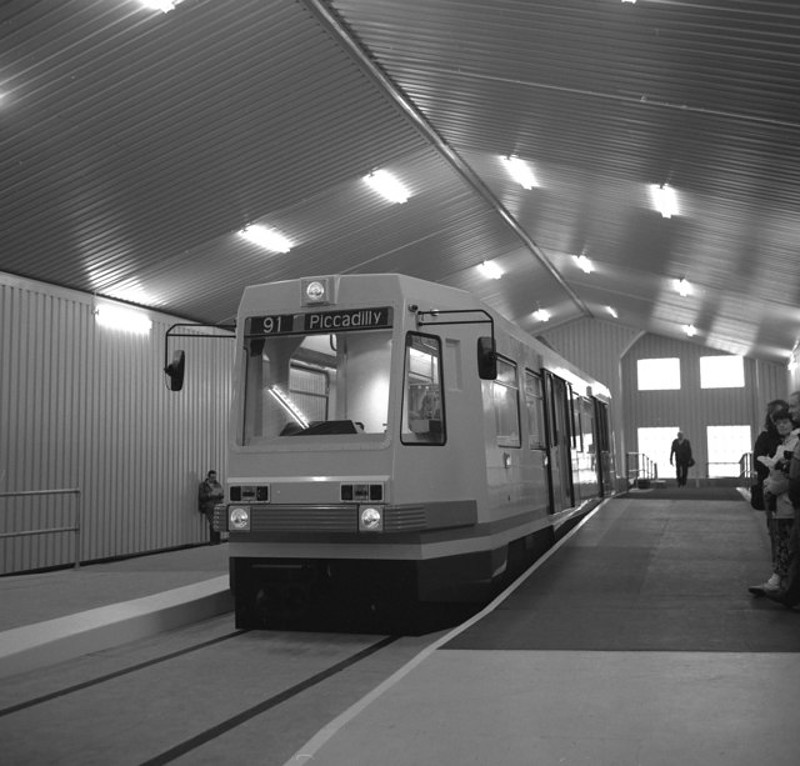
Pre-production bodyshell mock-up, on display to the public in 1990. Now displayed at the Museum of Transport, Greater Manchester.

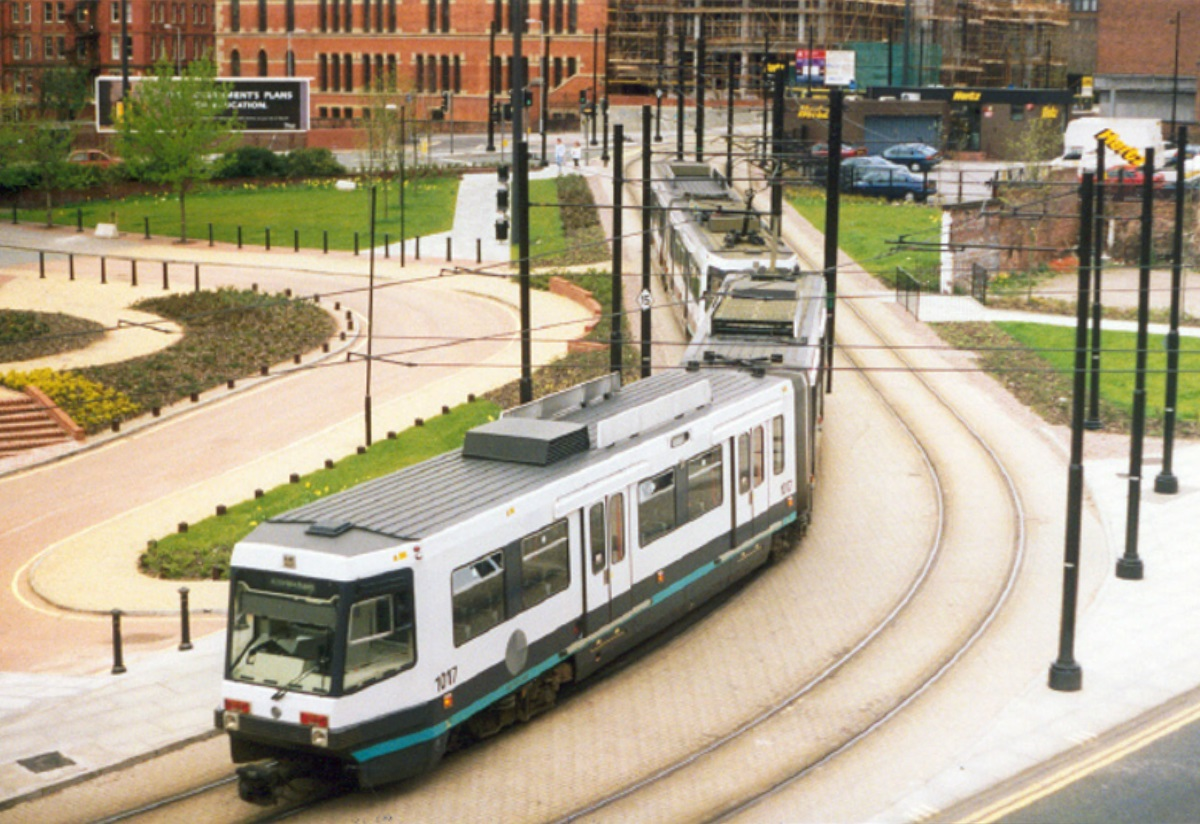
A pair of coupled T-68s, in the earliest version of the livery near Piccadilly station in 1994.

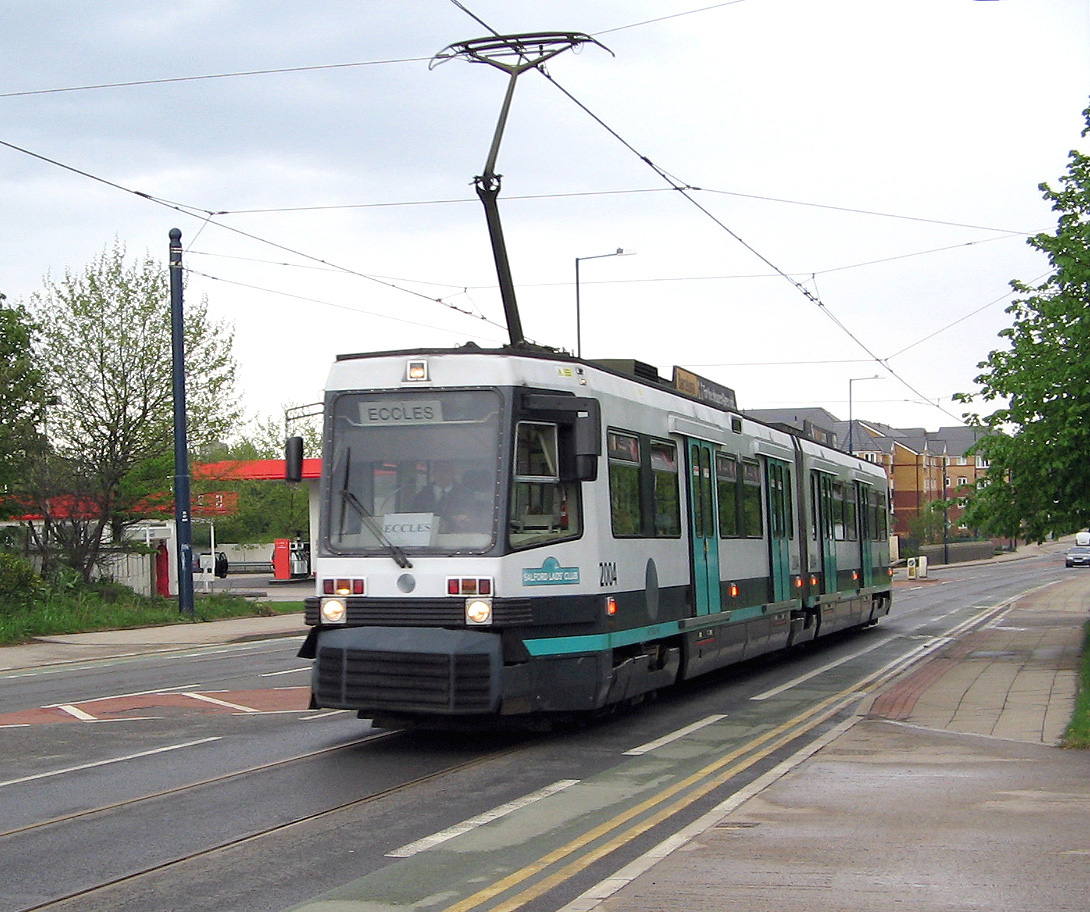
T-68A tram no. 2004 in Eccles, in 2005.

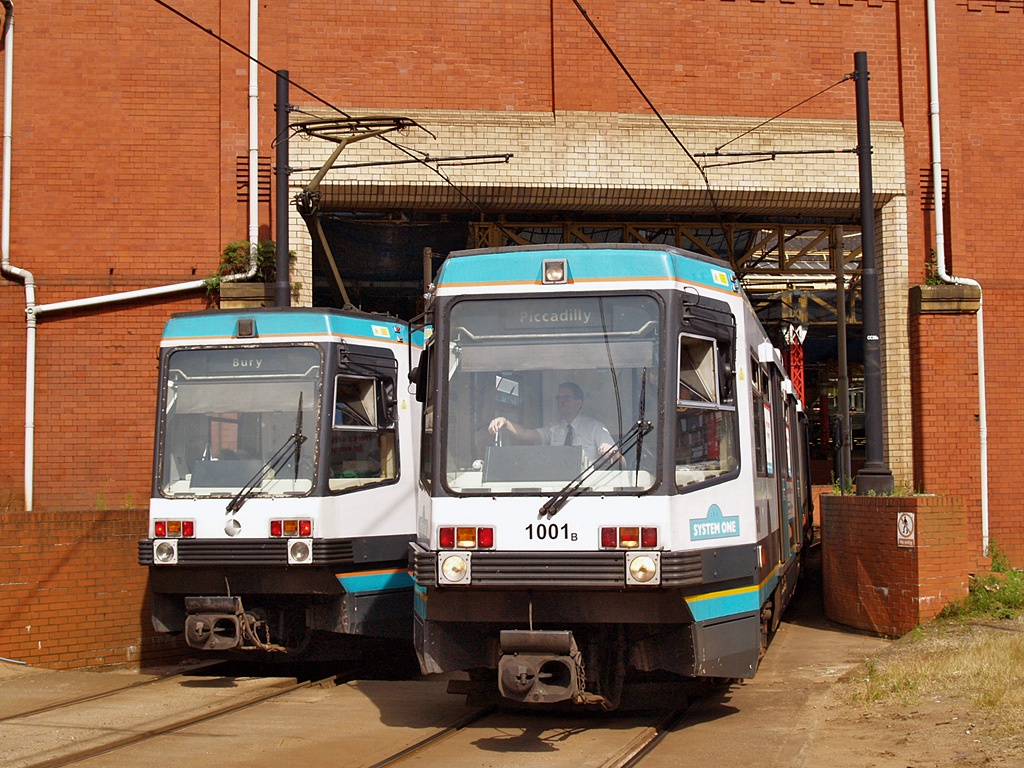
Two T68s at the entrance to Victoria station in 2008.

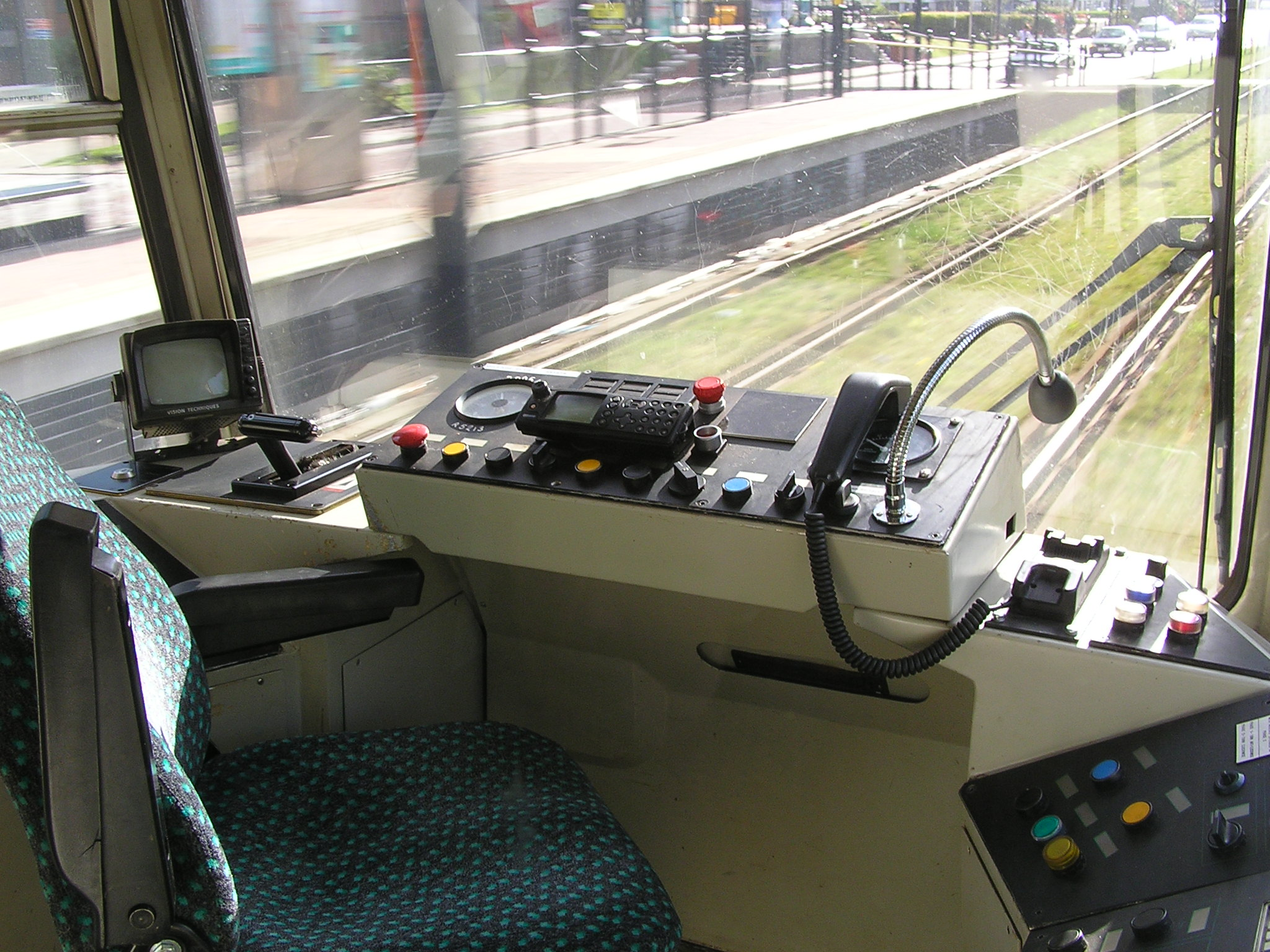
Driver's cab of T-68 tram.

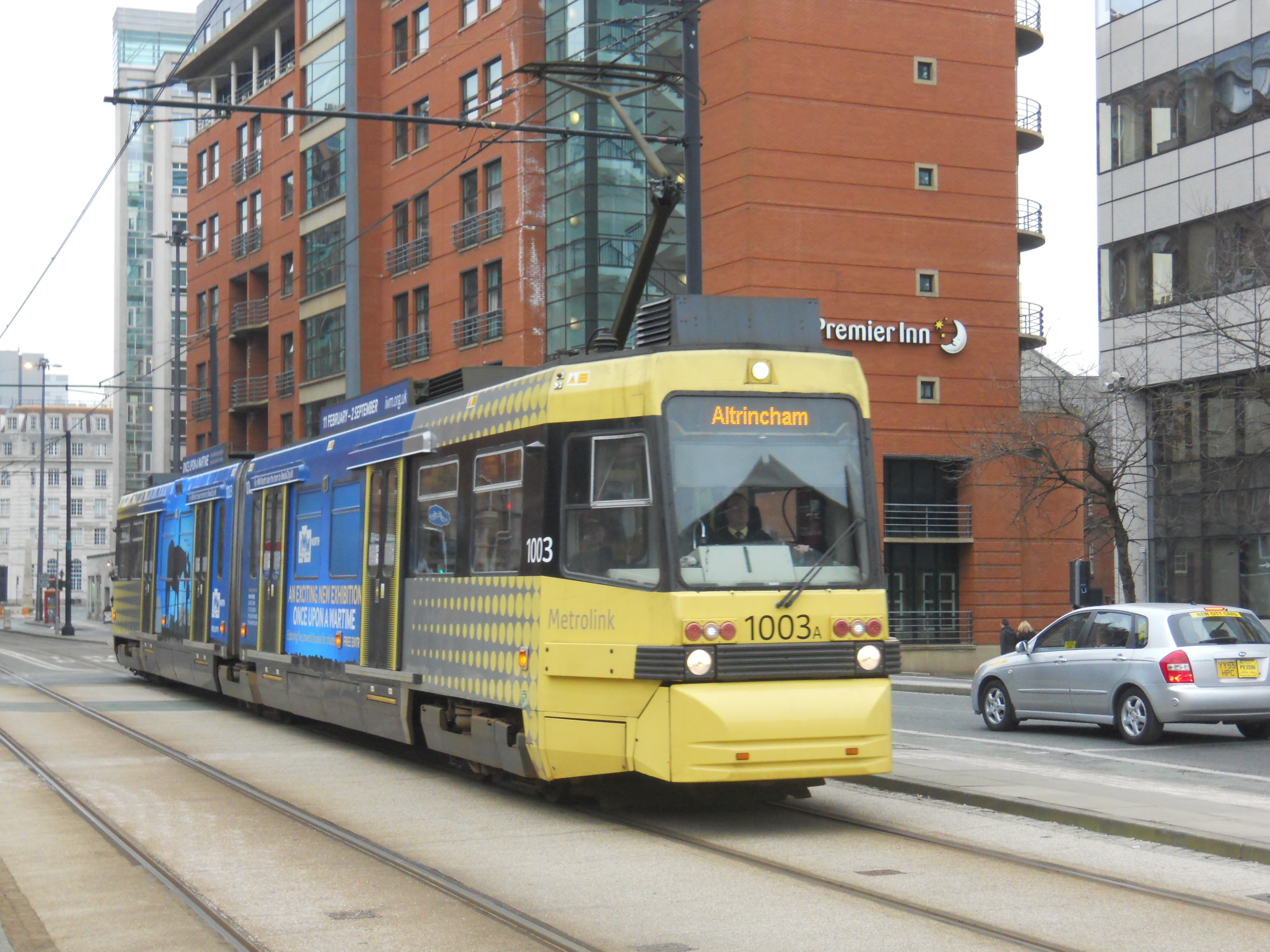
T-68 1003 in Metrolink yellow livery in February 2012.

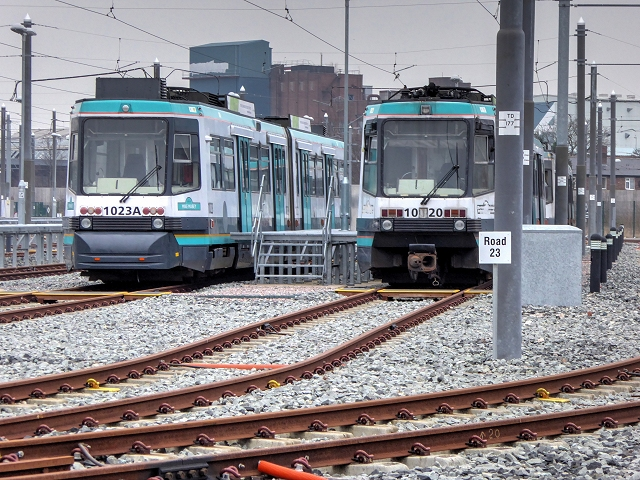
Withdrawn T-68s at Trafford depot, 2015.
