= Altrincham Line =

Manchester Metrolink line

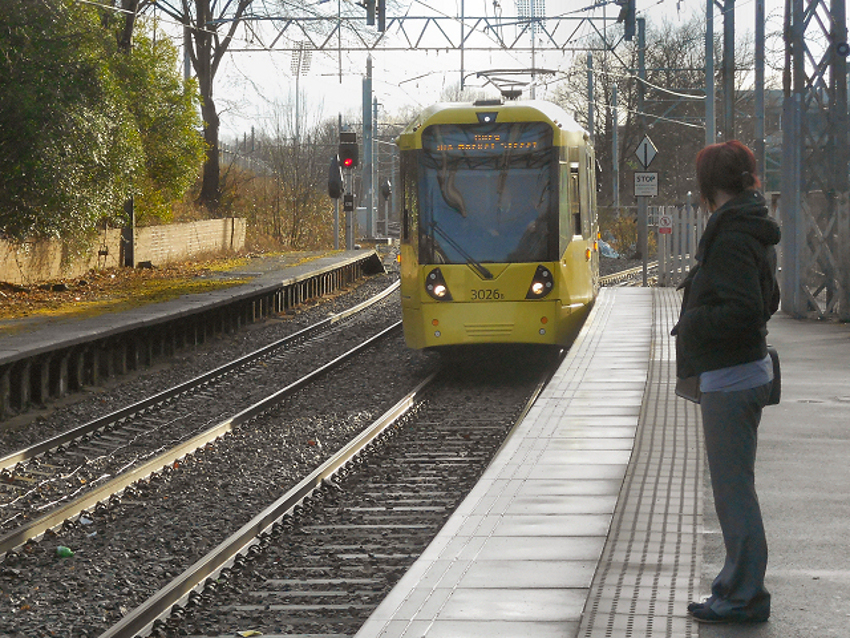
- An M5000 on a service to Bury approaching Trafford Bar.

Overview
- Locale: Manchester; Altrincham
- Termini: Deansgate-Castlefield; Altrincham Interchange
- Stations: 11

Service
- Type: Tram/Light rail
- System: Manchester Metrolink
- Rolling stock: Bombardier M5000 (2009-Present); AnsaldoBreda T-68/T68A (1992-2014)

History
- Opened: 15 June 1992

Technical
- Line length: 7.6 miles (12.2 km)
- Character: Converted railway line
- Track gauge: 4 ft 8 1/2 in (1,435 mm) standard gauge
- Electrification: 750 volts DC overhead
- Operating speed: 50 mph (80km/h)

The Altrincham Line is a tram line of the Manchester Metrolink running from Manchester to Altrincham in Greater Manchester. Originally a railway line, it was, along with the Bury Line, converted into a tramway during 1991–92, as part of the first phase of the Metrolink system.

== Route ==
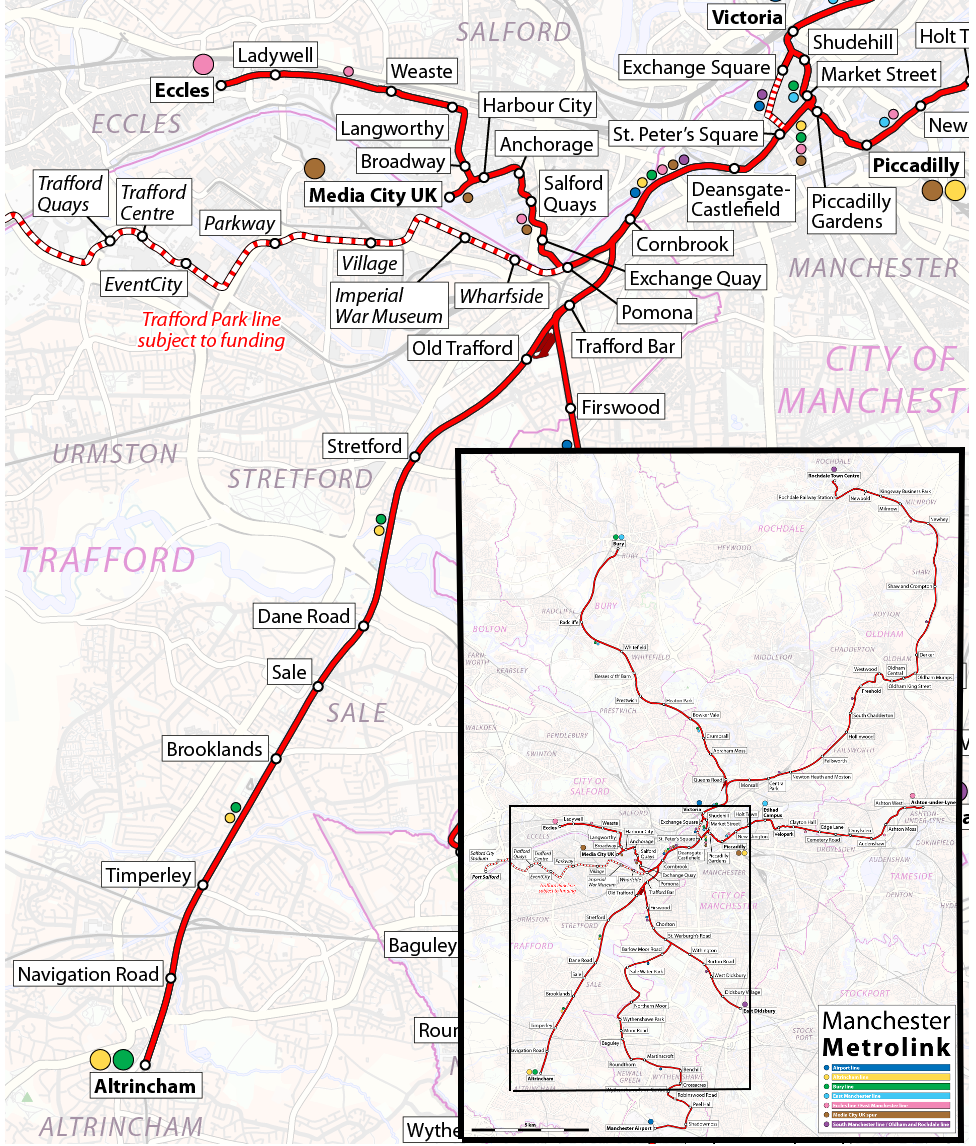
Route map.

The line runs south-west from Manchester city centre, rising from a ramp which takes the tracks onto the streets of central Manchester, just east of Deansgate-Castlefield stop, and then runs along a former railway viaduct, parallel to the heavy rail Manchester to Warrington and Liverpool line as far as Cornbrook; just west of which the Eccles Line diverges to the north-west, and the Altrincham line runs south-west under the railway through an underpass. Cornbook stop was opened in 1999 as an interchange stop between the Altrincham and Eccles lines. The line then runs south-west along the former MSJ&AR line, and connects the towns of Stretford and Sale before running to Altrincham. The line uses old railway lines converted to light-rail operation, and has no street-running sections.

On the stretch between Timperley, and the terminus at Altrincham, the alignment is shared with the Network Rail Mid-Cheshire Line: There are two tracks; the tram line uses one track, and the railway uses the other, both operating as bi-directional single track lines. Both Navigation Road station, and Altrincham Interchange are shared tram/train interchange stations.

== History ==
=== Pre-Metrolink ===
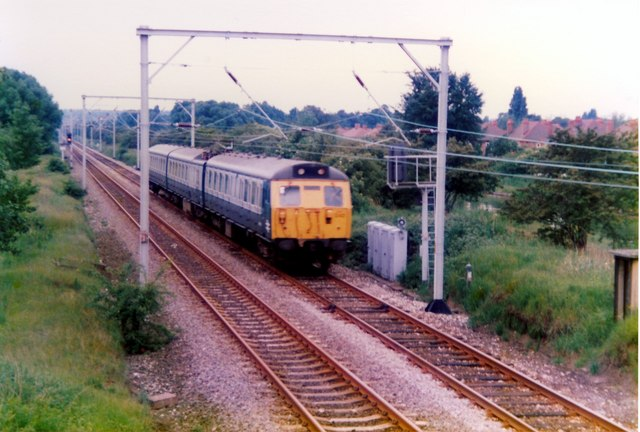
The Altrincham line prior to Metrolink, being operated by a Class 304 unit near Sale in 1989.

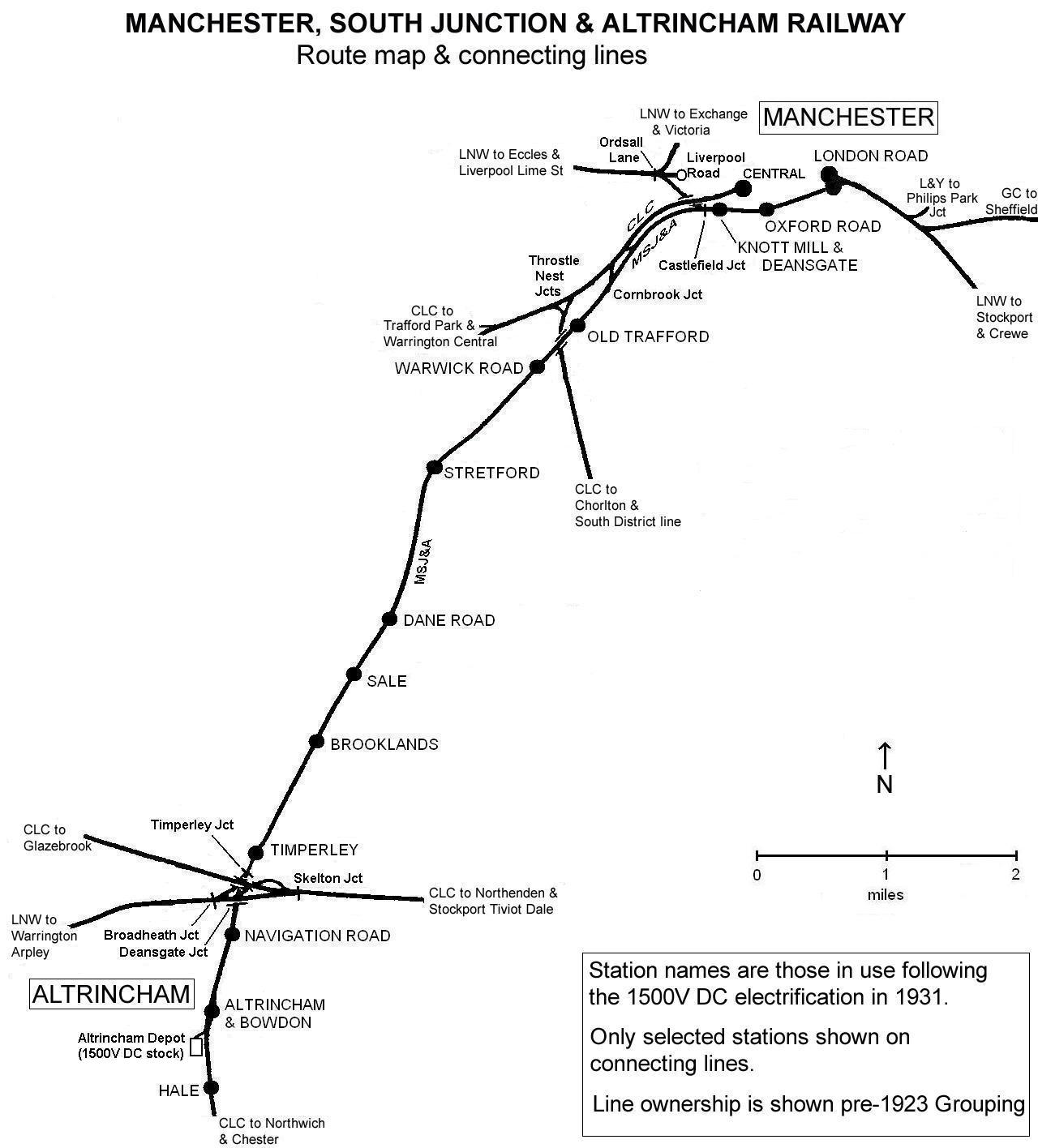
Map of the original MSJAR.

The line was originally a railway: The Manchester South Junction and Altrincham Railway (MSJ&AR) which was opened in 1849, and ran between Altrincham and London Road Station (now Piccadilly) in Manchester. With some trains running into Manchester Central via a connection at Cornbrook.

In response to competition from trams, which were taking away business from the railway, the line was electrified between London Road and Altrincham in 1931 using the 1,500 volt DC overhead system.

In 1958, services were cut back to terminate at Manchester Oxford Road, as the line between Oxford Road and the recently renamed Piccadilly station had been re-electrified at 25 kV AC. By the late 1960s the original 1,500 V DC system had become non-standard, and both the overhead line equipment and the electric rolling stock had reached the end of their working lives, it was clear they would need replacement: In 1971 British Rail converted the line to operate at the now-standard 25 kV AC system, and replaced the 40-year old rolling stock with newer Class 304 EMUs, which operated the line for the next 20 years until the line was converted to Metrolink operation in 1991.

=== Conversion to Metrolink ===
The Altrincham line was identified by transport planners in the 1980s, as one of the local railway lines in the Greater Manchester area, which could be split off from the main line network and converted to light-rail operation. It was chosen for conversion as part of the first phase of the Metrolink, along with the Manchester Victoria to Bury Line to the north of Manchester: The two previously unconnected lines were to be linked together by a new street-running line across Manchester city-centre, which included a branch to Manchester Piccadilly railway station.

The last heavy rail service ran on the Altrincham line on 24 December 1991, in order for the conversion to light rail to begin. The conversion process involved converting the overhead electrification to work at the tramway standard of 750 volts DC, and refurbishing the stations to improve access for the disabled etc. Several stations were renamed: the former Old Trafford became Trafford Bar, while Warwick Road became Old Trafford.

Also, a number of works were carried out in order to separate the line from the heavy rail network:

- The former Cheshire Lines Committee viaduct which had run from Cornbrook into the former Manchester Central station, and had been disused since 1969; was repaired and brought back into use; however instead of running into the former Central station as the railway had done, the tracks were carried down into the streets by a new ramp just east of the former station. A new stop, originally known as G-Mex, but now known as Deansgate-Castlefield, was constructed alongside the former Central station.
- British Rail built a new underpass at Cornbrook, in order for the tram line to pass under the Manchester to Warrington and Liverpool line, which the railway had previously connected to at the level. Thus taking the tramway from the former CLC viaduct and onto the former MSJ&AR route.
- On the southernmost section, between Timperley and Altrincham, British Rail remodelled the layout during 1991, in order to separate the Metrolink line from the heavy rail Mid-Cheshire Line, which also ran into Altrincham. The two track alignment was separated, so one track was used for trams, and the other by trains, both operating bi-directionally. Mid-Cheshire Line trains which had previously used the Altrincham line into Manchester were then diverted via Stockport.

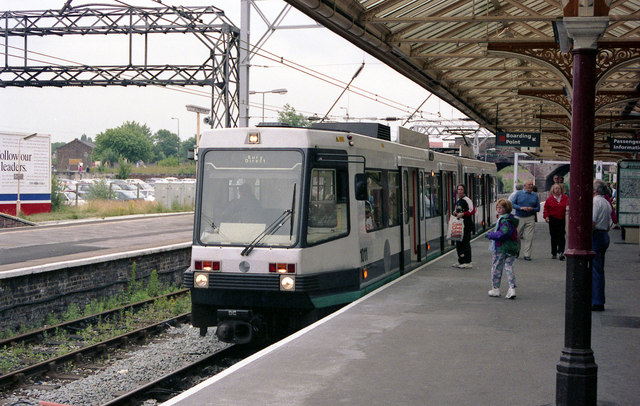
A T-68 tram at Altrincham station in 1992, shortly after the line was opened to trams.

Phase one of the Metrolink opened in stages during 1992; from Bury to Victoria on 6 April 1992; the street running section from Victoria to G-Mex (now Deansgate–Castlefield) on 27 April; Deansgate–Castlefield to Altrincham on 15 June; then the branch to Piccadilly Railway station on 20 July.

== Services ==
Service patterns have varied over the years, however as of February 2017, during Monday to Saturday daytimes a tram operates every six minutes between Altrincham and Manchester, alternating between terminating at Etihad Campus (via Piccadilly) or Bury. During the evenings, and on Sundays and bank holidays the frequency drops to 12 minutes and only run to Etihad Campus.

=== Rolling stock ===
All services are operated by M5000 trams. Between 1992 and 2009, the line was operated by the original fleet of 26 T-68 trams. From 2009 the new fleet of M5000 trams was introduced, and these replaced the original T-68 trams. which were withdrawn from service during 2012–14.
