= Altrincham Interchange =

Transport hub in Trafford, Greater Manchester, England

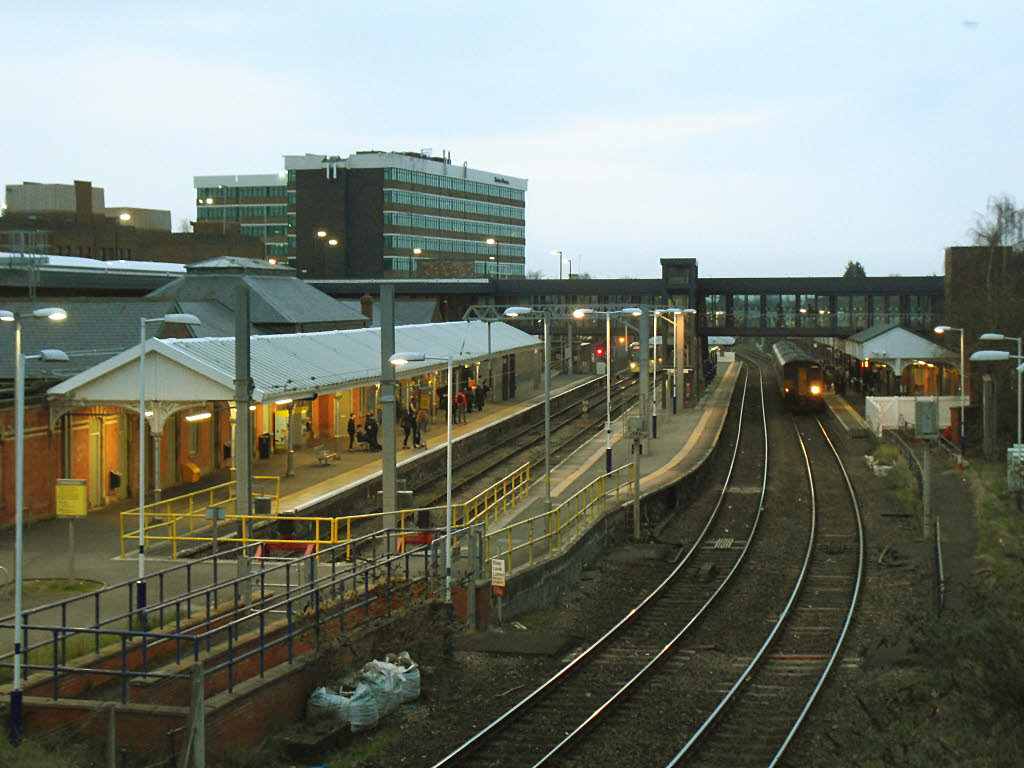
- Railway section of Altrincham Interchange (trams on the left, trains on the right)

General information
- Location: Altrincham, Metropolitan Borough of Trafford, England
- Coordinates: 53.3875°N 2.3472°W
- Grid reference: SJ770879
- Manager: Bee Network
- Transit authority: Transport for Greater Manchester
- Platforms: 4 (2 National Rail, 2 Metrolink)

Other information
- Station code: ALT
- Fare zone: G
- Classification: DfT category C2

Key dates
- 20 July 1849: Original Manchester, South Junction and Altrincham Railway (MSJAR) railway station opens as Altrincham and Bowdon
- 3 April 1881: MSJAR station replaced on current site
- 6 May 1974: Name changed to Altrincham
- 15 June 1992: Manchester Metrolink service starts
- 7 December 2014: Redeveloped interchange opened
- 5 January 2025: The interchange joins the Bee Network

Passengers
- 2020/21: ▼69,168
- 2021/22: ▲0.222 million
- 2022/23: ▲0.248 million
- 2023/24: ▲0.273 million
- 2024/25: ▲0.316 million
Location
Notes
- Passenger statistics from the Office of Rail and Road

Altrincham Interchange is a transport hub in Altrincham, Greater Manchester, England; it is owned and managed by the Bee Network. It consists of a bus station on Stamford New Road, a Northern Trains-operated heavy rail station on the Mid-Cheshire Line, and a light rail stop which forms the south-western terminus of two Manchester Metrolink lines. The original heavy rail element of the station was opened by the Manchester, South Junction and Altrincham Railway (MSJAR) as Altrincham and Bowdon in April 1881, changing to Altrincham in May 1974. The Metrolink element opened in June 1992. The interchange underwent a complete redevelopment in 2013/14. It joined the Bee Network on 5 January 2025; the trains running through the station will join by 2030.

== History ==
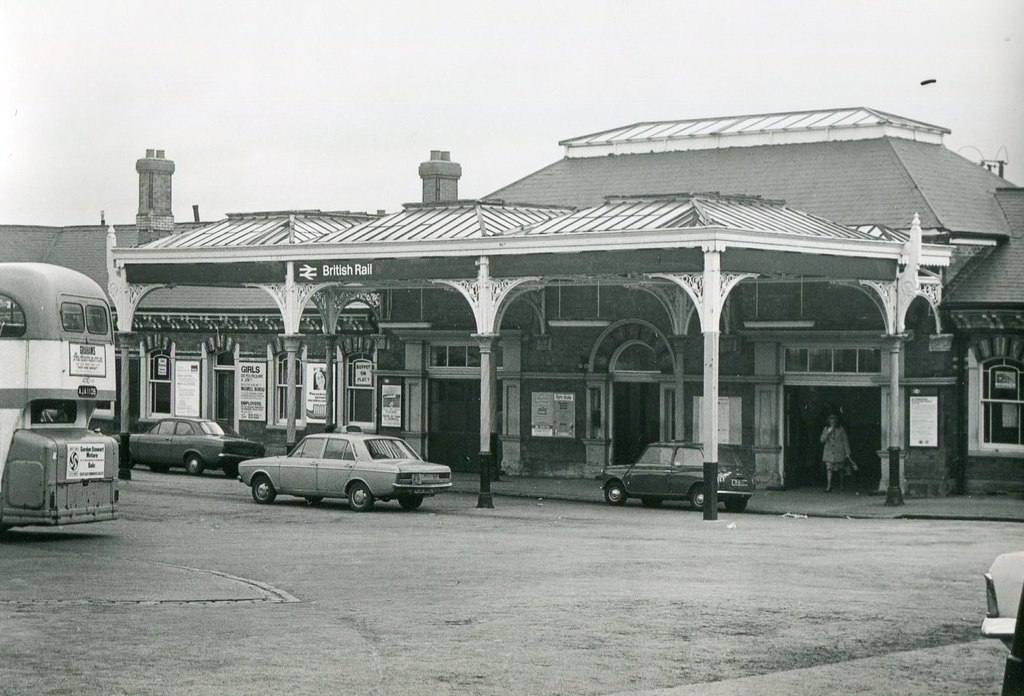
The station entrance in 1975, before the introduction of the bus station

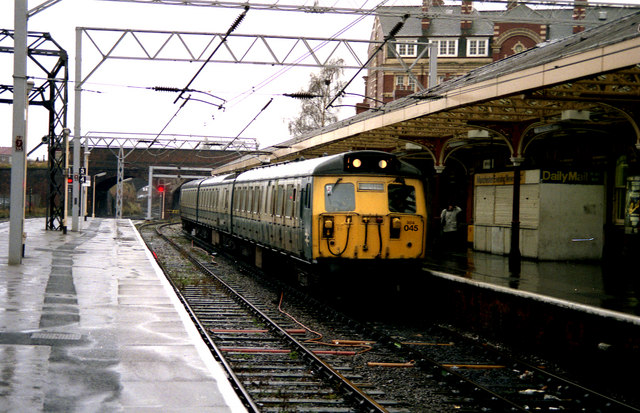
A Class 304 electric multiple unit at the station c.1990

The station was opened on 3 April 1881 as Altrincham & Bowdon by the Manchester, South Junction and Altrincham Railway (MSJAR) to replace the first Altrincham station on Stockport Road and Bowdon on Lloyd Street/Railway Street, which both closed that day. All platforms were through, with 1 and 2 (nearest to the town) being used by the MSJAR.

The Cheshire Lines Committee (CLC) trains from Manchester Central to Northwich and Chester Northgate used platforms 3 and 4. It also operated a service from Stockport Tiviot Dale to Altrincham, via Northenden, latterly using Sentinel steam railcars; this service ceased in late 1939.

The station became part of the London, Midland and Scottish Railway during the Grouping of 1923. The station then passed on to the London Midland Region of British Railways on nationalisation in 1948.

Since 6 May 1974, the station has been named simply Altrincham. In 1975, a new booking office was opened on platform 4 to serve the car park on the site of the former goods yard; work also began to convert the former station forecourt on Stamford New Road into a bus station and the Victorian glass-covered canopy over the station entrance was demolished. The new combined bus and railway station, Altrincham Interchange, was opened in November 1976.

When British Rail introduced sectorisation in the 1980s, the station was served by Regional Railways under arrangement with the Greater Manchester Passenger Transport Executive (GMPTE) until the privatisation of British Rail.

Regional Railways' electric multiple units between Manchester and Altrincham ceased serving the station on 24 December 1991. The electrified lines alongside platforms 1 and 2 were reopened for use by Metrolink on 15 June 1992.

A new roof for platform 1, costing £180,000, was installed in 2006; this platform had been uncovered since glazed panels were removed in 2003, due to safety concerns. The new roof is made of coated steel with clear panels to let in the light.

The interchange joined the Bee Network on 5 January 2025, which oversees Greater Manchester's bus routes and Metrolink; the railway service will align by 2030.

The station clock tower on Stamford New Road, erected in 1880, is a Grade II listed structure.

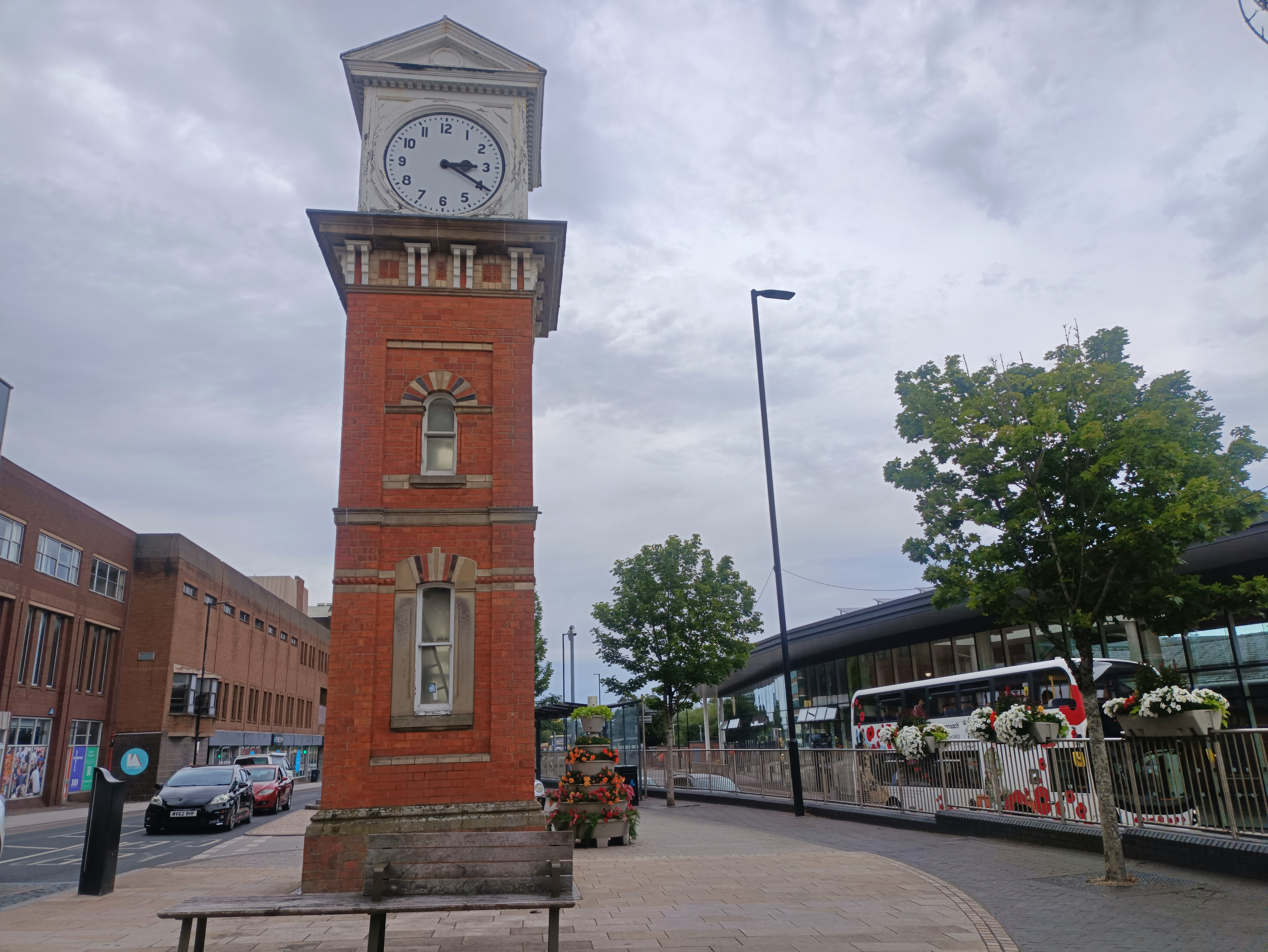
The clock tower beside the bus station

=== Redevelopment ===
The interchange redevelopment commenced in July 2013; the project was managed by Laing O'Rourke and was partly funded by the Local Sustainable Transport Fund.

The interchange reopened on 7 December 2014, although the lifts and some roofing in the railway station was not completed until 2015.

== Layout ==
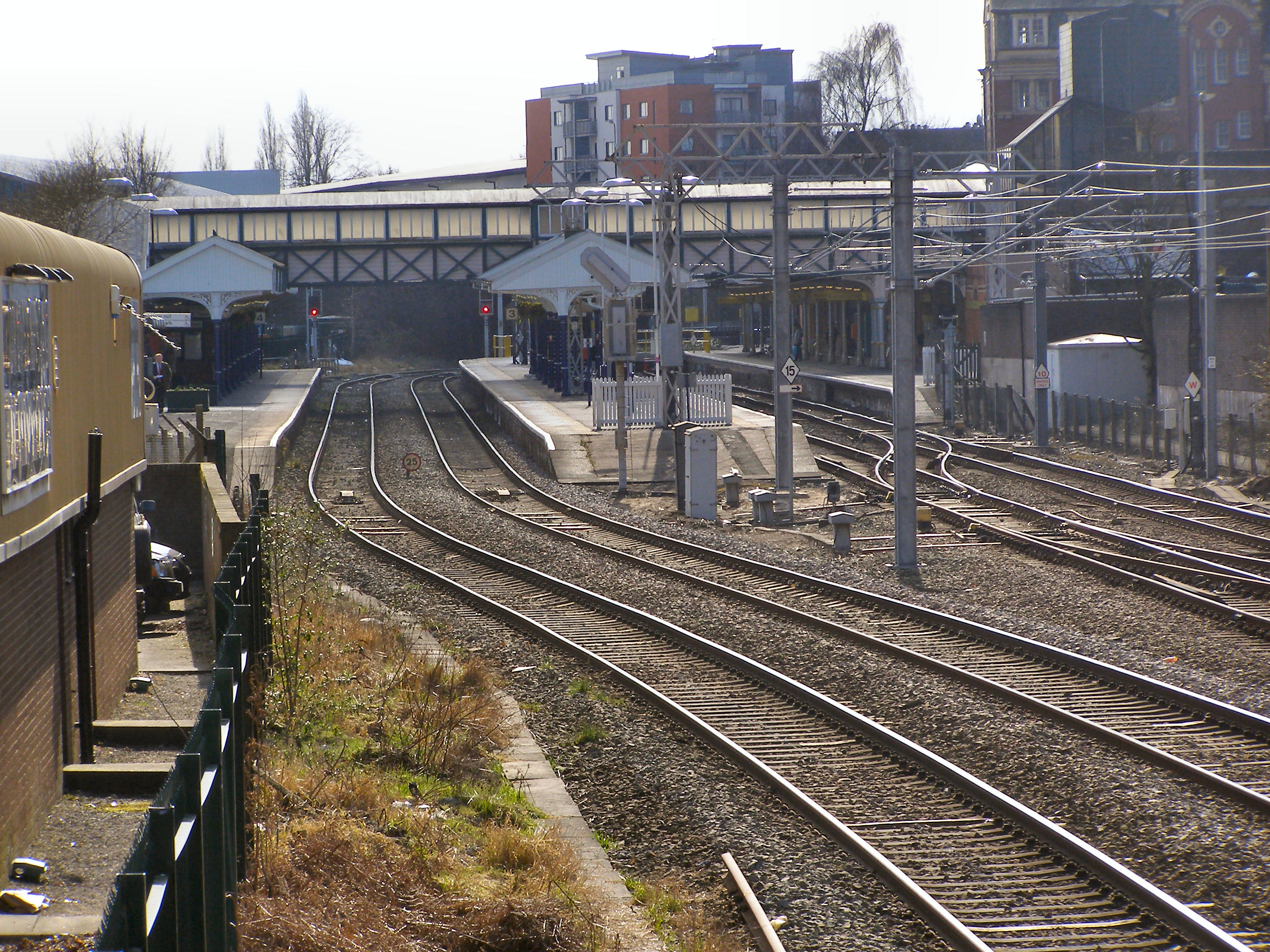
Looking south to the station; the terminating Metrolink tram tracks are to the right and railway through tracks to the left

Altrincham Interchange has four platforms: two bay platforms are used for Metrolink services and two through platforms accommodate railway services on the line between Manchester Piccadilly, Stockport and Chester.

There are five bus stands, lettered A-E. Most bus passengers are dropped off at one of two laybys located north of Stand A. There is also an extra layby opposite to stand B, which is not used for passengers.

== Services ==
=== Railway ===
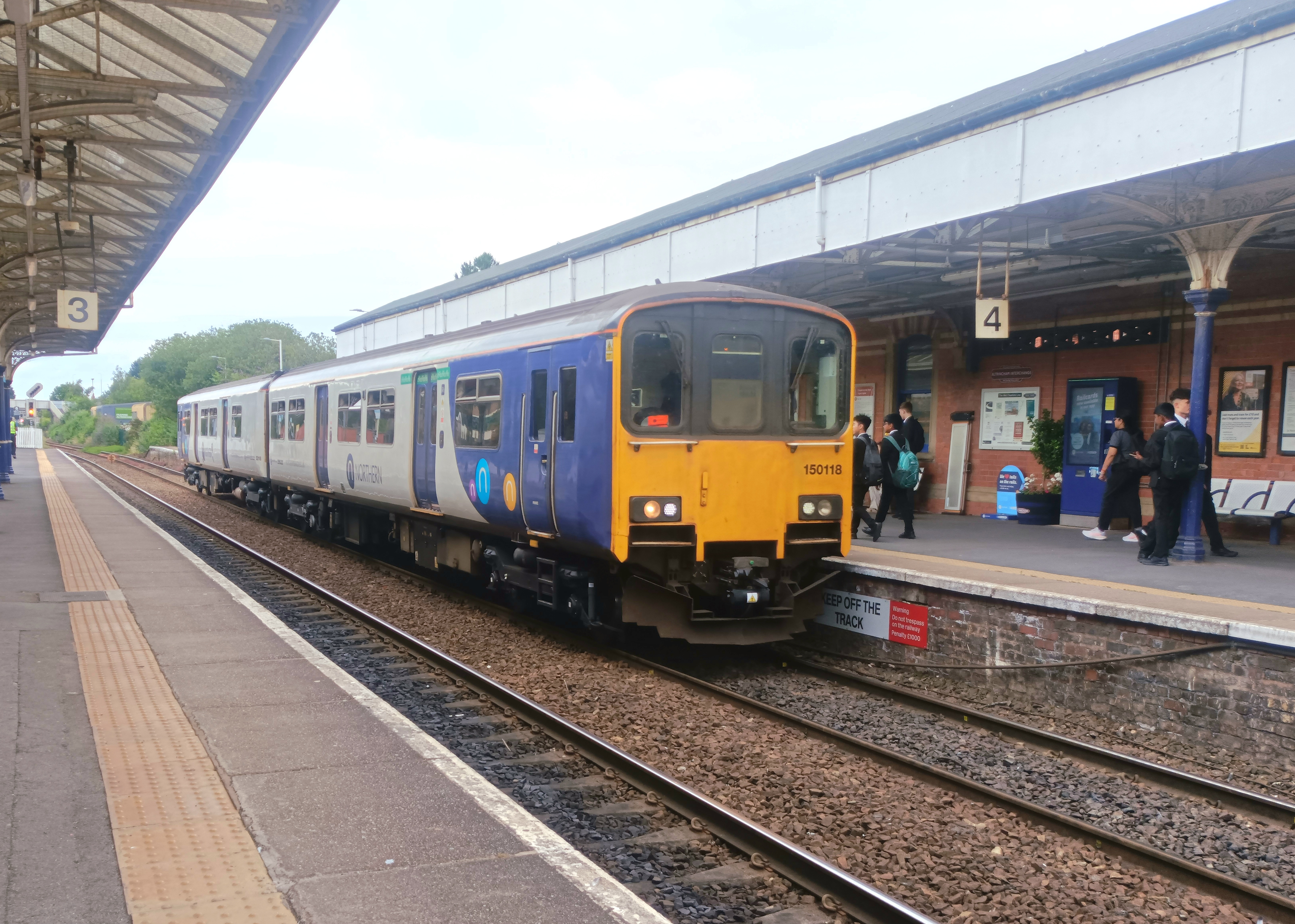
A train to Chester arrives at the station

Northern Trains operates an hourly service in each direction on the Mid-Cheshire line between Chester, Stockport and Manchester Piccadilly, with two peak extras to/from Stockport. The service operates every two hours on Sundays.

=== Metrolink ===
Altrincham
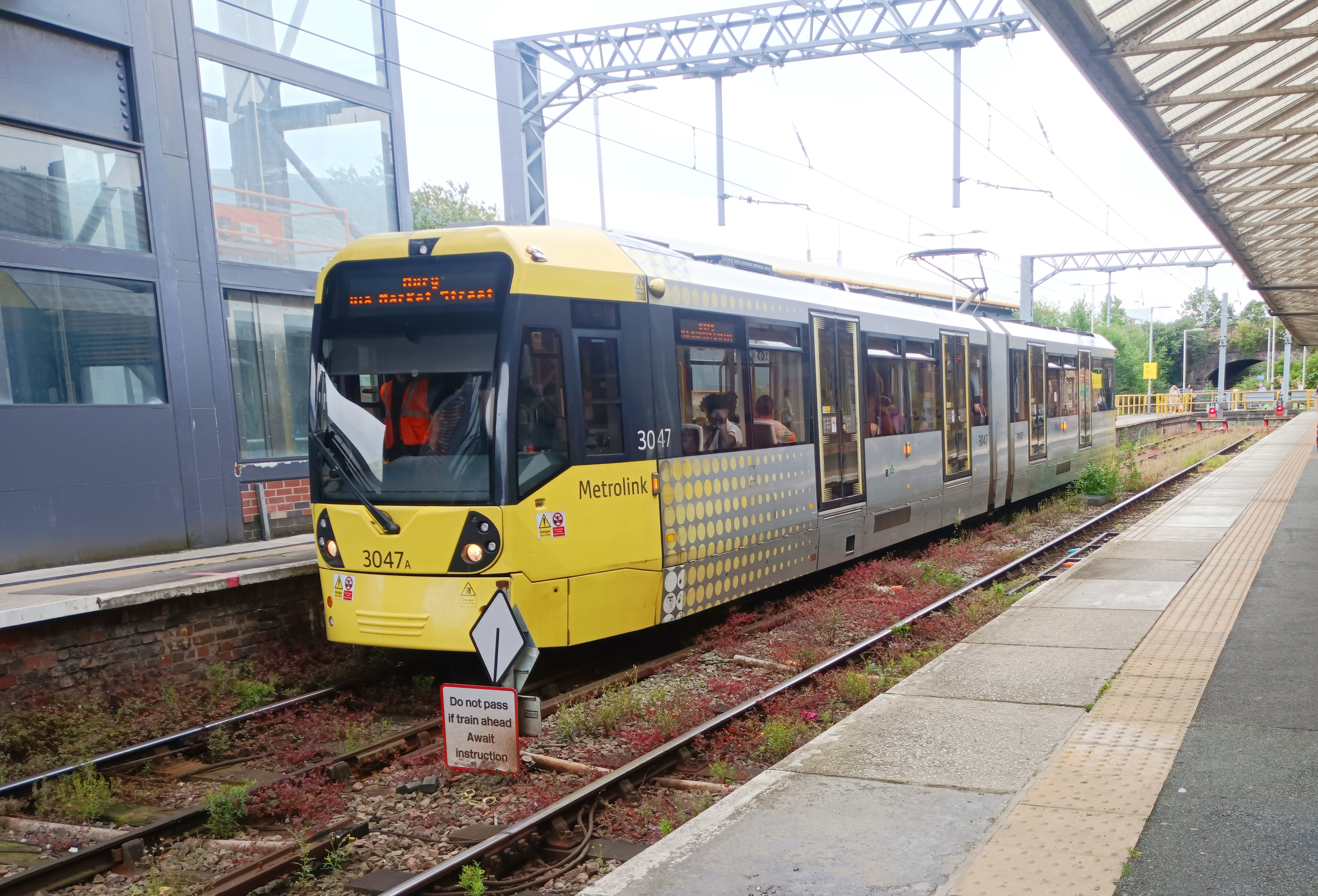
- A M5000 on platform 2

General information
- Location: Altrincham, Metropolitan Borough of Trafford, England
- Coordinates: 53.38752°N 2.34734°W
- System: Metrolink station
- Lines: Purple Line, Green Line
- Platforms: 2

Other information
- Status: In operation
- Fare zone: 4

History
- Original company: Manchester, South Junction and Altrincham Railway (MSJAR)
- Pre-grouping: MSJAR
- Post-grouping: MSJAR

Key dates
- 1992: Conversion to Metrolink operation
Route map
Location

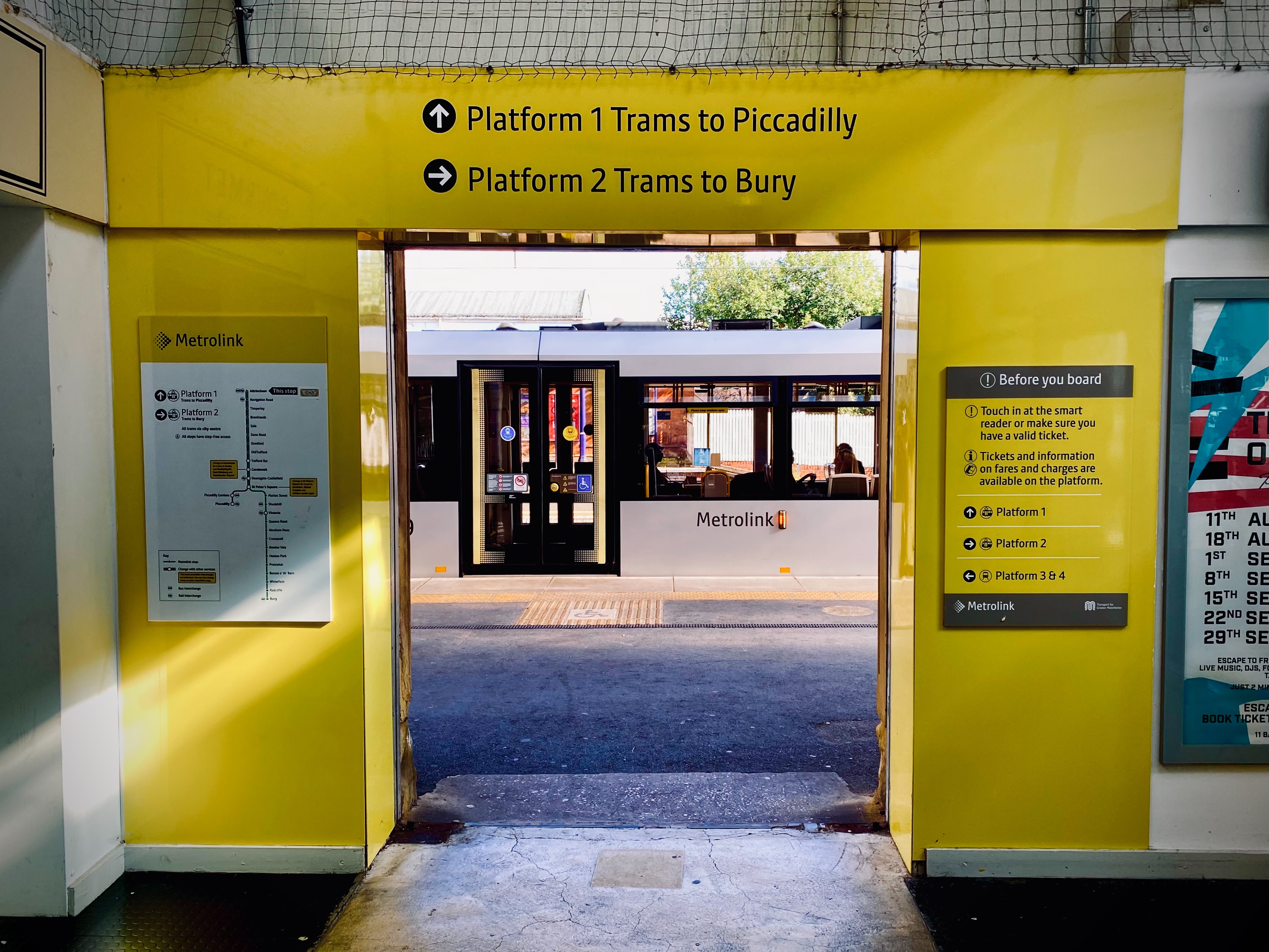
Metrolink entrance

Altrincham lies in Metrolink fare zone 4 and is the south-western terminus for two tram lines:

- Green line: services to Bury, via Manchester Victoria, depart every 12 minutes, with more at peak times
- Purple line: services to Manchester Piccadilly depart every 12 minutes, with more at peak times; evening services extend to Etihad Campus.

Preceding station	Manchester Metrolink	Following station
Terminus	Altrincham–Bury (peak only)	Navigation Road towards Bury
Terminus	Altrincham–Piccadilly	Navigation Road towards Piccadilly
Preceding station	National Rail	Following station
Hale	Northern Trains; Mid-Cheshire Line	Navigation Road
Historical railways
Hale; Line and station open	Cheshire Lines Committee; Mid-Cheshire Line	Sale; Line and station open
Disused railways
Baguley	Cheshire Lines Committee; Stockport, Timperley and Altrincham Junction Railway	Terminus

=== Buses ===
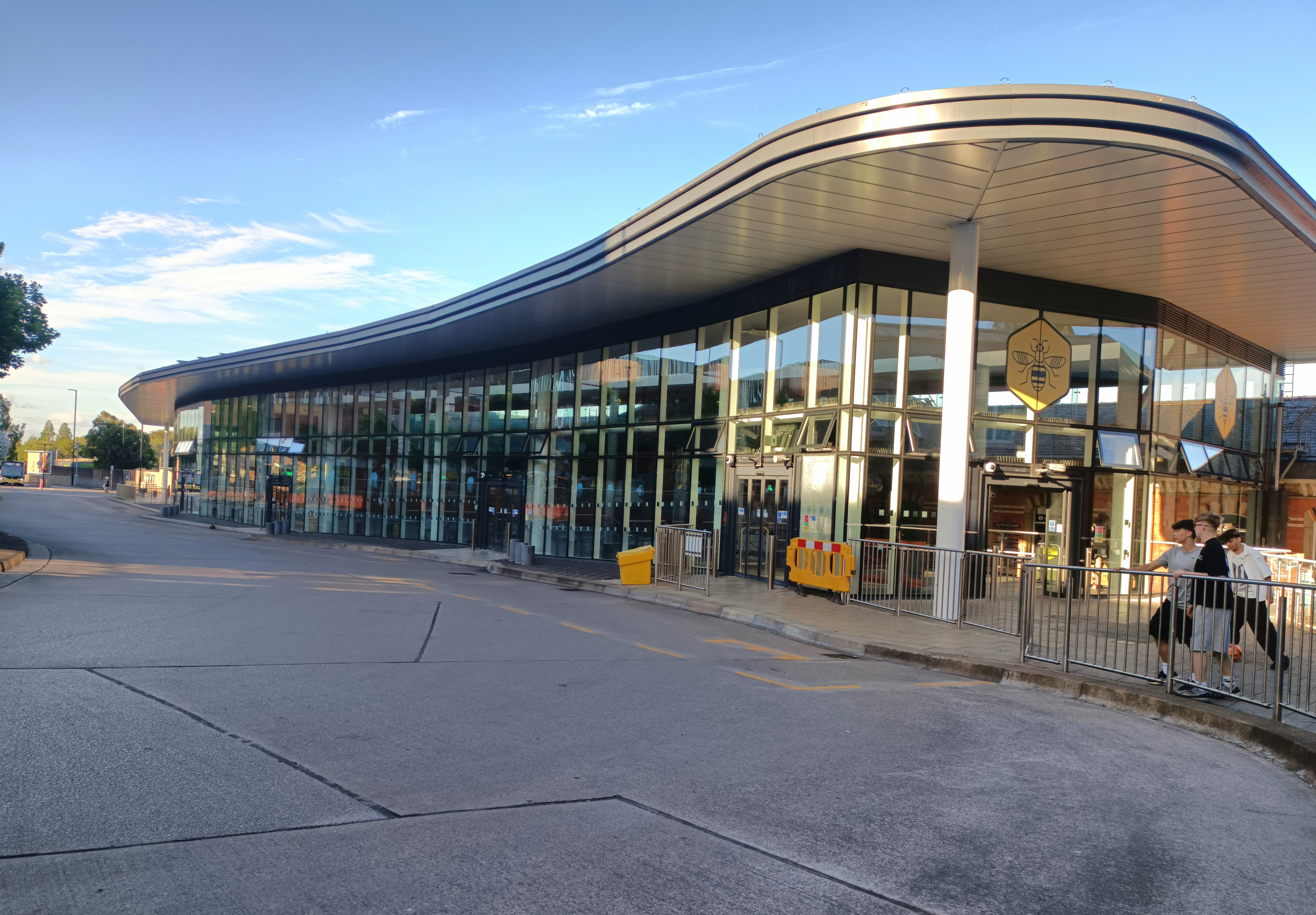
The bus station

Bus services are operated primarily by Metroline Manchester, but also by Stagecoach Manchester, Diamond Bus North West, Warrington's Own Buses and D&G Bus; routes connect Altrincham with Stockport Interchange, Manchester Piccadilly Gardens, Wythenshawe, Sale, Hale Barns, Manchester Airport, Warrington and Knutsford.

=== Taxis ===
There is also a taxi rank, located on Stamford New Road.
