= Manchester Metrolink =

Tram system in Greater Manchester, England

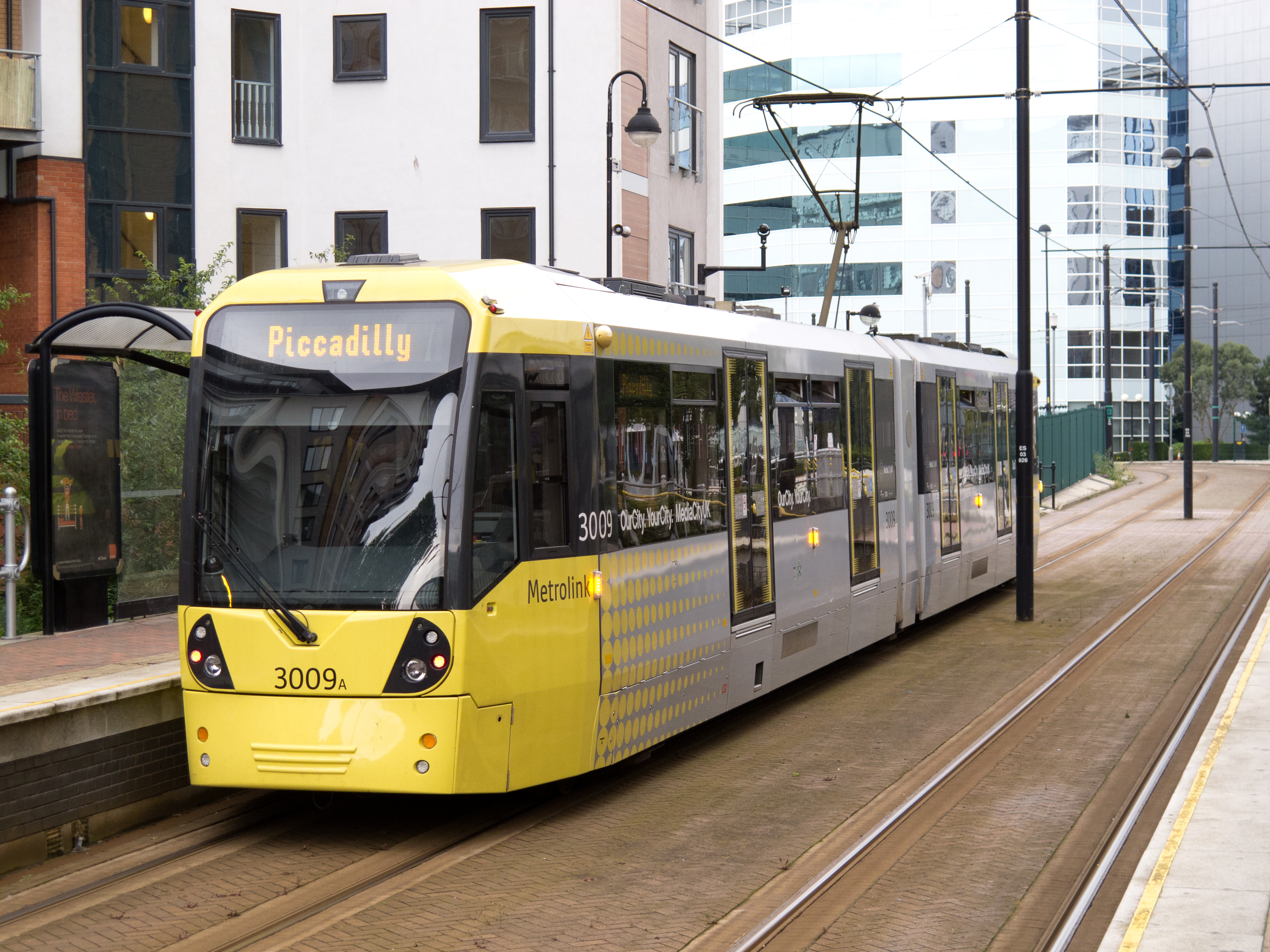
- A Bombardier M5000 at Exchange Quay, August 2011

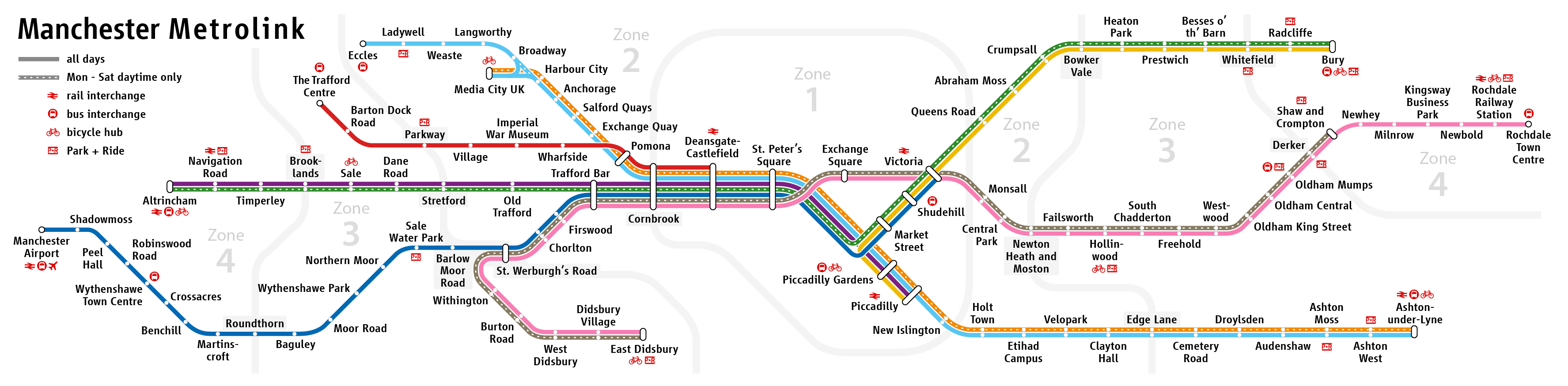
- Schematic map of Metrolink

Overview
- Owner: Transport for Greater Manchester
- Locale: Greater Manchester
- Transit type: Tram and Light rail
- Number of lines: 8
- Number of stations: 99
- Annual ridership: 46.6 million (2025/26) ▲1%
- Chief executive: Danny Vaughan (TfGM Metrolink director)
- Headquarters: Metrolink Trafford Depot; Stretford
- Website: www.tfgm.com/public-transport/tram

Operation
- Began operation: 6 April 1992; 34 years ago
- Operator: KeolisAmey Metrolink
- Number of vehicles: 147 Bombardier M5000
- Train length: 28.4 metres (93 ft)

Technical
- System length: 64 miles (103 km)
- Track gauge: 4 ft 8 1/2 in (1,435 mm) standard gauge
- Minimum radius of curvature: 25 m (82 ft)
- Electrification: 750 V DC overhead line
- Top speed: 50 miles per hour (80 km/h)

Manchester Metrolink (Note: The system is branded Metrolink. The Department for Transport refers to the system as Manchester Metrolink, an alternative unofficial name. It is defined in Acts of Parliament and Byelaws as the Greater Manchester Light Rapid Transit System and sometimes unofficially called Greater Manchester Metrolink.) (also known as Bee Network trams) is a tram and light rail system in Greater Manchester, England. The network has 99 stops along 64 miles (103 km) of standard-gauge route, making it the most extensive light rail system in the United Kingdom. Over the 2024/25 financial year, 46 million passenger journeys were made on the system.

Metrolink is owned by the public body Transport for Greater Manchester (TfGM) and is part of the region's Bee Network. It is operated and maintained under contract by KeolisAmey.

The network consists of eight lines, which radiate from Manchester city centre to termini at Altrincham, Ashton-under-Lyne, Bury, East Didsbury, Eccles, Manchester Airport, Rochdale and the Trafford Centre. It runs on a mixture of on-street track shared with other traffic, reserved track sections segregated from other traffic, and converted former railway lines.

Metrolink is operated by a fleet of 147 high-floor Bombardier M5000 light rail vehicles, first introduced in 2009. Each of the nine routes runs five trams per hour in each direction; stops with more than one route running through it will have trams arriving more frequently. Services on busier lines operate as doubles, which are two trams coupled together.

A light rail system for Greater Manchester emerged from the failure of the 1970s Picc-Vic tunnel scheme to obtain central government funding. A light-rail scheme was proposed in 1982 as the least expensive rail-based transport solution for Manchester city centre and the surrounding Greater Manchester metropolitan area. Government approval was granted in 1988, and the network began operating services between Bury Interchange and Victoria on 6 April 1992. Metrolink became the United Kingdom's first modern street-running rail system; the 1885-built Blackpool tramway being the only first-generation tram system in the UK that had survived up to Metrolink's creation.

Expansion of Metrolink has been a critical strategy of transport planners in Greater Manchester, who have overseen its development in successive projects, known as Phases 1, 2, 3a, 3b, 2CC and Trafford Park.

The latest extension, the Trafford Park Line from Pomona to The Trafford Centre, opened on 22 March 2020. The Greater Manchester Combined Authority has proposed numerous further expansions of the network, including the addition of tram-train technology to extend Metrolink services onto local heavy-rail lines.

== History ==
=== Predecessors ===
Manchester's first tram age began in 1877 with the first horse-drawn trams of Manchester Suburban Tramways Company. Electric traction was introduced in 1901, and the municipal Manchester Corporation Tramways expanded across the city. By 1930, Manchester's tram network had grown to 163 route miles (262 km), making it the third-largest tram system in the United Kingdom.

After World War II, electric trolleybuses and motor buses began to be favoured by local authorities as a cheaper transport alternative; by 1949, the last Manchester tram line was closed. Trolleybuses were withdrawn from service in 1966.

=== Origins ===
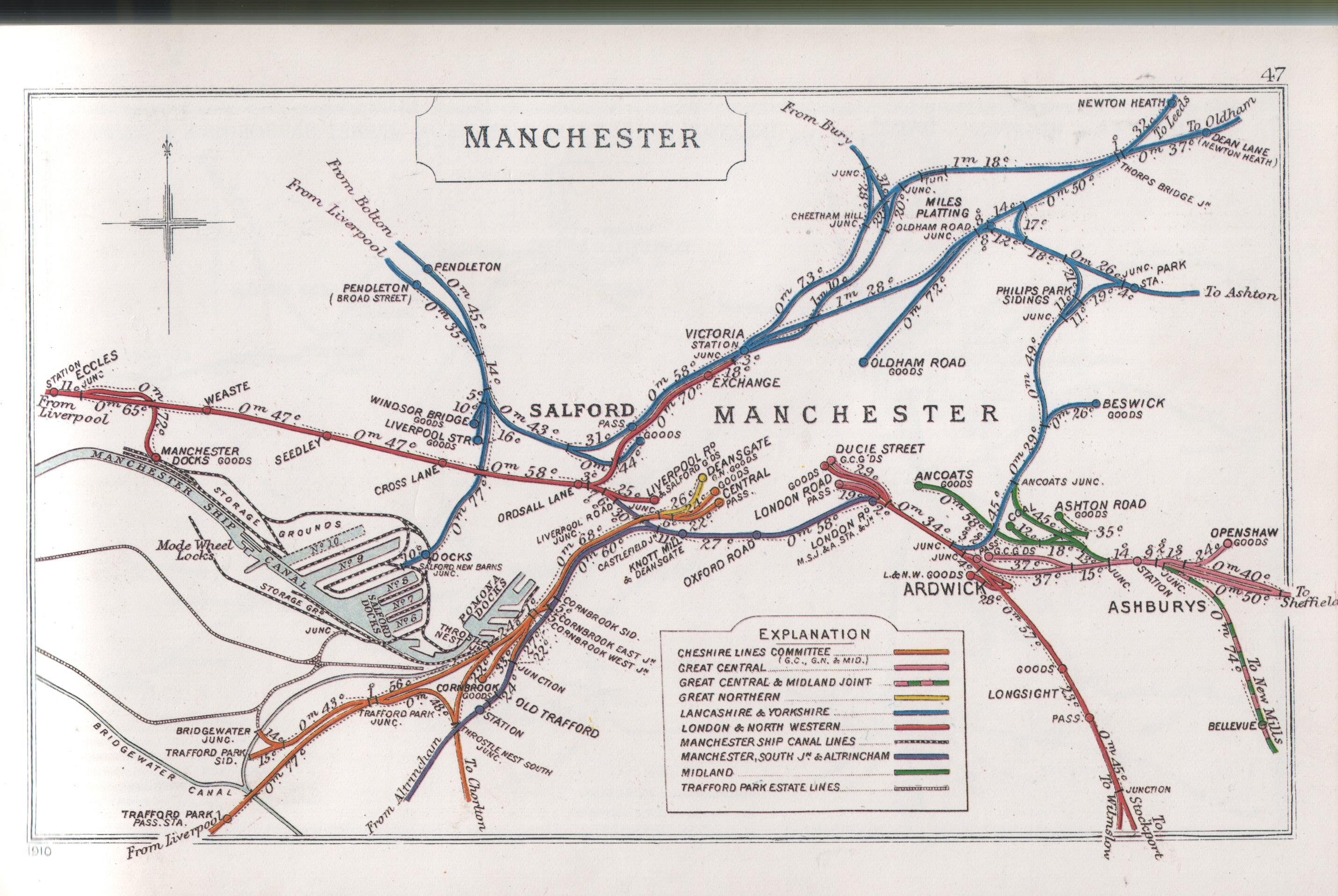
A 1910 map of Manchester's railways

Greater Manchester's railway network historically suffered from poor north–south connections because Manchester's main railway stations, Piccadilly and Victoria, were built in the 1840s on peripheral locations outside Manchester city centre. The central commercial district had no rail links and, over the years, several unsuccessful schemes were proposed to connect Manchester's rail termini.

In the 1960s, transport design studies were undertaken to address the problems of increasing traffic congestion. Many urban public transport schemes were evaluated for Manchester, including several types of monorail systems and metro-style systems.

While the monorail schemes were all abandoned, a scheme to create a tunnel link gained momentum. The SELNEC Passenger Transport Executive — the body formed in 1969 to improve public transport for Manchester and its surrounding municipalities — promoted the Picc-Vic tunnel project. The project was a proposal to link Piccadilly and Victoria stations, via a tunnel under the city centre, and enable train services to run across the Manchester conurbation. Greater Manchester County Council (GMC) inherited the project and presented it to the United Kingdom Government in 1974, but the council failed to secure the necessary funding and the project was abandoned in 1977. The Centreline shuttle bus service provided inter-station links for many years.

The Greater Manchester Passenger Transport Executive (GMPTE), the successor to SELNEC, continued to examine possible rail link solutions. Light rail emerged in the early 1980s as a cost-effective option that could make use of existing railway lines and run through the city centre at street level, eliminating the need for costly tunnelling works. A Rail Study Group, composed of officials from British Rail, GMC and GMPTE formally endorsed the Project Light Rail scheme in 1984. Initial abstract proposals, based on light rail systems in North America and continental Europe, illustrated a draft 62-mile (100 km) network consisting of three lines:

- Altrincham–Hadfield/Glossop
- Bury–Marple/Rose Hill Marple
- Rochdale–East Didsbury.

To promote the scheme, GMPTE held a public proof of concept demonstration in March 1987, using a Docklands Light Railway P86 train on a freight-only line adjacent to Debdale Park, in east Manchester. The Project Light Rail proposals were presented to the UK Government for taxpayer funding; following route revisions in 1984 and 1987, Project Light Rail was approved. Because of the central government's constraints on financial support for innovative transport projects, funding was granted by HM Treasury with the strict condition that the system be constructed in phases. Additional taxpayer funding came from the European Regional Development Fund and bank lending.

=== Construction ===
Metrolink construction phases 1992–2020

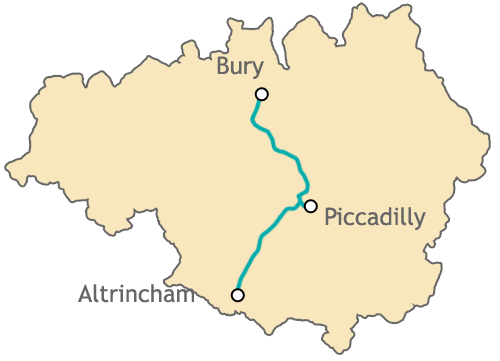
Phase 1 (1992)

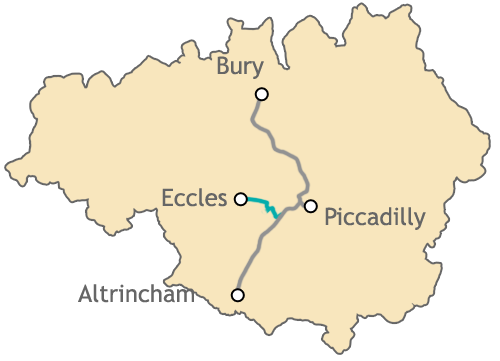
Phase 2 (1999–2000)

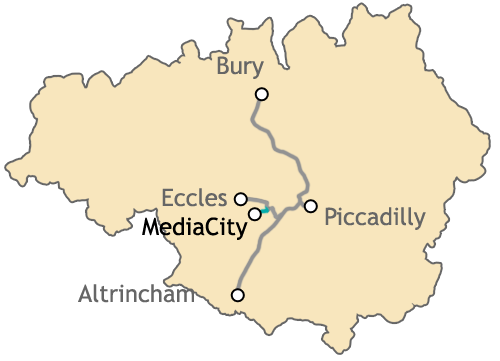
MediaCityUK spur (2010)

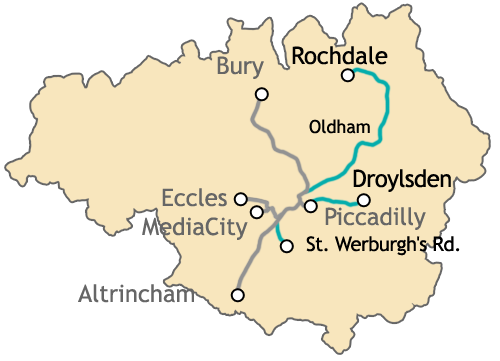
Phase 3a (2011–13)

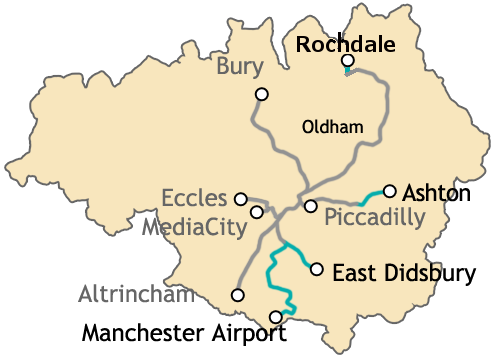
Phase 3b (2013–14)

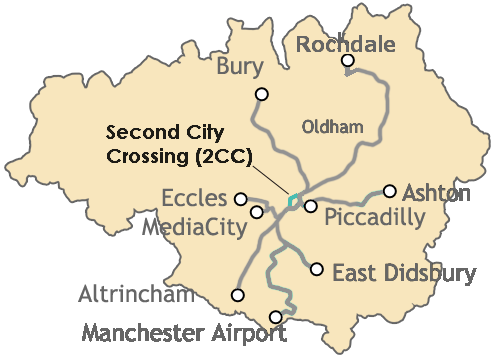
Second City Crossing (2015–17)

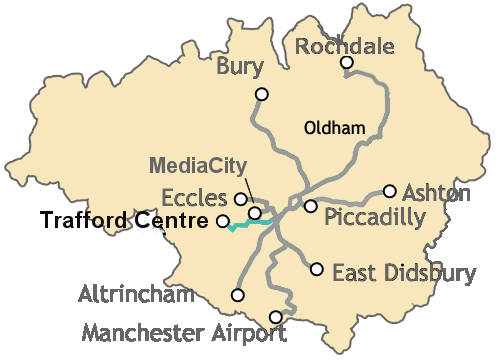
Trafford Park Line (2020)

==== Phase 1 ====
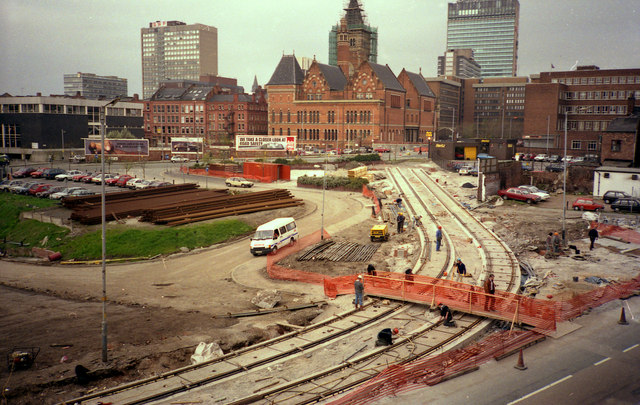
Phase 1 construction of the core section of the network near Manchester Piccadilly, 1991

Parliamentary authority to proceed with Phase 1 construction was obtained with two Acts of Parliament: the Greater Manchester (Light Rapid Transit System) Act 1988 and Greater Manchester (Light Rapid Transit System) (No. 2) Act 1988.

The first phase of Metrolink involved the conversion of two suburban heavy rail lines to light rail operation:

- The Bury Line in the north; conversion started in July 1991
- The MSJ&AR line in the south; conversion started December 1991

Construction of a street-level tramway through the city centre was also required to connect the two. Tracks were laid down along a 1.9-mile (3.1 km) route from Victoria station, via Market Street and St Peter's Square to the G-Mex, with a 0.4-mile (0.64 km) branch from Piccadilly Gardens to Piccadilly station. This route is now known as the First City Crossing (1CC) and it was built with network expansion in mind.

A fleet of 26 AnsaldoBreda T-68 light rail vehicles was procured to operate the 19.2-mile (30.9 km) network. Construction was carried out by the GMA Group (a consortium of AMEC, GM Buses, John Mowlem & Company and GEC), costing £145 million (equivalent to £320 million in 2025).

Metrolink was initially scheduled to open in September 1991, but services did not begin until 1992, when the Bury Line reopened from Victoria station to Bury Interchange on 6 April. The first street-level trams began running on 27 April between Victoria and G-Mex (renamed Deansgate-Castlefield in 2010), and the Altrincham Line reopened on 15 June from G-Mex to Altrincham Interchange. The branch to Piccadilly station opened on 20 July. Metrolink was opened officially by Queen Elizabeth II on 17 July 1992.

==== Phase 2 ====
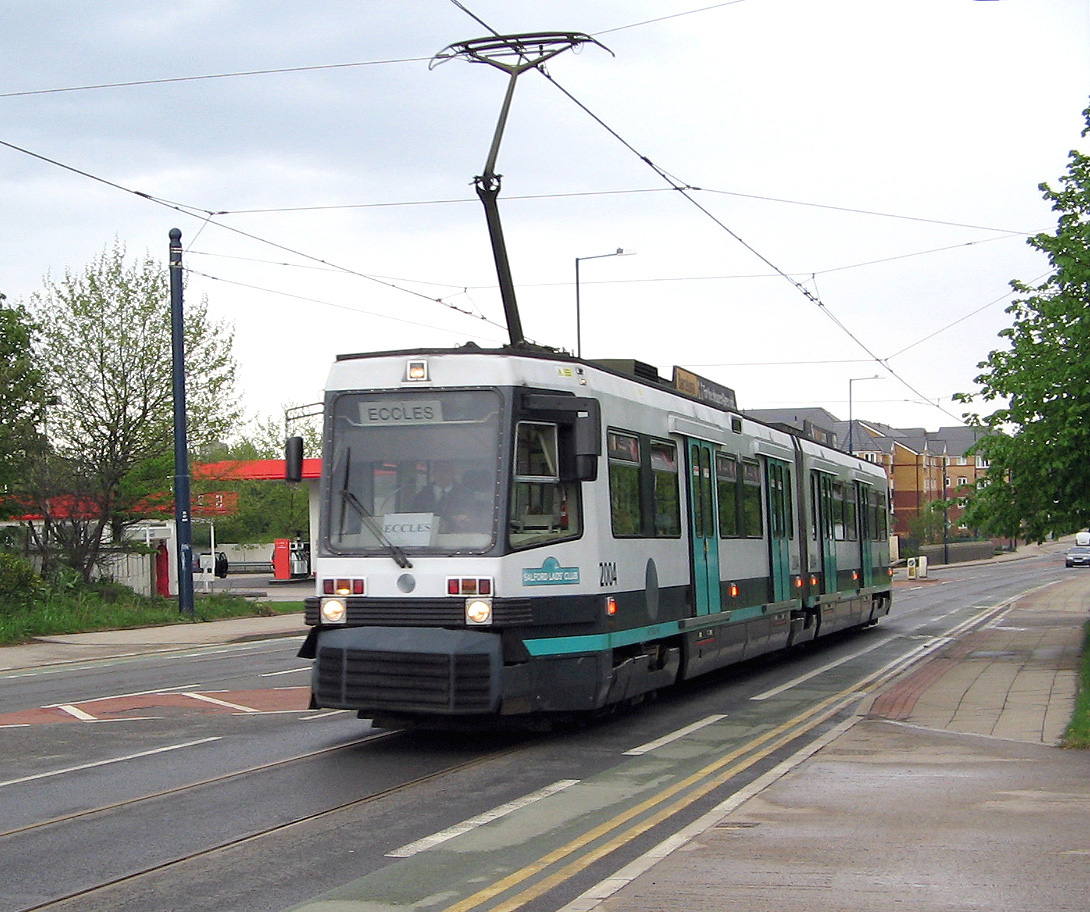
A now-retired T-68A tram on the Eccles line, which opened in 1999–2000 during Phase 2

In Phase 2, the Metrolink network was extended westwards to Eccles along the new 4-mile (6.4 km) Eccles Line, as part of the 1990s urban regeneration of Salford Quays, increasing the total Metrolink route length to 24 miles (39 km). The extension cost £160 million (equivalent to £304 million in 2025) and was funded by the GMPTA, the ERDF and private developers. It was constructed 1997–99 by Altram (a consortium of Serco, Ansaldo and John Laing) and six new AnsaldoBreda T-68A trams were bought to operate services on the line, but were also used in other locations across the network. The line was inaugurated by prime minister Tony Blair on 6 December 1999 as far as Broadway tram stop, as the street running section to Eccles Interchange was completed. The Broadway–Eccles section was opened on 21 July 2000, and the complete line was officially opened by Princess Anne on 9 January 2001.

==== Phase 3 ====
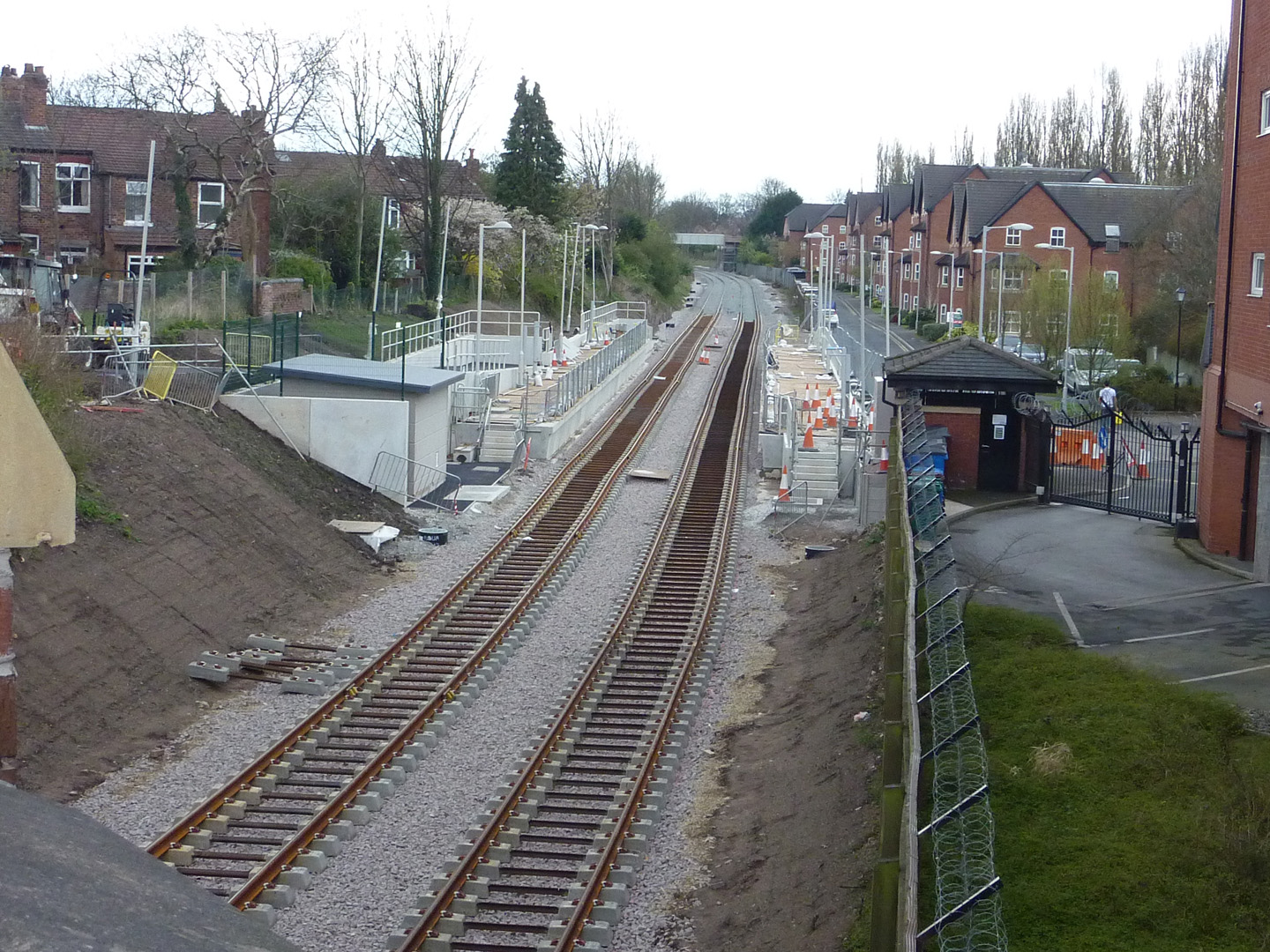
Phase 3 included the reopening of a disused railway line through Didsbury

The Phase 3 extension project, nicknamed the "Big Bang", was promoted by GMPTE and the Association of Greater Manchester Authorities (AGMA) in the early 2000s. The project, costing £489 million (£929 million in 2025), would create four new lines:

- Oldham and Rochdale Line
- East Manchester Line
- South Manchester Line
- Airport Line.

Phase 3 was put in doubt when central government funding was withdrawn, due to increasing costs but, after negotiations with the Department for Transport, Phase 3 was split into two parts, 3a and 3b, to secure investment.

The new 0.25-mile (0.40 km) spur off the Eccles Line to MediaCityUK was funded separately by the Northwest Regional Development Agency. As part of Phase 3, the original blue T-68 trams were withdrawn and replaced with a new fleet of Bombardier M5000 trams, which entered service in December 2009.

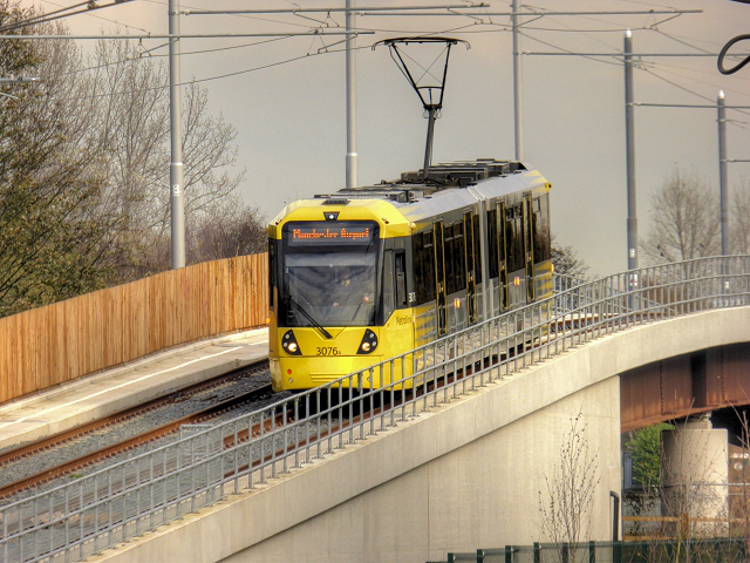
Phase 3 extended Metrolink to Manchester Airport and introduced a new fleet of M5000 trams

Beginning in October 2009 with the closure of the 14-mile (23 km) Oldham Loop heavy rail line, Phase 3a involved converting this line to light rail operation, including rebuilding all stations on the route and adding several new stops, reopening a disused 1.7-mile (2.7 km) section of the former Cheshire Lines Committee railway to use as the first part of the South Manchester Line (up to St Werburgh's Road), and building a new 4-mile (6.4 km) East Manchester Line as far as Droylsden. When completed in 2013, Phase 3a increased Metrolink's total network length to 43 miles (69 km).

Phase 3b involved the construction of a new 9-mile (14 km) Airport Line to Manchester Airport, and extending three of the Phase 3a lines:

- the East Manchester Line to Ashton-under-Lyne
- the South Manchester Line to East Didsbury
- and adding street-running routes through Oldham and Rochdale town centres to the Oldham and Rochdale Line.

Construction work began in March 2011 and Phase 3b was completed in November 2014, with the Airport Line's opening.

Phase 3b was delayed after a failed bid to raise funding through the Greater Manchester Transport Innovation Fund and a proposed traffic congestion charge in 2008. GMPTE and AGMA instead funded Phase 3b through a combination of council tax, government grants, Metrolink fares and contributions from the Manchester Airports Group and other bodies.

==== Second City Crossing ====
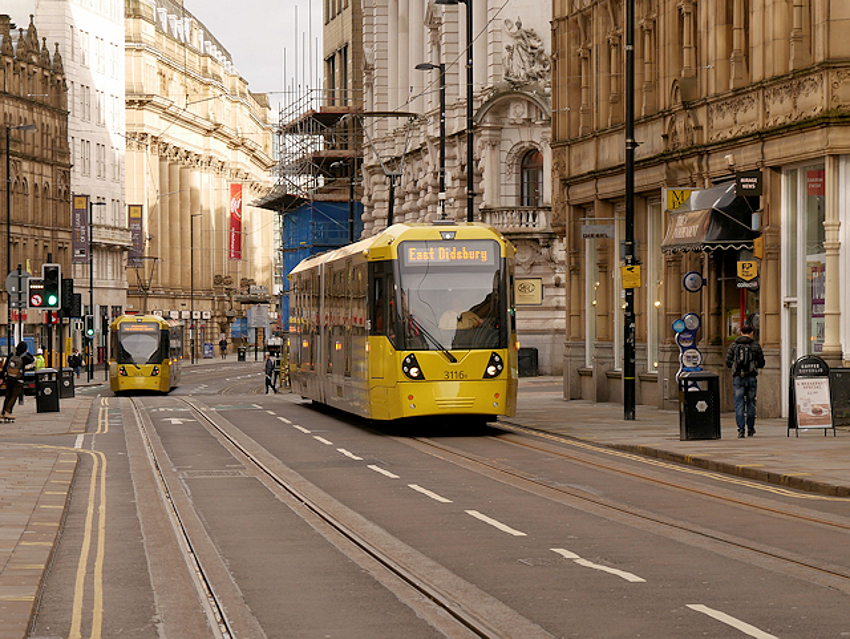
Two trams running on the Second City Crossing (2CC) in Cross Street, 2017

With increased tram traffic brought about by the expansion of the Metrolink network, it became necessary to build a new route across Manchester city centre to alleviate congestion and improve capacity.

Known as the Second City Crossing (or 2CC), the project involved laying 0.8 miles (1.3 km) of tram tracks from St Peter's Square tram stop, via Princess Street, Albert Square, Cross Street and Corporation Street, to rejoin the original Metrolink line just before Victoria station. The project cost £165 million in 2017. One new tram stop was built at Exchange Square. The project also involved reordering St Peter's Square and resiting the Cenotaph to accommodate an enlarged tram interchange and junction. The realigned tracks were to run over the site of the former St Peter's Church (demolished 1907).

To protect the remaining underground burial vaults of the church, concrete slabs were put in place below street level before the tram tracks were laid. The stone cross marking the location of the former church was restored and re-instated close to its original location, in between the tracks.

Construction began in 2014 and the 2CC route opened fully in February 2017.

==== Trafford Park ====
The Transport & Works Act Order for the 3.4-mile (5.5 km) Trafford Park Line was granted in October 2016. This new line includes six tram stops, including, but not limited to, a stop at Wharfside to serve Old Trafford Stadium closer and faster than Old Trafford tram stop, a stop at Imperial War Museum, also providing a closer and faster connection to IWM North from the city centre, the alternative tram option being walking from MediaCityUK, and a stop adjacent to Barton Dock Road, serving Trafford Palazzo. All six stops also opened with new dot matrix displays unique to the rest of the network. Enabling works began in January 2017, and the first test tram ran in November 2019 between Pomona and Village. The line finally opened on 22 March 2020. The COVID-19 lockdown in the United Kingdom commenced on the second day of operation, overshadowing news of the new line's opening, leading it to low ridership after the lockdown ended.

== Lines ==
=== Lines and stops ===
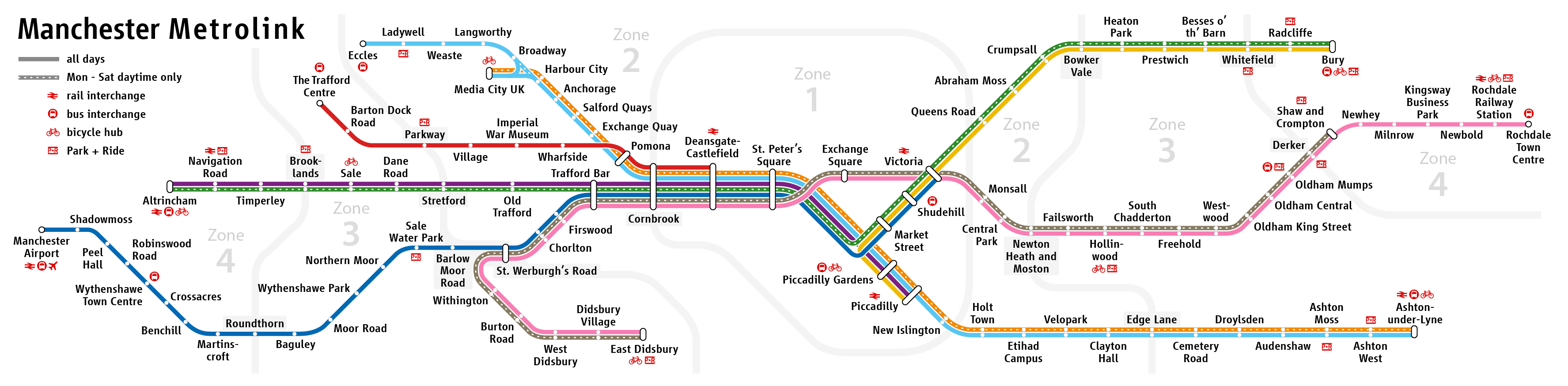
Manchester Metrolink route map. The map above is not official and is outdated; it may be inaccurate.

List of all Metrolink lines, operating times and stops
Colour	Route	Operating hours	Stops
	Altrincham– Bury via Market Street	Mon–Sat daytime (Note: Daytime services run 07:15–19:30 on weekdays and 09:30–18:00 on Saturdays.)	Altrincham; Navigation Road; Timperley; Brooklands; Sale; Dane Road; Stretford; Old Trafford; Trafford Bar; Cornbrook; Deansgate-Castlefield ( Deansgate); St Peter's Square; Market Street; Shudehill; Victoria; Queens Road; Abraham Moss; Crumpsall; Bowker Vale; Heaton Park; Prestwich; Besses o' th' Barn; Whitefield; Radcliffe; Bury
	Altrincham– Piccadilly	Mon–Sun all‑day (Note: All-day services run 06:00–23:30 Mondays to Thursdays, 06:00–00:30 Fridays and Saturdays, and 07:00–22:30 Sundays and bank holidays.)	Altrincham; Navigation Road; Timperley; Brooklands; Sale; Dane Road; Stretford; Old Trafford; Trafford Bar; Cornbrook; Deansgate-Castlefield ( Deansgate); St Peter's Square; Piccadilly Gardens; Piccadilly
	Altrincham– Etihad Campus via Piccadilly	Mon–Sat evenings (Note: Evening services run 19:30–23:30 on weekdays (except bank holidays) and 18:00–22:30 on Saturdays.); Sun all‑day	Altrincham; Navigation Road; Timperley; Brooklands; Sale; Dane Road; Stretford; Old Trafford; Trafford Bar; Cornbrook; Deansgate-Castlefield ( Deansgate); St Peter's Square; Piccadilly Gardens; Piccadilly; New Islington; Holt Town; Etihad Campus
	Ashton-under-Lyne– Eccles (via MediaCityUK)	Mon–Sun all‑day	Ashton-under-Lyne ( Ashton-under-Lyne); Ashton West; Ashton Moss; Audenshaw; Droylsden; Cemetery Road; Edge Lane; Clayton Hall; Velopark; Etihad Campus; Holt Town; New Islington; Piccadilly; Piccadilly Gardens; St Peter's Square; Deansgate-Castlefield ( Deansgate); Cornbrook; Pomona; Exchange Quay; Salford Quays; Anchorage; Harbour City; MediaCityUK (Note: MediaCityUK served by Eccles trams between 06:00–07:15 and 19:30–23:30 Monday to Thursday); Broadway; Langworthy; Weaste; Ladywell; Eccles ( Eccles)
	Etihad Campus– MediaCityUK via Piccadilly	Mon–Sat daytime	Etihad Campus; Holt Town; New Islington; Piccadilly; Piccadilly Gardens; St Peter's Square; Deansgate-Castlefield ( Deansgate); Cornbrook; Pomona; Exchange Quay; Salford Quays; Anchorage; Harbour City; MediaCityUK
	Bury–Piccadilly	Mon–Sun all‑day	Bury; Radcliffe; Whitefield; Besses o' th' Barn; Prestwich; Heaton Park; Bowker Vale; Crumpsall; Abraham Moss; Queens Road; Victoria; Shudehill; Market Street; Piccadilly Gardens; Piccadilly
	East Didsbury– Rochdale Town Centre via Exchange Square and Oldham	Mon–Sun all‑day	East Didsbury ( East Didsbury); Didsbury Village; West Didsbury; Burton Road; Withington; St Werburgh's Road; Chorlton; Firswood; Trafford Bar; Cornbrook; Deansgate-Castlefield ( Deansgate); St Peter's Square; Exchange Square; Victoria; Monsall; Central Park; Newton Heath and Moston; Failsworth; Hollinwood; South Chadderton; Freehold; Westwood; Oldham King Street; Oldham Central; Oldham Mumps; Derker; Shaw and Crompton; Newhey; Milnrow; Kingsway Business Park; Newbold; Rochdale Railway Station; Rochdale Town Centre
	East Didsbury– Shaw and Crompton via Exchange Square	Mon–Sat daytime	East Didsbury ( East Didsbury); Didsbury Village; West Didsbury; Burton Road; Withington; St Werburgh's Road; Chorlton; Firswood; Trafford Bar; Cornbrook; Deansgate-Castlefield ( Deansgate); St Peter's Square; Exchange Square; Victoria; Monsall; Central Park; Newton Heath and Moston; Failsworth; Hollinwood; South Chadderton; Freehold; Westwood; Oldham King Street; Oldham Central; Oldham Mumps; Derker; Shaw and Crompton
	The Trafford Centre– Crumpsall	Mon–Sun all‑day	The Trafford Centre; Trafford Palazzo; Parkway; Village; Imperial War Museum; Wharfside; Pomona; Cornbrook; Deansgate-Castlefield ( Deansgate); St Peter's Square; Exchange Square; Victoria; Queens Road; Abraham Moss; Crumpsall
	Manchester Airport– Victoria via Market Street	Mon–Sun all‑day	Manchester Airport; Shadowmoss; Peel Hall; Robinswood Road; Wythenshawe Town Centre; Crossacres; Benchill; Martinscroft; Roundthorn; Baguley; Moor Road; Wythenshawe Park; Northern Moor; Sale Water Park; Barlow Moor Road; St Werburgh's Road; Chorlton; Firswood; Trafford Bar; Cornbrook; Deansgate-Castlefield ( Deansgate); St Peter's Square; Market Street; Shudehill; Victoria

=== Frequencies ===
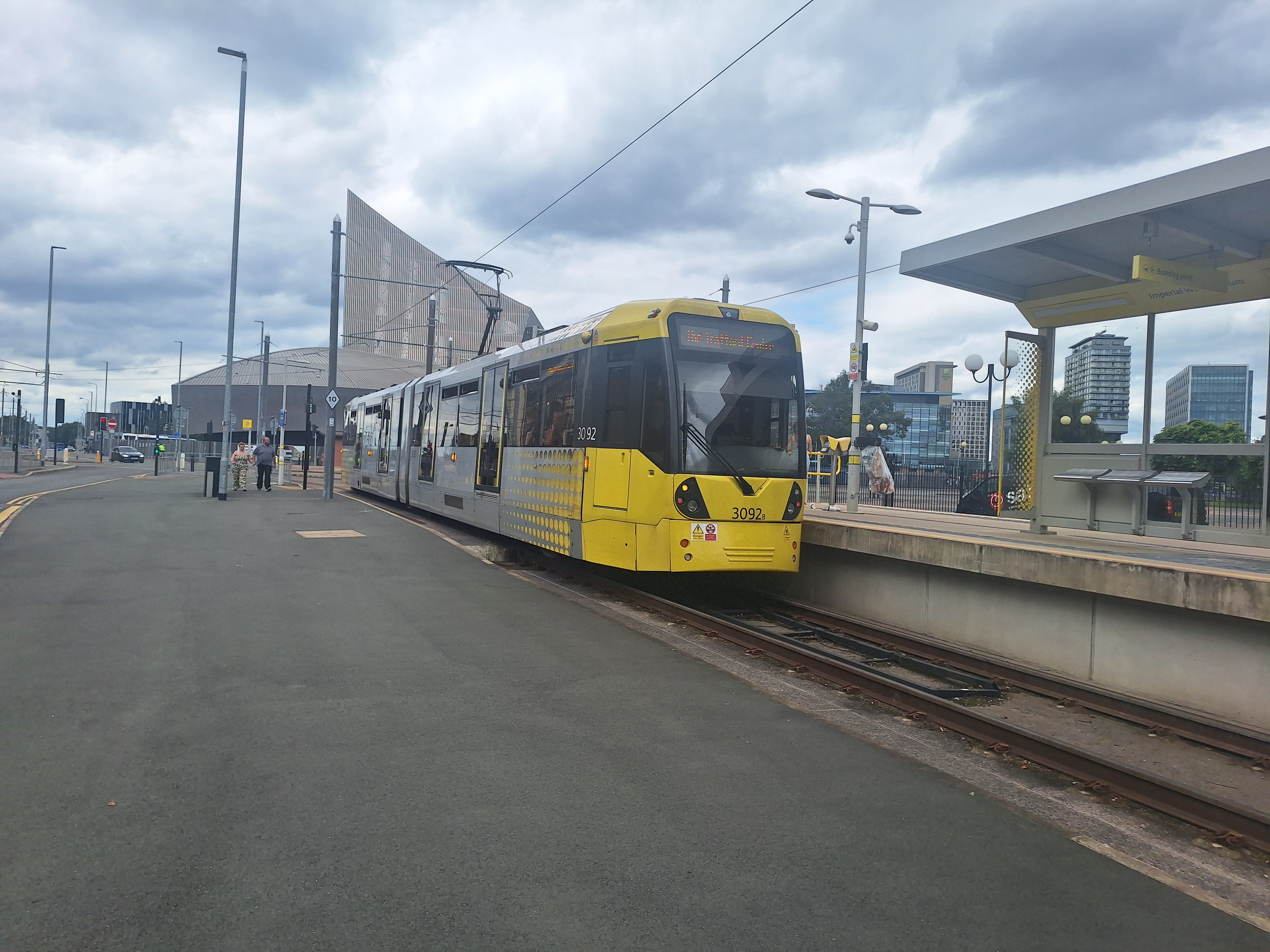
Metrolink tram during the day at the Imperial War Museum tram stop

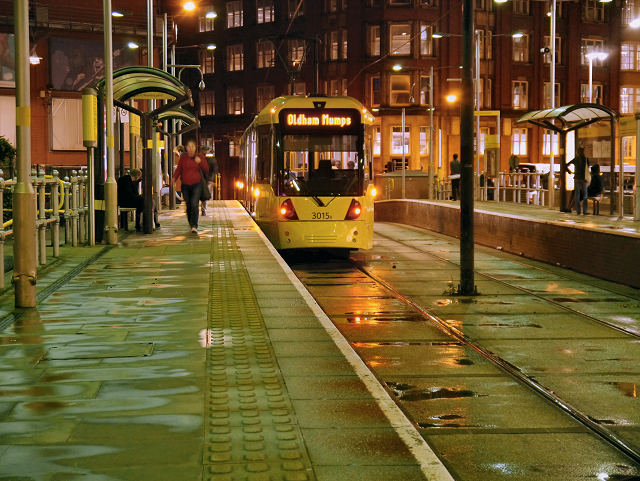
Metrolink tram at night at Shudehill Interchange

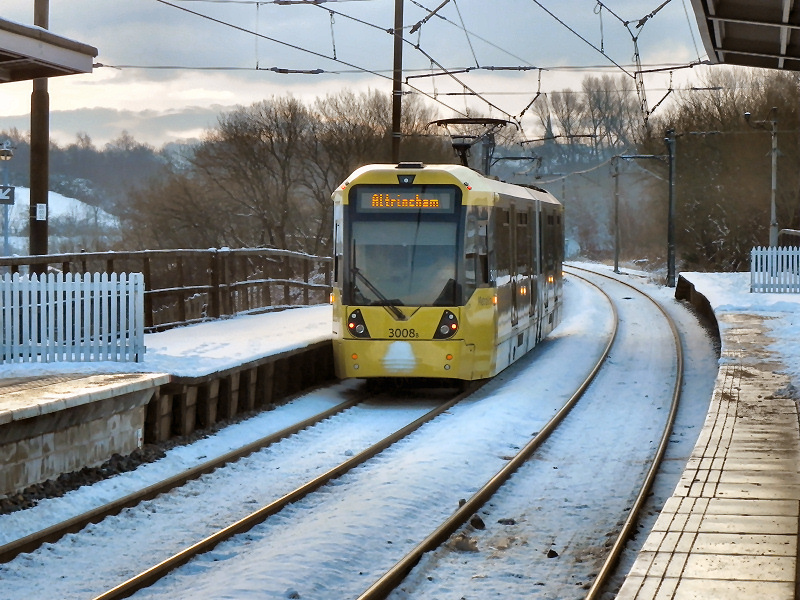
Metrolink tram in December snow at Radcliffe tram stop

Before the inauguration, GMPTE's original concept was for Metrolink's operator to provide a service every ten minutes from Bury to Piccadilly and Altrincham to Piccadilly from 06:00 to midnight, Monday to Saturday. Greater Manchester Metro Limited, the system's original operator, argued for adjustments, citing the need to provide an efficient and commercially viable operation in line with vehicle running times and passenger demand. Due to power limitations, this pattern was modified to a twelve-minute service throughout the day, doubling to a six-minute service in peak periods, resulting in a ten trams per hour service pattern on routes running from Altrincham and Bury to Manchester every six minutes. Operators were required to provide this level of service at least 98% of the time or incur a financial penalty charge. This twelve-minute service pattern has been adopted on the rest of the network as the system has grown.

A map of Metrolink lines alongside heavy rail lines in Greater Manchester

Heavy snowfall during the winter of 2009/10 impaired Metrolink services and the operator was criticised for failing to have cold weather procedures. This prompted a programme to improve the reliability and performance of the system in freezing conditions. Metrolink operated icebreaker-style vehicles at night during snowfall in January 2013, to provide standard services.

In January 2016, Transport for Greater Manchester agreed on a baseline Service Specification to grade bidders seeking to operate the concession from July 2017, once the Second City Crossing was in operation. In the baseline service pattern, there are no designated 'peak' periods of service operation; instead, there was an 'enhanced' service operating from start of service to 08:00 Monday to Friday, and to 18:00 Saturday; and a 'core' service running at all other times. In the 'enhanced' service pattern, trams ran with a six-minute frequency to Shaw and Crompton, Bury, Ashton-under-Lyne, Altrincham, Manchester Airport and East Didsbury; and with a 12-minute frequency to Rochdale, Eccles and MediaCityUK.

As of 2026, due to training and recruitment efforts, the core service pattern operates exactly one route to every terminus on the Metrolink network, during all operating times, (Note: Mon-Thu (06:00–00:00), Fri-Sat (06:00–01:00), Sun (07:00–00:00)) at a 15-minute frequency on all routes. The enhanced service pattern operates the core service plus extra services up to Bury, Altrincham, Etihad Campus, Shaw and Crompton, East Didsbury, and MediaCityUK.

==== Core all-day services ====
The following services run during all operating times, from 06:00–00:00 on Monday–Thursday, 06:00–01:00 on Friday–Saturday, and 07:00–00:00 on Sundays and bank holidays. (Note: The core service is the minimum that Metrolink can provide whilst bringing trams to all available stops.)

Six services which each run to a 15-minute frequency:

- Altrincham – Etihad Campus
- Ashton-under-Lyne – Bury
- Eccles – Piccadilly (via MediaCityUK outside Mon–Sat daytime hours)
- East Didsbury – Rochdale Town Centre
- The Trafford Centre – Crumpsall
- Manchester Airport – Victoria

==== Enhanced daytime services ====
The following services run alongside the core service during peak times: from 07:00–20:00 on Monday–Friday and 09:00–18:30 on Saturdays.

Three extra services which each run to a 15-minute frequency:

- Altrincham – Bury
- MediaCityUK – Piccadilly
- East Didsbury – Shaw and Crompton

Thus the combined frequency for some routes is every 7.5 minutes or less.

==== Other part-day services ====
The Altrincham – Piccadilly service operates an extended service to Etihad Campus from 20:00–00:00 on Monday–Thursdays, 20:00–01:00 Friday–Saturdays, and 07:00–00:00 (all day) Sundays and bank holidays.

One service which replaces the normal service and runs to Etihad Campus via Piccadilly and runs to a 12-minute frequency (24-minute after 00:00 and 15-minute on Sundays):

- Altrincham – Etihad Campus

From 30 March to autumn of 2026, the Altrincham – Piccadilly service has been replaced by the Altrincham – Etihad Campus via Piccadilly service which runs every 15 minutes, so the extended service is the default service during this period.

==== Early morning service ====
The early morning service used to operate from 03:00–06:00 Monday–Saturdays and 03:00–07:00 on Sundays and bank holidays.

One service which ran to a 20-minute frequency:

- Manchester Airport – Deansgate-Castlefield

This was mostly to support airport shift workers and people with early flights; however, these services were removed in March 2020 due to the COVID-19 pandemic. There are currently no plans to reintroduce this service.

==== Services during COVID-19 pandemic ====
Due to changing travel patterns as a result of the COVID-19 pandemic, advice was against all but essential travel, and thus, the Metrolink temporarily introduced a reduced timetable, and trams ran to a 20-minute frequency on the following routes only.

Gradually over the following months, with more people returning to work and social activities, the service frequency on all routes was increased to 10 minutes during peak times and 20 minutes off-peak Monday–Saturday, and every 15 minutes on Sundays. Normal service was reintroduced on 5 July 2021, although temporarily removed in late August 2021 due the number of staff having to self-isolate. The two enhanced service routes at the time: Altrincham–Bury direct and Shaw and Crompton–East Didsbury resumed on 31 August and 6 September 2021 respectively.

- Altrincham – Piccadilly
- Ashton-under-Lyne – Eccles via MediaCityUK
- Bury – Piccadilly
- East Didsbury – Rochdale Town Centre
- The Trafford Centre – Crumpsall
- Manchester Airport – Victoria

==== Service changes in 2026 ====
From 30 March to the autumn of 2026, service frequency was changed from every 12 minutes and every 24 minutes after midnight, to every 15 minutes at all times. This is due to a significant recruitment drive and training effort to improve the resilience of the Metrolink workforce.

== Rolling stock ==
=== Current fleet ===
As of 2025, Metrolink operated a fleet of 147 trams.

Class	Image	Type	Top speed		Length metres	Capacity			In service	Fleet numbers	Routes operating	Built	Years operated
Class	Image	Type	mph	km/h	Length metres	Std	Sdg	Total	In service	Fleet numbers	Routes operating	Built	Years operated
Bombardier M5000		Tram/Light rail	50	80	28.4	60	146	206	60	3001–3060	Entire network	2009–2016	2009–present
Bombardier M5000		Tram/Light rail	50	80	28.4	60	146	206	14	3061–3074	Entire network except Timperley–Altrincham	2009–2016	2009–present
Bombardier M5000		Tram/Light rail	50	80	28.4	66	146	212	46	3075–3120	Entire network except Timperley–Altrincham	2009–2016	2009–present
Bombardier M5000		Tram/Light rail	50	80	28.4	66	146	212	27	3121–3147	Entire network except Timperley–Altrincham	2018–2022	2021–present
Total									147				

The network uses high-floor trams with a platform height of 900 mm (35 in) because low-floor tram technology was in its infancy when Metrolink was in its planning stages; in order to be compatible with the former British Rail stations that Metrolink inherited, it uses the same height as main line trains.

Trams on Metrolink operate either single units, or coupled together to form double units, which regularly run on the Altrincham – Bury line and on other lines during peak hours.

==== Bombardier M5000 ====
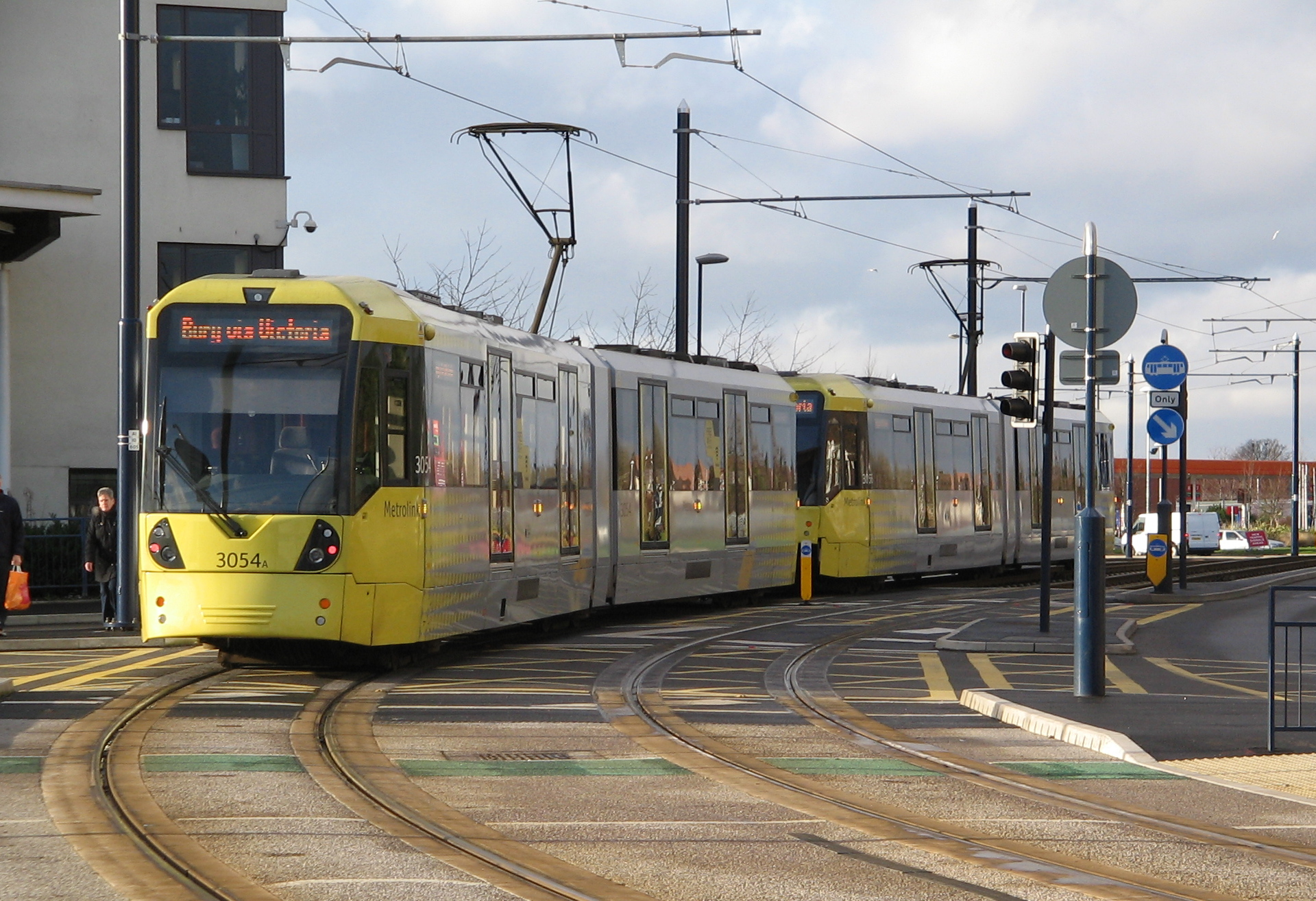
A coupled pair of M5000 trams, pictured in Ashton-under-Lyne, 2013

In December 2009, Metrolink took delivery of the first Bombardier M5000 tram. Built by Bombardier Transportation and Vossloh Kiepe, the initial eight M5000s were ordered to allow services to be increased. They are part of the Bombardier Flexity Swift range of light rail vehicles and have a design similar to the K5000 vehicle used on the Stadtbahn networks of Cologne and Bonn.

With the approval of the spur to MediaCityUK, a further four were ordered. To provide rolling stock for the phase 3 extensions and replace the existing fleet, the order was increased successively to 94. In December 2013, a further 10 M5000s were ordered to provide trams for the Trafford Park Line planned to open in 2020, while in the interim supporting a service between MediaCityUK and Manchester city centre and other capacity enhancements. In September 2014, a further 16 were ordered; the final one of which was delivered in October 2016, bringing the fleet up to 120.

In July 2018, a further 27 were ordered to help relieve overcrowding. Delivered from November 2020, the final tram was delivered in October 2022.

The Bombardier M5000 trams produce distinctive 'whistle' sound effects, which are synthesised sounds played as WAV files by a speaker. The official names of the two tones are the street whistle, which sounds like a steam whistle and the louder 'rail horn' which sounds like a BR high tone. The sounding device is located under the cab floor. The raw WAV sound effects were released to the public through a freedom of information request in 2021.

=== Ancillary vehicles ===
Metrolink has several ancillary vehicles used for maintenance within depots. The "Special Purpose Vehicle", later numbered 1027 with its support wagon 1028, is a bespoke diesel-powered vehicle dating from the networks construction in 1991. It is fitted with a crane, inspection platform, mobile workshop, and capacity for a driver and three passengers. It was designed to assist with vehicle recovery and track and line repairs although to the end of its service life rarely left its base at Queens Road Depot. By January 2023 both 1027 & 1028 had been withdrawn from service and offered for sale in September 2024.

In 2020, Metrolink took delivery of a Zephir Crab 2100E, a small battery powered vehicle for use moving trams within the depot. It is based at Queens Road to replace the Special Purpose Vehicle. Trafford depot operates a smaller Zephir Crab 1500E dating from construction of the depot in 2011. A Unimog road-rail vehicle was added to the fleet in mid-2022 to support infrastructure inspection and maintenance activities.

=== Former fleet ===
Manchester Metrolink has previously operated the following trams:

Class	Image	Type	Top speed		Length metres	Capacity			Number	Fleet numbers	Routes operated	Built	Years operated
Class	Image	Type	mph	km/h	Length metres	Std	Sdg	Total	Number	Fleet numbers	Routes operated	Built	Years operated
AnsaldoBreda T-68		Tram	50	80	29	86	122	208	26	1001–1026	Bury Line Altrincham Line (later Eccles Line)	1991–1992	1992–2014
AnsaldoBreda T-68A		Tram	50	80	29	86	122	208	6	2001–2006	Eccles Line	1999	1999–2014

==== T-68/68A ====
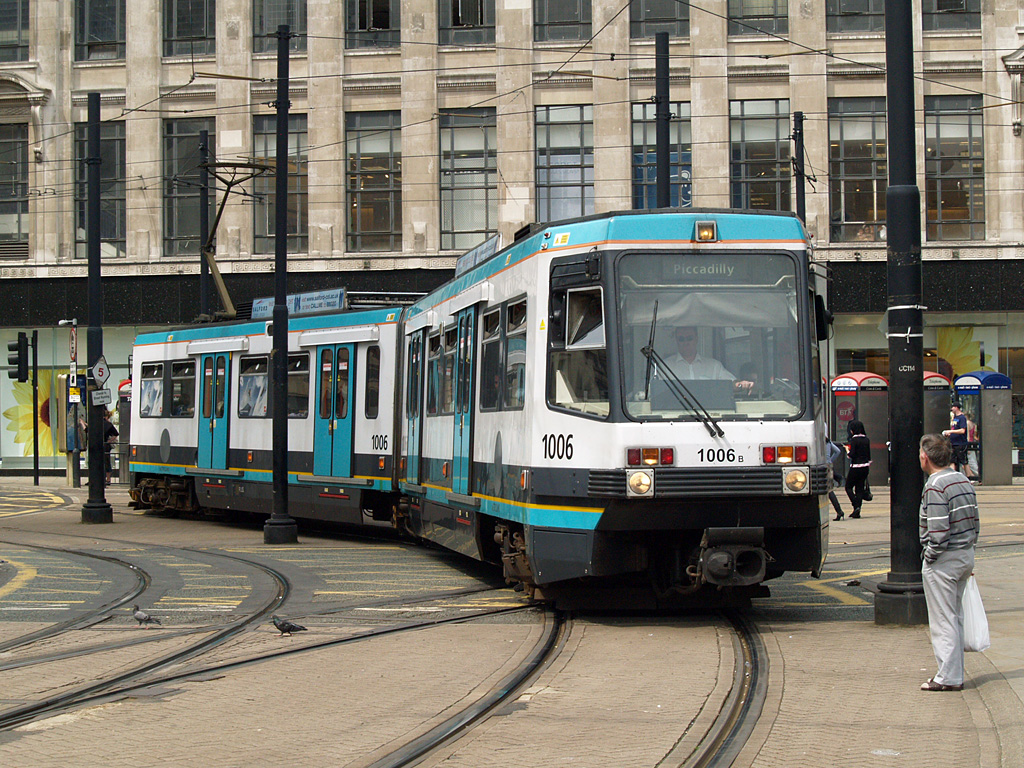
AnsaldoBreda T-68 in Manchester city centre, 2008

To commence operations, a fleet of 26 T-68 trams manufactured by AnsaldoBreda in Italy was delivered in 1992. To provide extra trams for the Eccles Line, six modified T-68A trams were purchased in 1999. The T-68A vehicles were based on the original T-68s but had modifications replacing destination rollblinds with dot matrix displays, and retractable couplers and covered bogies necessary for the high proportion of on-street running close to motor traffic.

Three of the earlier T-68 fleet were similarly equipped and were known as T-68Ms. Mechanically and electrically, the T-68M vehicles were essentially a T-68 with modifications to its brakes, mirrors, and speed limiters to suit the Eccles line. Initially only these vehicles were permitted to operate the Eccles line but the entire fleet except for 3 (1018, 1019, 1020) were modified between 2008 and 2012 for universal running, under a programme known as the T-68X Universal Running programme.

The newer M5000 trams proved to be considerably more reliable than the T-68/A fleet, which averaged 5,000 miles (8,000 km) between breakdowns, while the M5000 trams averaged 20,000 miles (32,000 km). This led to a decision in 2012 to withdraw the entire fleet from service and replace them with M5000s. The T-68 and T-68A fleet was withdrawn between April 2012 and April 2014.

T68 1007 is owned by the Manchester Transport Museum Society, which runs the Heaton Park Tramway; it remains in store at Old Trafford depot until it can be accommodated at Heaton Park. 1023 remains under the ownership of Transport for Greater Manchester and is at the Crewe Heritage Centre on display.

=== San Francisco SLRVs ===
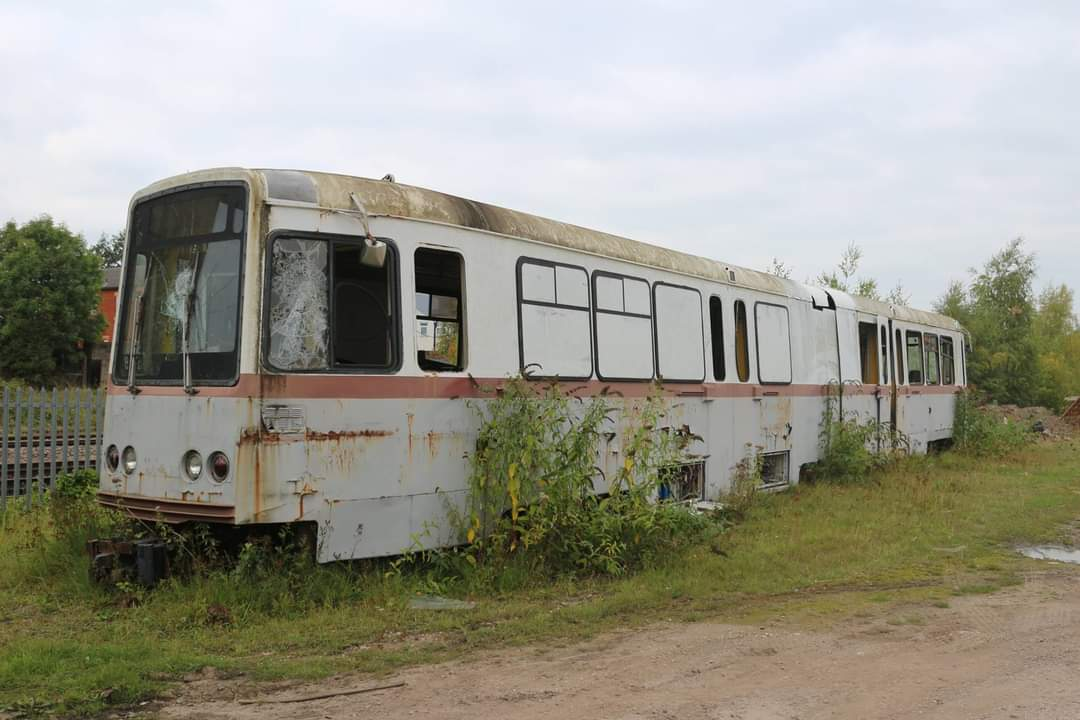
San Francisco Muni, Boeing SLRV 1226

In 2002, in the lead up to Manchester hosting the Commonwealth Games, a requirement to increase capacity for the event led to Metrolink investigating the purchase of redundant second-hand Boeing Standard Light Rail Vehicle units from the Muni Metro system in San Francisco. Two were procured for testing at a cost of £170 each, although transport costs added £15,000 to that figure. The LRVs, numbered 1226 and 1326, were shipped to the UK in January 2002, with 1326 taken to Queen's Road depot and 1226 sent to a research centre in Derby for safety evaluations. 1326 was hauled by the special purpose vehicle on a test from Queens Road depot to Eccles and back but suffered from a number of derailments. In the end, the proposal was not taken forward as the vehicles were found to be unsuitable and not cost effective for use in the UK with both later being scrapped.

== Infrastructure ==
=== Network ===
As of August 2022, Metrolink has a network length of 64 miles (103 km) and 99 stops — along eight lines which radiate from a "central triangular junction at Piccadilly Gardens which forms the hub of the Metrolink system" in Zone 1.

The lines are: the Airport Line (which terminates at Manchester Airport), the Altrincham Line (which terminates in Altrincham), the Bury Line (which terminates in Bury), the East Manchester Line (which terminates in Ashton-under-Lyne), the Eccles Line (which terminates in Eccles), the Oldham and Rochdale Line (which terminates in Rochdale), the South Manchester Line (which terminates in East Didsbury), and the Trafford Park Line (which terminates at the Trafford Centre).

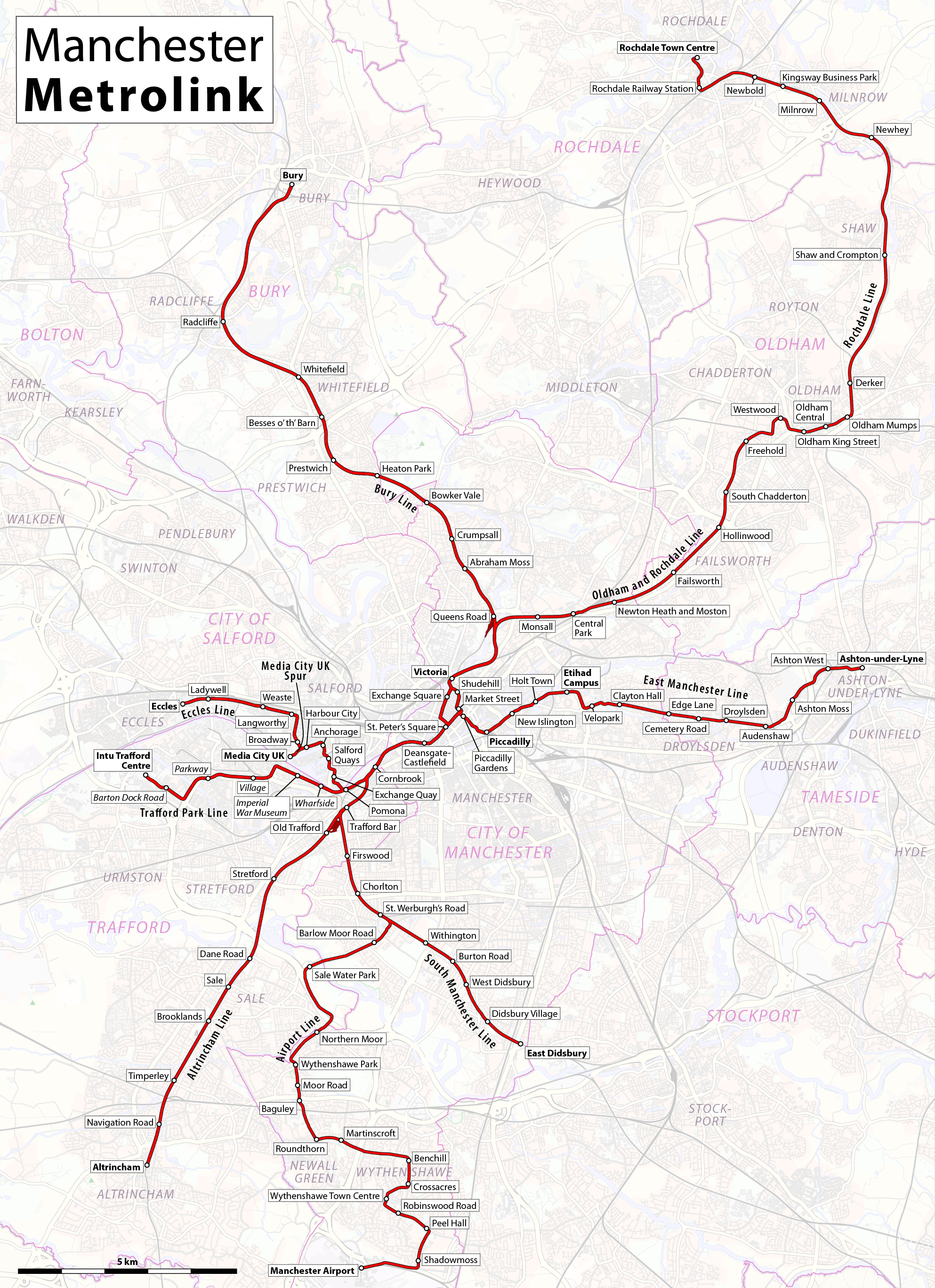
Geographic map of Metrolink system.

Current Metrolink lines
Line	First operated	Route type(s)	Length		Stops	Peak frequency trains per hour (tph)	First station	Terminus
Line	First operated	Route type(s)	mi	km	Stops	Peak frequency trains per hour (tph)	First station	Terminus
Airport Line	3 November 2014	On and off-street (Note: The line crosses the Mersey by a new bridge near Jackson's Boat and runs over the floodplain alongside Rifle Road.)	14.4	23.2	15	5 tph	Barlow Moor Road	Manchester Airport
Altrincham Line	15 June 1992	Converted railway track	7.6	12.2	10	10–40 tph	Cornbrook	Altrincham
Bury Line	6 April 1992	Converted railway track	9.9	15.9	11	10 tph	Victoria	Bury
East Manchester Line	11 February 2013	On and off-street	6.0	9.7	12	5–10 tph	New Islington	Ashton-under-Lyne
Eccles Line	6 December 1999	On and off-street	4.0	6.4	10	5–10 tph	Pomona	Eccles
First City Crossing	27 April 1992	On and off-street	1.2	2	4	15–35 tph	Shudehill	Deansgate-Castlefield
MediaCityUK spur (Note: Follows the Eccles line routes from Piccadilly before turning off at Harbour City to MediaCityUK.)	20 September 2010	Off-street	0.21	0.34	1	5 tph	–	MediaCityUK
Oldham and Rochdale Line	13 June 2012	On and off-street, converted railway track	14.8	23.8	19	5–10 tph	Monsall	Rochdale Town Centre
Piccadilly spur	20 July 1992	On and off-street	0.6	0.9	2	20 tph	Piccadilly Gardens	Piccadilly
Second City Crossing	6 December 2015	On and off-street	0.8	1.3	1	10 tph	Exchange Square	–
South Manchester Line	7 July 2011	Converted railway trackbed	4.4	7.1	8	10–15 tph	Firswood	East Didsbury
Trafford Park Line	22 March 2020	On and off-street	3.4	5.5	6	5 tph	Wharfside	The Trafford Centre

=== Tram stops ===
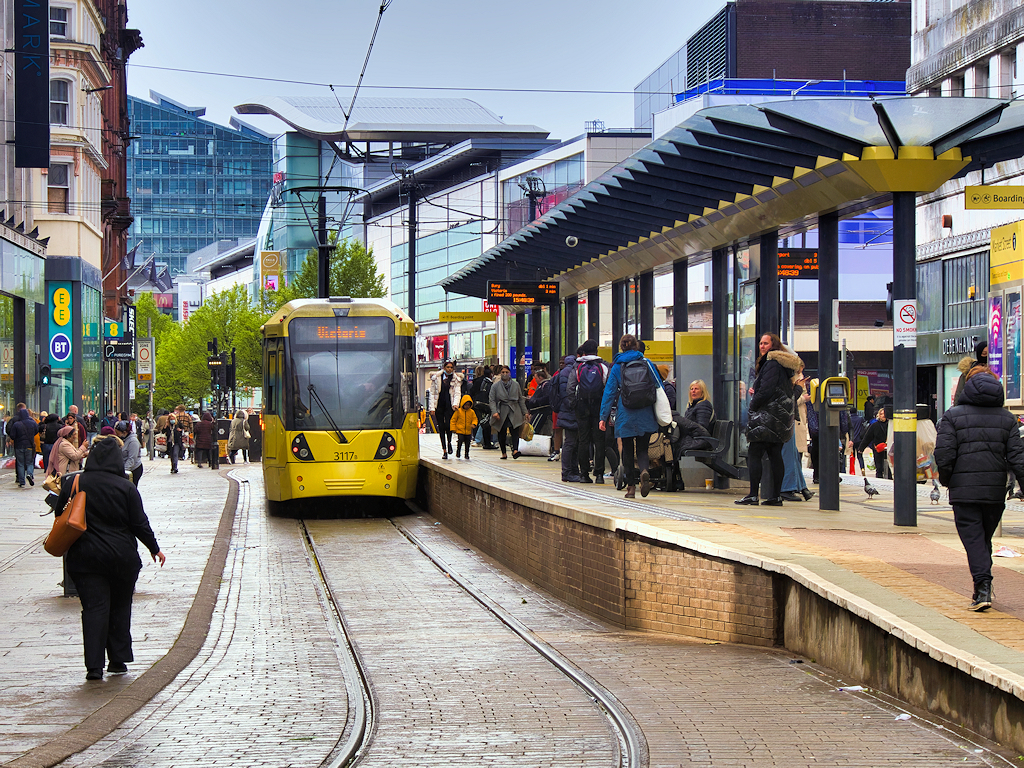
Market Street tram stop in the city centre

There are 99 tram stops on Metrolink, as of 2023. Low-floor platforms commonly used for light rail throughout the world were ruled out for Metrolink because the system inherited 90-centimetre (35 in) high-floor platforms from British Rail on lines formerly used for heavy rail. The first stops on the Bury Line and Altrincham Line, opened in phase one, were formerly railway stations and were changed little from British Rail days, as available funding only allowed minimum upgrades to be made. When the Oldham and Rochdale Line was converted from a railway, however, all of the former railway stations were completely rebuilt.

Some stops, such as Cornbrook, are shared between lines and may be used as interchange stations; others, such as Altrincham Interchange, or Ashton-under-Lyne are transport hubs that integrate with heavy rail and bus stations.

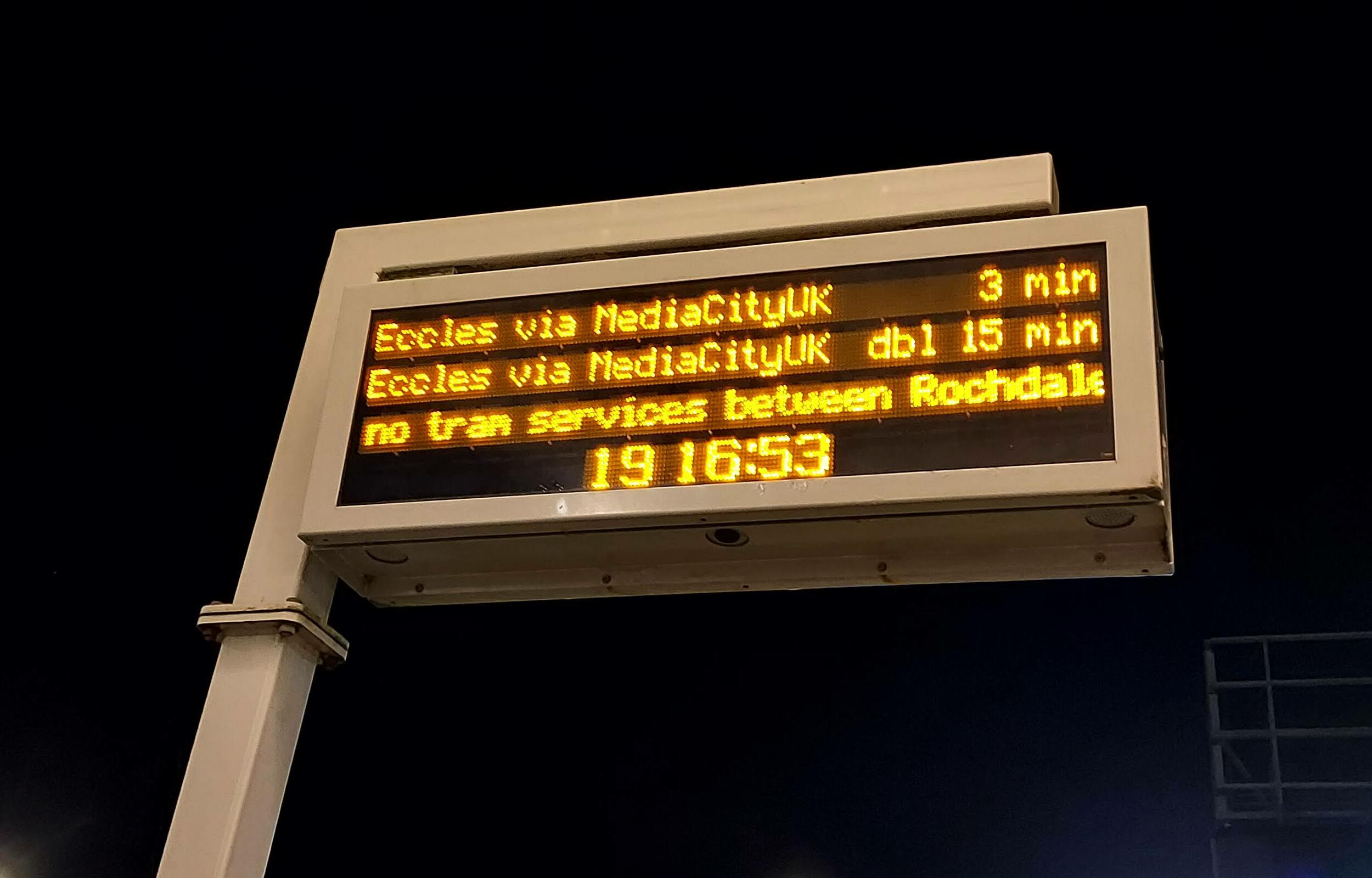
Estimated arrival time shown at stations

Metrolink stops are unstaffed. Each contains at least two ticket vending machines, except for Pomona which only has one. Card readers are installed on all stop platforms for use with contactless pay-as-you-go, the TfGM Bee Card smart card, and concessionary passes. All card users are required to touch-in at these platform readers before commencing their journey and to touch-out at their final destination. Stops are provided with help/emergency call points to enable passengers to speak to control. Each stop is monitored by CCTV for public safety, and the images are continuously recorded. Route maps and general information are provided on each platform. Each stop has at least one high-floor platform measuring a minimum of 2 metres (6.6 ft) wide, accessed by ramp, stairs, escalator, lift or combination thereof. Shelters and canopies at stops were supplied by JCDecaux, and ticket vending machines by Scheidt & Bachmann.

=== Power supply ===
The trams are electrically powered from 750 V DC overhead lines. Between 1992 and 2007, electricity for the Metrolink system was procured by the operator, based on price only. In 2007, GMPTE changed the contractual requirements to ensure that sustainable power would be factored into choosing an energy supplier, and in July 2007, Metrolink became the first light rail network in the UK with electricity supplied entirely from sustainable energy via hydropower. Now, energy for the system is generated by biomass.

=== Signalling ===
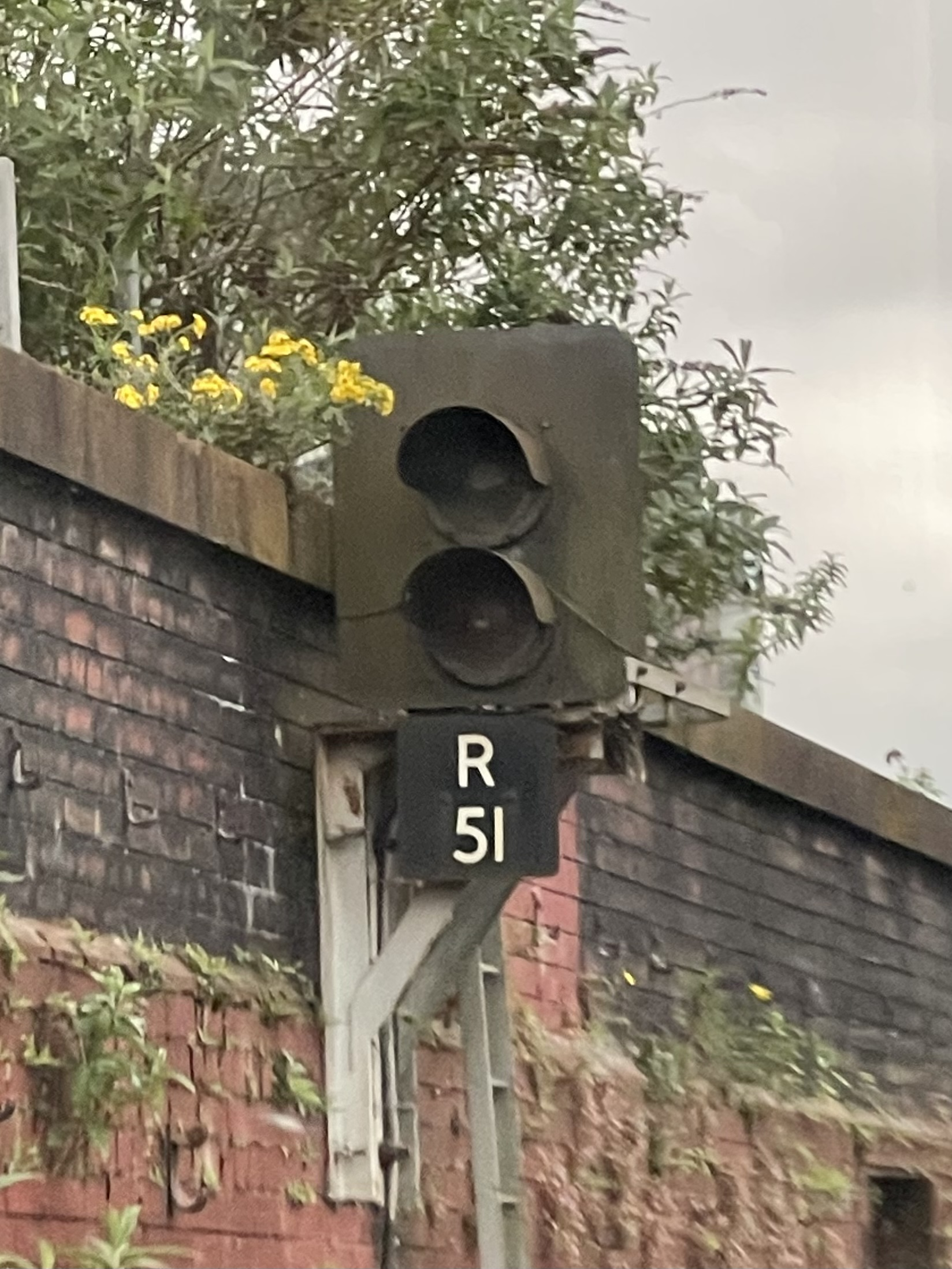
Disused Two Aspect Repeater Signal near Victoria tram stop

The Metrolink operated using two types of signals during Phase 1 and Phase 2, Line Of Sight signals and Two Aspect colour signals. These signals were controlled with a device called the Vehicle Recognition System (VRS) inside the cab of the tram, which sent information to the control room via a pair of coils on the un-motored centre bogie. In preparation for Phase 3, a new device was introduced called the Tram Management System (TMS) as the Two Aspect colour signals would not be able to support the headway between trams (zero minutes) and the level of flexibility required for the new lines.

This meant that every line would become fully Line Of Sight. The Two Aspect colour signals were removed between 2012 and 2022 as more lines were being converted to Line Of Sight. The only section of the Metrolink network that cannot be converted to Line Of Sight signalling is on the Altrincham Line between Timperley–Altrincham, as that section is under Network Rail control.

=== Depots ===
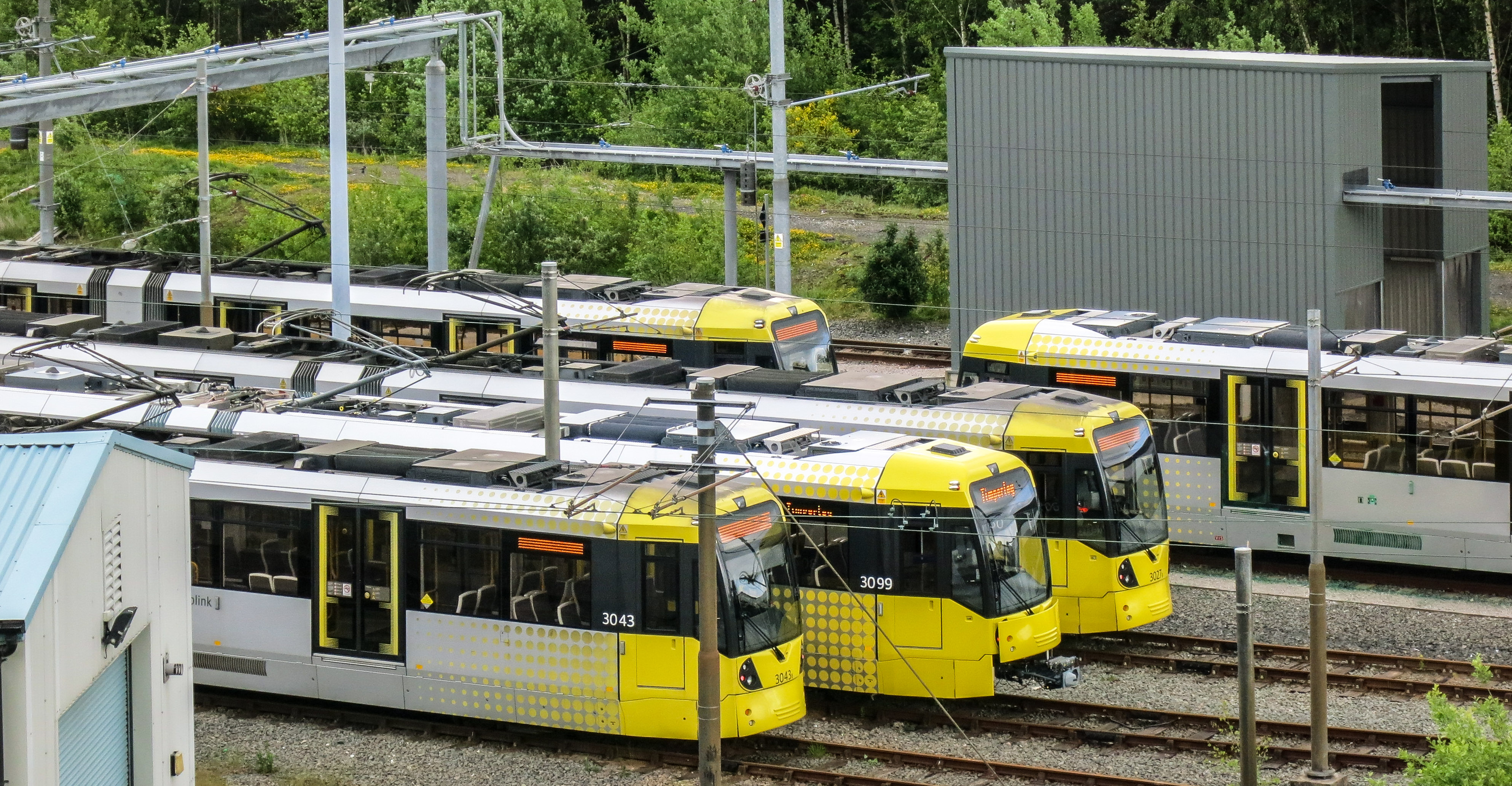
Bombardier M5000 trams stabled at the Queens Road depot

Metrolink has two depots, at Queens Road and Old Trafford: the Metrolink House at Queens Road in Cheetham Hill was the original headquarters of Metrolink. Constructed during Phase 1 alongside the Bury Line, it served jointly as a control centre, HQ, office space, and depot for the storage, maintenance and repair of vehicles. Under the original proposals, Metrolink House was intended to be much larger, with a design which would support network expansion, but this design did not obtain the necessary planning permission from Manchester City Council. Consequently, Metrolink House was scaled down to a 4-hectare (9.9-acre) £8 million site with limited capacity, and, in light of the Phase 3a network expansion, the second depot in Old Trafford was built in 2011. This second depot, adjacent to the Old Trafford tram stop, occupies the site of a former warehouse and can stable up to 96 vehicles, it also has a washing plant and maintenance workshops. On 7 May 2013 Metrolink completed the transfer of its main operational functions from Queens Road to Old Trafford, meaning its control room – known as the Network Management Centre – is housed jointly with the Customer Services team by its newer depot.

== Fares and ticketing ==
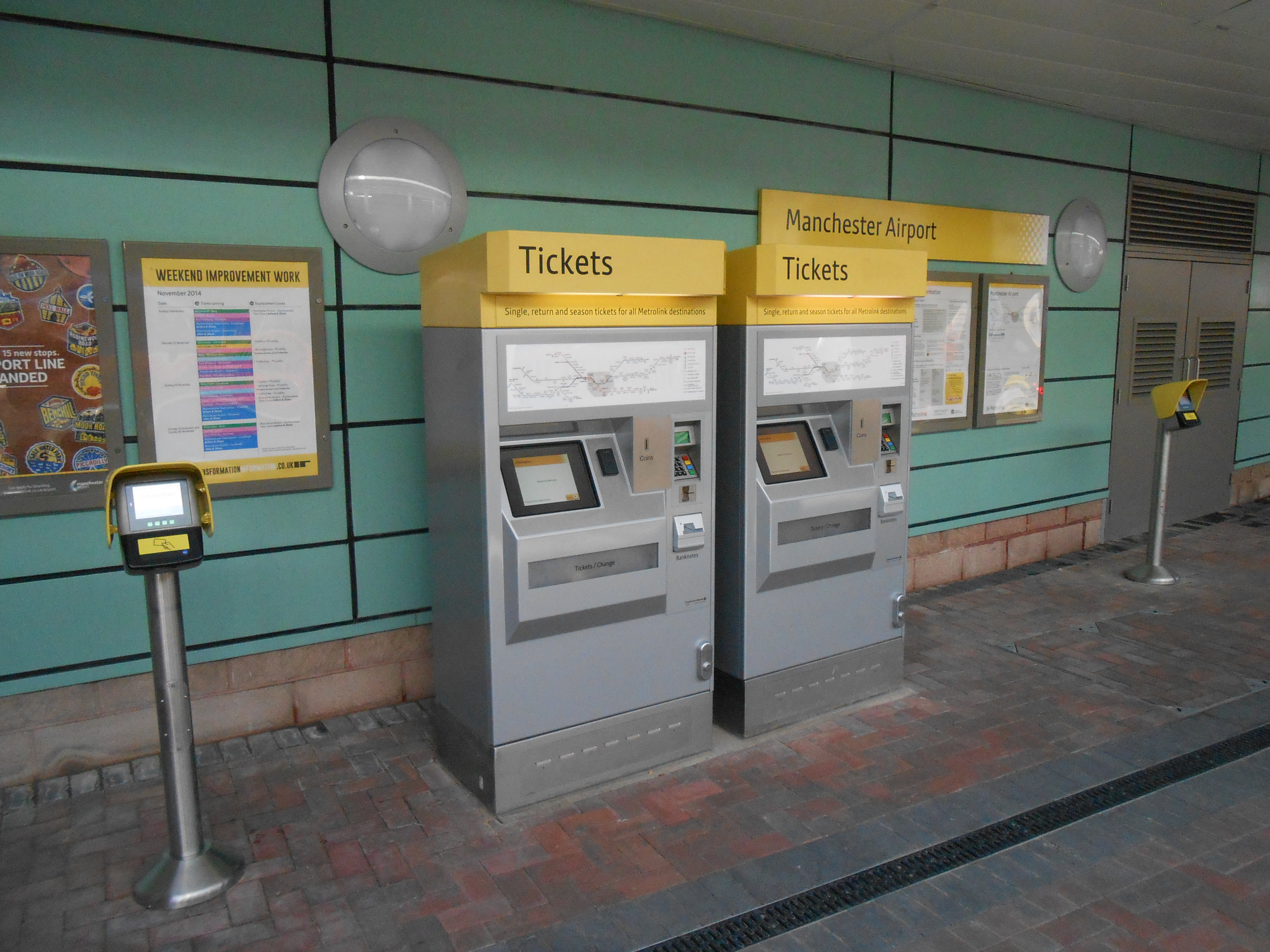
Metrolink smart readers and ticket vending machines at Manchester Airport

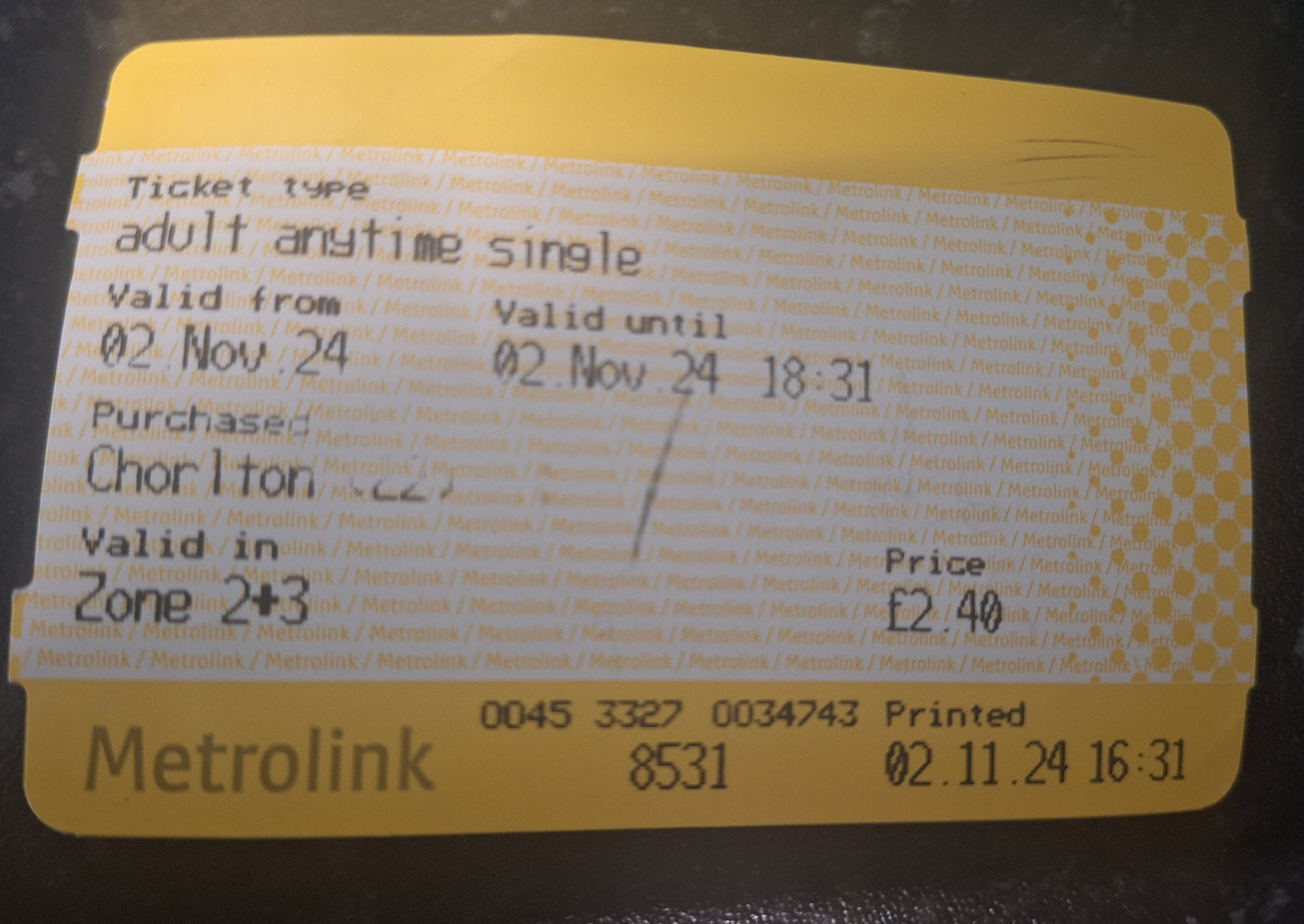
A Metrolink adult anytime single paper ticket

Metrolink fares were initially set by the system's operator, but are now set by the TfGM Committee at levels that cover both the running costs and the cost of borrowing that has part-funded the expansion of the system; Metrolink receives no public subsidy. Fares typically rise each January above the rate of inflation, but have been frozen since the last change in 2020. The fare tariff is based on a division of the network's stops into fare zones. Persons under five years of age may travel on the Metrolink for free. Persons under 16 years of age, of pensionable age or with disabilities qualify for concessionary fares, some of which are mandatory and others discretionary, as determined by the Greater Manchester Combined Authority. The Greater Manchester Combined Authority permits reduced fares for persons under 16 years of age, and free or reduced fares on Metrolink after 9:30 a.m. for pensioners. In normal circumstances, tickets cannot be purchased on board Metrolink vehicles and must be purchased from a ticket vending machine before boarding the vehicle.

Fare evasion in 2006 was estimated at 2–6% of all users and, in 2012, at 2.5% of all users. Checking tickets and passes and issuing Standard fares (similar to penalty fare) is the responsibility of Metrolink's Passenger Services Representatives (PSRs), which provides security and assistance on the network; between 1992 and 2008, Greater Manchester Police had a dedicated Metrolink unit responsible for policing the system. The amount of ticket inspectors onboard trams was increased following the Bee Network's launch in September 2023, and the penalty for evading fares also increased.

Thorn EMI designed the original ticket vending machines. In 2005, GMPTE announced that rail passengers travelling from within Greater Manchester into Manchester city centre could use the Metrolink service in the City Zone for free. Passengers must present a valid rail ticket, correctly dated with Manchester Ctlz as the destination.

In 2007. TfGM rolled out new ticket vending machines, designed to accept credit/debit card payments and permit the purchase of multiple tickets in a single transaction. These were replaced in 2009 with touchscreen machines, designed with the Scheidt & Bachmann Ticket XPress system.

In October 2012, TfGM announced it was devising a more straightforward zonal fare system, comparable to London fare zones, and preparing to introduce get me there, the region's new contactless smartcard system, for use on all public transport modes in Greater Manchester, including Metrolink. After years of consultation, a new system using four concentric zones was implemented on 13 January 2019. From 15 July 2019, a new contactless pay-as-you-go service began, allowing passengers to tap in and out on smart readers using their contactless bank cards. Contactless fares were originally capped to no more than the cost of the equivalent daily travelcard. In September 2021 an additional weekly cap was introduced.

== Services ==
=== Accessibility ===
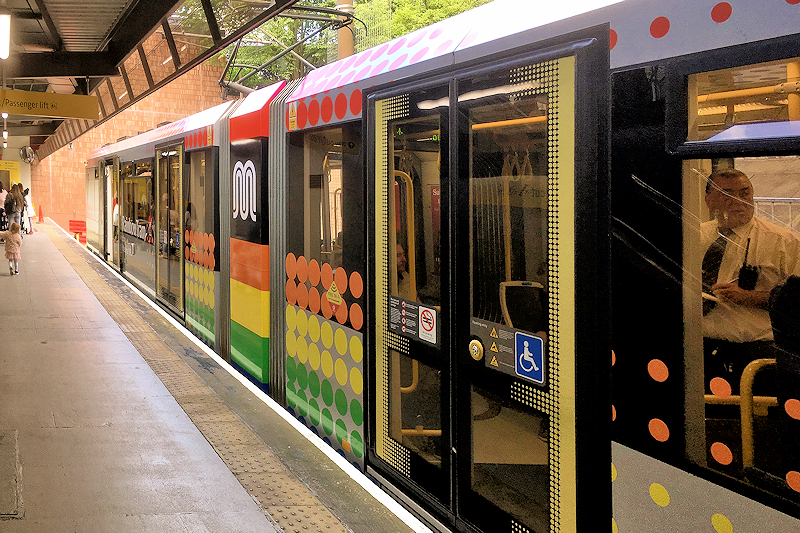
High platforms result in easy boarding

Metrolink trams and stops have been designed to be accessible to disabled passengers: each stop has been provided with access ramps or lifts, tactile paving, high visibility handrails, disabled boarding points, and help points on the platforms. The trams have also been designed with large areas available for the provision of wheelchairs and pushchairs.

However, this access was not in the original plans (which were based on tram-side extending steps and low-level platforms in the city centre) and accessibility took four years of concerted campaigning by disabled people in Greater Manchester from 1984 to 1988, and particularly the efforts of Neville Strowger, a disabled person working as the access officer at Manchester City Council, and a founding member of the Greater Manchester Coalition of Disabled People. The campaign was to change the design policy to create full access, including retrofitting access to the legacy train stations on the Bury line and the Altrincham line. An early milestone in the campaign was a large meeting between GMPTE officers and around 70 disabled people at County Hall on 22 November 1984, including a speech from the invited disability rights campaigner Vic Finkelstein. A further key meeting was in May 1987 with over 100 disabled people and elected Councillor Guy Harkin as Chair of GMPTA plus other officials, but the policy in 1987 that was repeated at this meeting was that access would only be possible "if the budget allows." Full access was finally agreed in the summer of 1988, and productive meetings followed with disabled people on the implementation details. This campaigning was researched in detail starting in 2019 and written up in an 8-page pamphlet in February 2020.

Mobility scooters were initially banned from Metrolink. However, in 2014 a scheme was introduced whereby scooters could be allowed on trams, provided they have a permit which can be obtained after an assessment of the scooter's size and manoeuvrability.

Currently the Metrolink operator company consults with a group of disabled people, via TfGM's relationship with the independent Disability Design Reference Group, on any proposed changes to the services or infrastructure.

Well-behaved dogs are allowed but must be kept on leads, with other conditions.

=== Bicycle policy ===
Metrolink does not allow full-sized bicycles on to trams, but does permit the carriage of "fully covered" folding bicycles. The ban on non-folding bicycles was upheld in 2010, despite a campaign by cycling and green groups for the trams to be adapted to allow them. Campaigners against the policy had argued that the ban on bicycles was anomalous, as other large objects such as ironing boards and deckchairs were allowed on the trams under current rules.

=== Wi-fi ===
In July 2013, the Transport for Greater Manchester Committee announced that it planned to enhance the experience of travelling on Metrolink by tapping into Manchester City Council's grant from the UK Urban Broadband Fund and using it to provide Metrolink passengers with free wi-fi when on board. The scheme began with a trial on a single tram – number 3054 – connected to the FreeBeeMcr broadband network with the intention of rolling it out across the whole Metrolink network by spring 2015. It was rolled out fleet wide in March 2015. On board Wi-Fi was later suspended indefinitely in March 2020.

== Corporate affairs ==
=== Ownership and structure ===
Manchester Metrolink is owned by TfGM, and is currently operated and maintained by KeolisAmey, which was awarded the contract for a period of up to ten years from 15 July 2017.

Between 1992 and 1997, Metrolink was operated and maintained as a concession by Greater Manchester Metro Limited, and between 1997 and 2007 by Serco. When next tendered, a ten-year contract was awarded to the Stagecoach Group from 15 July 2007. On 1 August 2011, RATP Group bought the balance of the contract from Stagecoach.

In January 2017, the Keolis/Amey consortium was announced as the successful bidder for the operating and maintenance (O&M) contract to run from 15 July 2017. Unsuccessful competing bidders were RATP, National Express and Transdev. KeolisAmey Metrolink's contract was later extended until July 2027.

=== Business trends ===
The key trends in recent years for Manchester Metrolink are (years ending 31 March):

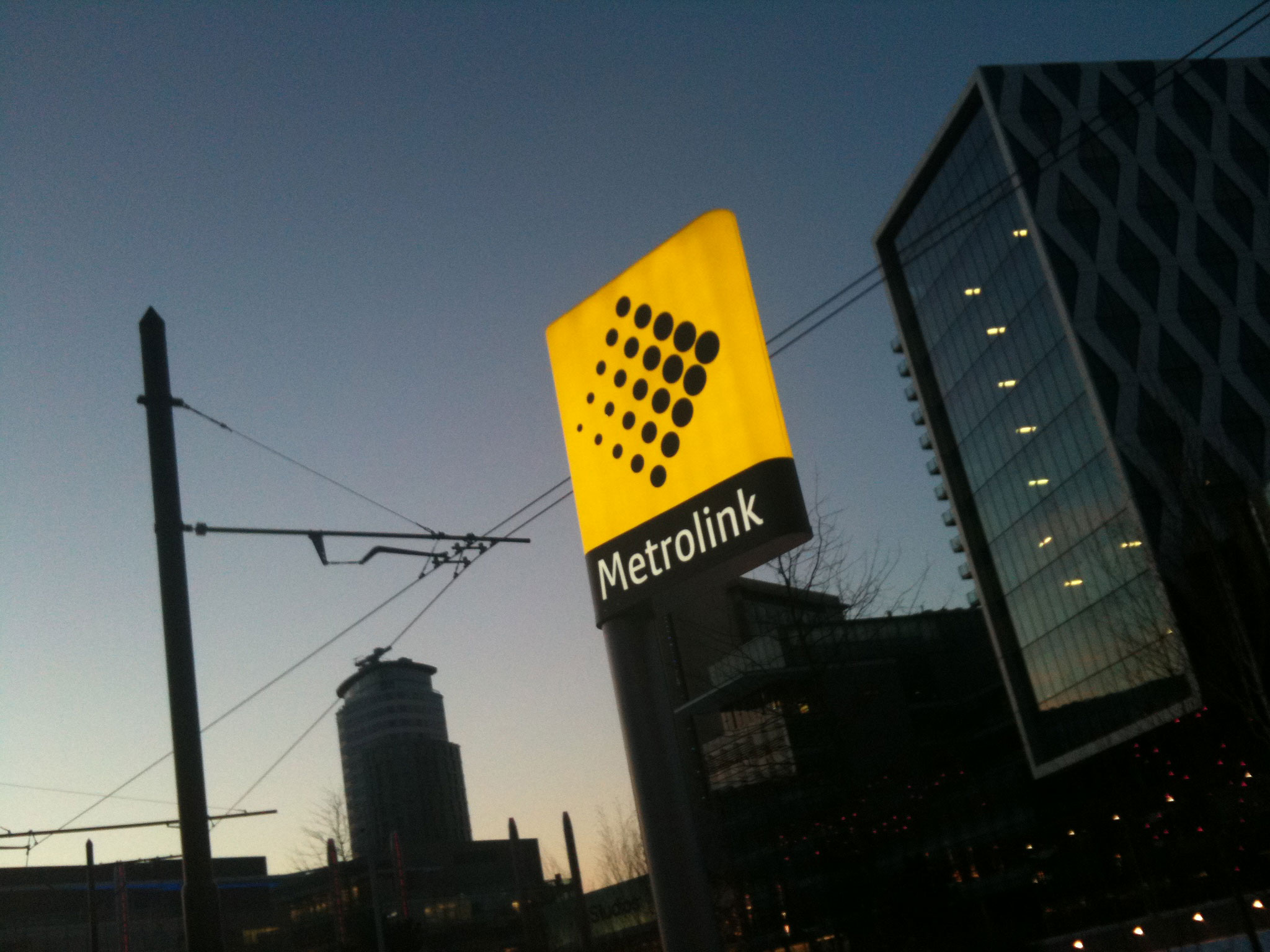
Metrolink stops are marked with yellow totems, such as this one at MediaCityUK

	2014	2015	2016	2017	2018	2019	2020	2021	2022	2023	2024	2025
Passenger revenue (Note: As defined in the DfT Light Rail and Tram Survey (Table LRT0301a)) (£m)	51.8	56.8	62.4	67.3	74.8	82.1	82.6	26.8	52.6	70.5	81.1	84.3
'Profit' ("Net expenditure") (Note: As defined in TfGM's annual Comprehensive Income and Expenditure Statements) (£m), includes capital investment in infrastructure renewals and improvements to the existing network			−7.13	0.58	−5.20	−1.96	−5.16	−2.20	-1.06	-11.72	-11.75	-26.51
Number of passengers (Note: Passenger journeys, as defined in the DfT Light Rail and Tram Survey (Table LRT0101)) (M)	29.2	31.2	34.3	37.8	41.2	43.7	44.3	10.3	26.0	36.0	42.0	46.0
Number of trams (at year end)	93	109	120	120	120	120	120	124	137	147	147	147
Notes/sources												

Activities in the financial year 2020/21 were severely reduced by the impact of the coronavirus pandemic; the shortfall in fare income was funded by a grant from the UK central government's Department for Transport.

=== Passenger numbers ===
Detailed passenger journeys since Metrolink commenced operations in 1992 were:

Estimated passenger journeys (millions) made on Metrolink per financial year
Year	Passenger journeys	Year	Passenger journeys	Year	Passenger journeys	Year	Passenger journeys	Year	Passenger journeys
1992–93	8.1	1999–00	14.2	2006–07	19.8	2013–14	29.2	2020–21	10.3
1993–94	11.3	2000–01	17.2	2007–08	20.0	2014–15	31.2	2021–22	26.0
1994–95	12.3	2001–02	18.2	2008–09	21.1	2015–16	34.3	2022–23	36.0
1995–96	12.6	2002–03	18.8	2009–10	19.6	2016–17	37.8	2023–24	42.0
1996–97	13.4	2003–04	18.9	2010–11	19.2	2017–18	41.2	2024-25	46.0
1997–98	13.8	2004–05	19.7	2011–12	21.8	2018–19	43.7		
1998–99	13.2	2005–06	19.9	2012–13	25.0	2019–20	44.3		
Estimates provided by TfGM to the Department for Transport, based on sales from ticket machines. (Note: Estimates excludes free travel, such as the concessionary bus pass for pensioners and tickets sold through other vendors.)

Manchester Metrolink passenger numbers from 1992 to 2024/5 View source data.

Metrolink revised its method for calculating passenger boardings in 2010/11, meaning figures are not directly comparable with previous years.

A survey in 2012 revealed that 12% of people in Greater Manchester use Metrolink to travel to work, and 8% use the system every day. The system is most commonly used by 21- to 30-year-olds, and was used most markedly by residents of the Metropolitan Borough of Bury — accounting for around a third of their commuter journeys.

Passenger numbers were severely reduced due to the impact of the COVID-19 pandemic, decreasing by 76.7% in the year 2020/21. In the year 2021/22, passenger numbers were still significantly below the level achieved before the pandemic.

=== Passenger satisfaction ===
A survey in 2012 revealed that passengers who used Metrolink every day for commuting rated service levels as poor and/or unreliable, with those respondents particularly frustrated by delays and disruptions. TfGM recognised that the older vehicles in its fleet – the T68/T68As — were outdated and the cause of much disruption, and agreed to replace them with M5000s by 2014. Among those who used Metrolink less regularly, the system scored far better in the survey. A survey in 2013 by the non-departmental government body Passenger Focus found that of the five major light rail systems in the United Kingdom – Metrolink, Sheffield Supertram, Nottingham Express Transit, Midlands Metro and Blackpool tramway – Metrolink had the lowest overall satisfaction rating in the United Kingdom. Respondents were surveyed on value for money, punctuality, seating availability, tram stops and overall satisfaction. Metrolink was below average on all criteria, and 47% believed Metrolink was value for money compared to a national average of 60%.

Subsequent surveys have shown increases in passenger satisfaction. A further survey in late 2015 by watchdog Transport Focus, found that satisfaction levels had increased; 89% of passengers surveyed said they were either 'very' or 'fairly' satisfied with their overall journey, up from 83% in 2013, but still below the national average of 92%. It also found that 58% felt the service was value for money. The national average rating for value for money on all tram networks was 69%. The follow-up survey in 2016 found further improvements, with 90% of respondents reporting they were either 'very' or 'fairly' satisfied with their overall journey, compared to the national average of 93%. 62% now felt the service was value for money, against a national average still of 69%, which although improved was still the lowest ranking of the six systems covered by the survey. In early 2020, another survey was conducted, finding that 59% felt Metrolink was value for money.

=== Corporate identity ===
The Metrolink logo device

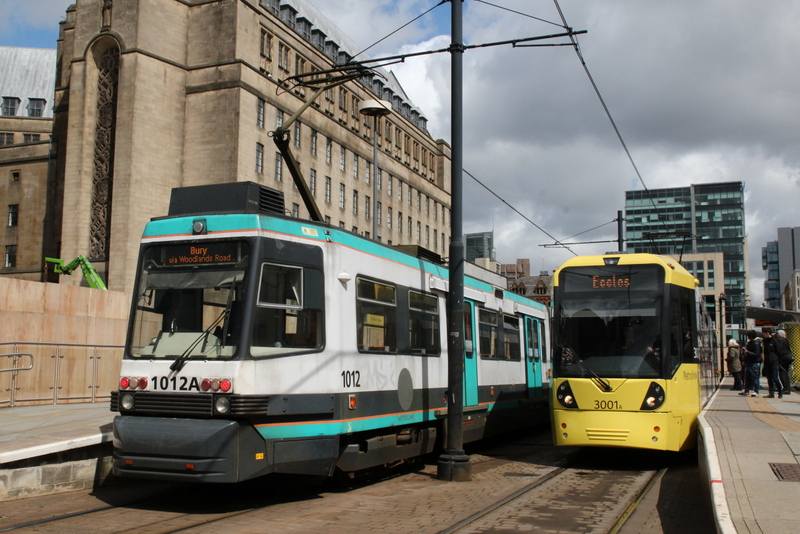
Brand transition: AnsaldoBreda T-68 and Bombardier M5000 trams, in the old and new liveries, 2013

The standard corporate identity across the Metrolink system uses a pale yellow and metallic silver colour scheme, with a logotype that consists of a diamond motif, formed from a pattern of repeating circles and the Metrolink name. The logo, signage and publicity use the Pantograph sans regular typeface. Tram livery features yellow at the vehicle ends, with grey sides and black doors, and a pattern of circles.

The corporate identity was created in October 2008 by Hemisphere Design & Marketing Consultants of Manchester, in collaboration with designer Peter Saville and the transport design agency Design Triangle. The Pantograph typeface was specially commissioned from the Dalton Maag type foundry. The design standard was applied to the Metrolink network when the new M5000 trams were introduced to the network. Hemisphere chose yellow for its high visibility and to reflect Greater Manchester's culture of confidence and optimism.

When the Metrolink network first came into operation in 1992, it used a system-wide colour scheme and vehicle livery of aquamarine, black and grey, along with a stylised "M" monogram placed at an angle within a circle. This branding, along with the Metrolink brand name, was devised by Fitch RS and Design Triangle, and first revealed at a press launch in June 1988. Before this, during the planning stage, the system was known as "Light Rapid Transit" (LRT) and promotional material used an orange and brown identity used by Greater Manchester Transport and GM Buses.

=== Public relations ===
Transport planners in Greater Manchester describe Metrolink as both "an icon of Greater Manchester", and "an integral part of the landscape in Greater Manchester." The Guardian describes Metrolink as "Manchester's efficient and much-loved tram system". Under the ownership of the Guardian Media Group, the Manchester Evening News spearheaded the Get Our Metrolink Back on Track campaign in 2004–05. Under Trinity Mirror's ownership, the Manchester Evening News used the Freedom of Information Act 2000 to reveal that Metrolink received over 10,000 complaints between May 2011 and May 2012.

Metrolink has had close connections with popular culture in Manchester and has taken advantage of the city's strong associations with football culture. It has been a Football Development Partner with the Manchester Football Association since August 2010, meaning it is the association's Official Travel Partner and supports grassroots association football in Greater Manchester by selecting a "Team of the Month".

In 2013, then Manchester City manager Roberto Mancini and players Joe Hart, Vincent Kompany and James Milner recorded special stop announcements to be used on Metrolink's East Manchester Line on dates when Manchester City play at home at the City of Manchester Stadium (served by the Etihad Campus tram stop). The announcements were first used on 17 February 2013, for Manchester City's FA Cup fifth-round tie against Leeds United

Metrolink is a sponsor of the annual Manchester Food and Drink Festival.

== Future developments ==
Many speculative expansion proposals exist for new lines and stops, including the addition of tram-train technology. The following proposals are those which are currently undergoing business case development by TfGM, with a likelihood to begin construction in or before 2030..

=== Oldham-Rochdale-Heywood-Bury tram-train ===
As part of efforts to introduce tram-trains — vehicles that can operate on both light and heavy rail networks — the Greater Manchester Combined Authority (GMCA) proposed three options for initial pathfinder schemes to test the application in Greater Manchester. One of these schemes, Pathfinder North, was submitted for funding as part of the government's City Region Sustainable Transport Settlement (CRSTS) fund. Pathfinder North proposes a new tram-train service from Oldham on Metrolink's Oldham & Rochdale line, connecting to the local heavy rail network at Rochdale, and continuing on to Heywood and Bury Interchange on an existing heritage railway.

In July 2022, the GMCA received confirmation of initial funding to develop the pathfinder, including the purchase of up to seven new tram-train vehicles to run the service.

A £2.5 billion 'funding boost' to the area's transport network from the UK Government ensured that this link will be delivered by 2030, with a target start date of construction in 2028. The line would be the first orbital (Note: i.e. It does not enter Manchester city centre.) Metrolink route.

=== East Didsbury to Stockport expansion ===
An extension of the existing spur to East Didsbury, from the Manchester Airport line, will make its way to Stockport, terminating at the newly completed Stockport Interchange, which has space for a number of Metrolink platforms. The line would cross both the River Mersey and the M60 motorway, before it reaches Stockport, requiring a number of potentially expensive over or underground crossings. It is thought that the cost of construction would exceed the cost of the Trafford Park line, which was £350 million. Construction is hoped to begin in 2030..

=== HS2 integration ===
As part of (now rejected) developments related to bringing High Speed 2 and Northern Powerhouse Rail to Manchester, High Speed Two Limited had proposed the present two-platform Piccadilly Metrolink stop at ground-level below the existing station platforms be relocated.

A new larger four-platform stop located underground below the Manchester Piccadilly High Speed station was planned to replace it. Provision for a second ground-level Metrolink stop at the eastern end of the high speed station to service future Metrolink extensions, to be called Piccadilly Central, also formed part of the plans. At the proposed Manchester Airport High Speed station provision for a new Metrolink stop — potentially serving an extension from the existing Airport line — was also envisaged.

== In popular culture ==
Metrolink has also featured in television drama. On 6 December 2010, the soap opera Coronation Street featured a storyline with an explosion which caused a crash on the Metrolink system at Weatherfield. The episode was written to celebrate its 50th anniversary. Although a fictitious event, at least six calls were made to GMPTE asking if services had been affected.

== See also ==
- History of Manchester Metrolink
- List of tram and light-rail transit systems
- Manchester Corporation Tramways
- Transport in Manchester
- List of town tramway systems in England
- List of town tramway systems in the United Kingdom.
