= Dane Road tram stop =

Metrolink stop in South Manchester

Dane Road
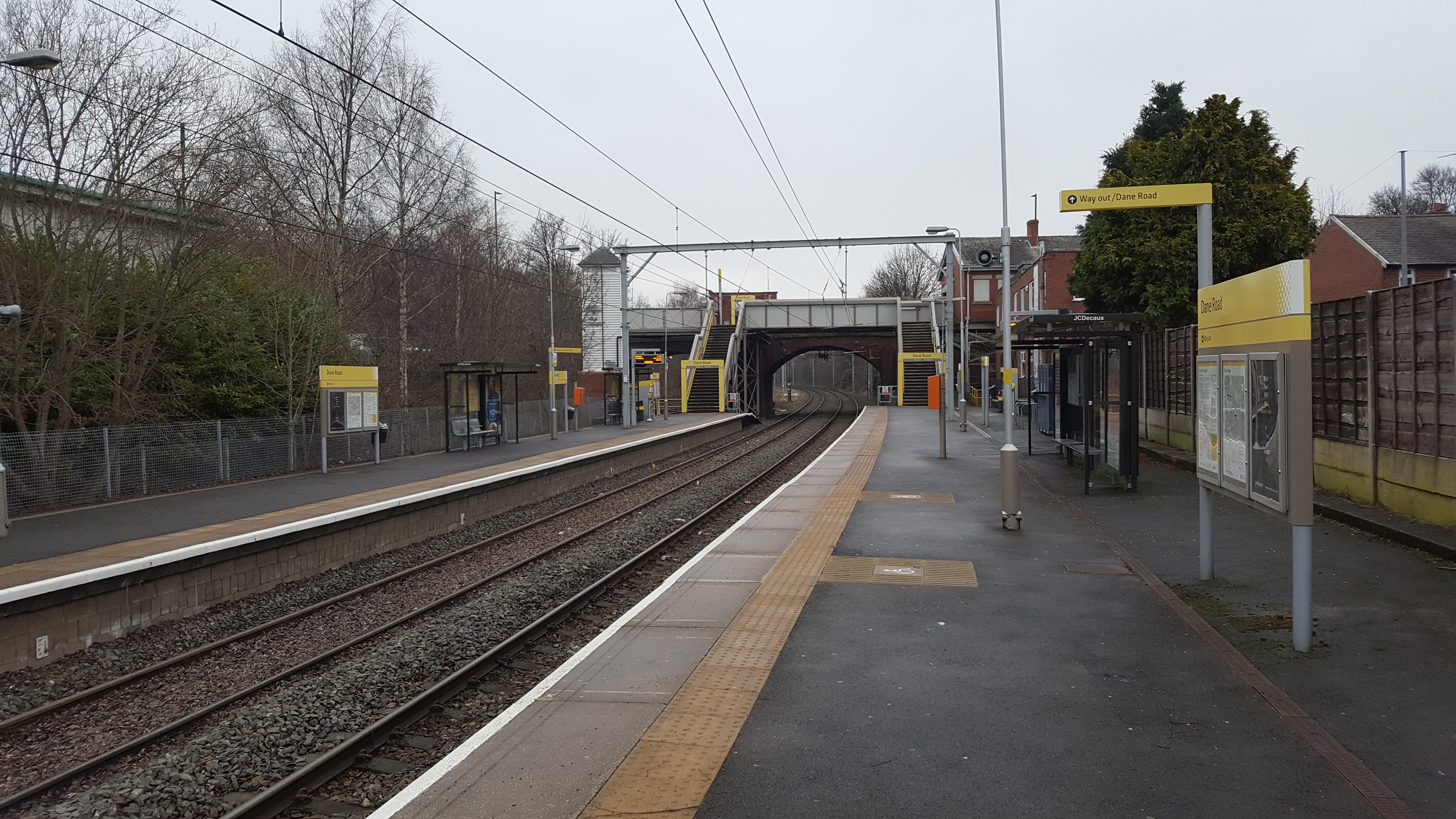
- Dane Road tram stop in January 2017

General information
- Location: Sale, Trafford; England
- Coordinates: 53.43010°N 2.31154°W
- Grid reference: SJ793926
- System: Metrolink station
- Line: Altrincham Line
- Platforms: 2

Other information
- Status: In operation
- Fare zone: 2

History
- Opened: 20 July 1931
- Former names: Dane Road (Sale)
- Original company: MSJAR
- Post-grouping: MSJAR; London Midland Region of British Railways

Key dates
- 24 December 1991: Closed as a rail station
- 15 June 1992: Conversion to Metrolink operation
Route map
Location

Dane Road is a tram stop on the Altrincham Line of Greater Manchester's Metrolink light rail system. It is located on Dane Road in northern Sale, Greater Manchester, England. It opened on 15 June 1992 as part of Phase 1 of Metrolink's expansion.

== History ==
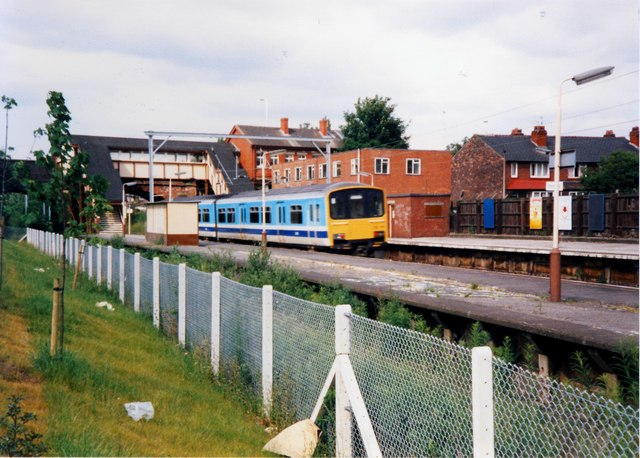
Dane Road railway station in 1988

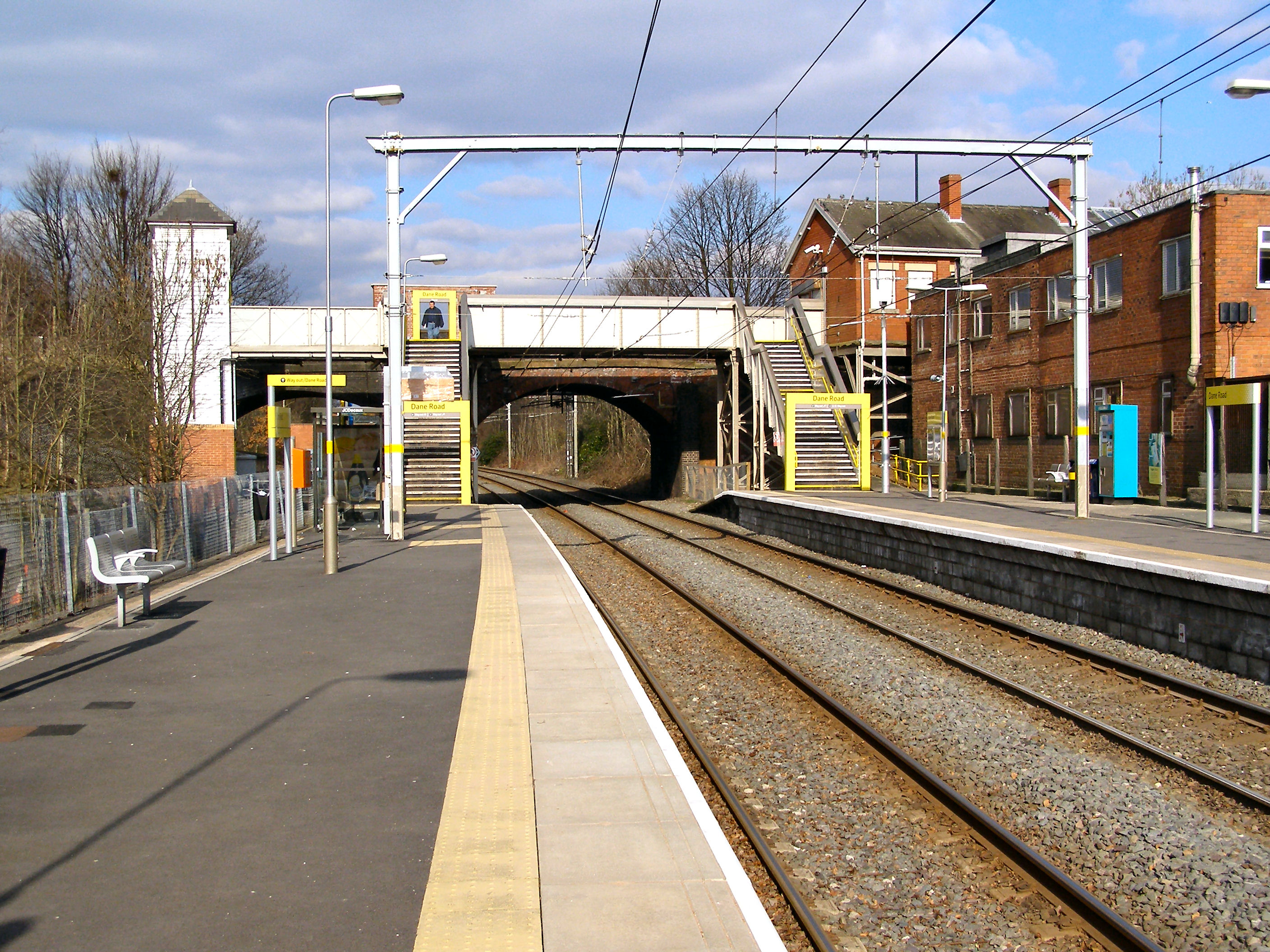
Dane Road tram stop in 2010

The station originally opened on 20 July 1931 by the Manchester, South Junction and Altrincham Railway (MSJAR) and was referred to as Dane Road (Sale) on early tickets and timetables. It was operated as a four-platform station from opening until 1963. Dane Road closed as a British Rail station on 24 December 1991 for conversion to Metrolink operation, where it reopened for Metrolink service on 15 June 1992.

== Services ==
Dane Road is on the Altrincham Line, with trams towards Altrincham stopping every 6 minutes during the day, Monday to Saturday, every 12 minutes Monday to Saturday evenings and Sundays. Trams also head towards Manchester and Bury, with the Monday to Saturday daytime service running every 12 minutes each to Piccadilly or Bury, while evening and Sunday journeys run to Piccadilly only.

=== Service pattern ===
- 10 trams per hour to Altrincham (5 off-peak)
- 5 trams per hour to Bury (peak only)
- 5 trams per hour to Piccadilly

=== Ticket zones ===
As of January 2019, Dane Road is located in Metrolink ticket zone 3.

== Connecting bus routes ==
Dane Road station is not served by any bus service, with the nearest service being Finglands/Stagecoach Manchester service 99, which stop further along Dane Road and runs to Sale and to Manchester via Northenden.

Preceding station	Manchester Metrolink	Following station
Sale towards Altrincham	Altrincham–Bury (peak only)	Stretford towards Bury
Sale towards Altrincham	Altrincham–Piccadilly	Stretford towards Piccadilly
