= Stretford tram stop =

Manchester Metrolink tram stop

Stretford
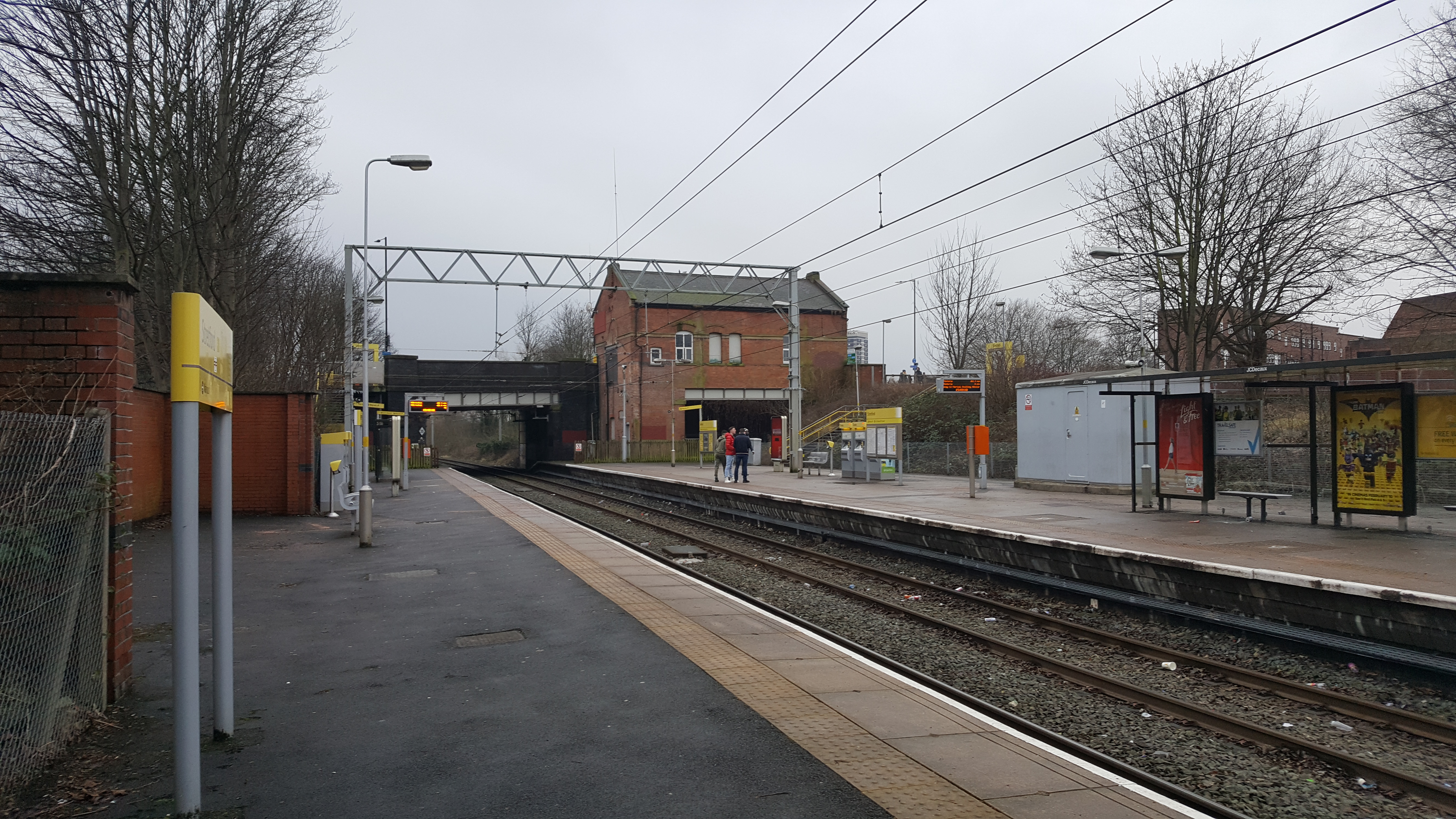
- Stretford tram stop in January 2017.

General information
- Location: Stretford, Trafford; England
- Coordinates: 53.44600°N 2.30384°W
- Grid reference: SJ799944
- System: Metrolink station
- Line: Altrincham Line
- Platforms: 2

Other information
- Status: In operation
- Fare zone: 2/3

History
- Opened: 20 July 1849
- Former names: Edge Lane
- Original company: MSJAR
- Pre-grouping: MSJAR
- Post-grouping: MSJAR; London Midland Region of British Railways

Key dates
- 24 December 1991: Closed as a rail station
- 15 June 1992: Conversion to Metrolink operation
- September 1849: Renamed
Route map
Location

Stretford is a tram stop on the Altrincham Line of Greater Manchester's light-rail Metrolink system. It is located in Stretford, on the corner of Chester Road and Edge Lane. It opened on 15 June 1992 as part of Phase 1 of Metrolink's expansion.

The stop was formerly Stretford railway station, a regional rail station which was opened by the Manchester South Junction and Altrincham Railway (MSJAR) as Edge Lane railway station on 20 July 1849, was renamed to Stretford in September 1849, and closed on 24 December 1991 for conversion from heavy rail to light rail.

== Facilities ==
There is a large car park for the tram stop on the Manchester-bound platform. Each platform has ticket machines, a waiting shelter and a dot-matrix indicator. There is step-free access for both platforms from Edge Lane and both platforms have a touch-in/out point. There is a bike rack at the station. There is a road bridge over the tracks. This is the only route from one platform to the other.

== History ==
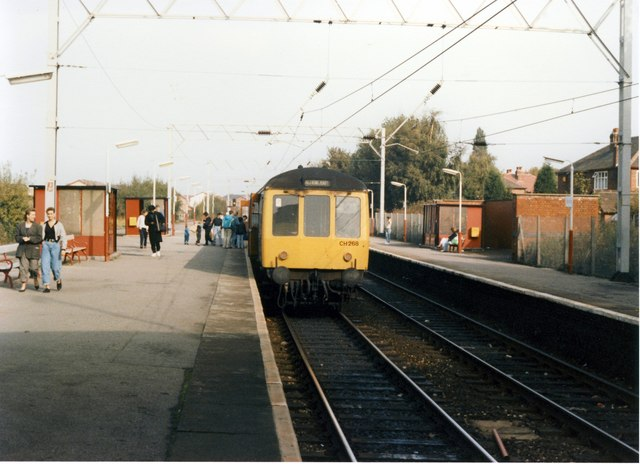
Stretford station in 1988

The station originally opened as Edge Lane on 20 July 1849 by the MSJAR (not to be confused with Edge Lane tram stop), and was renamed Stretford in September 1849. The station operated as a four-platform station from 1904 to 1963. Stretford closed as a British Rail station on 24 December 1991 for conversion to Metrolink, and reopened for Metrolink services on 15 June 1992.

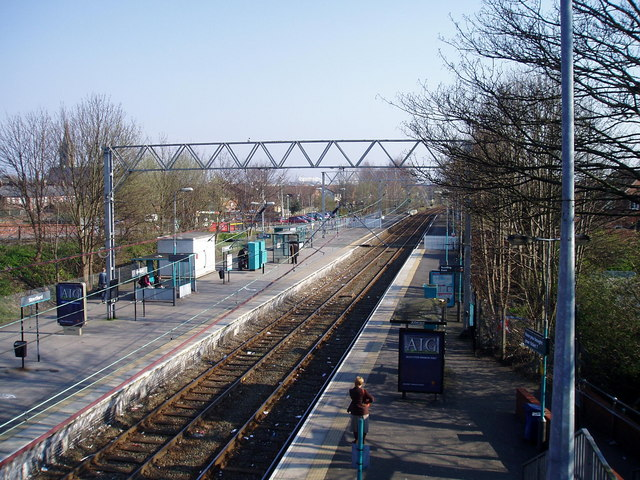
Stretford tram stop in 2007 prior to refurbishment

== Services ==
Services run every 12 minutes on all routes. Some routes (as indicated) only operate during peak times.

Preceding station	Manchester Metrolink	Following station
Dane Road towards Altrincham	Altrincham–Bury (peak only)	Old Trafford towards Bury
Dane Road towards Altrincham	Altrincham–Piccadilly	Old Trafford towards Piccadilly

== Connecting bus routes ==
The station is served by:

- Stagecoach Manchester service 15, which runs to Flixton via Urmston and Davyhulme and to Manchester via Hulme.
- Stagecoach services 23/23A to the Trafford Centre and to Stockport via Chorlton.
- M Travel service 276, which runs to Trafford General Hospital via Urmston and to West Didsbury via Chorlton.

There are also several services which stop at nearby Stretford Mall, which can connect onto the Metrolink at Stretford.
