= Pomona tram stop =

Metrolink tram stop in Manchester, England

Pomona
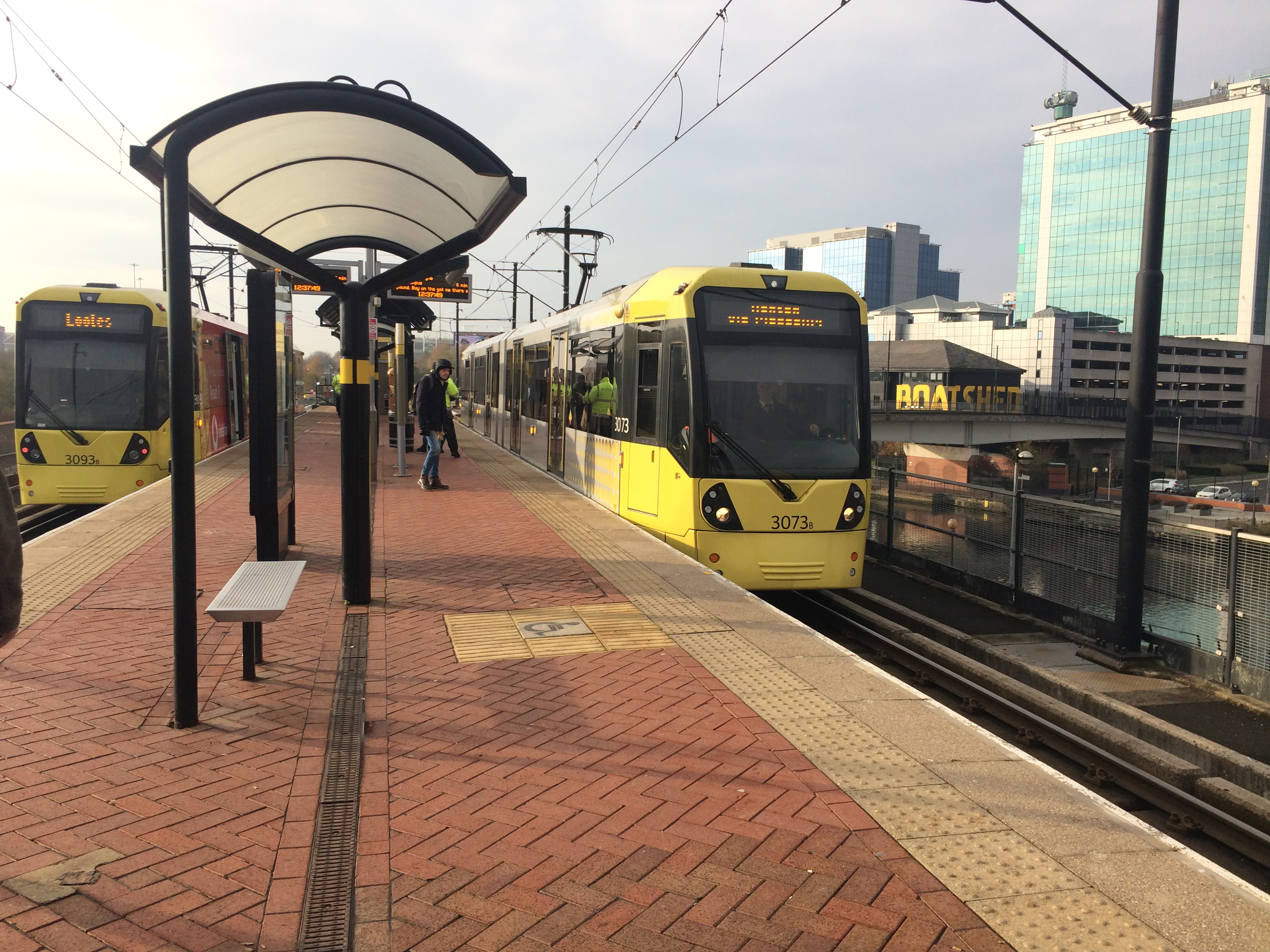
- A tram to Ashton via Piccadilly arrives at Pomona in November 2018.

General information
- Location: Pomona Docks, Trafford; England
- Coordinates: 53.46519°N 2.27807°W
- Grid reference: SJ816965
- System: Manchester Metrolink
- Operator: KeolisAmey
- Transit authority: Transport for Greater Manchester
- Line: Eccles Line
- Platforms: 2 (island)
- Tram routes

Construction
- Structure type: Elevated
- Accessible: Yes

Other information
- Status: In operation
- Station code: POM
- Fare zone: 2
- Website: Pomona tram stop

History
- Opened: 6 December 1999; 26 years ago
Route map
Location

Pomona is a Manchester Metrolink tram stop in Pomona Docks, Trafford. It is on the Eccles Line and in fare zone 2. This stop was opened on 6 December 1999 as part of Phase 2 of the network's expansion and has step-free access.

The stop is located above ground level on a purpose-built viaduct. It has been the least used tram stop for the majority of years that it has been open, but saw a rise in usage after 2020. Pomona tram stop is just south of the Manchester Ship Canal (the border between Trafford and Salford), at the western edge of Pomona Island.

== History ==
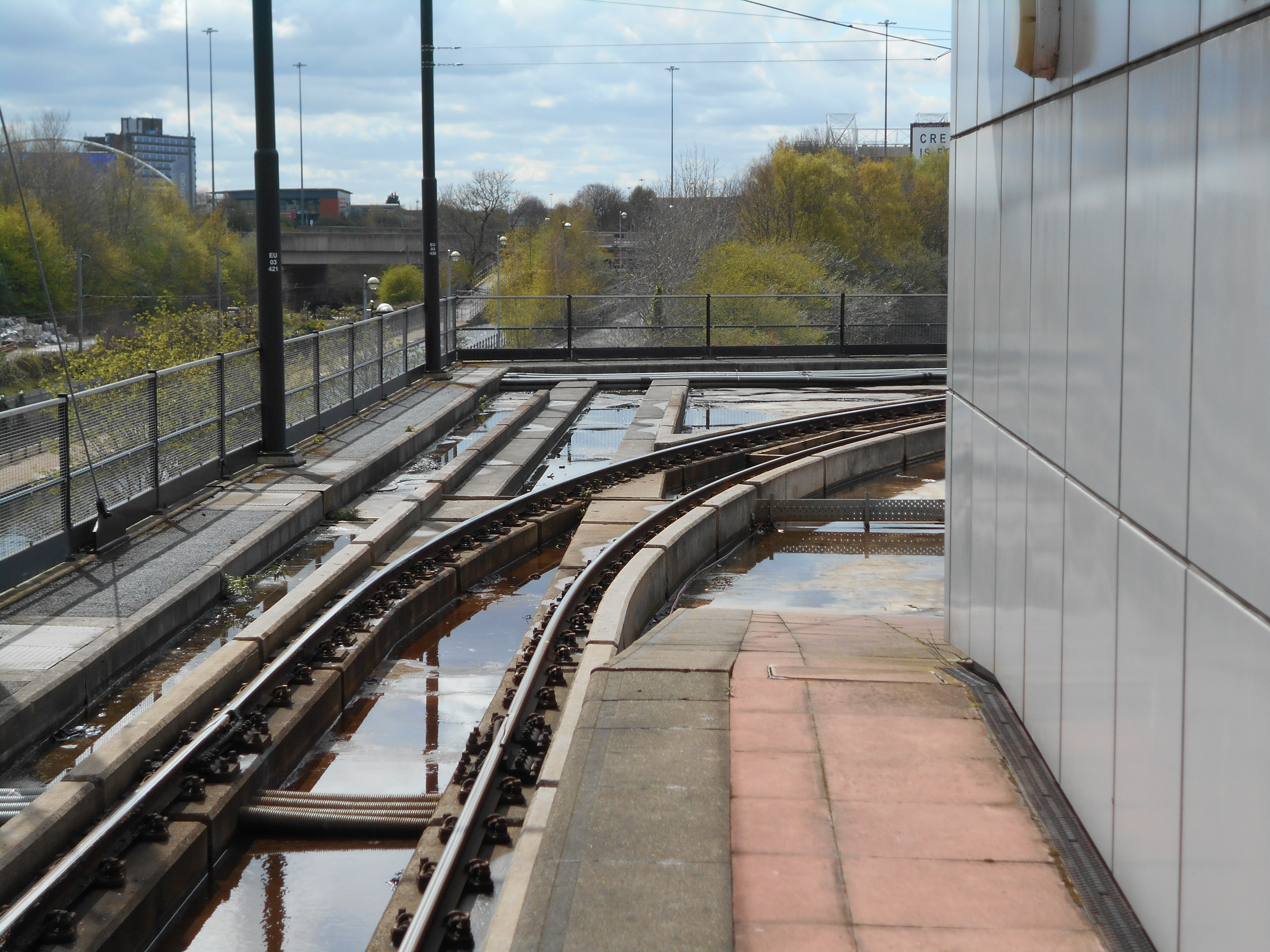
Track blocks at Pomona were in place from 1999 for the provisional Trafford Park Extension.

Construction work on the Eccles Line officially began on 17 July 1997, and the Eccles Line was officially opened as far as Broadway tram stop on 6 December 1999, along with Pomona.

This stop is not near to many landmarks or locations of interest, and as a result has been the least used tram stop across the entire Metrolink network for the majority of years that it has been open. Pomona was designed with an island platform as a potential interchange station in the future between the present Eccles Line and a new Trafford Park Line. In 2016, Metrolink began construction of the Trafford Park Line, which would stem off the existing line west of Pomona station. Supporting concrete blocks for the track had been in place since the station opened in 1999, with the new line opening on 22 March 2020. Because the Trafford Park Line is now open, Pomona's footfall has risen, but also because apartments were built nearby in the late 2010s.

== Layout ==
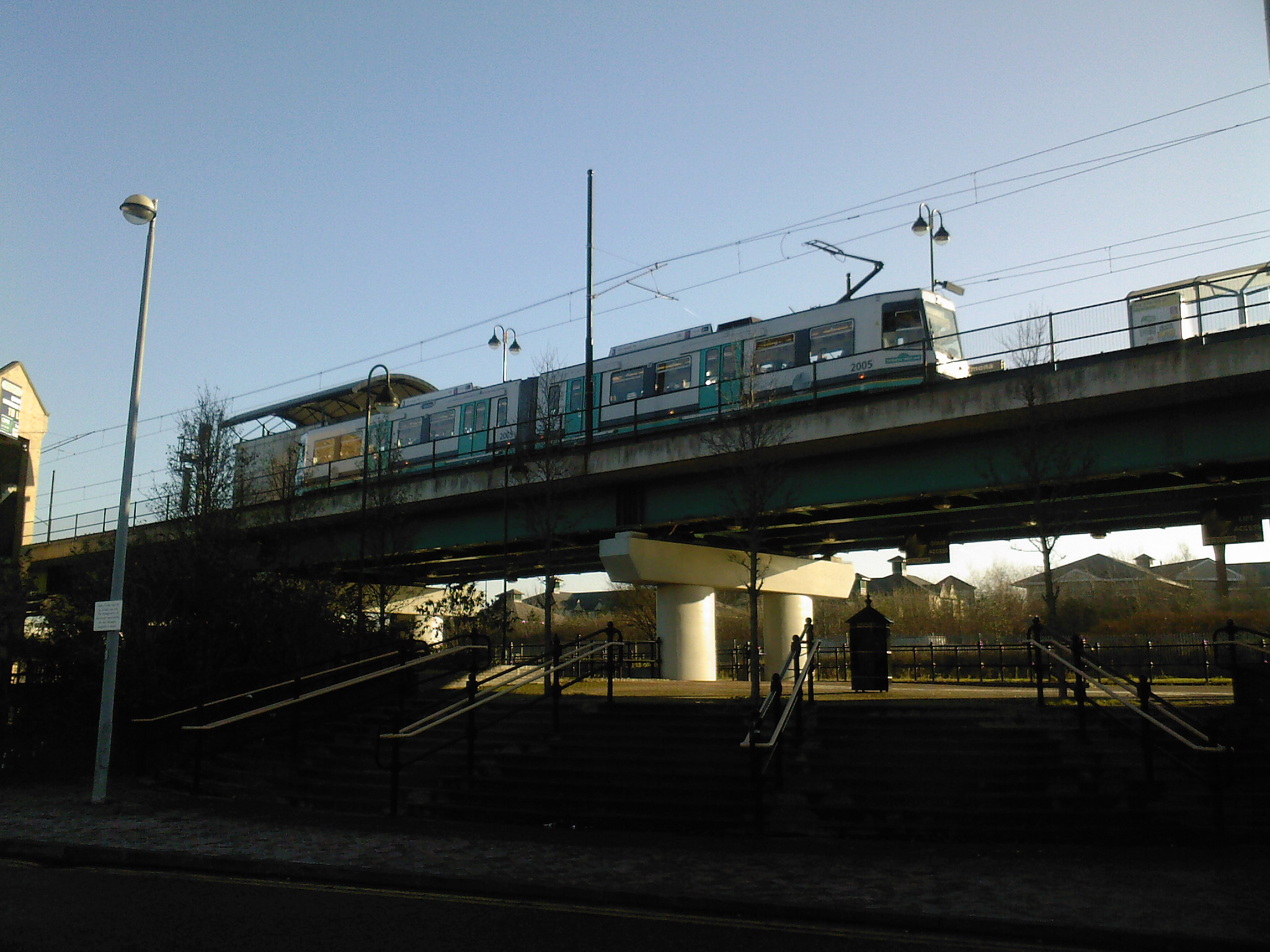
Ground view of Pomona station

=== Tram stop ===
Pomona tram stop was constructed with accessibility in mind, though it is above ground level. A lift was installed at the west side of the tram stop for disabled access, and a set of stairs on the east side. Two dot matrix passenger information displays stand serving one platform each, and show estimated arrival times for trams in minutes up to 30 minutes prior (up to three at a time) and number of carriages.

=== Track layout ===
The junction with the Trafford Park Line lies to the west of the tram stop, with the Eccles Line turning to the north and crossing the Manchester Ship Canal and the Trafford Park Line continuing straight running alongside the ship canal.

== Services ==
Every route across the Manchester Metrolink network operates to a 12-minute headway (5 tph) Monday–Saturday, and to a 15-minute headway (4 tph) on Sundays and bank holidays. Sections served by a second "peak only" route (like this stop) will have a combined headway of 6 minutes during peak times.

Pomona is located in Zone 2 and the stop itself has two platforms (island). Trams towards Manchester heading to Ashton-under-Lyne depart from the inbound platform (northernmost), and trams to Eccles, MediaCityUK, and The Trafford Centre stop at the outbound platform (southernmost).

Preceding station	Manchester Metrolink	Following station
Exchange Quay towards Eccles	Eccles–Ashton (peak only)	Cornbrook towards Ashton-under-Lyne
Exchange Quay towards Eccles	Eccles–Ashton via MediaCityUK (off-peak only)	Cornbrook towards Ashton-under-Lyne
Exchange Quay towards MediaCityUK	MediaCityUK–Etihad Campus (peak only)	Cornbrook towards Etihad Campus
Wharfside towards The Trafford Centre	The Trafford Centre–Deansgate	Cornbrook towards Deansgate-Castlefield

== Transport connections ==
=== Bus ===
This tram stop is not served directly by any bus service, but several services stop on Chester Road.

=== Train ===
This tram stop is not connected to or near to any railway stations, but the nearest is Deansgate, which can be reached by tram, and is about 2 miles (3.2 km) away walking.

== Incidents ==
- 17 January 2007: At 17:14 GMT, a tram from Eccles derails on the approach to Pomona heading towards Piccadilly due to lack of track maintenance.

== See also ==
- Pomona Docks
