= Salford Quays tram stop =

Manchester Metrolink tram stop

Salford Quays
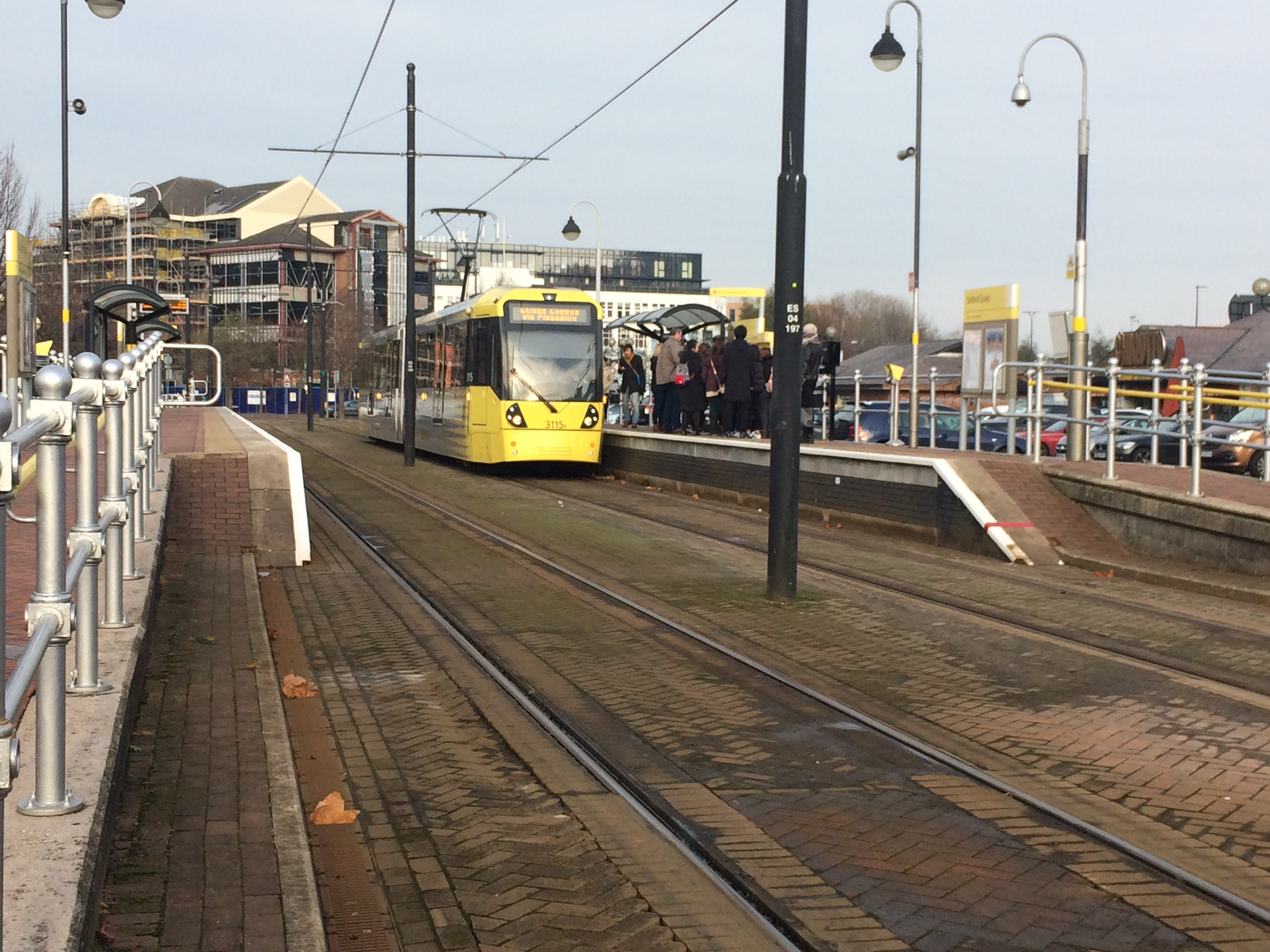
- An M5000 tram at Salford Quays tram stop in November 2018.

General information
- Location: Salford Quays, Salford; England
- Coordinates: 53.47031°N 2.28399°W
- Grid reference: SJ812971
- System: Metrolink station
- Line: Eccles Line
- Platforms: 2

Other information
- Status: In operation
- Fare zone: 2

History
- Opened: 6 December 1999
- Original company: Metrolink
Route map
Location

Salford Quays tram stop is a stop on Greater Manchester's light rail Metrolink system. It is located beside Salford Quays, on Metrolink's Eccles Line. It opened as part of Phase 2 of the system's expansion, on 6 December 1999.

== Services ==
Preceding station	Manchester Metrolink	Following station
Anchorage towards Eccles	Eccles–Ashton (peak only)	Exchange Quay towards Ashton-under-Lyne
Anchorage towards Eccles	Eccles–Ashton via MediaCityUK (off-peak only)	Exchange Quay towards Ashton-under-Lyne
Anchorage towards MediaCityUK	MediaCityUK–Etihad Campus (peak only)	Exchange Quay towards Etihad Campus

== Connecting bus routes ==
Salford Quays station is served by buses stopping nearby on Trafford Road. Services that stop nearby are Go North West Orbits 53, which runs to Pendleton and to Cheetham Hill via Rusholme, Gorton and Harpurhey and Diamond Bus North West service 79, which runs between Salford Shopping Centre and Stretford.
