= Pomona Island, Manchester =

Island in Manchester

Coordinates: 53°28′10″N 02°16′15″W

Pomona Island
- Location within the United Kingdom
- Unitary authority: Manchester, Trafford
- Country: England
- Sovereign state: United Kingdom

Pomona Island is an island in Greater Manchester, England, located between the Manchester Ship Canal and the Bridgewater Canal.

It is served by the Cornbrook tram stop and Pomona tram stop on the Manchester Metrolink.

== History ==
In 1845, William and Joseph Beardsley Cornbrook opened Strawberry Gardens on the island; they were later renamed to Pomona Gardens after the Roman goddess Pomona. The gardens gave their name to a public house at Cornbrook.

In 1868, the gardens were bought by James Reilly, who built the Royal Pomona Palace on the site— the biggest concert hall in the UK at the time, seating over 20,000 people. It was opened in 1875, and closed in 1887 following an explosion at a nearby chemicals factory.

The Pomona docks were then built on the site, and operated until the 1970s. After the closure of the docks, a nightclub named North Westward Ho briefly operated on a boat on the site, but closed in 1981.

The island then lay abandoned for decades until redevelopment as part of the Manchester Waters project began in the 2020s.
