= Cornbrook tram stop =

Manchester Metrolink tram stop

Cornbrook
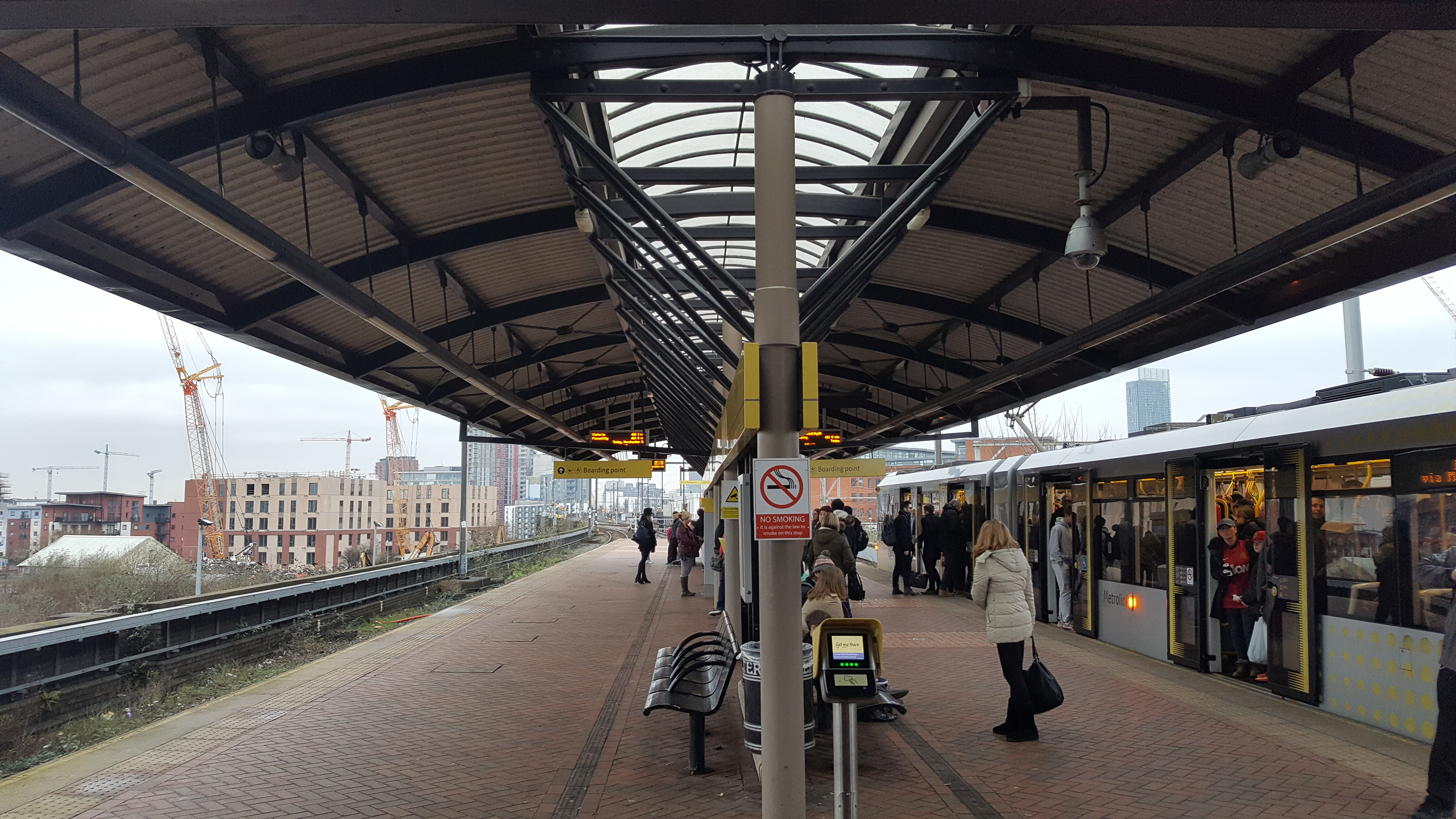

General information
- Location: Cornbrook, Manchester; England
- Coordinates: 53.4700°N 2.2675°W
- Grid reference: SJ823971
- System: Metrolink station
- Line: Altrincham Line
- Platforms: 2 (island)

Other information
- Status: In operation
- Fare zone: 1/2

History
- Original company: Manchester Metrolink

Key dates
- 6 December 1999: Opened (for interchange only)
- 3 September 2005: Opened (for entry and exit)
Route map
Location

Cornbrook tram stop is a tram stop on Greater Manchester's light rail Metrolink system in the Cornbrook area of Manchester, England. It is an interchange station, allowing passenger transfer between the network's Altrincham, Eccles, Airport, Trafford Park and South Manchester lines. The station opened on 6 December 1999 for interchange (line transfers) only, and allowed street-level entry and exit to the public from 3 September 2005. It takes its name from Cornbrook Road, between the A56 and Pomona Docks on the Manchester Ship Canal, and was built on what was a Cheshire Lines Committee route to Manchester Central railway station. The stop is one of the most used on the Metrolink network.

== History ==
The stop is named after the now culverted Corn Brook, a tributary of the River Irwell which runs through the area.

The stop opened with the Eccles extension on 6 December 1999 with two through platforms and a Manchester facing bay platform for terminating trams. Cornbrook was unique when opened as there was no access to/from the street, the stop being used for transfer between Bury-Altrincham line trams and Eccles Line trams. This was due to security issues and a low estimated usage.

Because of a rise in the local population due to new residential developments, particularly on Ellesmere Street, the stop's emergency exit staircase to the street was converted into a full passenger entrance/exit, which opened on 3 September 2005. There are plans to relocate the entrance as part of the "Cornbrook Hub" redevelopment.

During August 2009, the track layout was extensively remodelled to accommodate the MediaCityUK tram service and as a result the track was removed from the bay platform, reducing the number of platforms to two. However the infrastructure remains and the platform could be reinstated if the need arises.

This is the second station in this locality as Cornbrook railway station was opened to serve Pomona Gardens on the south side of Cornbrook Road on 1 June 1856 by the Manchester, South Junction and Altrincham Railway (MSJAR), which runs parallel to the Metrolink at this point. The first station closed on 31 May 1865.

== Services ==
Services run every 12 minutes on all routes. Some routes (as indicated) only operate during peak times.

| Preceding station | Manchester Metrolink | Following station |
|---|---|---|
| Trafford Bar towards East Didsbury | East Didsbury–Shaw (peak only) | Deansgate-Castlefield towards Shaw and Crompton |
| Trafford Bar towards East Didsbury | East Didsbury–Rochdale | Deansgate-Castlefield towards Rochdale Town Centre |
| Trafford Bar towards Manchester Airport | Manchester Airport–Victoria | Deansgate-Castlefield towards Victoria |
| Trafford Bar towards Altrincham | Altrincham–Bury (peak only) | Deansgate-Castlefield towards Bury |
| Trafford Bar towards Altrincham | Altrincham–Piccadilly | Deansgate-Castlefield towards Piccadilly |
| Trafford Bar towards Altrincham | Altrincham–Etihad Campus (evenings and Sundays only) | Deansgate-Castlefield towards Etihad Campus |
| Pomona towards Eccles | Eccles–Ashton (peak only) | Deansgate-Castlefield towards Ashton-under-Lyne |
| Pomona towards Eccles | Eccles–Ashton via MediaCityUK (off-peak only) | Deansgate-Castlefield towards Ashton-under-Lyne |
| Pomona towards MediaCityUK | MediaCityUK–Etihad Campus (peak only) | Deansgate-Castlefield towards Etihad Campus |
| Pomona towards The Trafford Centre | The Trafford Centre–Deansgate | Deansgate-Castlefield Terminus |

== Connecting bus routes ==
Cornbrook station is served by bus services on nearby Chester Road. Stagecoach Manchester service 255 runs to Partington via Stretford and Urmston. Services run to Manchester, terminating at Piccadilly Gardens.

== Gallery ==
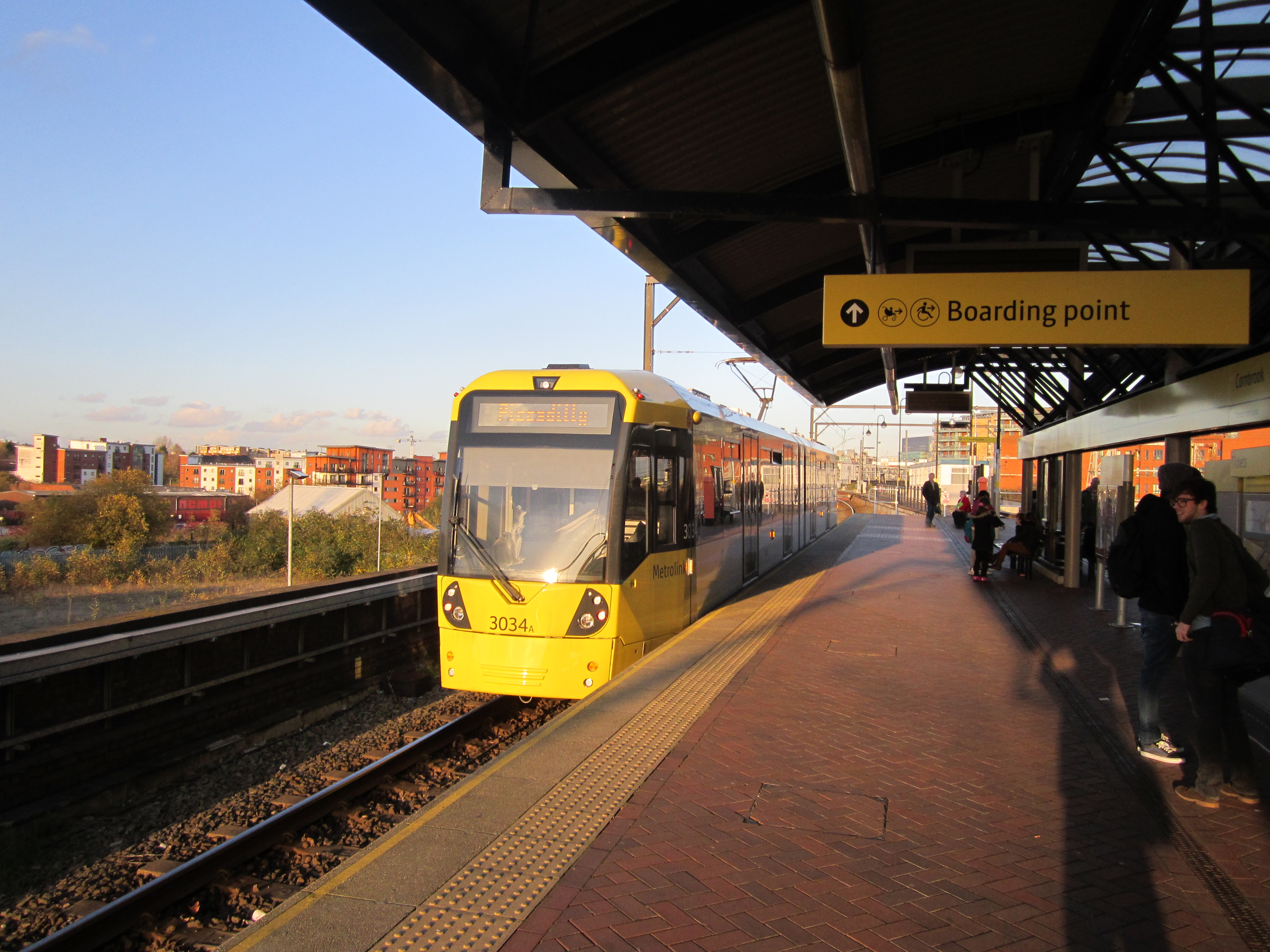
A Bombardier M5000 at Cornbrook tram stop in 2012

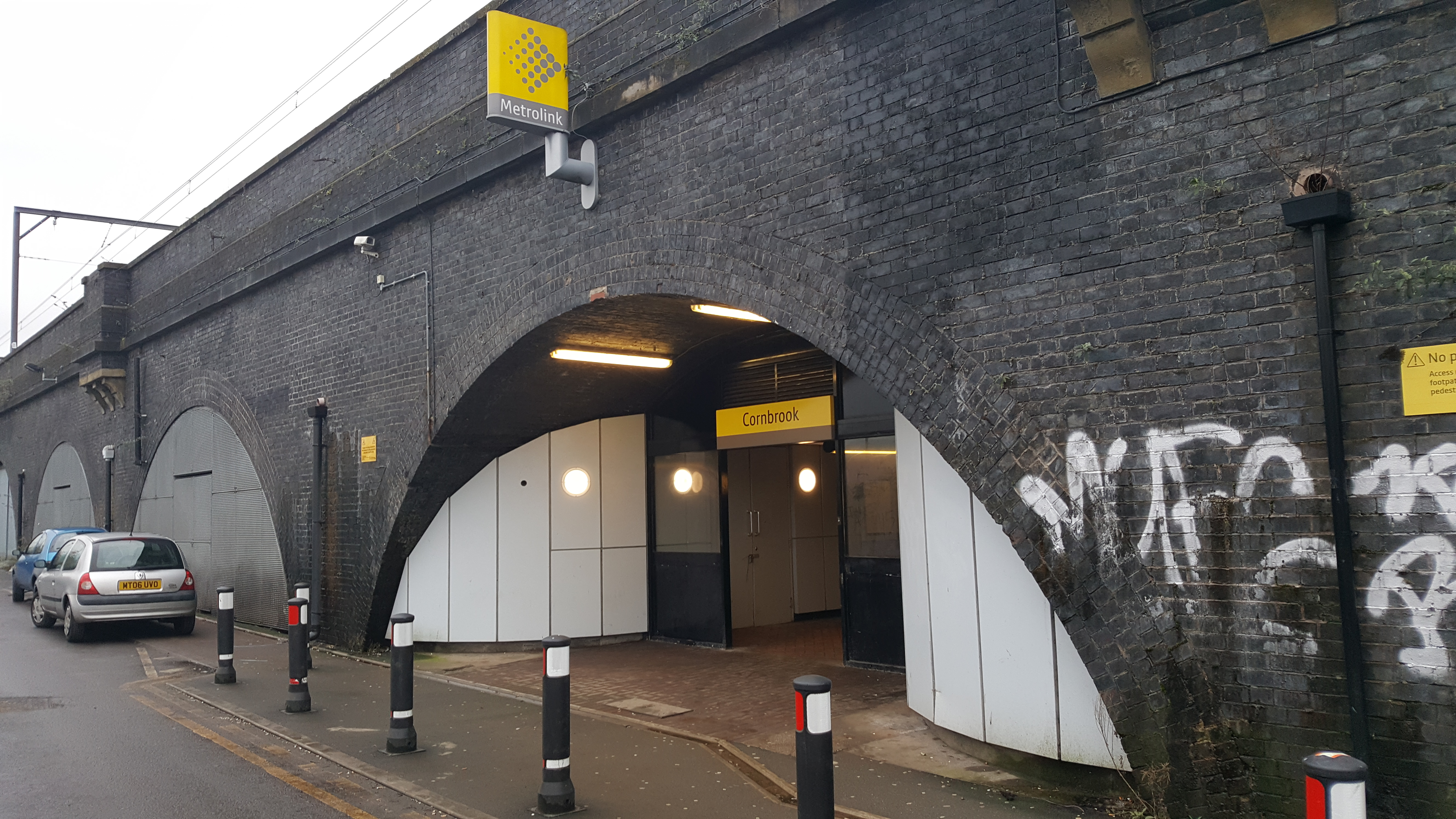
The entrance to Cornbrook station on Cornbrook Road

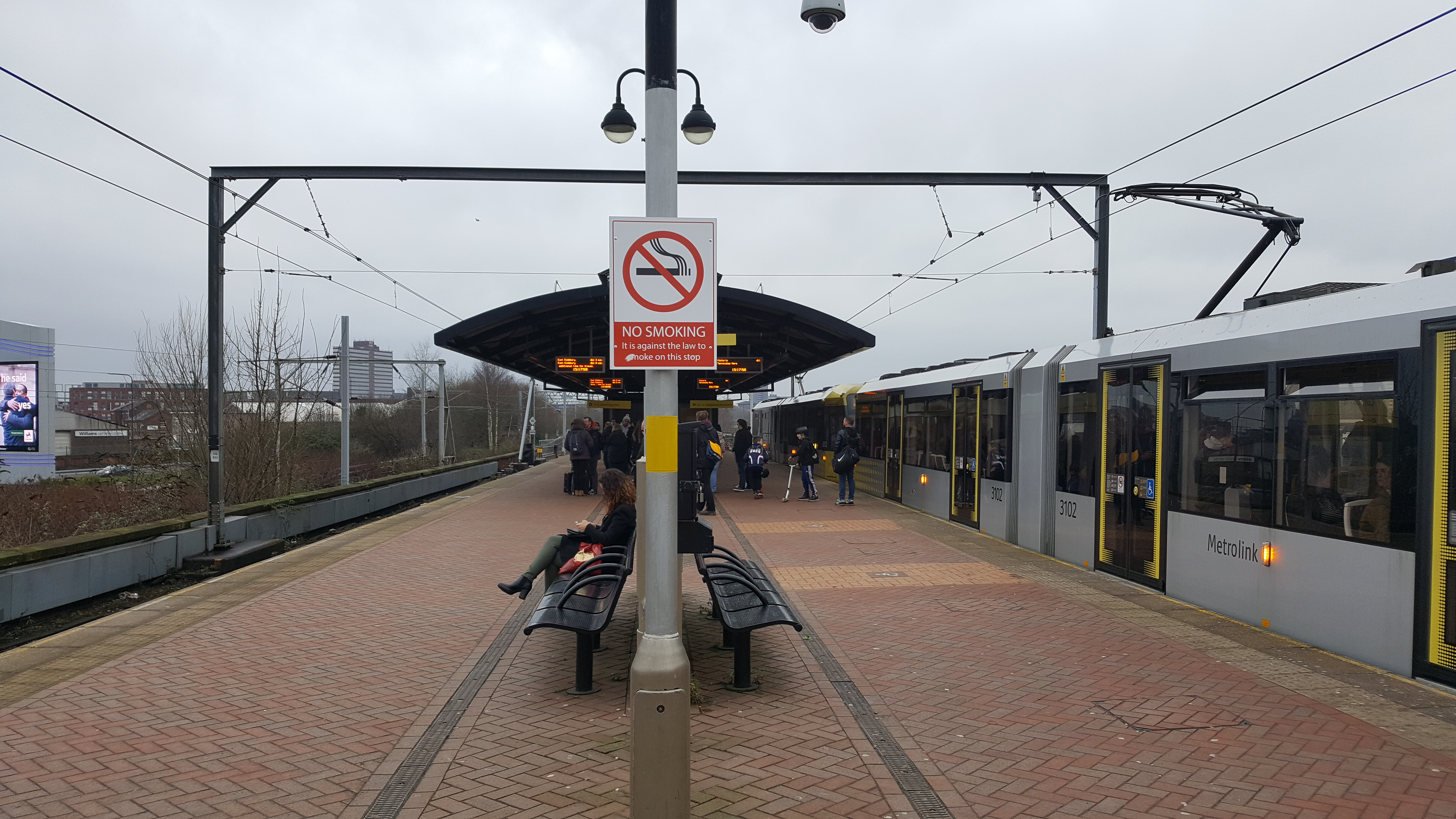
Cornbrook tram stop in January 2017
