= Exchange Quay tram stop =

Manchester Metrolink tram stop

Exchange Quay
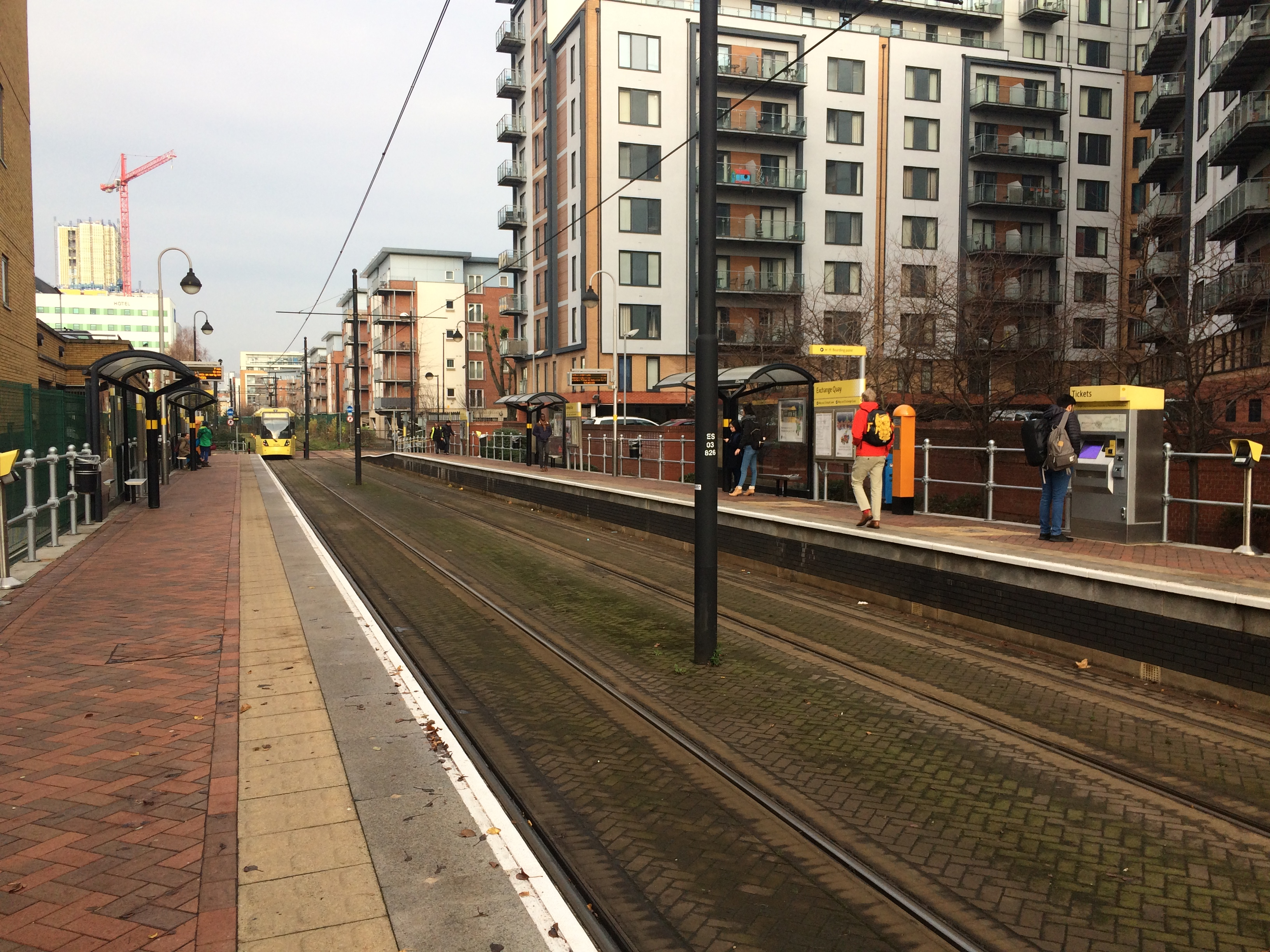
- Exchange Quay tram stop in November 2018.

General information
- Location: Salford Quays, Salford; England
- Coordinates: 53.46770°N 2.28233°W
- Grid reference: SJ813968
- System: Metrolink station
- Line: Eccles Line
- Platforms: 2

Other information
- Status: In operation
- Fare zone: 2

History
- Opened: 6 December 1999
- Original company: Metrolink
Route map
Location

Exchange Quay is a tram stop on the Eccles Line of Greater Manchester's light rail Metrolink system. It is located in the Salford Quays area, in North West England, and opened on 6 December 1999 as part of Phase 2 of the system's expansion. The stop serves the Exchange Quay office complex and the surrounding area. It is also often used as a stop for Old Trafford football stadium.

== Exchange Quay ==
The station serves the Exchange Quay office complex in Salford Quays and the surrounding area. The complex, owned by Hunter Property Fund Management, consists of six office buildings, a gym, several car parks, and a retail area. Due to the station's close proximity to Old Trafford football stadium, it is frequently used on match-days by fans travelling on the Eccles and MediaCityUK services.

== Services ==
| Preceding station | Manchester Metrolink | Following station |
|---|---|---|
| Salford Quays towards Eccles | Eccles–Ashton (peak only) | Pomona towards Ashton-under-Lyne |
| Salford Quays towards Eccles | Eccles–Ashton via MediaCityUK (off-peak only) | Pomona towards Ashton-under-Lyne |
| Salford Quays towards MediaCityUK | MediaCityUK–Etihad Campus (peak only) | Pomona towards Etihad Campus |

== Connecting bus routes ==
Exchange Quay station is served by bus stops on the nearby Trafford Road: Diamond Bus North West service 79, and Go North West Orbits 53, which runs to Pendleton and to Cheetham Hill via Rusholme, Gorton and Harpurhey, operate from these stops.
