= Anchorage tram stop =

Manchester Metrolink tram stop

Anchorage
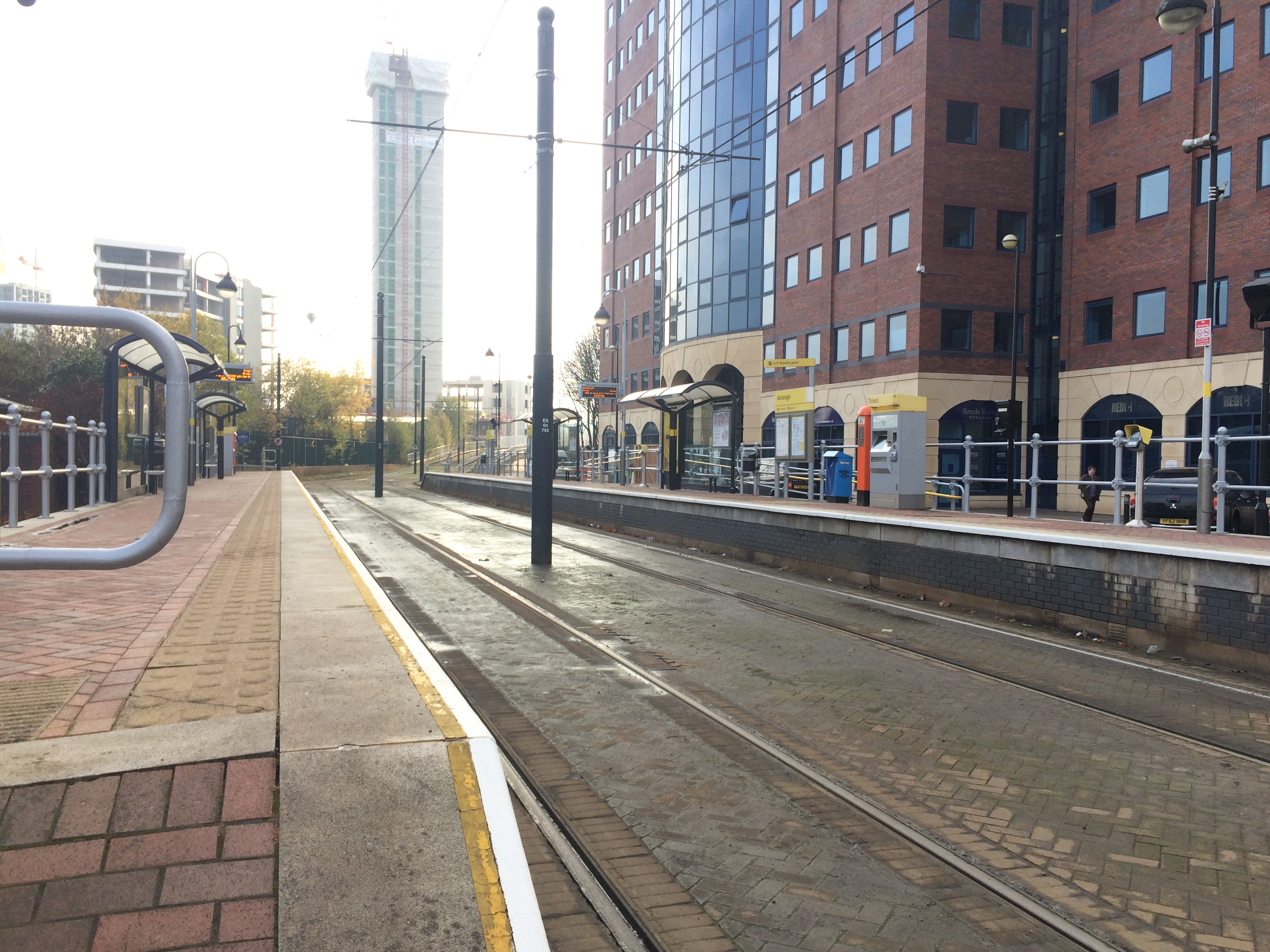
- Anchorage tram stop looking towards the Anchorage building in November 2018.

General information
- Location: Salford Quays, Salford; England
- Coordinates: 53.47433°N 2.28601°W
- Grid reference: SJ811975
- System: Metrolink station
- Line: Eccles Line
- Platforms: 2

Other information
- Status: In operation
- Fare zone: 2

History
- Opened: 6 December 1999
- Original company: Metrolink
Route map
Location

Anchorage tram stop is on the Eccles Line of Greater Manchester's light rail Metrolink system, in the Salford Quays area, in North West England. It opened on 6 December 1999 as part of Phase 2 of the system's expansion, next to The Anchorage skyscraper that was constructed in 1991, and near the terminus of Salford's old Dock 9.

== Services ==
Preceding station	Manchester Metrolink	Following station
Harbour City towards Eccles	Eccles–Ashton (peak only)	Salford Quays towards Ashton-under-Lyne
Harbour City towards Eccles	Eccles–Ashton via MediaCityUK (off-peak only)	Salford Quays towards Ashton-under-Lyne
Harbour City towards MediaCityUK	MediaCityUK–Etihad Campus (peak only)	Salford Quays towards Etihad Campus

== Connecting bus routes ==
Anchorage tram stop is served by Diamond Bus North West services 29, 73 & 79, Go North West Orbits 53, travelling between Cheetham Hill & Salford Shopping Centre and Stagecoach Manchester service 50, linking Salford Shopping Centre in Pendleton, Salford Crescent railway station, Salford University, Salford Central railway station, Manchester and East Didsbury with Salford Quays and MediaCityUK.
