= Eccles Line =

Manchester Metrolink line

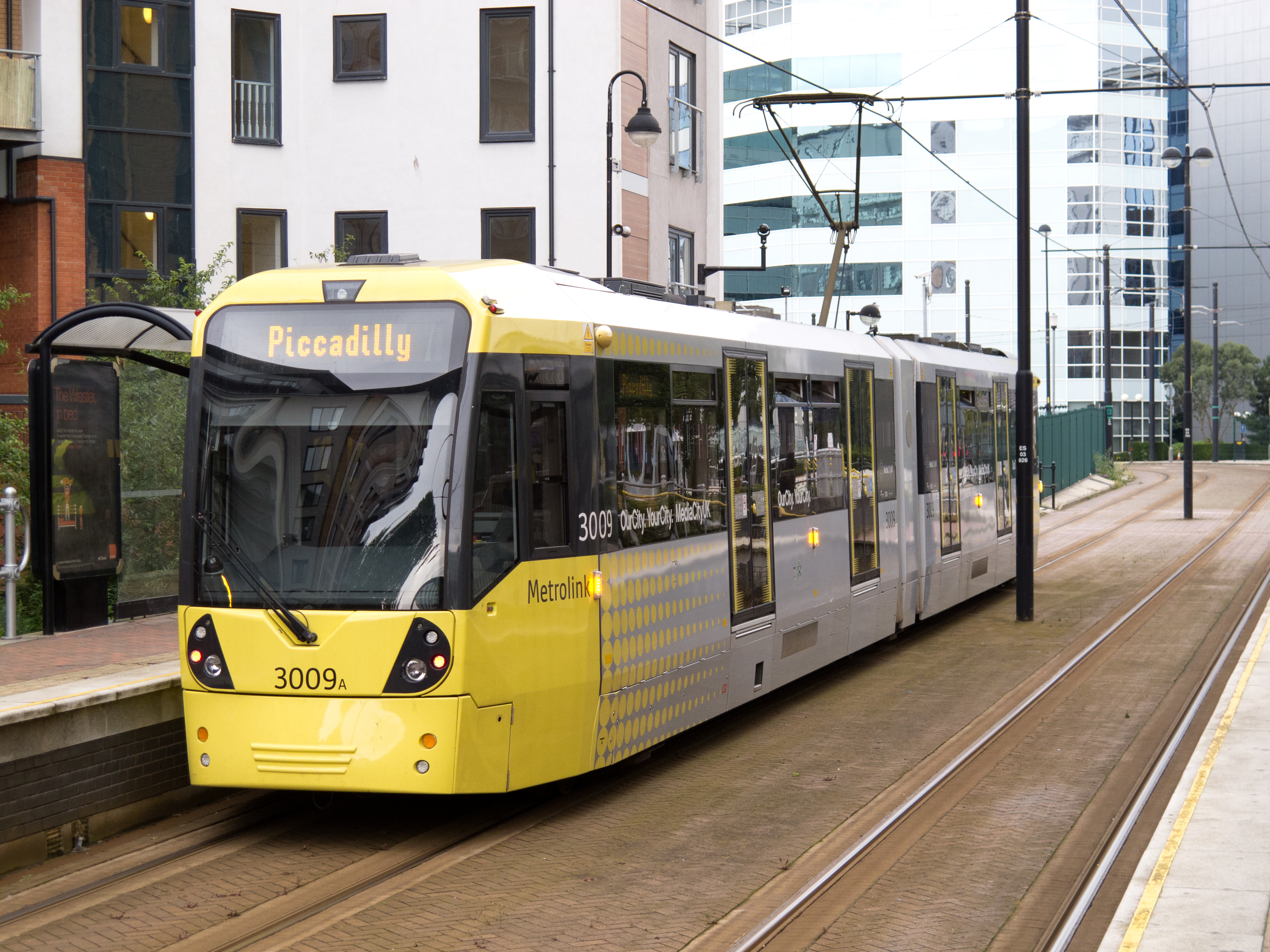
- An M5000 tram at Exchange Quay tram stop, 2011

Overview
- Locale: Manchester; Eccles
- Termini: Cornbrook; MediaCityUK, Eccles Interchange
- Stations: 11

Service
- Type: Tram/Light rail
- System: Manchester Metrolink
- Rolling stock: Bombardier M5000 (2009-Present); AnsaldoBreda T-68/T68A (1999-2014)

History
- Opened: 6 December 1999 (Cornbrook to Broadway); 21 July 2000 (Broadway to Eccles); 20 September 2010 (spur to MediaCityUK)

Technical
- Line length: 4 miles (6.4 km)
- Character: Reserved track and street running
- Track gauge: 4 ft 8 1/2 in (1,435 mm) standard gauge
- Electrification: 750 volts DC overhead
- Operating speed: 35 mph (55km/h)

The Eccles Line is a tram line of the Manchester Metrolink in Greater Manchester running from Manchester to Eccles via Salford Quays, with a short spur to MediaCityUK. It was opened in phases during 1999–2000 as part of the second phase of the system's development. The spur to MediaCityUK was opened in 2010. The line contains a mixture of reserved track beds and a street running section.

== Route ==
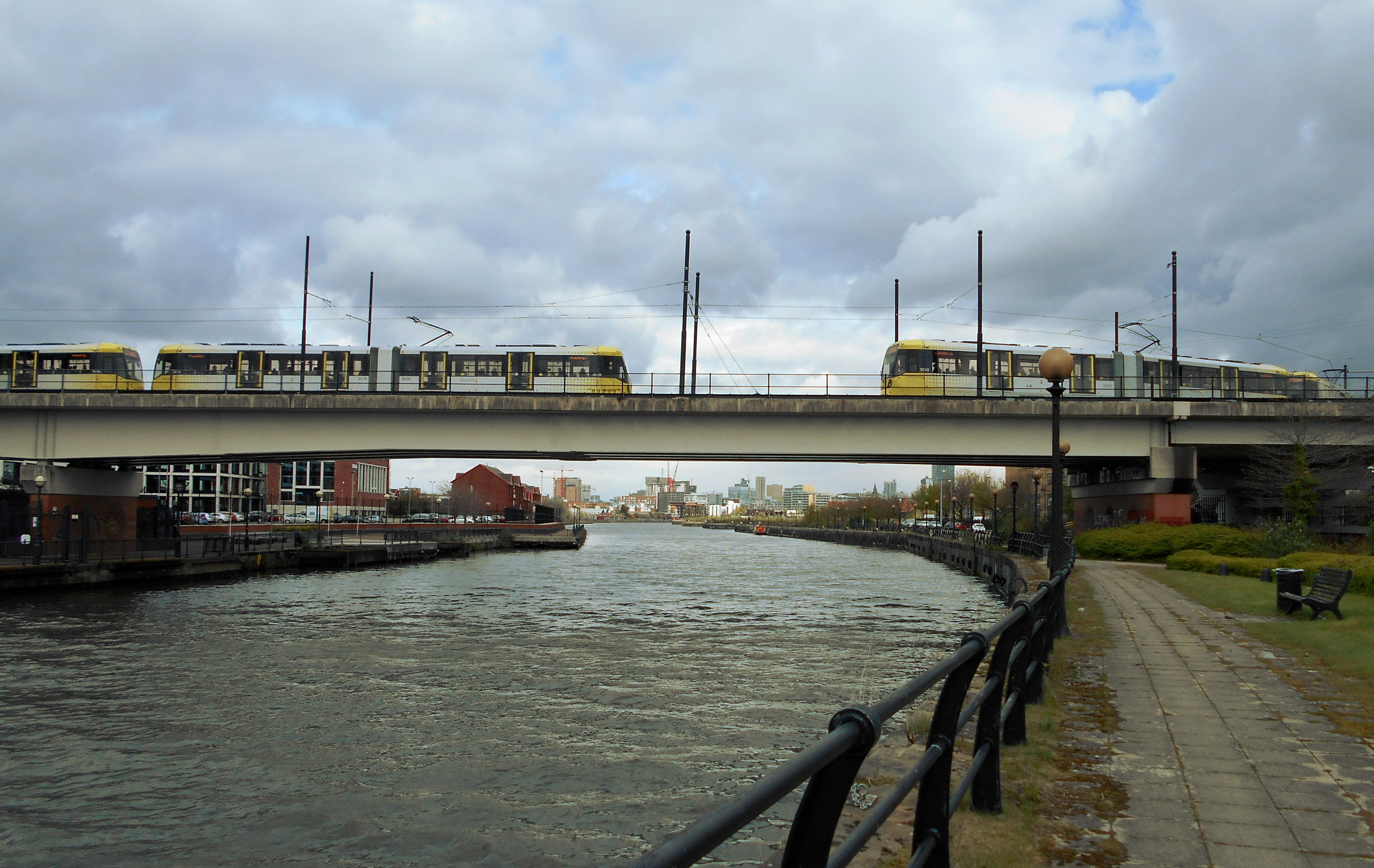
Two trams crossing the Manchester Ship Canal on Pomona Viaduct

The line physically starts at a junction with the Altrincham Line, just west of Cornbrook tram stop, which itself was opened with the line, initially as an interchange between the Eccles and Altrincham lines. It then runs over the 650-metre-long Pomona Viaduct, which carries the line over the Bridgewater Canal: Pomona tram stop is located upon this viaduct south of the ship canal, and is the interchange with the Trafford Park Line which opened in March 2020.

The line then takes a sharp right turn to pass over the Manchester Ship Canal to enter the Salford Quays area, and plunges down to street-level to get to Exchange Quay tram stop. It takes another sharp turn and crosses Trafford Road to get to Salford Quays, then runs alongside and crosses over The Quays (road) and travels on a short bridge (Furness Quay Ramp) to get to Anchorage. After crossing another road and travelling on a short off-street section, it gets to Harbour City. There is a short spur after this tram stop to MediaCityUK. After the next stop, Broadway, the line begins running on the street at South Langworthy Road, then takes a sharp left turn to get onto Eccles New Road and Langworthy tram stop. It runs all the way to Eccles town centre along Eccles New Road, serving Weaste and Ladywell, temporarily pulling to the side of the road to serve tram stops instead of disrupting traffic, much like the East Manchester Line, another line on the Metrolink network. After Ladywell, the line ducks into a tunnel underneath Ladywell Roundabout, and reappears at street-level again just before Eccles tram stop, and at the same time, the track singles: Eccles is served by a single-platform tram stop.

=== Route map ===
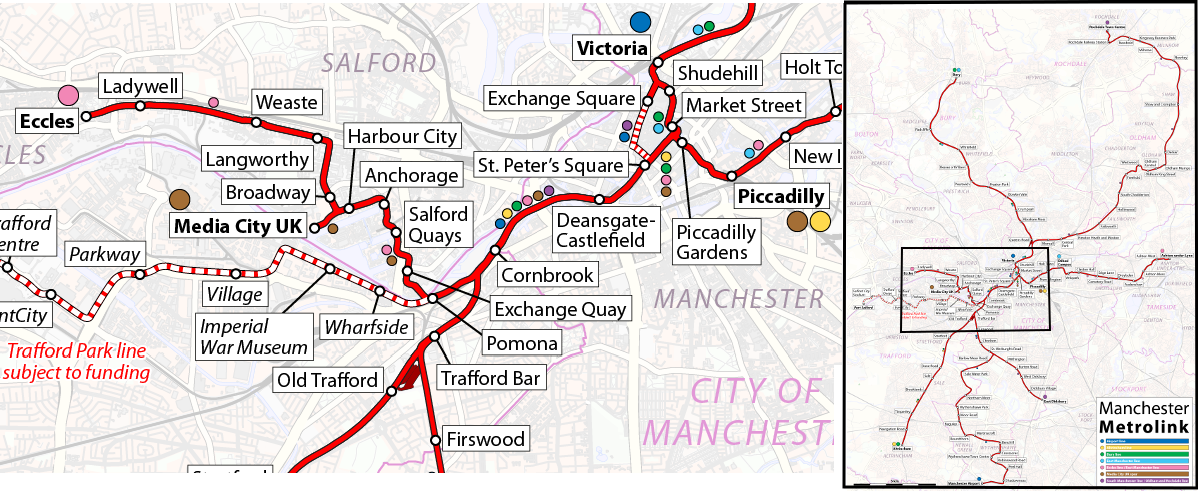
Map of the line

== History ==
During the 1990s, Salford Quays became a business district specifically redeveloped for commerce, leisure, culture and tourism with a high density of business units and modern housing, complemented by a cinema complex, office blocks, and waterfront promenade. As it had poor public transport integration and no rail provision, it was earmarked for a potential Metrolink line as early as 1986 and legal authority to construct the line through the Quays was acquired in 1990. The Quays received millions of pounds of investment and a public consultation and public inquiry resulted in government endorsement in 1994. In autumn 1995 a 4-mile (6.4 km) Metrolink line branching from Cornbrook tram stop to Eccles via Salford Quays capitalising on the regenerated Quayside was confirmed as Phase 2 of Metrolink. No funding came from central government and money was raised from the Greater Manchester Passenger Transport Authority (GMPTA), the European Regional Development Fund and private developers. In April 1997 Altram, a consortium of the Serco, Ansaldo and John Laing, was appointed to construct the Eccles Line; Serco, responsible for the Sheffield Supertram would operate the whole network under contract; Ansaldo provided six additional vehicles — T-68As – and signalling equipment. Construction work officially began on 17 July 1997.

The Eccles Line was officially opened as far as Broadway tram stop on 6 December 1999 by the Prime Minister, Tony Blair, who praised Metrolink as "exactly the type of scheme needed to solve the transport problems of the metropolitan areas of the country"; a service to Eccles Interchange joined the network on 21 July 2000, and was officially declared open by Anne, Princess Royal at a ceremony on 9 January 2001.

The specially-constructed 360-metre (0.22 mi) long spur to MediaCityUK tram stop was opened on 20 September 2010, to serve the MediaCityUK development. The Eccles Line underwent essential track renewal over a two-month period in 2016.

== Services ==
As of 2024, there are two services running on the Eccles Line:

- A 12-minute interval service from MediaCityUK to Etihad Campus, running during Monday to Saturday daytimes only.
- A 12-minute interval service from Eccles to Ashton-under-Lyne running all hours, during evenings and Sundays this service runs via MediaCityUK.

=== Rolling stock ===
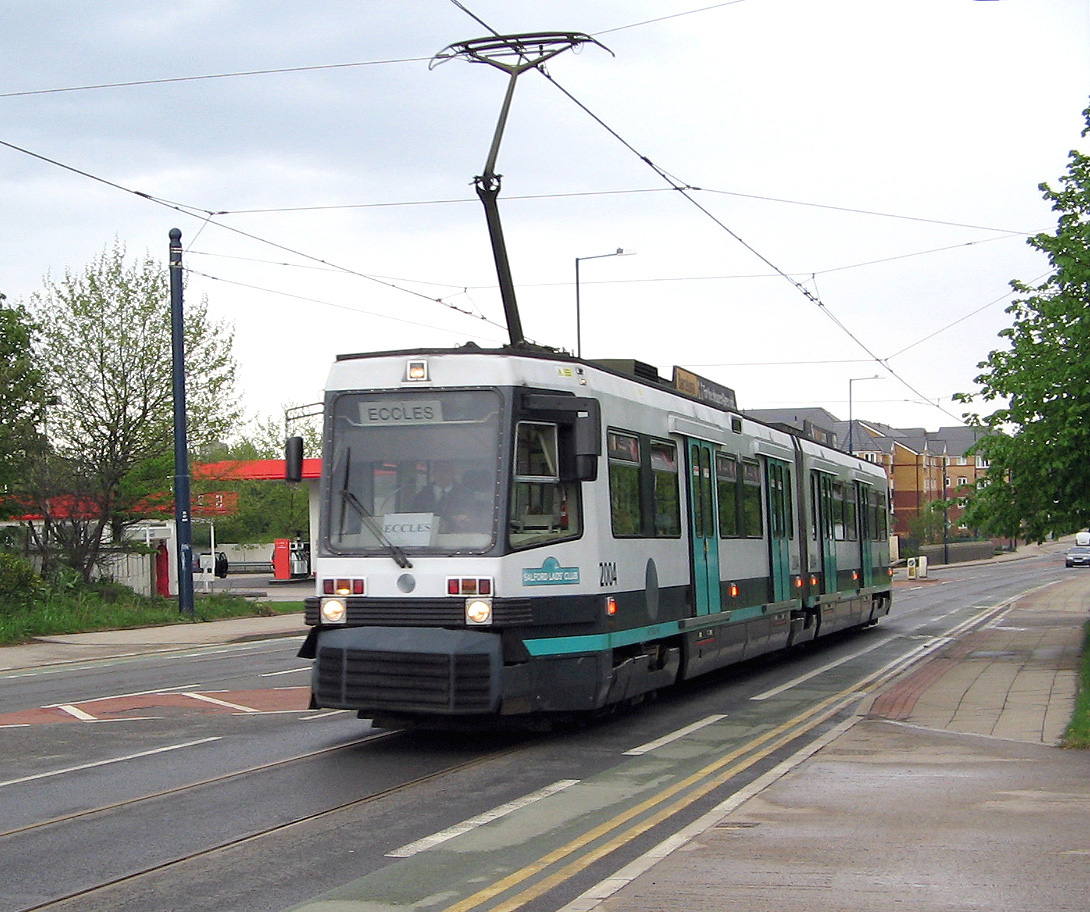
One of the original T-68A trams, now retired, street running along Eccles New Road in 2005

To commence operations in 1999, six T-68A trams were ordered to operate the line. These were variants of the original T-68 trams which had operated the original system from 1992, which had modifications to allow them to operate on the street running section of the Eccles line with other motor traffic. All of the T-68 fleet was eventually modified to allow them to operate on the Eccles line.

From 2009 the new fleet of M5000 trams were introduced, and these replaced the T-68/A trams during 2012–14.

== Bibliography ==
- GMPTE (2000). Metrolink, Transforming Our Future: A Network for the 21st Century. Manchester: GMPTE Promotions.
- GMPTE (2003). Metrolink: A Network for the 21st Century (PDF). Manchester: GMPTE Promotions.
