= Harbour City tram stop =

Tram stop on the Eccles Line of Greater Manchester's light rail system

Harbour City
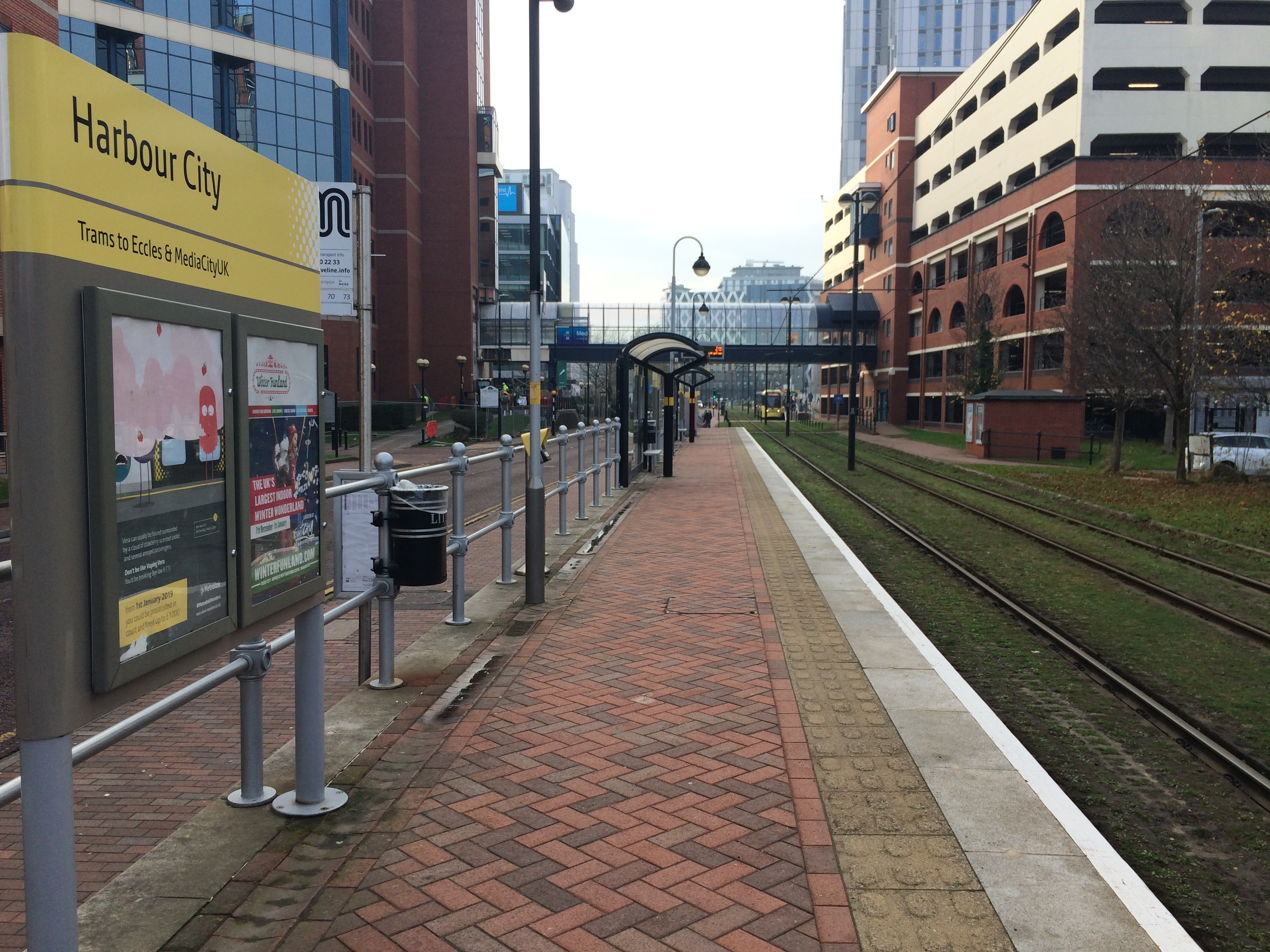
- Harbour City Eccles-bound platform in November 2018, with the Manchester bound platform in the distance.

General information
- Location: Salford Quays, City of Salford; England
- Coordinates: 53.47416°N 2.29074°W
- Grid reference: SJ807975
- System: Metrolink station
- Line: Eccles Line
- Platforms: 2

Other information
- Status: In operation
- Fare zone: 2

History
- Opened: 6 December 1999
- Original company: Metrolink
Route map
Location

Harbour City is a tram stop on the Eccles Line of Greater Manchester's light rail Metrolink system. It is located in the Salford Quays area, in North West England, and opened on 6 December 1999 as part of Phase 2 of the system's expansion. The two platforms of this tram stop are staggered. The outbound platform is about 50 metres away from the inbound platform.

== Services ==
Preceding station	Manchester Metrolink	Following station
Broadway towards Eccles	Eccles–Ashton (peak only)	Anchorage towards Ashton-under-Lyne
MediaCityUK towards Eccles	Eccles–Ashton via MediaCityUK (off-peak only)	Anchorage towards Ashton-under-Lyne
MediaCityUK Terminus	MediaCityUK–Etihad Campus (peak only)	Anchorage towards Etihad Campus

== Connecting bus routes ==
Harbour City tram stop is served by Diamond Bus North West services 29, 73 & 79, Go North West Orbits 53, travelling between Cheetham Hill & Salford Shopping Centre and Stagecoach Manchester service 50, linking Salford Shopping Centre in Pendleton, Salford Crescent railway station, Salford University, Salford Central railway station, Manchester and East Didsbury with Salford Quays and MediaCityUK.
