= Broadway tram stop =

Manchester Metrolink tram stop

Broadway
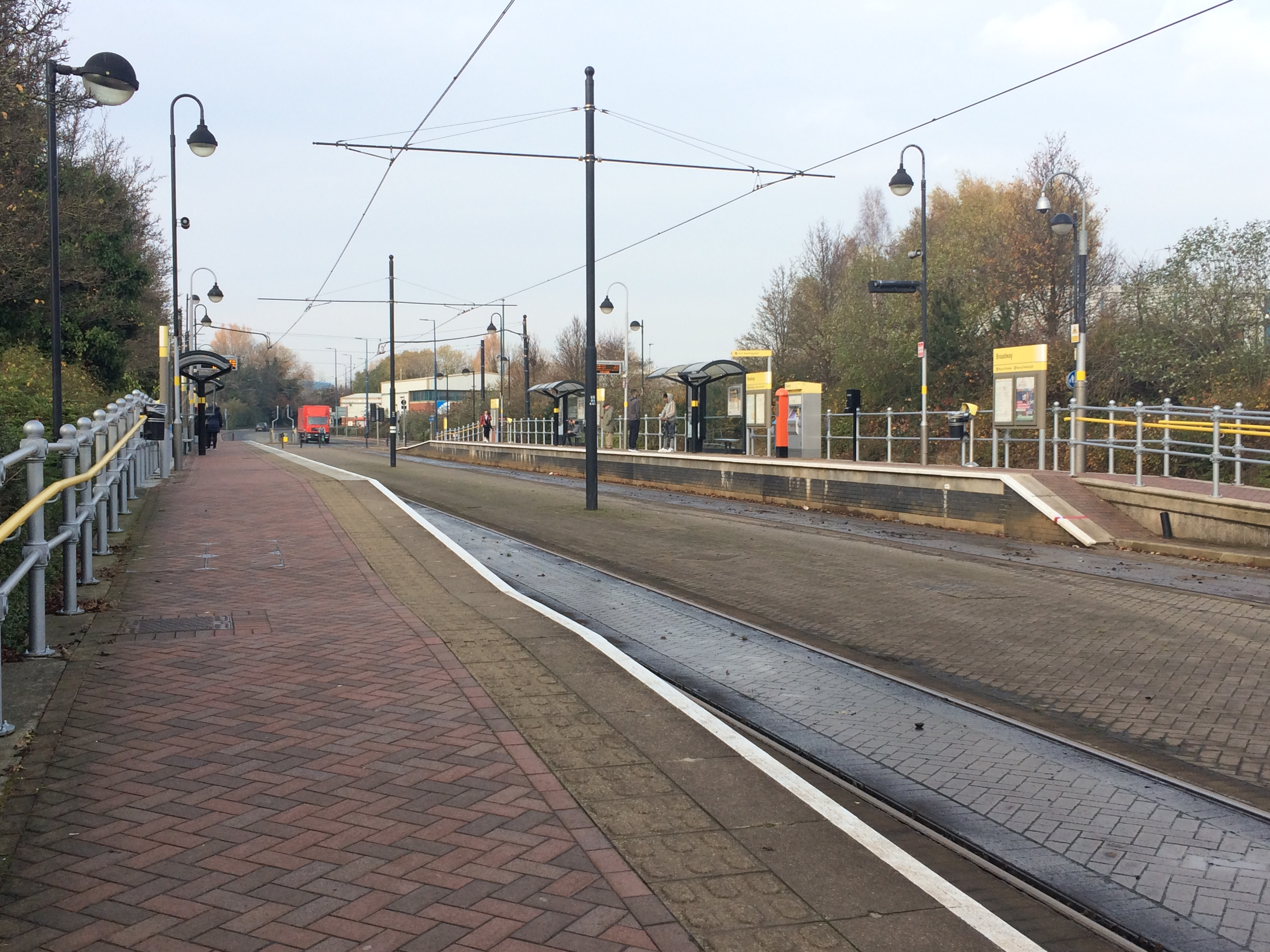
- Broadway tram stop facing north in November 2018. Taken from outbound (Eccles-bound) platform.

General information
- Location: Salford Quays, Salford; England
- Coordinates: 53.47481°N 2.29494°W
- Grid reference: SJ805975
- System: Manchester Metrolink
- Operator: KeolisAmey
- Transit authority: Transport for Greater Manchester
- Line: Eccles Line
- Platforms: 2
- Tram routes

Construction
- Structure type: At-grade
- Accessible: Yes

Other information
- Status: In operation
- Station code: BDW
- Fare zone: 2
- Website: Broadway tram stop

History
- Opened: 6 December 1999; 26 years ago
Route map
Location

Broadway is a Manchester Metrolink tram stop in Salford Quays, Salford, close to the border with Weaste, a nearby suburb. It is on the Eccles Line and in fare zone 2. This stop was opened on 6 December 1999 as part of Phase 2 of the network's expansion and has step-free access.

The stop is located at ground (street) level. It is one of the lesser used stops on the Metrolink network, being the least used tram stop in 2023/24. Immediately north of Broadway tram stop is a three-way T-junction with Broadway (road) which runs perpendicular to the tram stop's platforms and is the stop's namesake, and South Langworthy Road, which continues north from Broadway (road). The tram tracks merge onto South Langworthy Road north of the stop.

Broadway for a short time was the terminus of the Eccles Line, however the line was extended further to the current and intended terminus of Eccles on 21 July 2000, after seven months.

== History ==
Construction work on the Eccles Line officially began on 17 July 1997, and the Eccles Line was officially opened as far as Broadway tram stop on 6 December 1999.

Two new double-sided display boards were added to one platform each in the early 2010s, along with all other tram stops on the Metrolink. The first were switched on following 9 May 2013 mostly in the city centre, however the ones at Broadway were switched on some time after this. An old display board still hangs on the inbound (Manchester-bound) platform from a lamppost.

== Layout ==
=== Tram stop ===
Broadway tram stop was constructed with accessibility in mind. Two access ramps are at both ends of both platforms. Two dot matrix passenger information displays stand serving one platform each, and show estimated arrival times for trams in minutes up to 30 minutes prior (up to three at a time) and number of carriages.

=== Track layout ===
The original Eccles Line ran between Harbour City and Broadway directly, taking a sharp turn to the right (north) to reach Broadway. The spur to MediaCityUK was opened in 2010, and it only runs single-track for most of its length, only separating into two tracks again at the tram stop itself to serve its two platforms. Trams from MediaCityUK can run to Broadway and Harbour City directly, forming a delta junction with the original Eccles Line route. Since the spur is single-track and the main Eccles Line double-track, crossovers are used at both Harbour City and Broadway to push trams running from the spur onto the correct side (and vice versa for trams wanting to merge onto the spur from the Eccles Line). These crossovers were put in place with the original opening of the line to Broadway, which allowed trams to terminate at either one of Broadway's platforms in 1999.

== Services ==
Every route across the Manchester Metrolink network operates to a 12-minute headway (5 tph) Monday–Saturday, and to a 15-minute headway (4 tph) on Sundays and bank holidays. Sections served by a second "peak only" route (unlike this stop) will have a combined headway of 6 minutes during peak times.

Broadway is located in Zone 2 and the stop itself has two platforms which aren't numbered. Trams towards Manchester heading to Ashton-under-Lyne depart from the inbound platform (east), and trams to Eccles stop at the outbound platform (west).

Preceding station	Manchester Metrolink	Following station
Langworthy towards Eccles	Eccles–Ashton (peak only)	Harbour City towards Ashton-under-Lyne
Langworthy towards Eccles	Eccles–Ashton via MediaCityUK (off-peak only)	MediaCityUK towards Ashton-under-Lyne

== Transport connections ==
=== Bus ===
Broadway tram stop is served closest by Bee Network bus routes 29 (Walkden-The Lowry) and 50 (East Didsbury-MediaCityUK), the former running along Broadway (road) and the latter turning to the north after Michigan Avenue bus stop onto South Langworthy Road.

=== Train ===
This tram stop is not connected to or near to any railway stations, but the nearest is Salford Crescent, and is about 1.3 miles (2.1 km) away walking.

== Incidents ==
- 21 September 2010: Some services were suspended following a tram's (fleet no. 3002) derailment. The track singles for the MediaCityUK branch, and a tram was departing MediaCityUK heading to Harbour City (towards Manchester) at this time, which meant it had to use a crossover track to enter the correct platform. Another tram (3002) heading towards MediaCityUK was required to stop for the first tram to exit the single track section before it could enter, however the driver ended up going too far and partially passed over the spring-loaded points which were already set for the first tram, but had now only partially changed position. No collisions between the two trams occurred, however when the driver of 3002 reversed to clear the way for the tram in the single-track section, it straddled two tracks which caused the tram to hit a central support column. During this incident, services along the Eccles Line were suspended, and replacement buses ran between Manchester Piccadilly Gardens and Eccles Interchange. The incident was expected to last into the Wednesday 22 September morning rush hour, and the line reopened at 08:00 BST on that day, however the MediaCityUK spur remained closed until overhead equipment could be repaired.

== See also ==
- MediaCityUK
