= Bombardier M5000 =

High-floor light rail vehicle

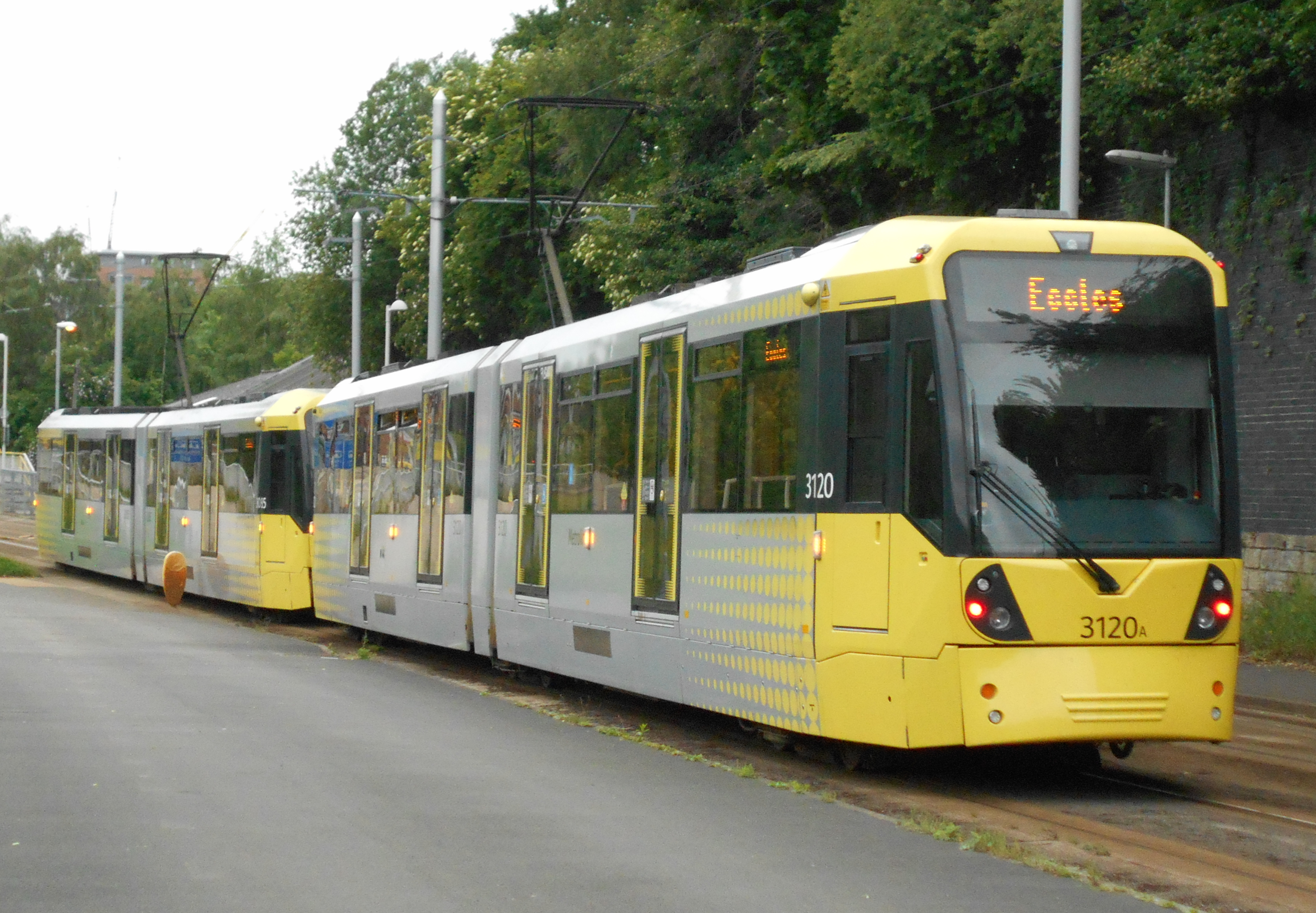
- A coupled pair of M5000s, nos 3120 (Foreground) and 3085 (Background) approaching Holt Town

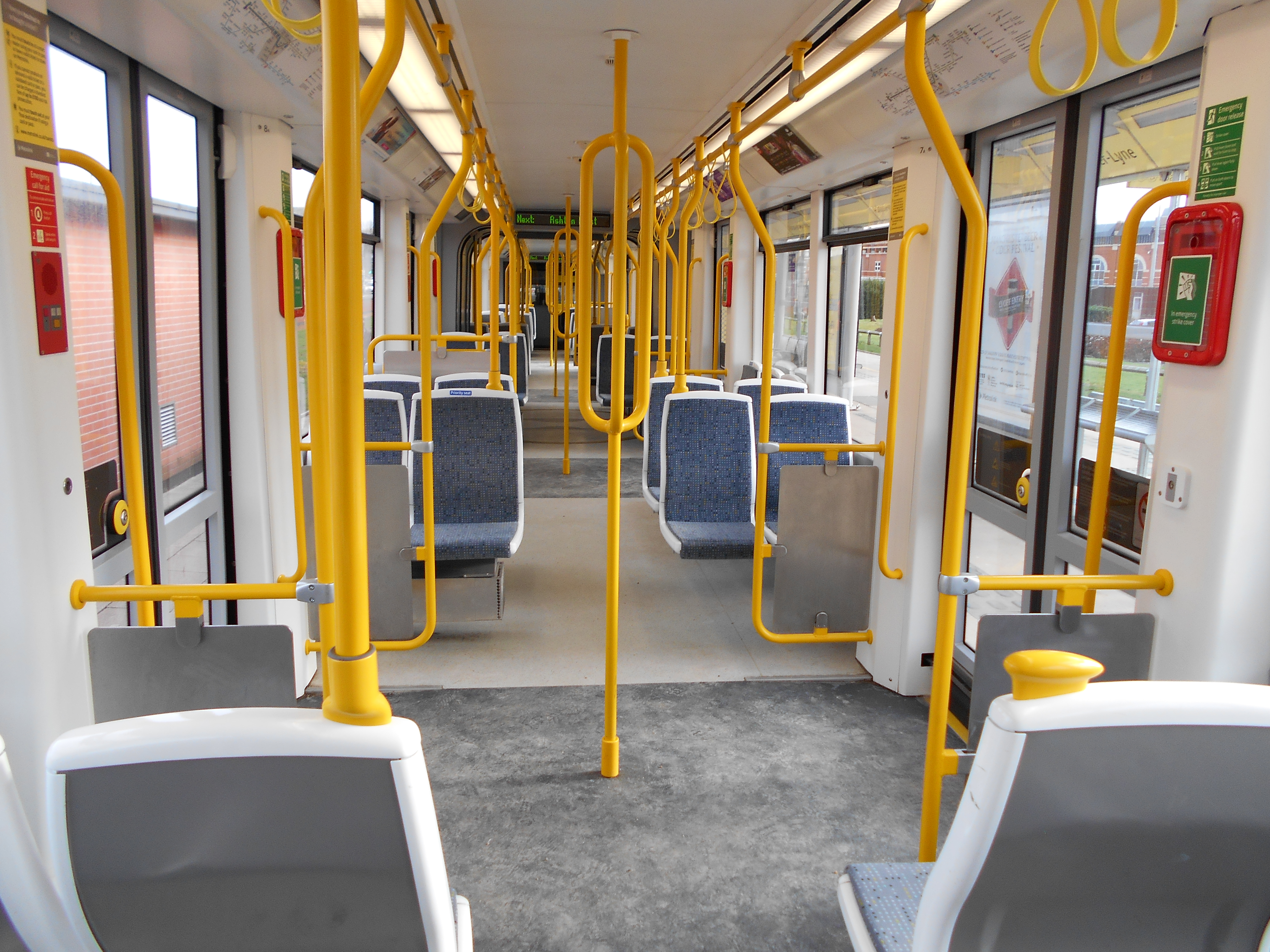
- Interior of a 60 Seat M5000
- In service: 16 December 2009 – present
- Manufacturers: Bombardier Transportation; Alstom
- Built at: Bautzen, Germany; Vienna, Austria
- Family name: Flexity Swift
- Replaced: T-68/T-68A
- Constructed: 2007–2022
- Number built: 147
- Formation: 2 carriages
- Fleet numbers: 3001–3147
- Capacity: 52/8 seats (3001–3074), or 60/6 seats (3075–3147), 146 standing per vehicle
- Operator: Metrolink

Specifications
- Car body construction: Aluminium
- Car length: 28.4 m (93 ft 2 1/8 in)
- Width: 2.65 m (8 ft 8 3/8 in)
- Height: 3.67 m (12 ft 1/2 in)
- Floor height: 980 mm (3 ft 2 5/8 in)
- Platform height: 955–899 mm (3 ft 1 5/8 in – 2 ft 11 3/8 in) (empty, new wheels–loaded, wheels worn)
- Articulated sections: 2
- Wheel diameter: 660–580 mm (26–23 in) (new–worn)
- Wheelbase: 1,800 mm (5 ft 10 7/8 in)
- Maximum speed: 50 mph (80 km/h)
- Weight: 39.7 t (39.1 long tons; 43.8 short tons) per vehicle
- Axle load: 10.45 t (10.28 long tons; 11.52 short tons)
- Traction system: Kiepe Electric UTA 111 IGBT–VVVF
- Traction motors: 4 × Traktionssysteme Austria TMR 36-30-4 120 kW (160 hp)
- Power output: 480 kW (640 hp)
- Transmission: Quill drive
- Gearbox: Voith MGU 120-SV-SZH418
- Gear ratio: 6.29 : 1 (2-stage reduction)
- Acceleration: 1.08 m/s^{2} (3.5 ft/s^{2})
- Deceleration: 1.03 m/s^{2} (3.4 ft/s^{2}) (service); 2.54 m/s^{2} (8.3 ft/s^{2}) (emergency)
- Electric systems: 750 V DC overhead catenary
- Current collection: Pantograph
- UIC classification: Bo′+2′+Bo′
- Bogies: FLEXX Urban 2500
- Minimum turning radius: 25 m (82 ft 0 in) (horizontal); 400 m (1,312 ft 4 in) (vertical)
- Safety systems: ATS, VRS
- Coupling system: Scharfenberg
- Track gauge: 1,435 mm (4 ft 8 1/2 in) standard gauge

Notes/references
- Sourced from except where noted.

The Bombardier M5000 is a model of high-floor passenger light rail vehicles. It is part of the Flexity Swift range of vehicles, built specifically as a high-floor, articulated bi-directional tram to operate solely on the Manchester Metrolink system in England. The Metrolink system is the only tram network in the United Kingdom capable of running services made up of numerous tram sets, and consequently, the M5000s can operate as either a single vehicle or coupled together to form a "double" unit.

A total of 147 trams were ordered between 2007 and 2018, with the first M5000 entering service on 16 December 2009. Following the withdrawal of the last T-68 and T-68A trams in May 2014, the M5000s have operated all Metrolink services.

== History ==
In April 2007, eight Bombardier Flexity Swift trams were ordered by the Greater Manchester Passenger Transport Executive (GMPTE) for Metrolink; these were intended to supplement the existing T-68/T-68A fleet and increase capacity on the Bury-Altrincham line, which was suffering from overcrowding. Based on the K5000 design used in the German cities of Cologne and Bonn, these were designated the M5000. On 13 July 2009, the first M5000 (numbered 3001) was delivered to Manchester.

The M5000s were built by Bombardier Transportation at the factories in Bautzen, Germany and Vienna, Austria with the first vehicle built tested on the Wiener Straßenbahn street network, Vienna. Electrical equipment was supplied by Vossloh Kiepe of Werdohl, Germany. Unlike the previous T-68/T-68A trams, the M5000s lacked retractable steps, as a result the low-height platforms on several of the stops in central Manchester were either raised or removed to create an entirely high-floor network.

A further four were ordered in November 2007 (Nos. 3009-3012) to allow for a 12-minute service between Cornbrook and the new MediaCityUK extension in Salford Quays. Another 28 were then ordered (Nos. 3013-3040) to complete the tram order for the Phase 3A expansion of the network. After funding had been secured for the Phase 3B expansion of the network, another 22 M5000s were ordered (Nos. 3041-3062).

Meanwhile, the M5000 trams were proving to be considerably more reliable than the older T-68/T-68A fleet, which were found to be in need of expensive overhauls to keep them in service. In 2011, Transport for Greater Manchester (TfGM) decided it would be more cost effective to replace the entire 32 strong T-68/T-68A fleet with M5000s than to overhaul them, and so 32 more M5000s were ordered in two batches of 12 and then 20 (Nos. 3063-3094) in order to replace them.

In 2013, ten more trams were ordered in anticipation of the Trafford Park Line before the production line closed. In September 2014, TfGM ordered a further 16, bringing the total number of units ordered to 120. The last of this order was delivered in October 2016.

In July 2018, a further 27 trams were ordered to help relieve overcrowding at a cost of £72m. The first of these was delivered on 14 November 2020. Alstom purchased Bombardier Transportation in January 2021, taking over production of the M5000. The final tram (numbered 3147) was delivered on 24 September 2022, taking the fleet to a total of 147 trams.

Units ordered
| Batch | Qty. | Ordered for |
|---|---|---|
| Apr 2007 | 8 | Capacity enhancement |
| Nov 2007 | 4 | MediaCityUK spur |
| 2008 | 28 | Oldham, Rochdale, Droylsden, and Chorlton |
| Mar 2010 | 8 | Ashton and Didsbury |
| Aug 2010 | 14 | Manchester Airport |
| 2011 | 12 | Replacement for T68s |
| 2012 | 20 | Replacement for T68s |
| 2013 | 10 | Trafford Park (but instead introduced early to lengthen existing services) |
| 2014 | 16 | Capacity enhancement |
| 2018 | 27 | Capacity enhancement and for the Trafford Park Line |

== Description ==
Each vehicle is 28.4 m (93 ft) long and has three bogies, the outer two of which are powered, while the unpowered central bogie supports the articulation gangway. Numbers 3001 to 3074 have 52 standard seats with a further eight "perch" seats, while numbers 3075 upwards have 60 standard seats and six perch seats. On numbers 3001 to 3074, there are two wheelchair spaces, one in each half of the tram; which increased to four spaces for numbers 3075 upwards. At a standard four persons per square metre there is space for 146 standing passengers, giving each vehicle a total peak capacity of 206 passengers.

The M5000 can be operated as a single vehicle or as a double, the latter providing capacity for over 400 passengers at any one time. The trams are equipped with a passenger information system to deliver timely and relevant travelling information using a Lawo Luminator Europa 'IBIS' (Integrated Board Information System). This is a relatively primitive system that works on wheel rotations, and relies on the driver inputting the relevant 'IBIS code' to display the correct destination.

== In service ==
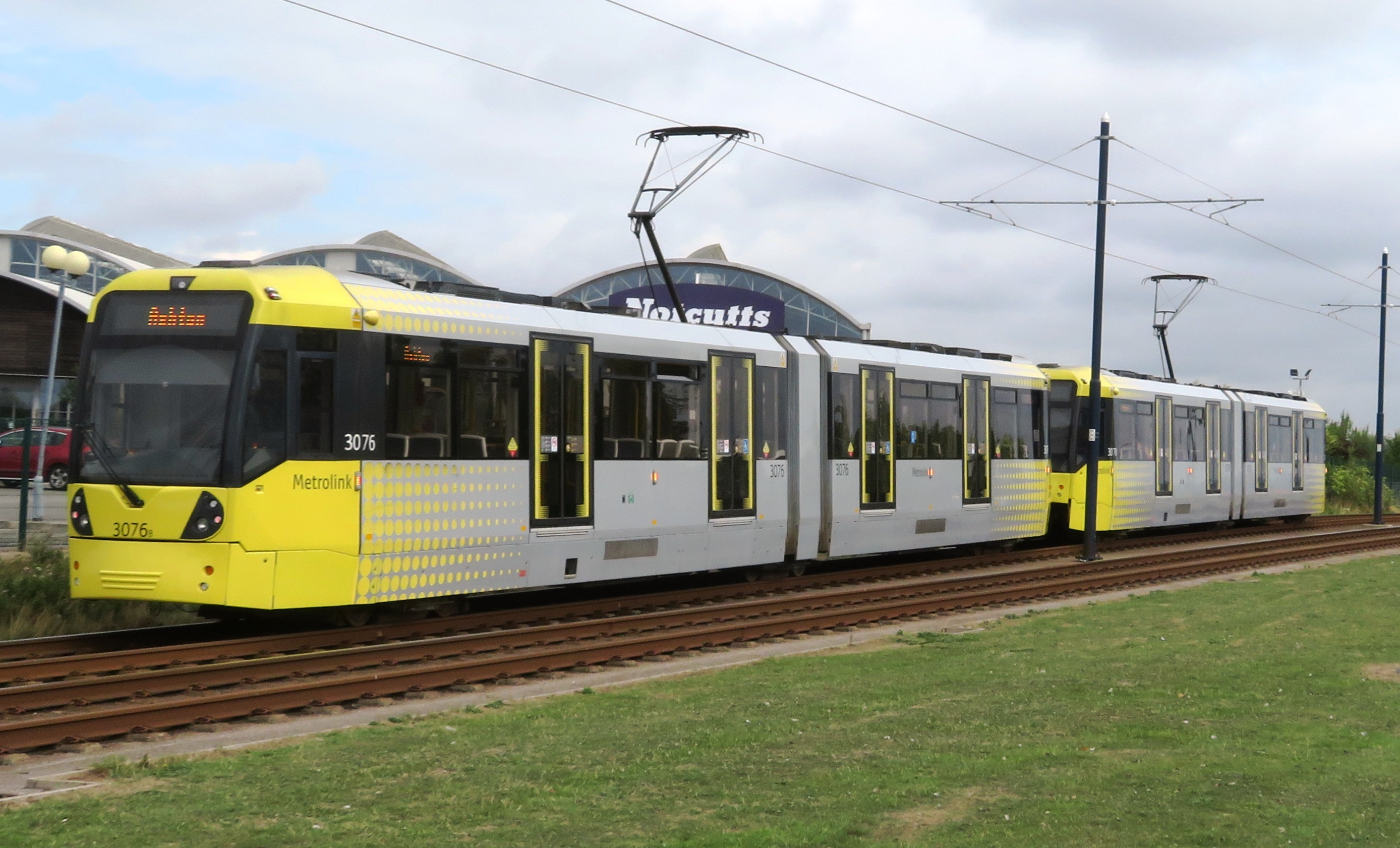
Two M5000s operating as a double on the East Manchester Line.

The M5000s operate all Metrolink services. They operate both singularly and as a double, denoted by dbl for a double on passenger information displays. Multiple M5000s are able to be coupled and operate as triple and quadruple units however this only happens in case of emergency such as a tram unit breaking down.

The first 60 units (3001–60) were either delivered with, or retrofitted from withdrawn T68s, automatic tram stop (ATS) and vehicle recognition system (VRS) equipment and can be used anywhere on the Metrolink network. Units 3061-3147 have never been fitted with this equipment and cannot be used in-between Timperley and Altrincham where the line is operated by Network Rail. During disruption, the non ATS/VRS vehicles can occasionally be found terminating at Timperley but this is infrequent. Some of the 3001-60 batch have since had the ATS/VRS removed when the equipment has failed, with the reduction of ATS signalling across the network there is no need for a full 60 vehicles to be fitted. As of January 2022 the VRS has been completely withdrawn from all units, as the last section of line that had it is now completely line of sight.

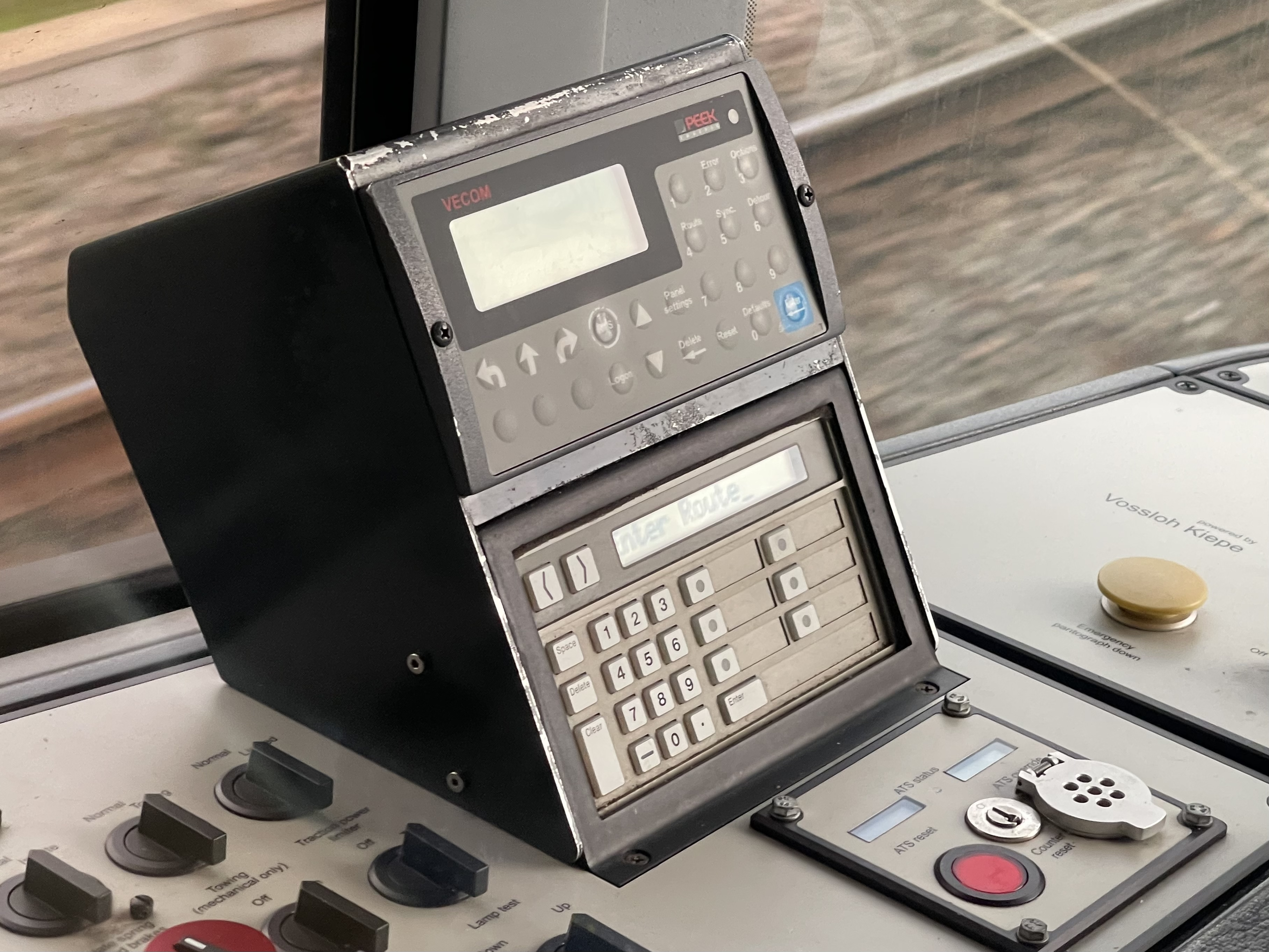
TMS, VRS and ATS in M5000 3009

Like their predecessors the T-68s, the M5000s are fitted with two warning devices in the form of a street whistle and segregated horn. The two sound effects are stored as WAV files and played by a speaker underneath the cab. Unlike the T-68s however, these are electronic rather than the air-chime whistle and airhorn fitted to the T-68s. Both utilise a loudspeaker underneath the cab floor facing forwards, and are operated by foot pedals in the cab. The frequent 'toot' sounds of the street whistle are a recognisable symbol of the Metrolink network and common background noise in Manchester city centre. A freedom of information (FOI) request made in 2021 released the WAV files, finalised on 14 Feb 2008, for public download.
