= Manchester docks =

Series of docks in Manchester, England

Coordinates: 53.4666°N 2.2755°W

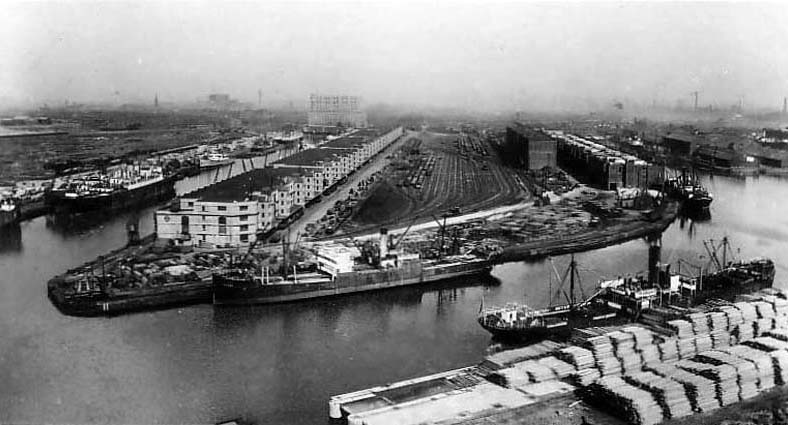
Manchester Dock 9 (top left) at the beginning of the 20th century. Dock 8 is to the right, and the ship canal is in the foreground.

Manchester docks were nine docks in Salford, Stretford and Manchester, at the eastern end of the Manchester Ship Canal in North West England, which formed part of the Port of Manchester from 1894 until their closure in 1982. They marked the upper reaches of the ship canal, and were a destination for both coastal and ocean-bound vessels carrying cargo and passengers, often travelling to and from Canada.

Manchester docks were divided into two sections; the larger Salford docks to the west of the Trafford Road swing bridge and Pomona docks to the east. Each section consisted of four docks in total, the largest being to the west; Dock 5 at Pomona was never fully completed. Of the eight working docks only one, Dock 1 at Pomona, was within Manchester itself.

In the 1970s the docks began a rapid decline, largely due to containerisation. The increasing size of freight-carrying ships meant they could no longer navigate the Manchester Ship Canal and this, combined with increased trading with Europe and the East, saw use of Manchester Docks decrease. In 1982, the remaining docks closed and the area became derelict. Salford City Council bought the docks in 1984 using a derelict land grant and their redevelopment as Salford Quays began 1985, transforming the area for commercial, residential and leisure use.

== Salford docks ==
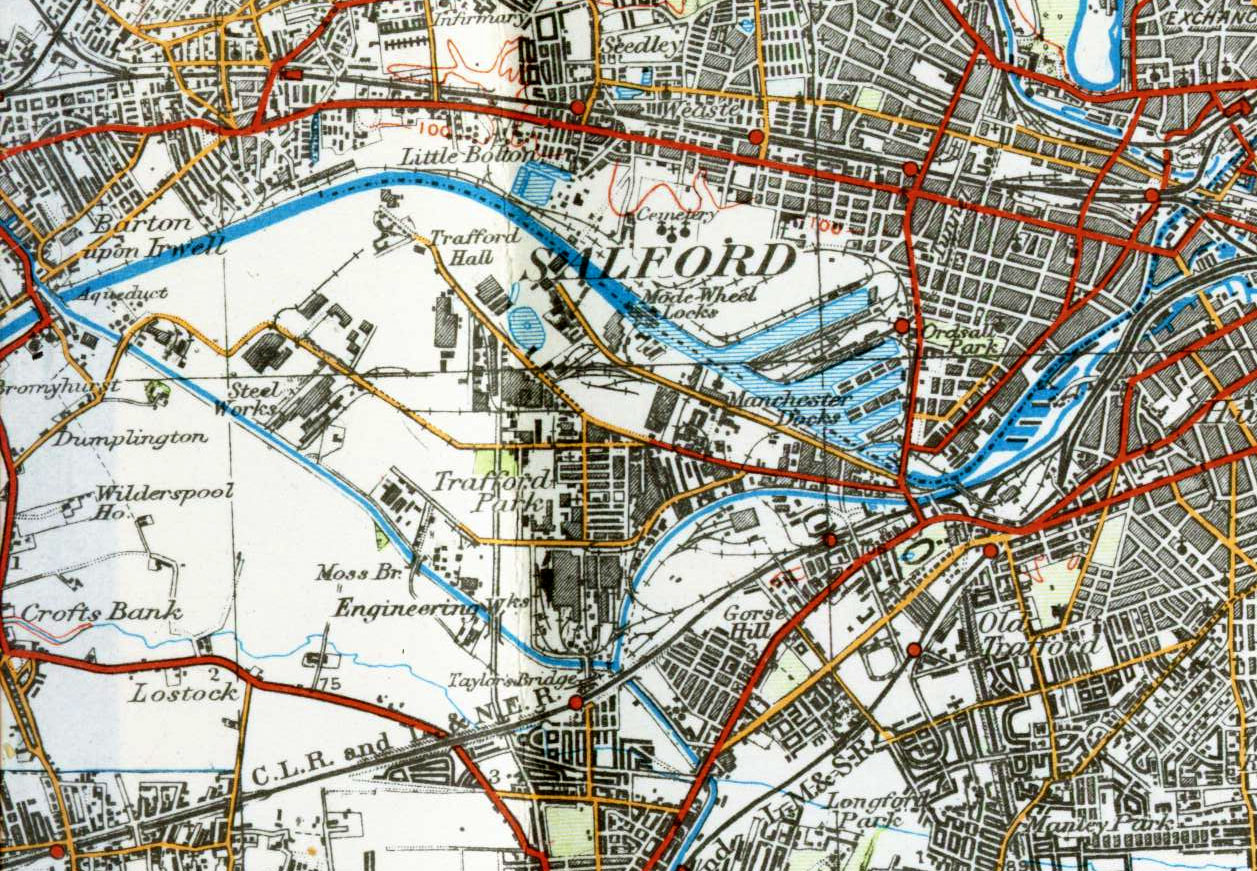
1924 map of Manchester docks

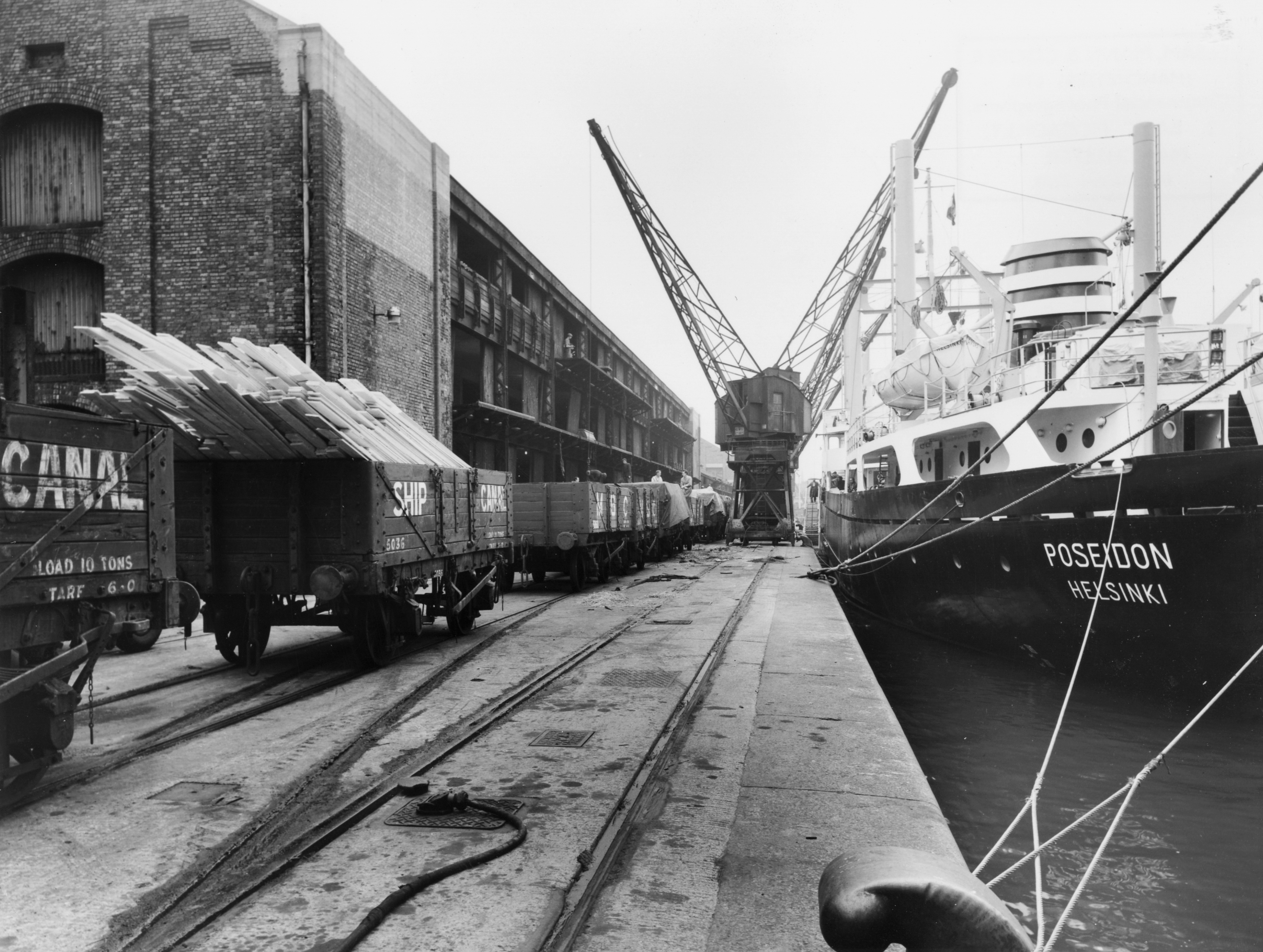
Manchester docks in the late 1950s

The Salford docks are the western (downstream) block, made of four large docks running ENE from the canal, numbered 9, 8, 7 and 6, the last three off a turning basin. They have now been redeveloped into Salford Quays.

- Dock 9 is the largest of the docks and was the site of the Manchester Liners container service to Montreal, Quebec. Today the upper reaches contain cleaned water and have been cut off from their former connection to the ship canal. This cleaned water is accessed from Dock 8 via a new canal through Pier 8, while the lower section remains open to ship canal traffic. This dock was the last to be constructed, built on the former New Barnes site of Manchester Racecourse, and opened in the early years of the 20th century.
- Dock 8 remains largely intact, although its entrance to the ship canal has been made considerably narrower. It is now accessed through a lock beneath a pedestrian drawbridge, which is used as a buffer to separate the cleaned water of docks 7, 8 and 9 from the relatively untreated water of the ship canal. This is the only route into the redeveloped basins of docks 9 and 7. The lock and drawbridge are mechanised and controlled from the Salford Quays Operations Tower.
- Dock 7 has been cut off from the ship canal and divided into a series of small basins, linking Piers 6 and 7 by road and pedestrian footbridges. The basins provide a habitat for wildlife and the introduced fish stock. Access is again from Dock 8, at its north eastern end.
- Dock 6 is retained in largely its original configuration.

The smaller basins into which the docks have been divided are all named after North American lakes, reflecting the area's strong trading links the docks had with North America.

Upstream of Dock 6 there is a triangular depression in the canal wall on a similar alignment to the other docks: this was originally a second navigable channel under a fixed road bridge. At the end of the 19th century the channel was infilled above the bridge and the remainder retained as a wharf. Later this arm was further truncated into the vestige seen today.

While Dock 9 was being built there were plans to construct a further dock (Dock 10) downstream of, and parallel to, Dock 9. Maps from 1921 still show the proposed dock, but it is omitted on later editions.

== Pomona docks ==
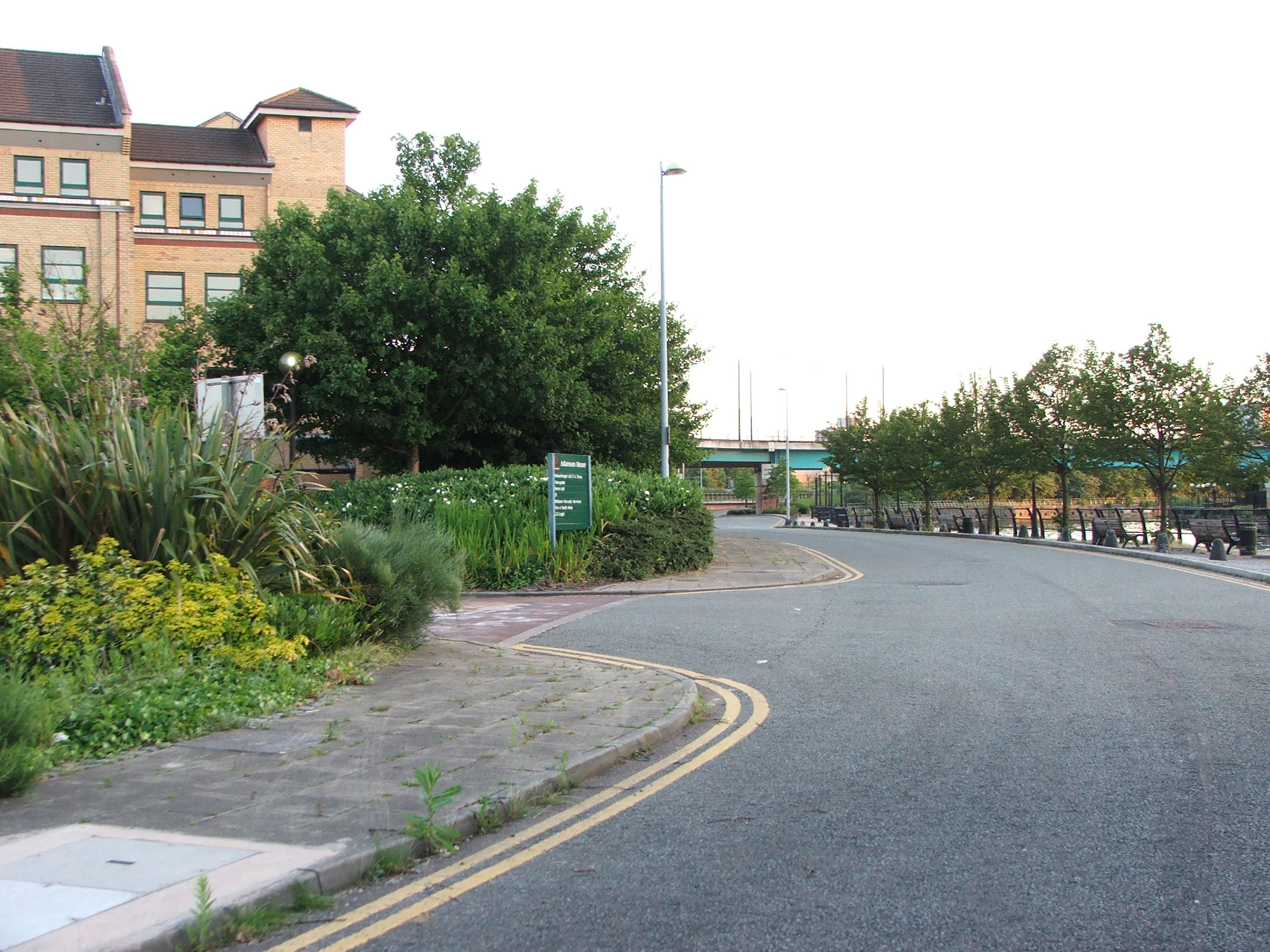
Modern office development at Pomona docks in Trafford. Little remains to show that this was once a busy working waterfront.

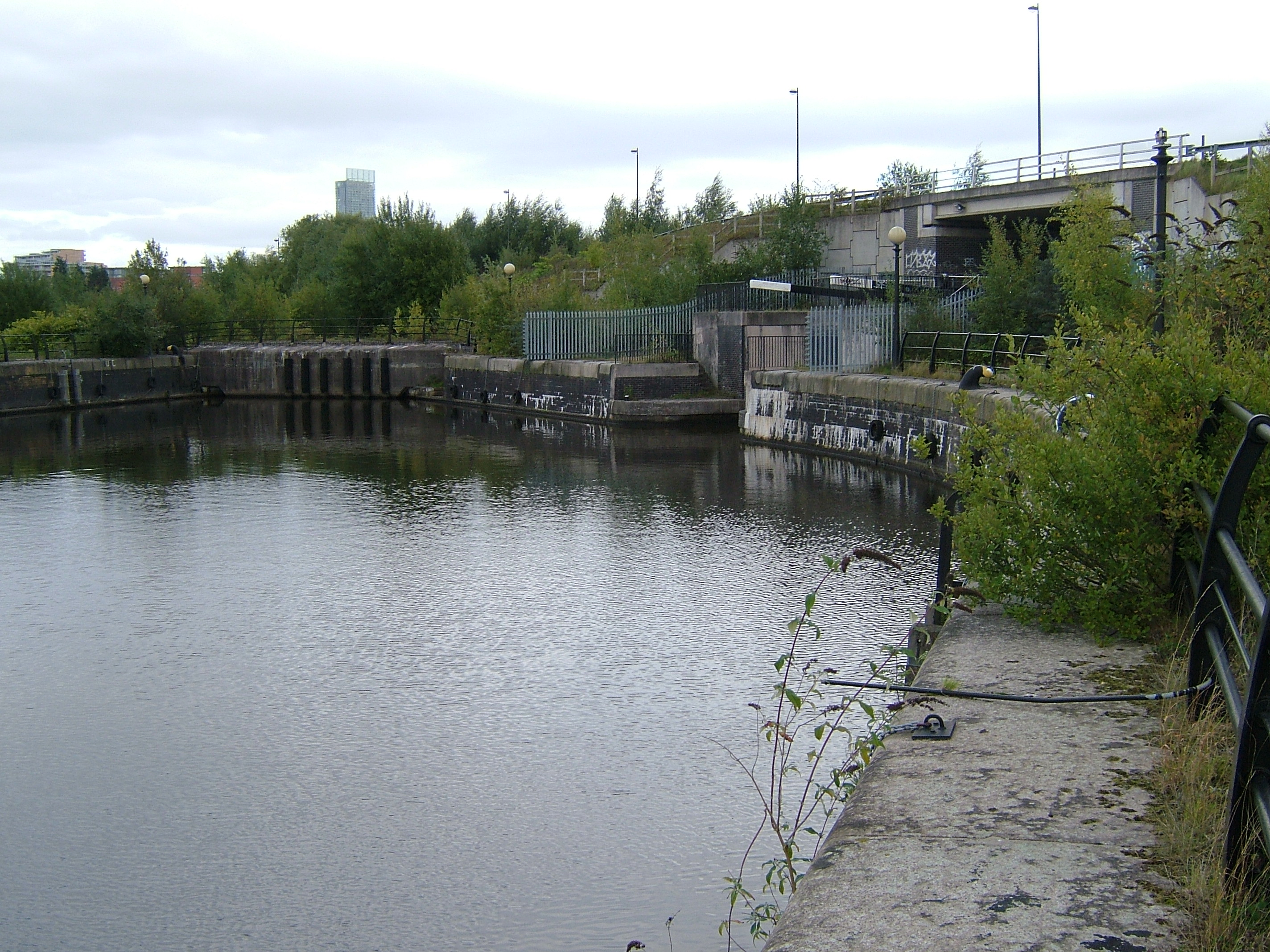
Dock 3, entrance to the Bridgewater Canal locks

Pomona docks was a set of five docks on Pomona Island, by the Manchester Ship Canal. Unlike the former docks in what is now Salford Quays, there has been little redevelopment.

Dock 5, Ordsall Dock, was a rectangular dock on the opposite bank to the other docks, and was situated directly opposite docks 3-4. Docks 4-2 left the canal at an angle, running east from the canal, each around 200 yards (180 m) long, whilst Dock 1 (mostly in the City of Manchester) was somewhat longer at 233 yards (213 m), and ran almost parallel to the canal in a NE direction.

- Dock 5 was infilled at the end of the 19th century, during the construction of Dock 9.
- Dock 4 has now been entirely infilled, and almost no trace remains on the ground, although vague outlines of the dock can still be seen on aerial photographs.
- Dock 3 remains intact, having been later used as the point for Pomona Lock (which connects the Manchester Ship Canal to the Bridgewater Canal, replacing the redundant Hulme Lock further upstream).
- Dock 2 has been infilled along most of its length, although a short stump of the dock remains connected to the canal.
- Dock 1 has been infilled, although a depression in the canal bank exists across the former dock mouth.

The official terminus of the canal is several hundred metres further up the canal, at a point where it is crossed by a footbridge. Between the four main docks and Pomona docks was a swinging road bridge. In the 1960s its openings and closings were announced by a man blowing a hunting horn.

The Pomona docks were built on the site of the Pomona Gardens, named after the Roman goddess Pomona. The swinging roadbridge separating Salford Quays from Pomona docks is now permanently closed, and only small pleasure craft can pass under it into Pomona docks. The gardens gave their name to a public house at Cornbrook. The area is served by the Pomona tram stop on the Manchester Metrolink.

== See also ==
- River Irwell
