= MediaCityUK tram stop =

Manchester Metrolink tram stop

MediaCityUK
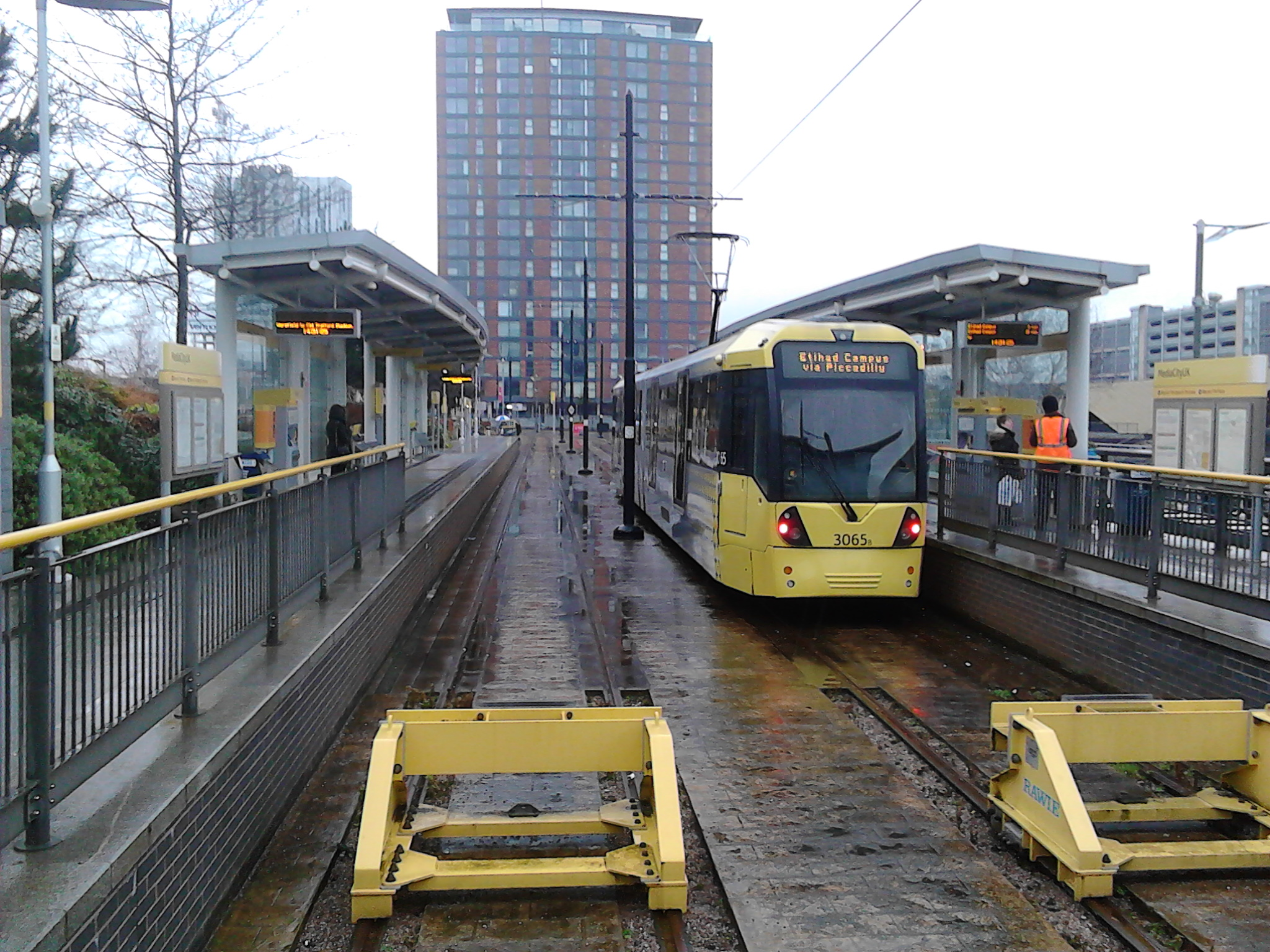
- MediaCityUK tram stop in February 2018.

General information
- Location: MediaCityUK, Salford; England
- Coordinates: 53.47215°N 2.29727°W
- Grid reference: SJ803973
- System: Manchester Metrolink
- Operator: KeolisAmey
- Transit authority: Transport for Greater Manchester
- Line: Eccles Line
- Platforms: 2
- Tram routes

Construction
- Structure type: At-grade
- Accessible: Yes

Other information
- Status: In operation
- Station code: MEC
- Fare zone: 2
- Website: MediaCityUK tram stop

History
- Opened: 20 September 2010; 15 years ago
Route map
Location

MediaCityUK is a Manchester Metrolink tram stop in Salford Quays, Salford. It is the only station and the terminus of a short spur off the Eccles Line and is in fare zone 2. This stop was opened on 20 September 2010 and has step-free access.

The stop is located at street-level. It is on the north side of Salford Quays, adjacent to Dock 9 and the Manchester Ship Canal (border between Salford and Trafford). Serving MediaCityUK, it is also near to The Lowry, other parts of Salford Quays, and Imperial War Museum North (though there is a different tram stop on the Trafford Park Line serving it closer). It is one of eight Metrolink stops serving the Salford Quays area.

== History ==
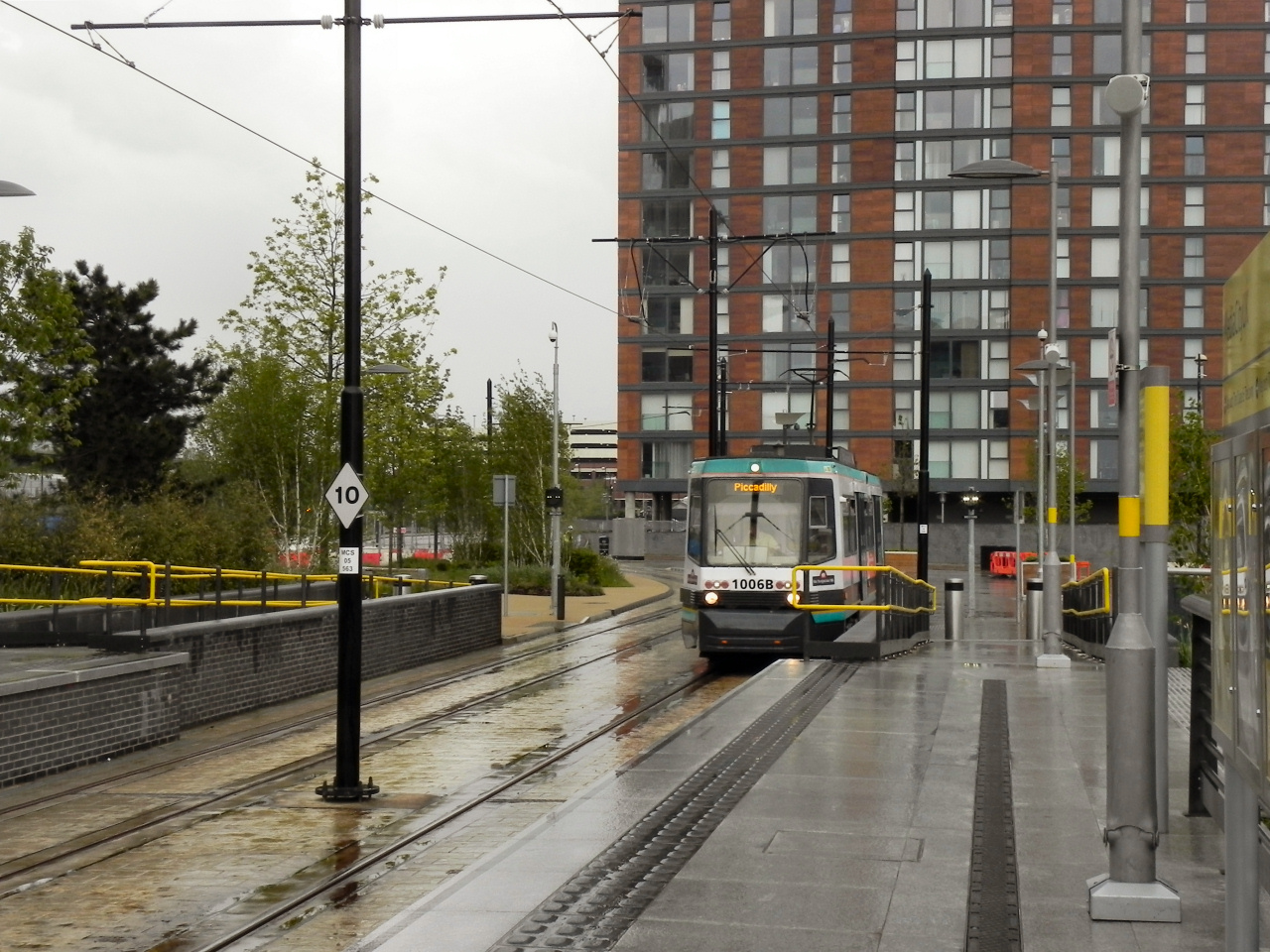
A now retired T68 tram arriving at MediaCityUK in May 2011.

MediaCityUK is a development within Salford Quays, on the site of the former Manchester Docks. When an active port, the quays were served by numerous railway goods lines.

The Metrolink's extension to Salford Quays was part of an urban renewal project for the area around the Manchester Ship Canal. Plans for a light rail system in this area have existed since around 1987, initially as far as Broadway; the proposals evolved and included a possible branch line to serve the Lowry. The MediaCityUK spur replaced that proposal. The stop opened on 20 September 2010 at the end of a 360-metre spur (0.22 mi) from the Eccles Line (which opened to Broadway in 1999 and Eccles in 2000).

== Layout ==
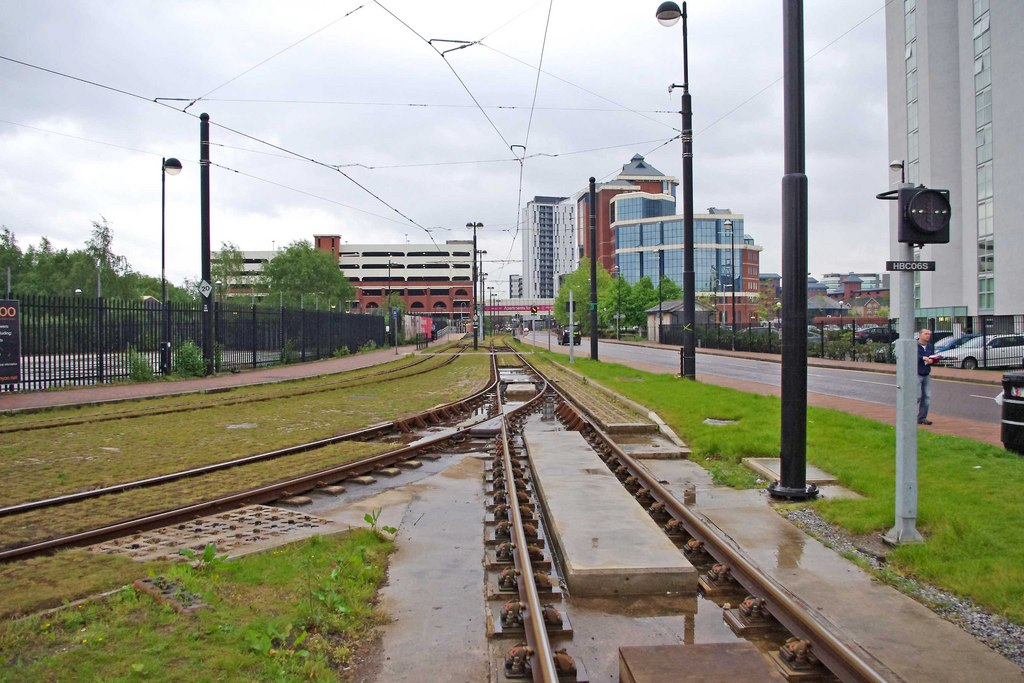
Part of the track layout visible at the Eccles Line/MediaCityUK junction. The single track used by Harbour City - MediaCityUK trams merges into the Eccles Line from the bottom of the picture.

=== Tram stop ===
MediaCityUK tram stop was constructed with accessibility in mind. Disabled access ramps lead up to both platforms from the east, and from the west are steps, though there is another step-free route available. Two dot matrix passenger information displays stand one on each platform, and show estimated arrival times for trams in minutes up to 30 minutes prior (up to three at a time) and number of carriages.

=== Track layout ===
The original Eccles Line ran between Harbour City and Broadway directly, taking a sharp turn to the right (north) to reach Broadway. The spur was opened in 2010, and it only runs single-track for most of its length, only separating into two tracks again at the tram stop itself to serve its two platforms. Trams from MediaCityUK can run to Broadway and Harbour City directly, forming a delta junction with the original Eccles Line route. Since the spur is single-track and the main Eccles Line double-track, crossovers are used at both Harbour City and Broadway to push trams running from the spur onto the correct side (and vice versa for trams wanting to merge onto the spur from the Eccles Line).

== Services ==
Every route across the Manchester Metrolink network operates to a 12-minute headway (5 tph) Monday–Saturday, and to a 15-minute headway (4 tph) on Sundays and bank holidays. Sections served by a second "peak only" route will have a combined headway of 6 minutes during peak times. However, even though two tram routes run to this stop, since they alternate during service hours, MediaCityUK actually only receives 5 trams an hour (every 12 minutes).

MediaCityUK is located in Zone 2, and the stop itself has two platforms which are lettered A and B. The default platform for trams to enter MediaCityUK is usually Platform A (southernmost), however this may change during service disruptions. If one platform is occupied and another tram needs to use the stop, it will just use the other platform: there is no allocated platform for different destinations.

Preceding station	Manchester Metrolink	Following station
Broadway towards Eccles	Eccles–Ashton via MediaCityUK (off-peak only)	Harbour City towards Ashton-under-Lyne
Terminus	MediaCityUK–Etihad Campus (peak only)	Harbour City towards Etihad Campus

=== Imperial War Museum tram stop ===
MediaCityUK is about a 8-minute walk away from Imperial War Museum tram stop on the Trafford Park Line, which makes for a convenient interchange for passengers, though it isn't stated as an official interchange by Transport for Greater Manchester. Trams usually depart MediaCityUK heading towards Manchester about 10 minutes before another tram to Manchester departs from Imperial War Museum. Since the Trafford Park Line is a little faster than the Eccles Line, it makes for a potentially faster way to get to the city centre than just waiting for the next tram at MediaCityUK.

Preceding station	Manchester Metrolink	Following station
Village towards The Trafford Centre	The Trafford Centre–Deansgate	Wharfside towards Deansgate-Castlefield

== Transport connections ==
=== Bus ===
MediaCityUK tram stop is served closest by Bee Network bus routes 29, 30, 50, 51, 53, and 79 on The Quays (road), the most frequent being route 50 (East Didsbury-MediaCityUK).

=== Train ===
This tram stop is not connected to or near to any railway stations, but the nearest is Trafford Park, approximately 1.7 miles (2.7 km) away walking.

== Incidents ==
- 21 September 2010: On the second day of operation, services to this tram stop were suspended following a tram's (fleet no. 3002) derailment. The track singles for the MediaCityUK branch, and a tram was departing MediaCityUK heading to Harbour City (towards Manchester) at this time, which meant it had to use a crossover track to enter the correct platform. Another tram (3002) heading towards MediaCityUK was required to stop for the first tram to exit the single track section before it could enter, however the driver ended up going too far and partially passed over the spring-loaded points which were already set for the first tram, but had now only partially changed position. No collisions between the two trams occurred, however when the driver of 3002 reversed to clear the way for the tram in the single-track section, it straddled two tracks which caused the tram to hit a central support column.

== See also ==
- MediaCityUK
- Imperial War Museum North
- Salford Quays
