= Alderley Edge railway station =

Railway station in Cheshire, England

Alderley Edge
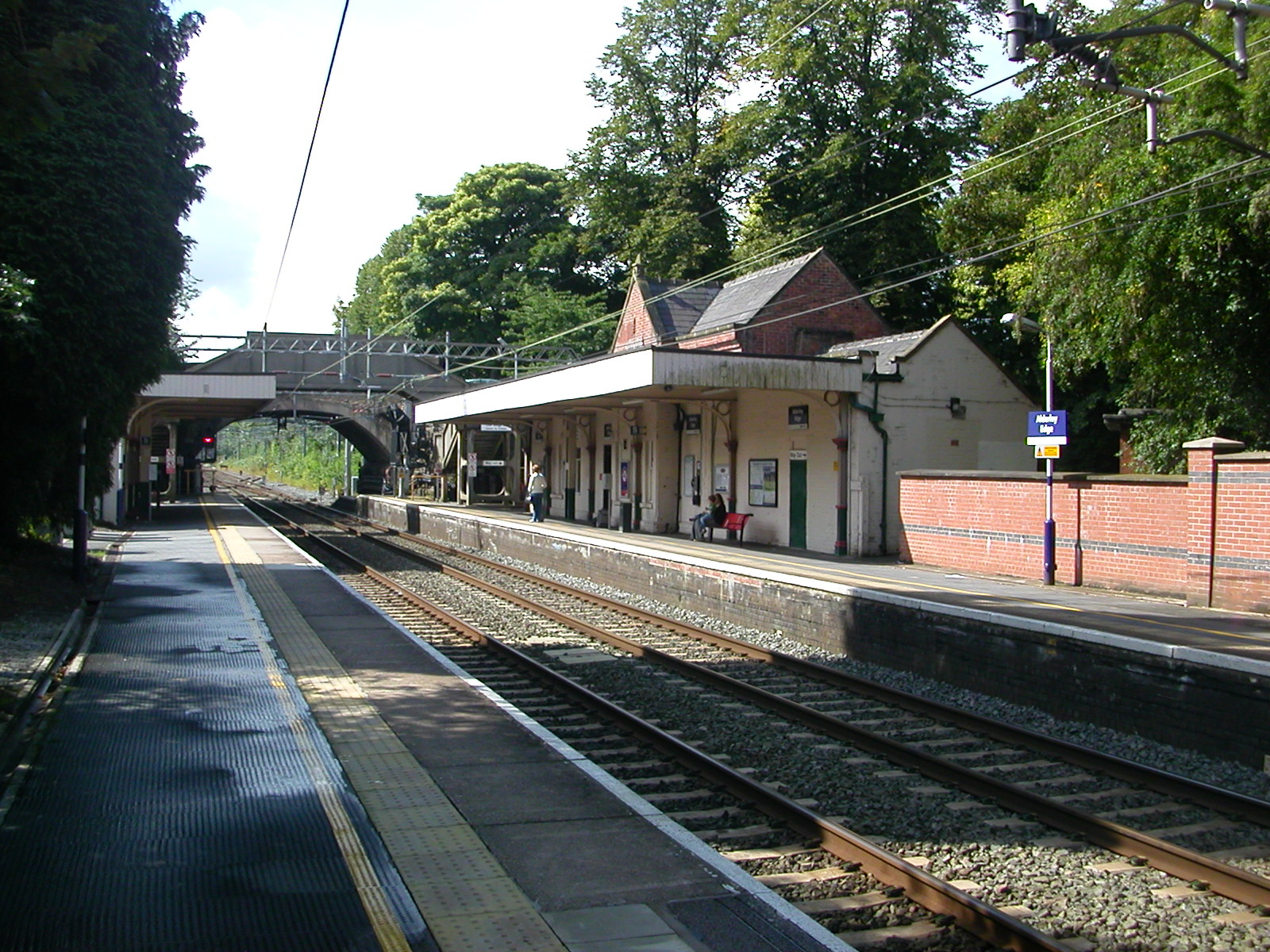
- Southward view from the Crewe-bound platform, 2007

General information
- Location: Alderley Edge, Cheshire East, England
- Coordinates: 53.304°N 2.237°W
- Grid reference: SJ843785
- Managed by: Northern Trains
- Platforms: 2

Other information
- Station code: ALD
- Classification: DfT category E

Key dates
- 10 May 1842: Opened as Alderley
- April 1853: Renamed to Alderley & Chorley
- January 1876: Renamed to Alderley Edge
- 26 June 1959: Signal box closed

Passengers
- 2020/21: ▼72,348
- 2021/22: ▲0.197 million
- 2022/23: ▲0.227 million
- 2023/24: ▲0.239 million
- 2024/25: ▲0.244 million
Location
Notes
- Passenger statistics from the Office of Rail and Road

Alderley Edge railway station serves the large village of Alderley Edge, in Cheshire, England. The station lies 13 3/4 miles (22.1 km) south of Manchester Piccadilly on the Crewe to Manchester Line. It is managed by Northern Trains, which also operates the majority of services along with Transport for Wales.

== History ==
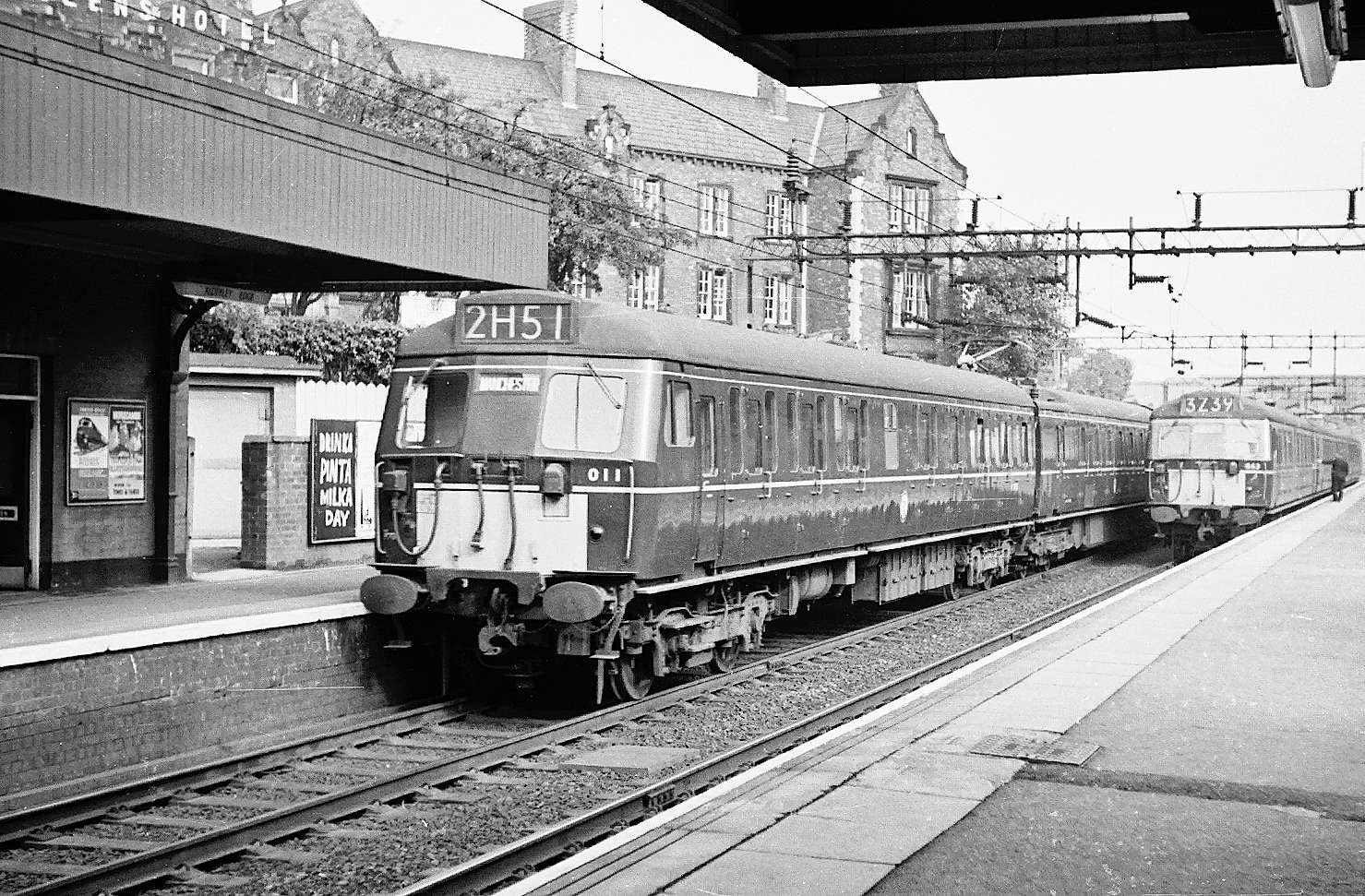
Two AM4 electric multiple units at the station, October 1962

Opened by the Manchester and Birmingham Railway, then absorbed by the London and North Western Railway, the line became part of the London, Midland and Scottish Railway during the Grouping of 1923. It then passed on to the London Midland Region of British Railways on nationalisation in 1948.

When sectorisation was introduced, the station was served by Regional Railways on behalf of the Greater Manchester Passenger Transport Executive until the privatisation of British Rail.

The line was electrified in 1960, as the first stage of the West Coast Main Line electrification project; since then, the station has acted as a terminus for some local services from the Manchester direction. Both platforms are bi-directionally signalled to facilitate this and there are turnback sidings provided close to the station to allow empty stock to be stabled clear of the main line.

== Layout ==
Alderley Edge station has two platforms, both of which have small buildings: the one on platform 1 has a wooden canopy, and houses a waiting area and ticket office; the building on platform 2 is not open to the public. The two platforms are connected by a footbridge and an adjacent road bridge, at the southern end of the station. There are two ticket machines on the western side of the station, accessible from platform 1.

Vehicle access is available to the western side of the station, but only for drop-off purposes; for longer stays, a car park is provided to the east.

== Services ==
The station is served by two train operating companies, which operate the following patterns in trains per hour/day (tph/tpd):

Northern Trains provides the following basic weekday service pattern:

- 3 tph to Manchester Piccadilly; of which:
  - 2 tph run via the Stockport route, calling at Wilmslow, Handforth, Cheadle Hulme, Stockport, Heaton Chapel and Levenshulme
  - 1 tph runs via the Styal Line, calling at Wilmslow, Styal, Manchester Airport, Heald Green, Gatley, East Didsbury, Burnage and Mauldeth Road
- 2 tph to Crewe, calling at Chelford, Goostrey, Holmes Chapel and Sandbach.

On Sundays:

- 1 tp2h stopping service in each direction between Crewe and Manchester Piccadilly, via Stockport.

Transport for Wales provides the following basic weekday service pattern:

- 2 tpd to Manchester Piccadilly, via Stockport.

On Saturdays:

- 3 tpd to Manchester Piccadilly, via Stockport.

On Sundays:

- 2 tpd to Manchester Piccadilly; of which:
  - 1 tpd via the Styal Line
  - 1 tpd calling at Wilmslow and Stockport
- 1 tpd express to Crewe.

Preceding station	National Rail	Following station
Chelford	Northern Trains Crewe to Manchester	Wilmslow
Holmes Chapel	Northern Trains Crewe to Manchester	Wilmslow
Terminus	Northern Trains Alderley Edge to Manchester	Wilmslow
Crewe	Transport for Wales Cardiff/Shrewsbury/Crewe to Manchester	Wilmslow
