= Burnage =

Area of Manchester, England

Coordinates: 53.4258°N 2.2108°W

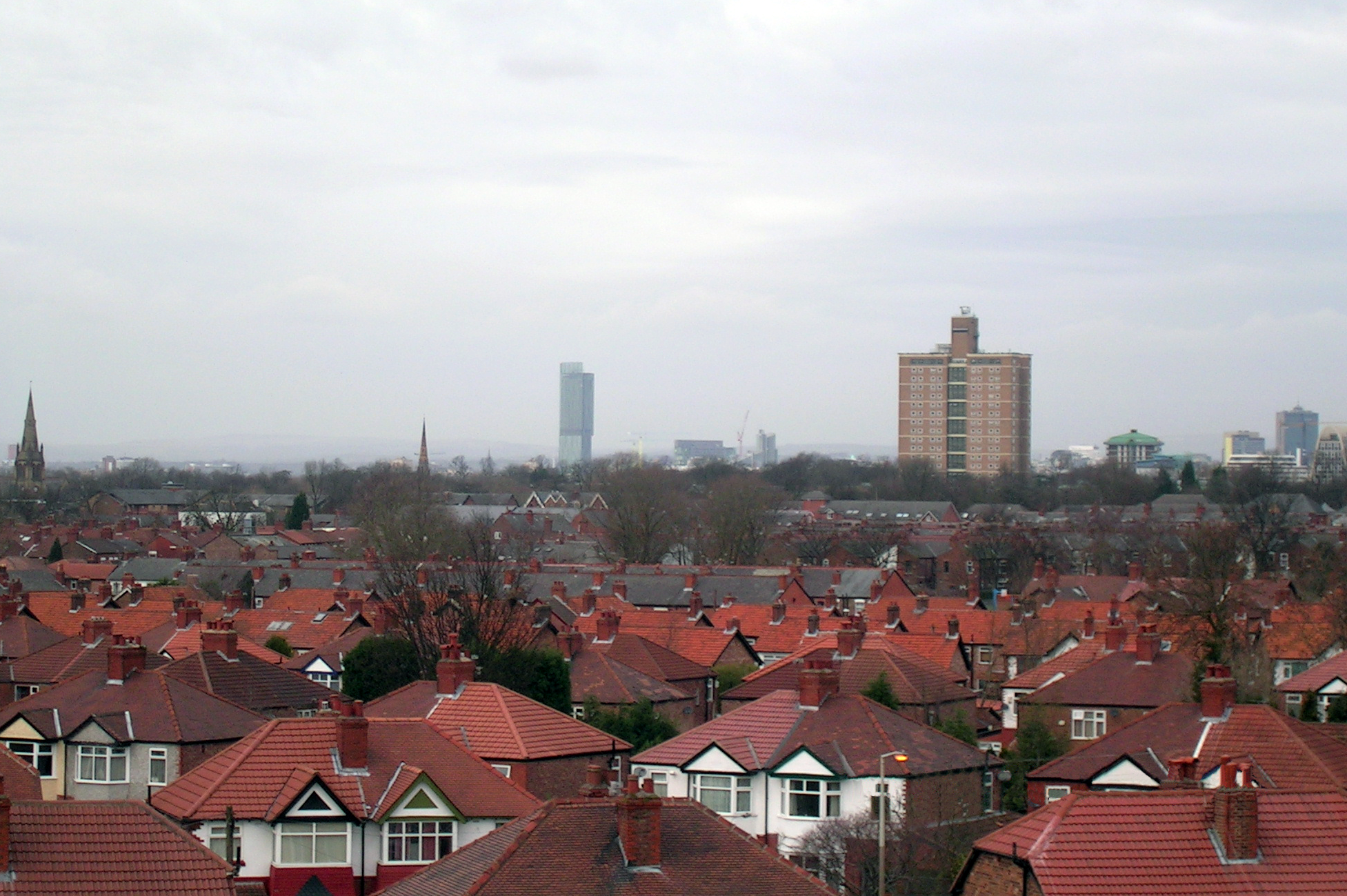
- A view over Burnage, towards Manchester city centre from Mauldeth Road railway station.

- Location within Greater Manchester
- Population: 15,227 (2011)
- OS grid reference: SJ865925
- Metropolitan borough: Manchester
- Metropolitan county: Greater Manchester
- Region: North West
- Country: England
- Sovereign state: United Kingdom
- Post town: MANCHESTER
- Postcode district: M19
- Dialling code: 0161
- Police: Greater Manchester
- Fire: Greater Manchester
- Ambulance: North West
- UK Parliament: Gorton and Denton

Burnage is an area of Manchester, England, 4 miles (6.4 km) south of the city centre, east of Kingsway. The population at the 2011 census was 15,227. It lies between Withington to the west, Levenshulme to the north, Heaton Chapel to the east and Didsbury and Heaton Mersey to the south.

== History ==
=== Toponymy ===
The name Burnage is thought to have stemmed from "Brown Hedge", from the old brown stone walls or "hedges" which were common there in medieval times. In a survey of 1320, the district is referred to as "Bronadge".

=== Middle Ages ===
During the Middle Ages, Burnage was an area of common pasture and marsh land. Burnage did not have its own manor but the land was shared between the farmers from the Manors of Withington and Heaton Norris as it was a border district between two neighbouring lordships. A survey of 1320 records 356 acres of common pasture land under the Manor of Heaton.

As the population began to expand, the land was reclaimed for arable land. In a survey of 1322, the Lord of Manchester was permitted to appropriate more land for arable use, provided he left enough common pasture land for the commoners to graze their animals. Named arable farmers of this time included Thomas Grelley, Sir John de Byron, Sir John de Longford and Dame Joan de Longford, who farmed 136 acres of land subject to the Lord of Manchester. There are records of a sale of land, which refer to "that moiety of the place called Burnage lying next to Heaton", when John La Warre and his wife Joan granted 100 acres of moor and pasture in Heaton and Withington to a Thomas de Trafford.

The Withington land belonging to the de Longford family later passed to the Mosley family and subsequently to the Egerton family. Because the Mosleys were former Lords of the Manor of Withington, the Mosley family's heraldic crest was used as the crest of Withington. A carved Mosley crest can still be seen above the door of the old Withington Town Hall (1881) on Lapwing Lane in West Didsbury. In recognition of the connection with the Withington Manor, the Mosley crest was also adopted in the 20th century as the badge of Burnage High School.

=== 17th—19th centuries ===
By 1655, Burnage had become a township.

The Egerton family were major landowners in Burnage; in 1798, the politician William Egerton was recorded as the largest contributor to the land tax, paying over a third, and by 1844, William's eldest son and heir Wilbraham Egerton owned about half of the land in Burnage.

In 1894, the Irish writer George Bernard Shaw described Burnage as the prettiest village in Manchester. Burnage had an established cottage industry in hand weaving. Many of the original weavers' cottages survive today.

=== 20th century ===
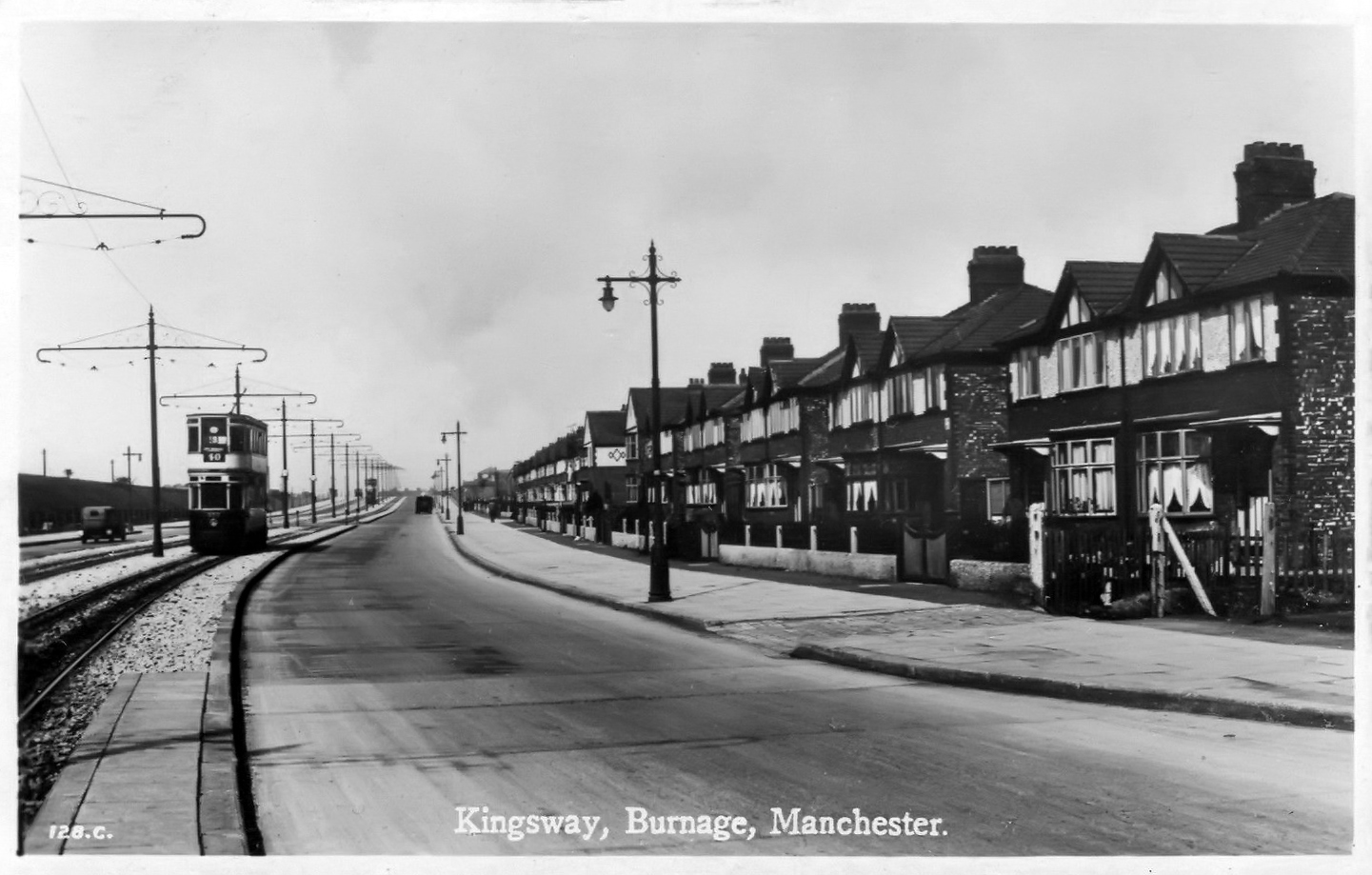
A tram running along Kingsway, c.1930

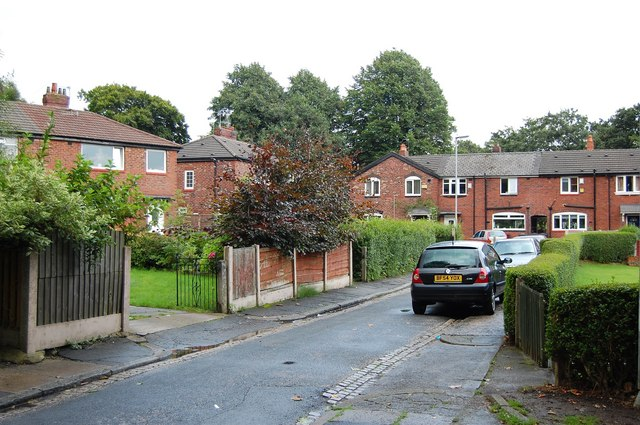
An example of council housing on Elmhurst Drive, Burnage

1906 saw plans to build a "garden suburb" in the district. Burnage Garden Village was created by building many new semi-detached houses as well as open recreational spaces, including lawns, gardens, a bowling green, tennis courts, allotments and a children's playground.

Hans Renold established an engineering works at Burnage from 1906 to manufacture roller chain. The factory closed during the late 1980s. The site lay abandoned for several years, but now has been developed and a Tesco supermarket and a development of flats and retail units sit on the site.

Construction of Kingsway (the A34) began in 1928. It was named after King George V and was originally numbered A5079. Like Princess Road further to the west, Kingsway was laid out as a dual carriageway for motor vehicles with a segregated tram track along the central reservation which allowed Manchester Corporation Tramways to run trams into Manchester City Centre.

A large housing estate was built by Manchester City Council along the Kingsway route, mostly characterised by brick semi-detached houses laid out in avenues and octagons. Today, only parts of Burnage Lane still survive as original weavers' cottages. A cinema, the Lido, was built in the 1920s on Kingsway. This was renamed the Odeon in the 1940s and then became the Classic in the 1960s, before finally becoming the Concorde cinema in the 1970s which then also included a bingo hall in the premises. The cinema closed in the early 1990s, and has since been demolished and a supermarket built on the site.

Mauldeth Hall in Green End was the dwelling of the Bishop of Manchester for more than 20 years, before his move to Higher Broughton.

Aviation

On 28 April 1910, French pilot Louis Paulhan landed his Farman biplane in Barcicroft Fields, Pytha Fold Farm, on the borders of Withington, Burnage and Didsbury. This completed the first ever powered flight from London to Manchester, with a short overnight stop at Lichfield, (195 miles/298 km), and he won a £10,000 prize offered by the Daily Mail, beating the British contender, Claude Grahame-White. Two special trains were chartered to Burnage railway station to take spectators to the landing, with other spectators waiting through the previous night. Paulhan was followed throughout by a train carrying his wife, Henri Farman and his supporting mechanics. Today, a blue plaque recording Paulhan's achievement is displayed on a house in Paulhan Road, which forms part of the site where he landed.

Babies' Hospital

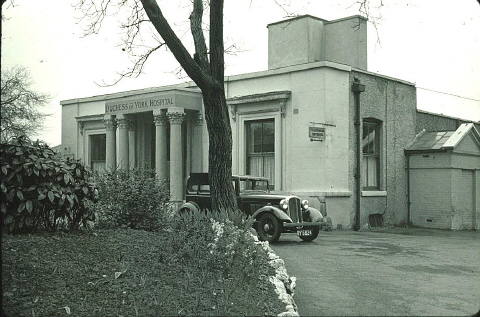
The Duchess of York Hospital for Babies in 1953

In 1919 the Manchester Babies Hospital moved to Cringle Hall in Burnage having previously been in Levenshulme and Chorlton-on-Medlock. It then had 50 beds; the number of patients increased from 82 in the first year to 430 in 1929. After the building of a new pavilion on the open-air principle with glass wards specially designed for the treatment of rickets in 1925 the number of cots rose to 80. In 1935 a new hospital wing with much improved surgical facilities was opened by the Duchess of York in June 1935. The name of the hospital was changed to the Duchess of York Hospital for Babies. Until the creation of the National health Service in 1948 the hospital was supported by the Corporation of Manchester and by voluntary contributions. It closed in 1986 and a new Duchess of York ward was then opened in Withington Hospital.

=== Present day ===
Burnage is a mainly residential area, mostly semi-detached houses built in the 1930s and 1940s.

== Geography ==
Burnage is a suburb of South Manchester, approximately 4.2 miles (6.8 km) from Manchester City Centre

== Governance ==
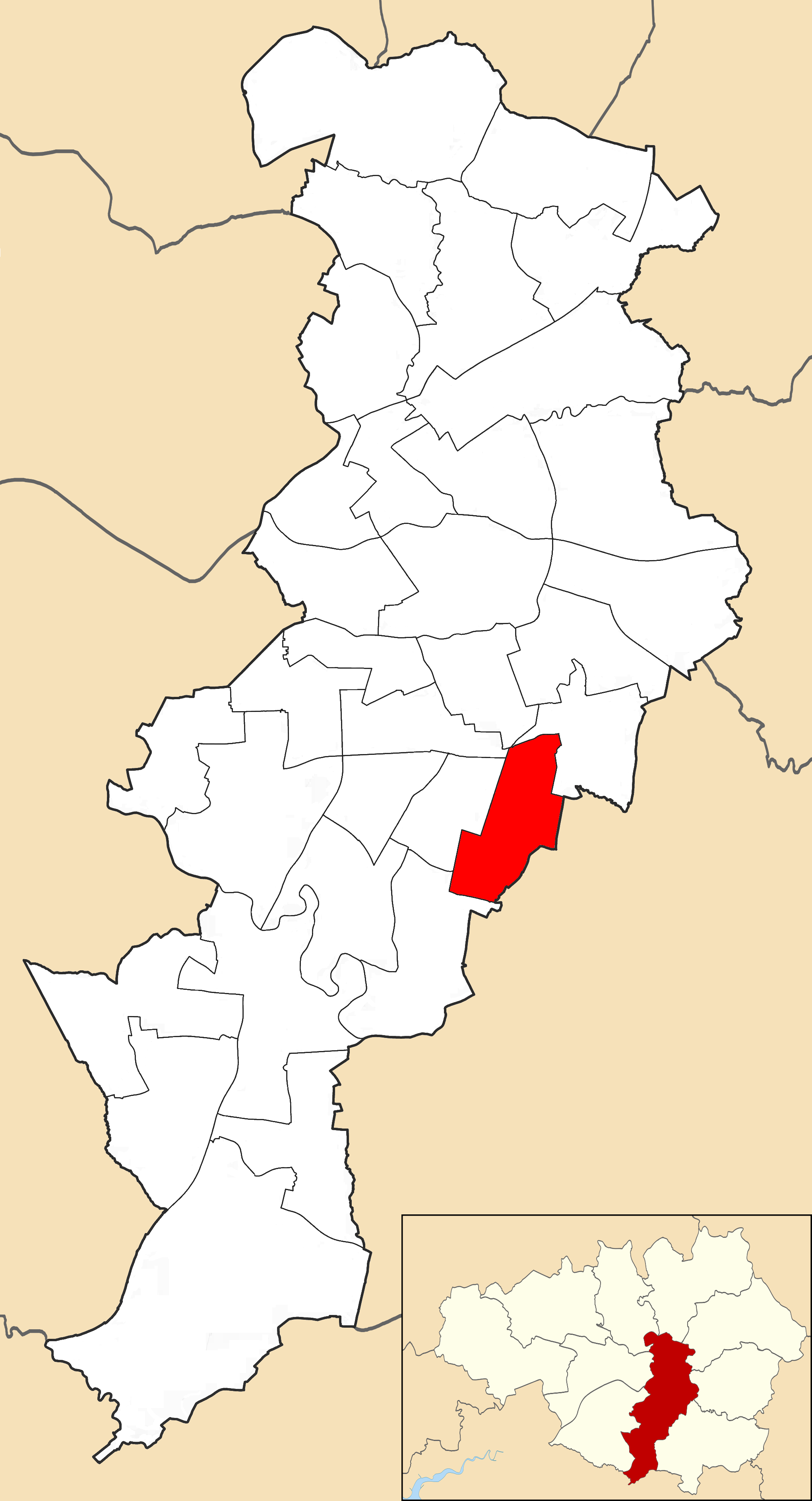
The Burnage electoral ward within the City of Manchester

=== Civic history ===
Burnage was a township in the ancient parish of Manchester in the Salford hundred of Lancashire (historic boundaries). In the early 13th century it lay within the Manor of Withington, a feudal estate which also encompassed the townships of Withington, Didsbury, Chorlton-cum-Hardy, Moss Side, Rusholme, Denton and Haughton, ruled by the Hathersage, Longford, Mosley and Tatton families. Burnage remained under the manor of Withington for several centuries.

Burnage was in Chorlton Poor Law Union (together with most of south Manchester but named after Chorlton-on-Medlock) from 1837 to 1915, and in Manchester Poor Law Union from 1915 to 1930. In 1866 Burnage became a separate civil parish, in 1876 it was included in the area of Withington Local Board of Health. Under the Divided Parishes Act 1882 there was an exchange of areas with Withington township and part of Didsbury township was added to Burnage township. In 1894 it became part of Withington Urban District in the administrative county of Lancashire.

In 1904 it became part of the County Borough of Manchester, on 1 October 1910 the parish was abolished and merged with South Manchester. In 1901 the parish had a population of 1892. In 1974 it became part of the metropolitan borough of Manchester within the metropolitan county of Greater Manchester.

=== Political representation ===
The current city councillors for the ward are Azra Ali (Labour), Ben Clay (Labour) and Bev Craig (Labour).

Burnage is in the parliamentary constituency of Gorton and Denton, currently represented by Hannah Spencer MP (Green Party).

== Public services ==
=== Schools ===
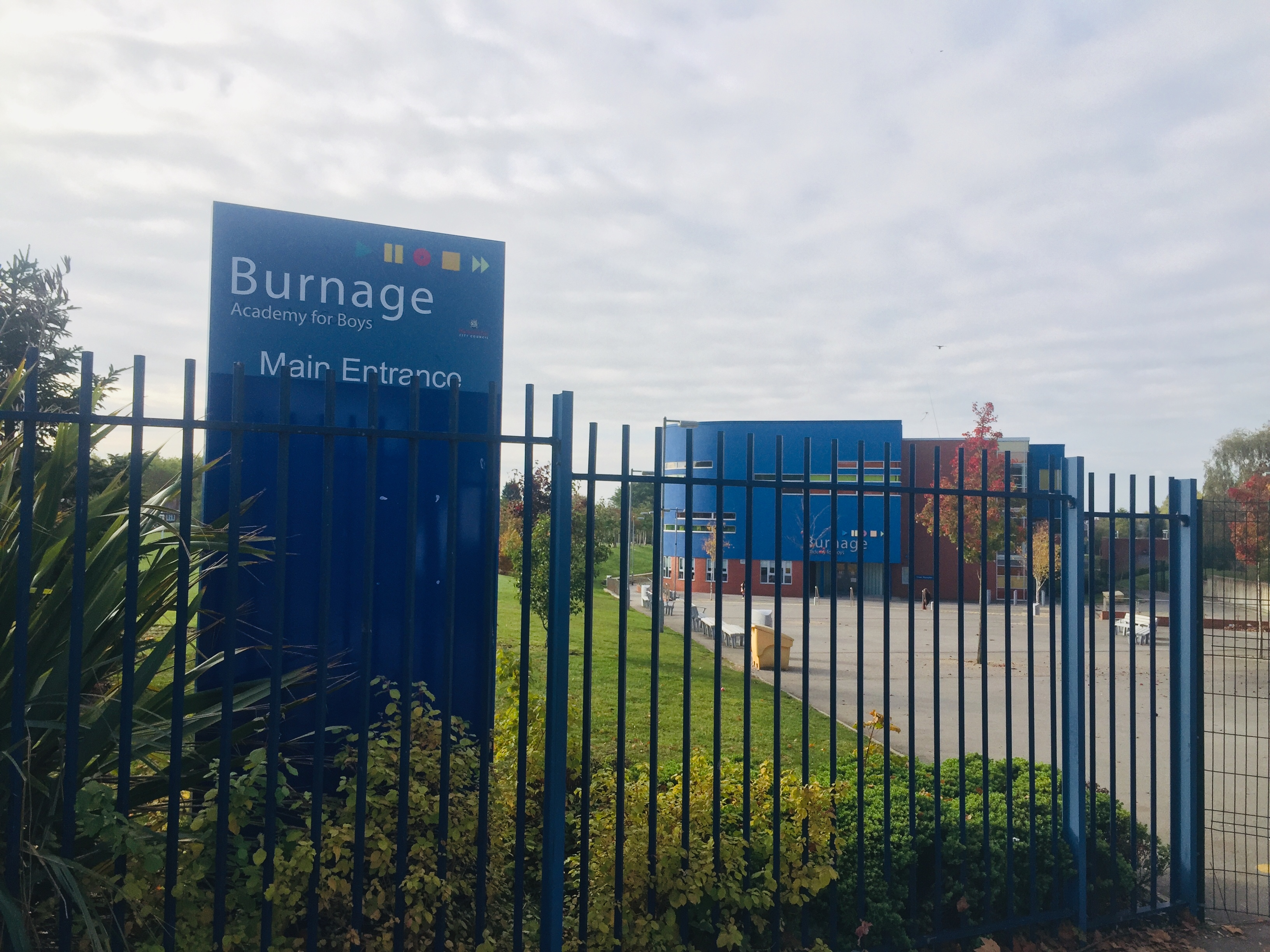
Burnage Academy on Burnage Lane

Burnage is home to three primary schools and one secondary. Acacias Primary School, Green End Primary School and St Bernard's RC Primary School cater for younger students. Burnage Academy for Boys (previously named Burnage High School) is a former grammar school and Media Arts College which converted to an academy in 2014. Green End Primary School was rebuilt in 2006 and converted to academy status in 2013. Nearest schools, include Levenshulme High School and MEA Central.

=== Police ===
Burnage is covered by the South Manchester division of Greater Manchester Police.

== Transport ==
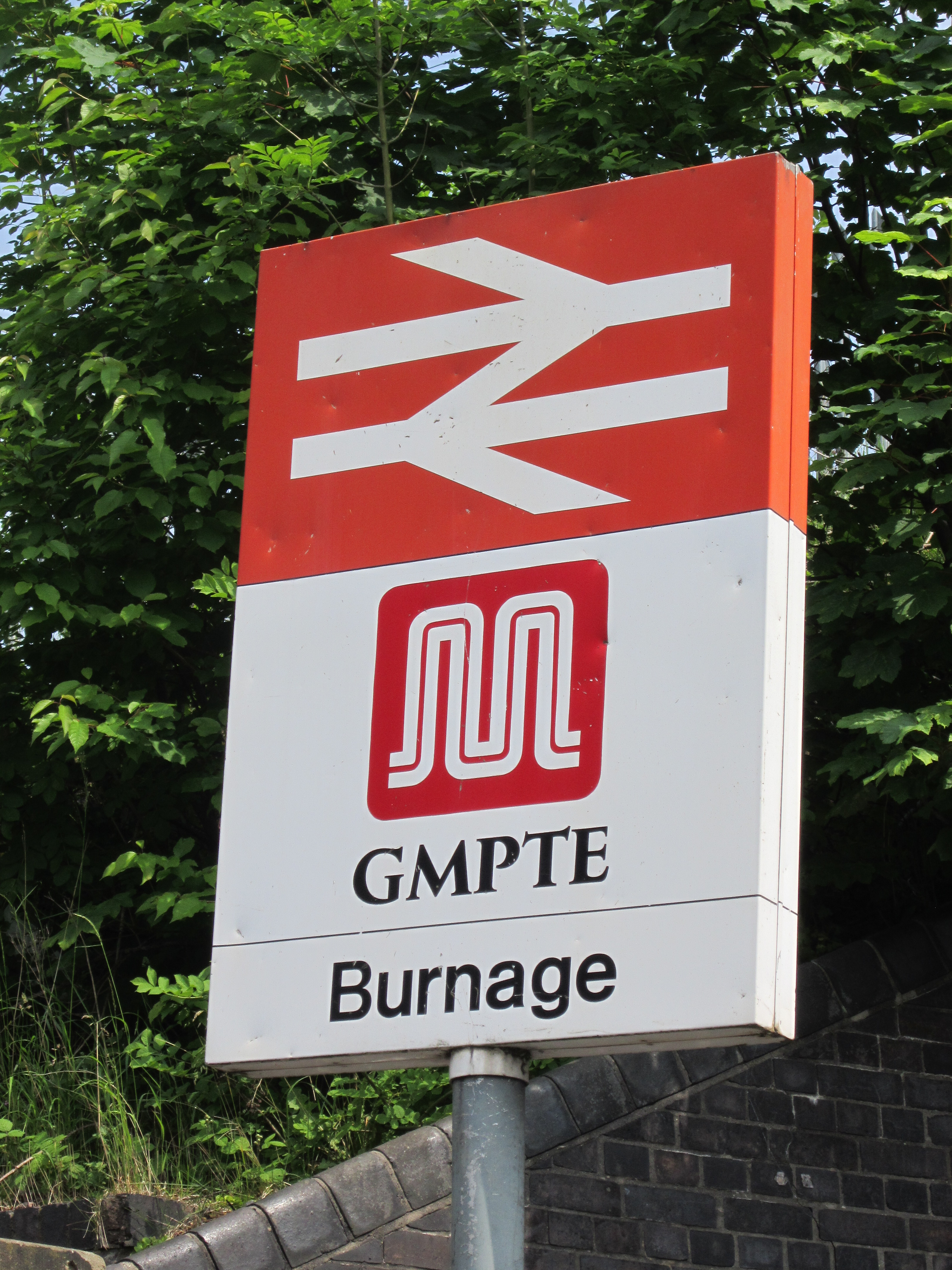
Burnage railway station

Burnage is served by two railway stations: Burnage railway station, which is located on Fog Lane, and Mauldeth Road, which is to the north of the area and also serves Ladybarn. Both stations are on the Styal Line, a suburban railway line that provides local services between Manchester Piccadilly and Crewe, with peak-hour trains to Manchester Airport. Journey time from Burnage to Piccadilly is approximately 12 minutes. Interchange with the Manchester Metrolink tram system is available one stop south at East Didsbury (which is close to with East Didsbury tram stop).

Bus 25 runs between Stockport and the Trafford Centre, via Burnage, Chorlton-cum-Hardy and Stretford.

Burnage is close to junction 5 of Manchester's ring road, the M60 motorway. Manchester Airport, the busiest airport in the UK outside London, is about 5 miles (8.0 km) to the south.

== Notable people ==
Writer Frances Hodgson Burnett, who wrote Little Lord Fauntleroy, spent most of her early childhood in Burnage. Actors David Threlfall and Max Beesley are from Burnage. Martin Lings, a renowned Islamic philosopher and Shakespearean scholar, was also born in Burnage.

The trade unionist and former Lord Mayor of Manchester Wright Robinson moved to Burnage with his wife Frances Robinson in the 1930s. Frances was an active member of the Burnage Community Association

The district is notable for being the childhood home of Liam and Noel Gallagher (Oasis), who attended St Bernard's RC Primary School on Burnage Lane and St Mark's RC High School (now The Barlow Roman Catholic High School) on Parrs Wood Road. Lead singer and bassist of the 1960s and 1970s pop band the Fortunes, Eddie Mooney has lived in Burnage for many years.

Alumni of Burnage High School (including the old Burnage Grammar School) include Manchester United and England footballers Roger Byrne, who captained United's "Busby Babes" and was one of the victims of the 1958 Munich air disaster, and Wes Brown; as well as Norman Foster, Baron Foster of Thames Bank, noted international architect.

Dave Rowbotham, former guitarist of local post-punk groups Durutti Column, The Invisible Girls and The Mothmen, lived there in a flat until November 1991, when his dead body was found, having been killed by an axe murderer.

Controversial speaker Asif Hussain Farooqui was previously based at a mosque in Burnage.

== See also ==
- Listed buildings in Manchester-M19
- Burnage Academy for Boys
