= Mauldeth Road railway station =

Railway station in Greater Manchester, England

Coordinates: 53°26′02″N 2°12′31.50″W

Mauldeth Road
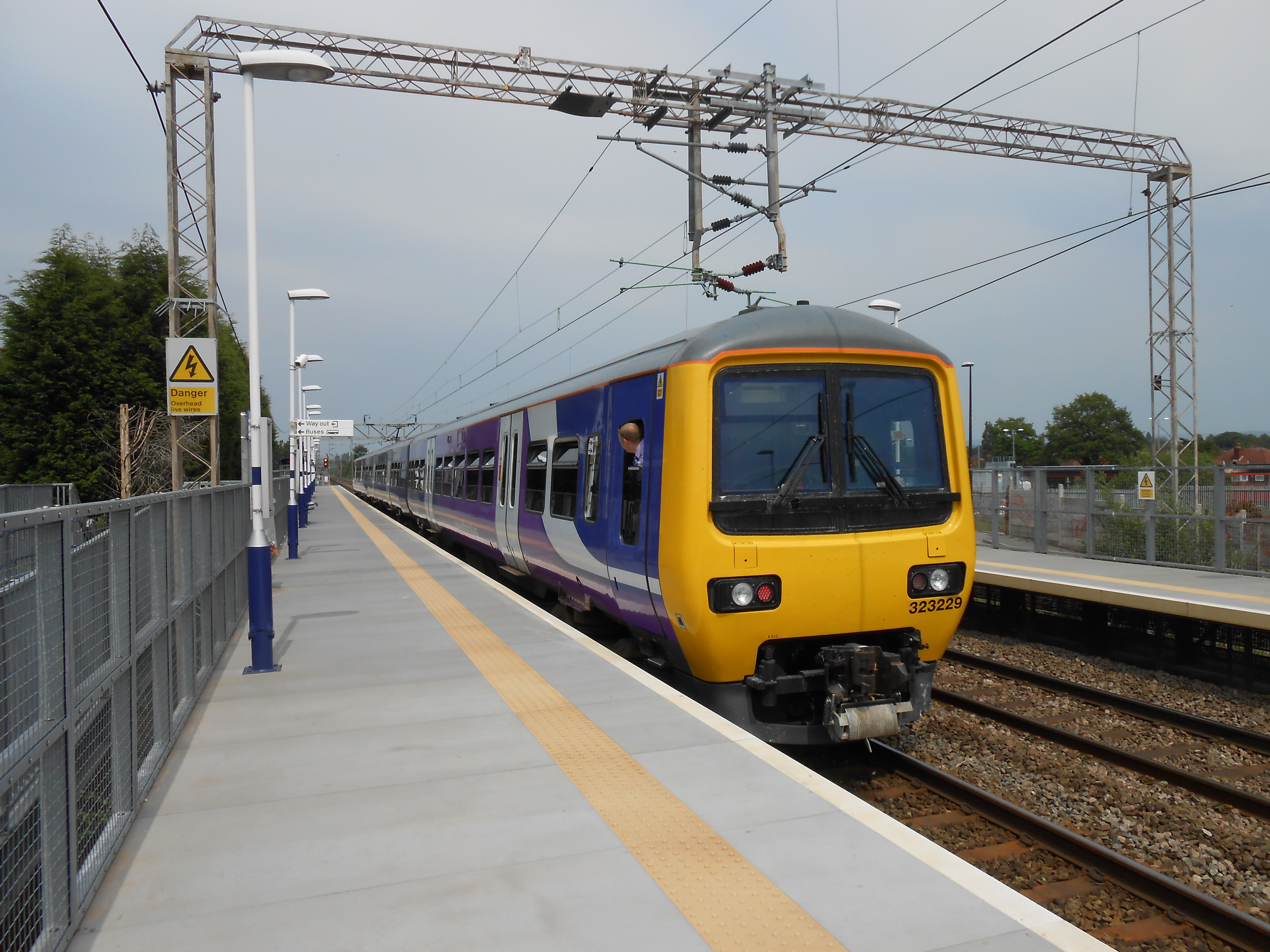
- A Northern Rail Class 323 EMU departing from the station to Manchester Piccadilly in 2013

General information
- Location: Ladybarn, Manchester; England
- Grid reference: SJ862931
- Manager: Northern Trains
- Transit authority: Transport for Greater Manchester
- Platforms: 2

Other information
- Station code: MAU
- Classification: DfT category D

History
- Opened: 1909 as Mauldeth Road for Withington

Key dates
- 1959: Electrified
- 1974: Renamed Mauldeth Road
- 2007: Refurbished
- 2023: Platforms extended

Passengers
- 2021/22: ▲0.203 million
- 2022/23: ▼0.192 million
- 2023/24: ▲0.303 million
- 2024/25: ▲0.318 million
- 2025/26: ▲0.336 million
Location
Notes
- Passenger statistics from the Office of Rail and Road

Mauldeth Road railway station (known as Mauldeth Road for Withington until 1974) serves the Ladybarn area of south Manchester, England. It is the first stop after Manchester Piccadilly on the Styal Line to Manchester Airport and Wilmslow, one of the most congested lines on the National Rail network; it was electrified in 1959.

== History ==
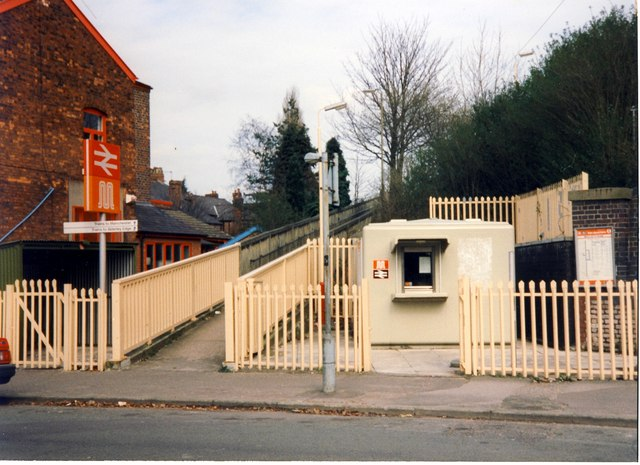
Mauldeth Road station entrance in 1989

The station opened in 1909, sited south of Longsight (Slade Lane Junction), as Mauldeth Road for Withington; it was renamed Mauldeth Road on 6 May 1974. Its coal sidings closed in the 1960s, along with its original platform buildings on the 'up' (southbound) side.

The remaining wooden ticket office, on the 'down' platform, burned down on Bonfire Night in 1986; thereafter, the ticket office was a small prefabricated unit at the bottom of the station approach.

It caters mainly for commuter traffic and is used primarily by EMU traffic. Some evening services are operated by TransPennine Express with DMUs.

=== 2006 redevelopment ===
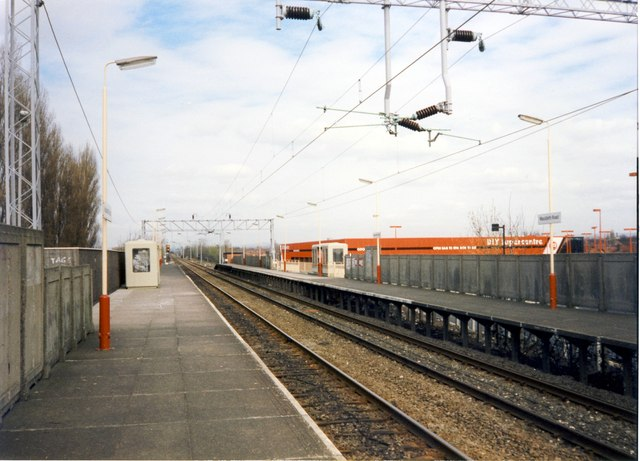
Mauldeth Road in 1989, with concrete platforms from the 1960s

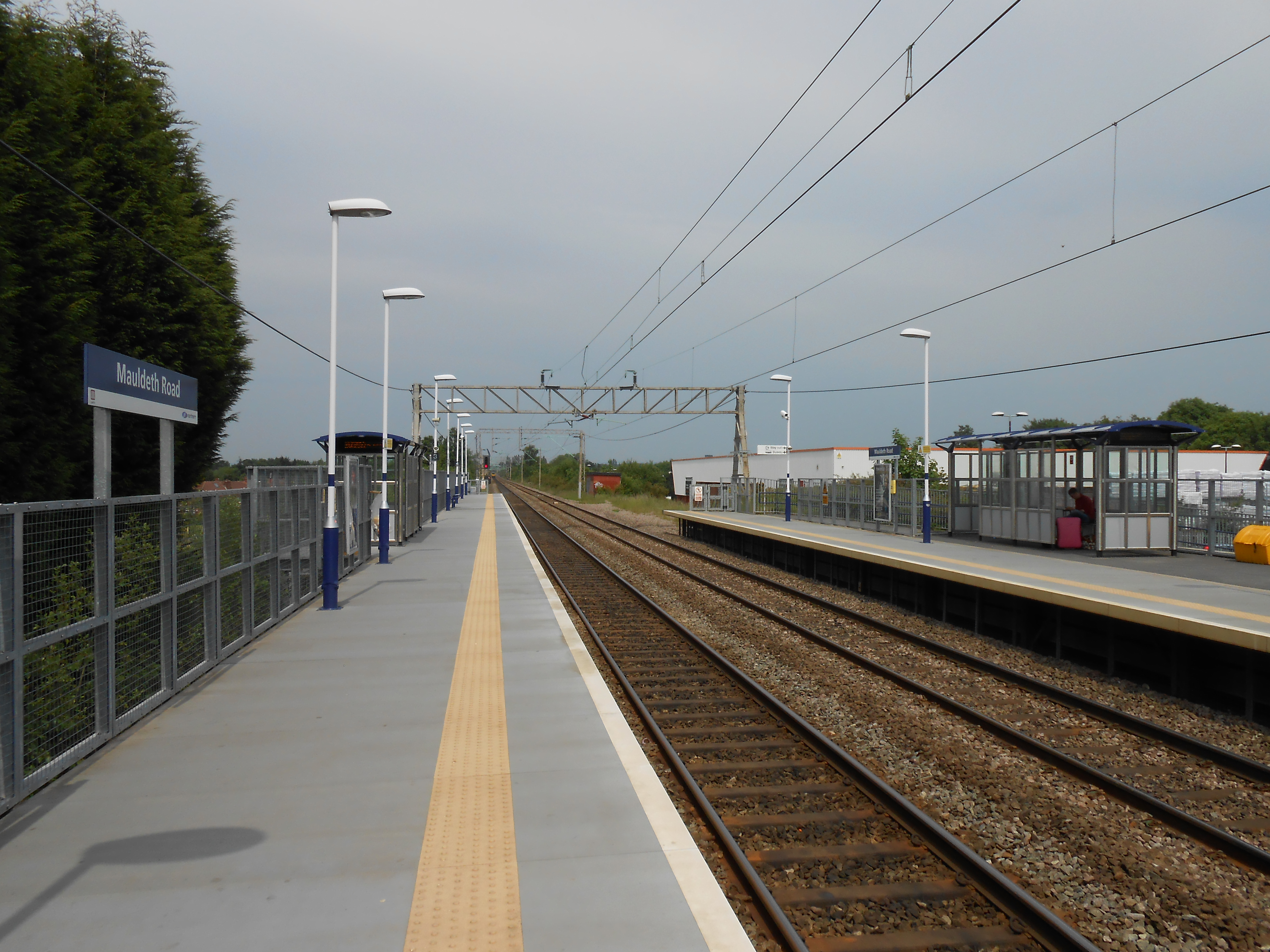
The station was modernised in 2006, with new steel platforms and shelters

As part of a £12 million station modernisation programme on the Manchester Airport Line, rebuilding work on Mauldeth Road station commenced in autumn 2006. Network Rail were able to keep the station operational for most of the time by demolishing the existing platforms in small parts and using temporary platforms. There was a temporary footbridge spanning the platforms while the pedestrians' access ramp to the northbound platform was out of use during renovation; the footbridge offered a vantage point for views over Manchester. As part of the rebuilding work, new steel platforms, modern waiting shelters, new lighting and access ramps were constructed; the work was completed by June 2007.

=== Recent developments ===
Following extensive redevelopment of the station in 2006, passenger numbers doubled from approximately 148,000 to 323,000 in the five years between 2007 and 2012.

The portakabin ticket office, used since the late 1980s, was closed and removed in April 2013. A new purpose-built ticket office, funded by Network Rail, was constructed in summer 2013 and was opened in October 2013.

In March 2017, the old railway bridge over Mauldeth Road, dating from when the line opened in 1909, had become life-expired and was replaced.

=== Service patterns ===
Historically, the station has been served by a half-hourly service each way to Manchester Piccadilly and Crewe. In 1993, following the opening of the railway station at Manchester Airport, every other service terminated and commenced at Manchester Airport while another continued on to either Wilmslow, Alderley Edge or Crewe.

The new 2018 timetable was the most radical in decades and was notable for its poor introduction, which was marked by many delays and cancellations. As part of the May 2018 timetable change, the Styal Line to the Airport operated on a skip-stop basis to free up additional capacity for express trains. Consequently, Mauldeth Road station was still served by two trains per hour in each direction, but at more irregular intervals. Not all services stopped at the four other commuter stations on the Styal Line (Burnage, East Didsbury, Gatley and Heald Green), as has been the case historically. Additionally, services were extended to Liverpool Lime Street, which allowed for the service to utilise the two through platforms (13 and 14) at Piccadilly rather than terminating into a bay platform; this prevented the services from cutting across the throat of the approach into Piccadilly and reducing capacity for Transpennine services.

Due to train crew shortages, between January and December 2022, the service was reduced to an hourly service with the semi-fast service between Manchester Airport and Liverpool Lime Street, via Warrington Central, being withdrawn. Following a sustained fall in patronage between 2017 and 2021, attributed to the introduction of irregular calling patterns and increased unreliability following the 2018 timetable recast, in Mauldeth Road reverted to a service similar to pre-2018 timetable December 2022, with an even half-hourly service.

The southbound platform was upgraded in early 2023. Six-car Classes 195 and 331 can call at Mauldeth Road, due to automatic selective door operation (ASDO); however, the southbound platform extension will allow two Class 323 units (which do not possess ASDO) to call at Mauldeth Road and double seating capacity on the service.

== Facilities ==
The station has the following facilities:

- A staffed ticket office on the ramp up to platform 1 (for trains towards Manchester Piccadilly)
- A ticket machine, situated adjacent to the ticket office
- Step-free access to both platforms
- A station car park next to platform 2.

== Services ==
=== Present ===
The current Monday-Saturday service pattern consists of stopping services on two routes:

- 1 train per hour each way between Crewe and Manchester Piccadilly, via Manchester Airport
- 1 train per hour each way between Liverpool Lime Street and Manchester Airport, via Manchester Piccadilly and Newton-le-Willows.

On Sundays, there is an hourly stopping service each way between Liverpool Lime Street and Wilmslow.

All stopping services are operated by Northern Trains.

Preceding station	National Rail	Following station
Burnage	Northern Trains Manchester Airport to Liverpool Lime Street	Manchester Piccadilly
Burnage	Northern Trains Styal line local stopping service Monday to Saturday	Manchester Piccadilly

=== Historical ===
==== May 1993 - May 2018 ====
Since the opening of Manchester Airport station in May 1993, the Monday to Saturday service pattern was two trains per hour to Manchester Piccadilly; two trains per hour operated in the opposite direction: one to Manchester Airport and the other continued onto Crewe until 17:53, then terminated at Wilmslow in the evening.

Sunday services consisted of one train per hour to Manchester Airport (with alternate trains continuing to Alderley Edge) and one train per hour to Manchester Piccadilly.

==== May 2018 - December 2021 ====
The service pattern was amended to increase capacity on the line, with several services not stopping at the other intermediate stations towards Manchester Airport.

The Monday to Saturday service pattern consisted of

- 1 train per hour to Crewe, via Manchester Airport, stopping at most local stations; operated by a Class 319 or Class 323;
- 1 train per hour to Manchester Airport running semi-fast- operated by a Class 195;
- 1 train per hour to Liverpool Lime Street, via Manchester Piccadilly and Newton-le-Willows, stopping at all local stations; operated by a Class 319 or 323
- 1 train per hour to Liverpool Lime Street, via Manchester Piccadilly and Warrington Central, running semi-fast; operated by a Class 195
- 3 trains in the morning to Blackpool North, via Chorley; operated by a Class 331
- 1 train per day to Cleethorpes, operated by TransPennine Express with a Class 185.

The Sunday service consisted of:

- 1 train per hour to Liverpool Lime Street; operated by a Class 319 or Class 323
- 1 train per hour to Wilmslow; operated by a Class 319 or 323.
