= Burnage railway station =

Railway station in Greater Manchester, England

Coordinates: 53°25′19″N 2°12′55″W

Burnage
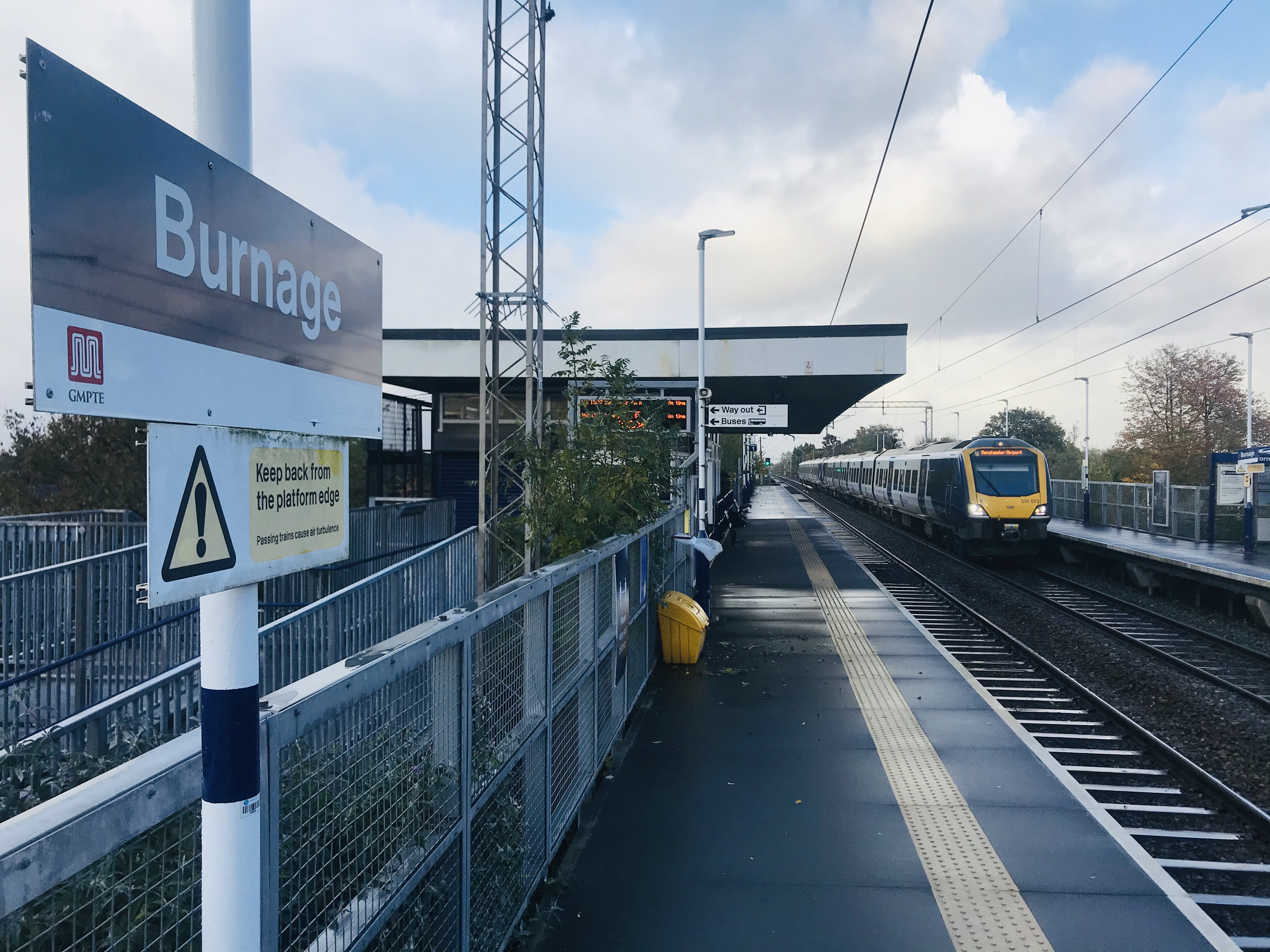

General information
- Location: Burnage, Manchester; England
- Grid reference: SJ857917
- Managed by: Northern Trains
- Transit authority: Greater Manchester
- Platforms: 2

Other information
- Station code: BNA
- Classification: DfT category E

History
- Opened: 1910

Key dates
- 1958: Reconstructed
- 2007: Reconstruction of platforms

Passengers
- 2020/21: ▼37,962
- 2021/22: ▲0.135 million
- 2022/23: ▲0.142 million
- 2023/24: ▲0.160 million
- 2024/25: ▲0.172 million
Notes
- Passenger statistics from the Office of Rail and Road

Burnage railway station serves the suburb of Burnage in south Manchester, England. It is a stop on the Styal Line between Manchester Piccadilly, Manchester Airport and Wilmslow. It caters mainly for commuter traffic, with regular services between Crewe, Manchester Airport and Manchester Piccadilly.

== History ==
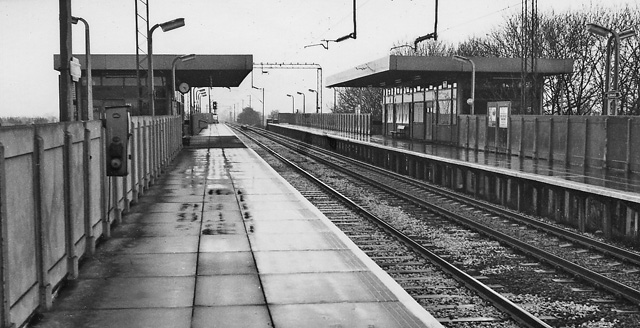
The view northwards towards Manchester London Road in 1965

The station was opened in 1910.

The line was electrified at 25 kV AC overhead in 1959, during the modernisation of the line as part of the wider West Coast Main Line electrification programme.

From May 2018, services operated on a 'skip-stop' basis at irregular intervals to increase capacity on the line. As a designated Northern Connect stop, a direct express service to Blackpool North, via Chorley, was introduced as part of this timetable change. This was replaced by calls on services between Windermere/Barrow-in-Furness and Manchester Airport running via Wigan North Western as part of the December 2019 timetable change.

== Facilities ==
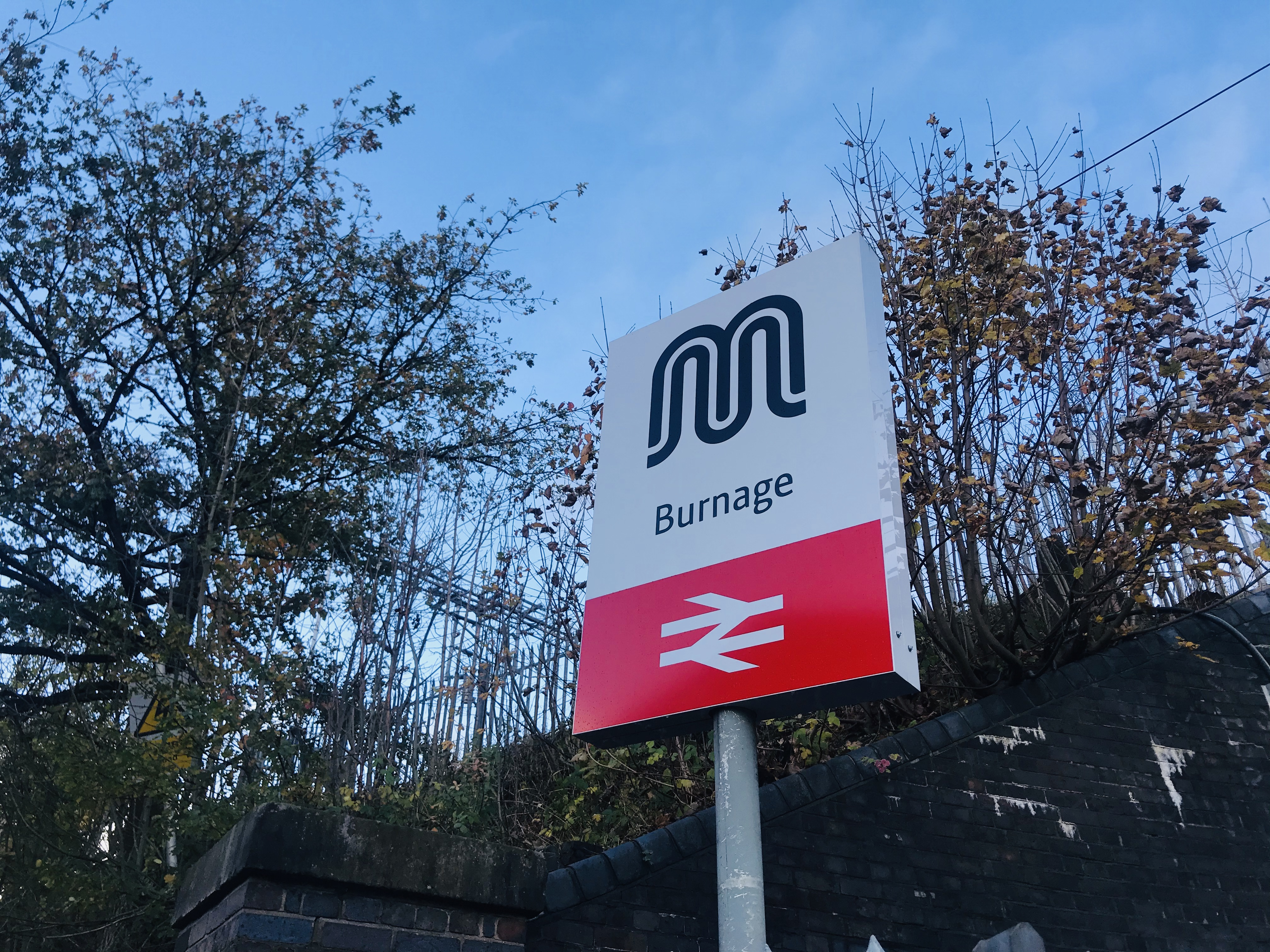
The entrance to Burnage station

The station has the following facilities:

- A staffed ticket office, open on Monday to Friday (06:30-13:00) and Saturday (07:00-14:00)
- A ticket machine

== Services ==
Northern Trains runs hourly services each way between Liverpool Lime Street and Manchester Airport, and between Manchester Piccadilly and Crewe. On Sundays, the stopping service runs hourly between Liverpool Lime Street and Wilmslow.

Preceding station	National Rail	Following station
East Didsbury	Northern Trains Styal Line	Mauldeth Road
East Didsbury	Northern Trains local stopping service Monday to Saturday	Mauldeth Road
