= Styal line =

Railway line in Greater Manchester and Cheshire, England

Styal line Airport line
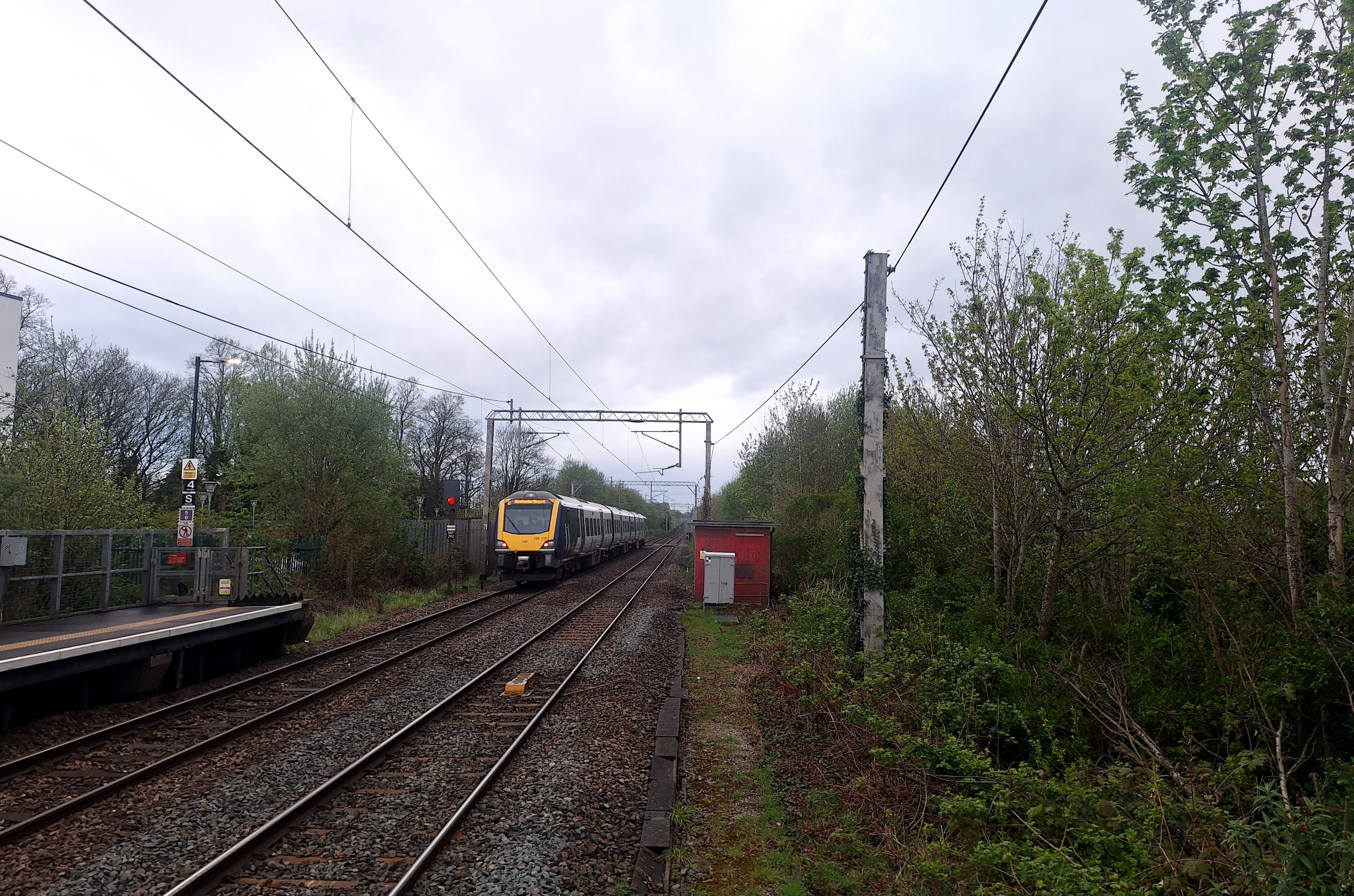
- A Northern Class 195 passing East Didsbury in April 2025

Overview
- Status: Operational
- Owner: Network Rail
- Locale: Greater Manchester; Cheshire; North West England
- Termini: Manchester Piccadilly; Wilmslow
- Stations: 9

Service
- System: National Rail
- Rolling stock: Primarily: Class 185; Class 195; Class 197; Class 323; Class 331; Class 397
- Ridership: 7.4 million per year

History
- Opened: 1909

Technical
- Track gauge: 1,435 mm (4 ft 8 1/2 in) standard gauge
- Electrification: 25 kV AC overhead
- Operating speed: 70 mph speed restriction
Route map
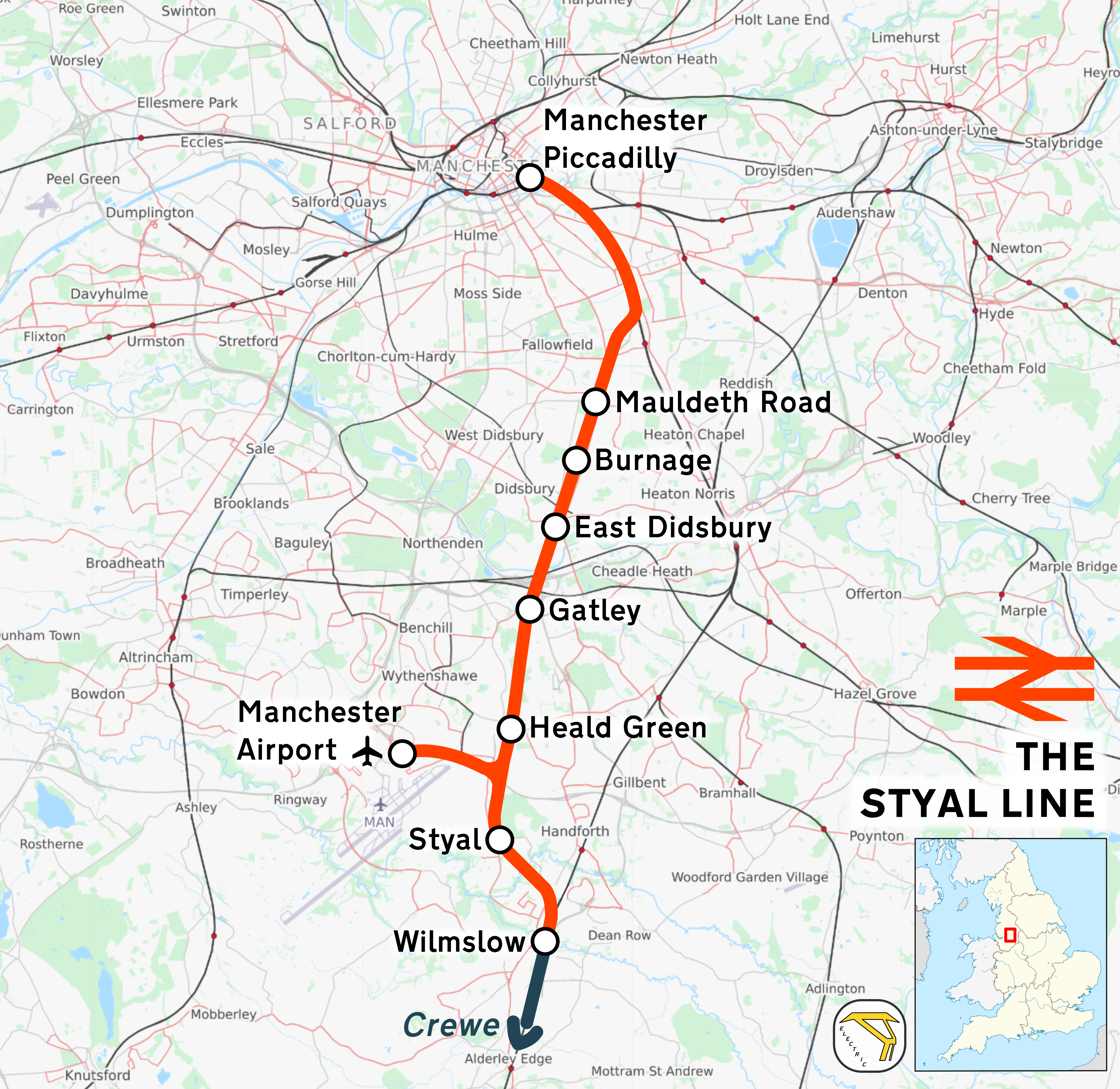
(Click to expand)

The Styal line is a suburban commuter railway line which runs through south Manchester, England; it commences at Slade Lane Junction, 1.2 miles (1.9 km) south of Manchester Piccadilly, and ends 12 miles (19 km) south at Wilmslow.

Opened in 1909, by the London and North Western Railway company, it takes its name from the Cheshire station of Styal, the last stop before the junction at Wilmslow. A branch line to Manchester Airport was built in 1993, accessed via a triangular junction between Heald Green and Styal; it is also referred to as the Airport line.

Journeys into Manchester on the line have risen sharply since the 1990s and the opening of Manchester Airport station in 1993 fuelled an increase in express services from Northern England and beyond. As a result, it is now one of the most congested lines on the National Rail network, with services frequently susceptible to delays and cancellations.

Between May 2018 and December 2022, the line operated on a skip-stop basis, with each station having a dedicated express service to Liverpool Lime Street, Preston, Blackpool North and Windermere. This was to maximise the number of train slots between Manchester Piccadilly and Manchester Airport; however, because of poor performance and falling passenger numbers, the service reverted to half-hourly calling at all stations in December 2022, with one service running between Crewe and Manchester Piccadilly and the other running between Manchester Airport and Liverpool Lime Street. The three busiest stations (Heald Green, Gatley and East Didsbury) retain a third hourly express service in addition to the stopping services. As only one train per hour runs between Manchester Airport and Wilmslow, Styal station is served hourly.

== History ==
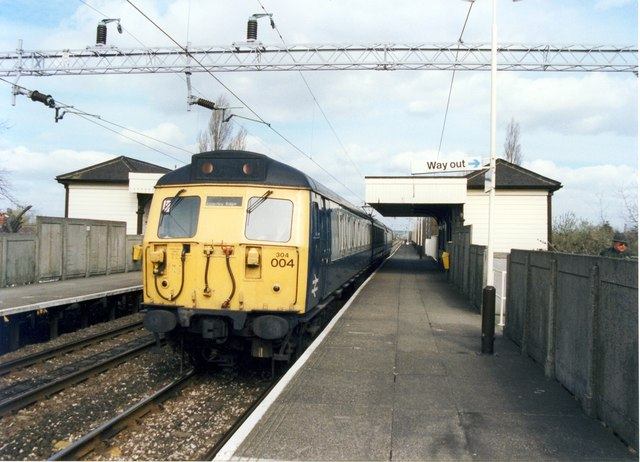
When operated by British Rail, the line was served by Class 304 electric multiple units

In the early twentieth century, the line between Manchester London Road (now called Piccadilly station) and Stockport became unable to cope with the increasing traffic. To solve the problem, a new route avoiding Stockport was constructed by the London and North Western Railway; it ran from Slade Lane Junction, located in Longsight, to Wilmslow through what was then mainly a rural area. The primary purpose was to provide a bypass for express trains, but a few wooden stations were built on the line to encourage suburban development. In practice, very few expresses latterly used the line, as it was necessary for most trains to serve the important station at Stockport. The line opened in 1909 and, from 1923, was operated by the London Midland and Scottish Railway.

In the 1950s, as part of British Rail's Modernisation Plan, the British Transport Commission identified the Styal line as a suitable test track to prove its new electrification scheme; the line was electrified in 1959. Some of the stations were rebuilt using the Mod-X system at this time. Following the Styal line tests, it was decided to adopt the 25 kV system across the electrified Great Britain rail network, outside the Southern Region. There was a half-hourly electric service (Monday - Saturday) between Manchester Oxford Road and Alderley Edge, operated by Class 304 EMUs. Services were extended to Altrincham when the MSJAR was re-electrified at 25 kV AC in 1971 and operated in this way until the line between Altrincham and Manchester was transferred to Manchester Metrolink in 1990.

In the 1970s, the Styal line was included in a proposal to create an underground railway across Manchester City Centre. The Picc-Vic tunnel was planned to connect the two major mainline railway termini, Manchester Piccadilly and Manchester Victoria; it would have enabled Styal line trains to run directly across the city to Bolton and Bury. The Picc-Vic scheme was abandoned in 1977, because of funding difficulties.

In 1993, a short spur line to Manchester Airport was opened, branching away the Styal line between Heald Green and Styal. Initially, services ran via Heald Green only, until a triangular junction was added a few years later which provided a link towards Styal. Many services were then diesel powered until 2014. The introduction of Class 350s by First TransPennine Express on the Edinburgh-Manchester Airport line in December 2013 and Class 319s by Northern Rail in early 2015 curtailed the use of diesel trains on the line; this allowed for a 100 mph service compared with 75 mph limit for many diesel trains, such as the Class 156 and the now-retired Class 142 Pacer trains.

In 2006, the platforms at Mauldeth Road, Burnage, East Didsbury and Gatley stations were all reconstructed, as well as access improvements at Heald Green; patronage on the line increased after this investment. At the time, most platforms were future-proofed and extended to allow six carriage operation; however, it was not until 2019, with the arrival of the Class 195 and Class 331 units, that this platform capacity was fully utilised on Northern routes to Liverpool (Mauldeth Road) and Blackpool North (Burnage, East Didsbury and Gatley) which operate with six coaches.

In recent years, usage of the line has surged with growing commuter patronage, along with non-stopping services which use the line between Manchester Piccadilly and Manchester Airport. Nowadays, most services on the line operate via the airport. There are a couple of services each day (mainly long-distance trains) which take the direct route from Styal to Heald Green; that is to say, from Heald Green South Junction to Heald Green North Junction, for train crew route knowledge retention purposes northbound. However, the only services on the junction southbound are either freight or a Transport for Wales service which doesn't stop at either station and only operates on Sundays. This route can also be used for diversions if the Stockport route is closed for engineering work or blocked by an operational incident.

== Stations ==
Styal line stations (with 5 year patronage statistics)
Station	Image	Location	National services	Annual entry/exit (millions) 1997/98	Annual entry/exit 1999/00	Annual entry/exit 2004/05	Annual entry/exit 2009/10	Annual entry/exit 2014/15	Annual entry/exit 2019/20
Mauldeth Road		Ladybarn	Northern Trains	87,054	▼82,723	▲118,566	▲239,796	▲321,878	▼305,762
Burnage		Burnage	Northern Trains	71,774	▼70,803	▲92,908	▲158,674	▲186,778	▲213,780
East Didsbury		Didsbury	Northern Trains; Transport for Wales	87,893	▼86,832	▲124,511	▲272,656	▼254,256	▲296,966
Gatley		Gatley	Northern Trains; TransPennine Express	121,459	▲130,086	▲151,681	▲238,096	▲309,926	▼338,506
Heald Green		Heald Green	Northern Trains	191,537	▲204,190	▲245,950	▲379,956	▲497,988	▼482,318
Manchester Airport		Ringway	Northern Trains; TransPennine Express; Transport for Wales	1,132,740	▲1,259,513	▲1,576,260	▲2,620,252	▲3,460,854	▲5,747,000
Styal		Styal	Northern Trains	679	▲1,332	▲3,719	▼2,206	▲5,668	▼21,670
Total				1,693,136	▲1,835,479	▲2,313,595	▲3,911,609	▲5,037,348	▲7,406,002

== Services ==
=== Stopping services ===
All stations on the line are served by two stopping services per hour operated by Northern Trains: one runs between Liverpool Lime Street and Manchester Airport and the other runs between Manchester Piccadilly and Crewe. On Sundays, this is reduced to one train per hour which runs between Liverpool Lime Street and Wilmslow. These services are usually operated by a Class 323 electric multiple unit (EMU).

The busier stations (East Didsbury, Gatley and Heald Green) are served by an additional third express train every hour. Early morning, late evening and peak services sometimes make additional stops to provide additional services; for example, Gatley is served by a Blackpool North train at 07:43 on Sunday mornings.

Mauldeth Road, Burnage and Heald Green are served exclusively by Northern Trains.

East Didsbury is also served by Transport for Wales Rail and Gatley is also served by TransPennine Express services.

Styal line off-peak services (as of December 2021)
Station	tph	Stopping service	Express service	Additional express service
Mauldeth Road	2	Half hourly 'stopping' service Crewe to Manchester Piccadilly; Manchester Airport to Liverpool Lime Street calling at all stations on the Styal line		
Burnage	2	Half hourly 'stopping' service Crewe to Manchester Piccadilly; Manchester Airport to Liverpool Lime Street calling at all stations on the Styal line		
East Didsbury	3	Half hourly 'stopping' service Crewe to Manchester Piccadilly; Manchester Airport to Liverpool Lime Street calling at all stations on the Styal line	Manchester Airport to Llandudno (Transport for Wales)	Manchester Airport to Barrow-in-Furness/Windermere
Gatley	3	Half hourly 'stopping' service Crewe to Manchester Piccadilly; Manchester Airport to Liverpool Lime Street calling at all stations on the Styal line	Manchester Airport to Barrow-in-Furness/Windermere	Manchester Airport to Saltburn (TransPennine Express)
Heald Green	3	Half hourly 'stopping' service Crewe to Manchester Piccadilly; Manchester Airport to Liverpool Lime Street calling at all stations on the Styal line	Manchester Airport to Blackpool North	Manchester Airport to Barrow-in-Furness/Windermere
Manchester Airport	7	Half hourly 'stopping' service Crewe to Manchester Piccadilly; Manchester Airport to Liverpool Lime Street calling at all stations on the Styal line	to Barrow-in-Furness, Blackpool North and Llandudno	to Redcar Central, Edinburgh and Glasgow Central
Styal	1	Half hourly 'stopping' service Crewe to Manchester Piccadilly; Manchester Airport to Liverpool Lime Street calling at all stations on the Styal line		

=== Express services ===
TransPennine Express run through services, via Manchester Piccadilly, from across the north of England; these include to Redcar Central, via Leeds and York, operated by Class 185s. Their trains also operate from Glasgow Central/Edinburgh Waverley (both two-hourly) via Preston and Manchester Piccadilly. These were operated by Class 185 diesel multiple units until December 2013, when they were replaced with Class 350 EMUs. which were transferred to London Northwestern Railway in 2020, following replacement by Class 397 EMUs.

Transport for Wales Rail run an hourly service between the Airport and Llandudno via Chester, using Class 197 units.

== See also ==
- Airport Line (Manchester Metrolink); Metrolink tram line also serving Manchester Airport.
