= Chorlton Poor Law Union =

Coordinates: 53.44°N 2.28°W

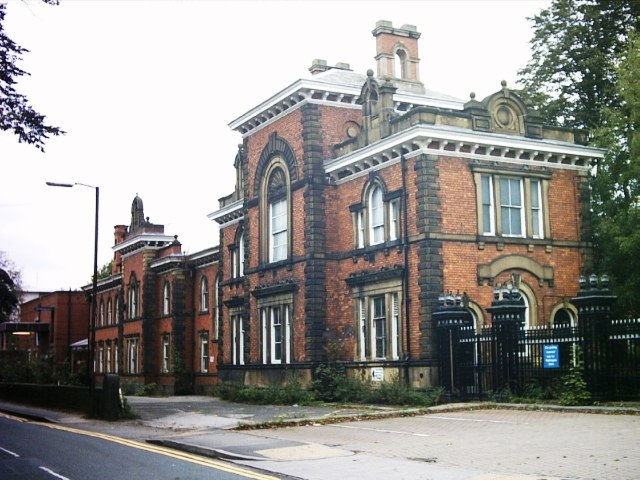
The Withington Workhouse, opened in 1855, was renamed Withington Hospital in 1915, shown here in 2005.

Chorlton Poor Law Union was founded in January 1837 in response to the Poor Law Amendment Act 1834, also known as the New Poor Law. It was overseen by an elected board of 19 guardians representing the 12 parishes in the area it served: Ardwick, Burnage, Chorlton-upon-Medlock, Chorlton with Hardy, Didsbury, Gorton, Hulme, Levenshulme, Moss Side, Rusholme, Stretford, and Withington, all (apart from Stretford) in present day south Manchester, England.

== Background ==
The Poor Law Amendment Act 1834 placed a legal responsibility on parishes to take responsibility for the poor in their areas by organising into poor law unions, each of which was to have at least one workhouse. The Act discouraged the provision of poor relief except through entry into workhouses, and signalled the construction of more than 500 across England and Wales during the next 50 years.

The townships in the union, Ardwick, Burnage, Chorlton-upon-Medlock, Chorlton with Hardy, Didsbury, Gorton, Hulme, Levenshulme, Mosside, Rusholme, Stretford, and Withington were in the ancient parish of Manchester; in 1838 Ardwick, Chorlton-upon-Medlock and Hulme were made part of the town of Manchester. The others, apart from Stretford, subsequently became part of the City of Manchester.

== Early history ==
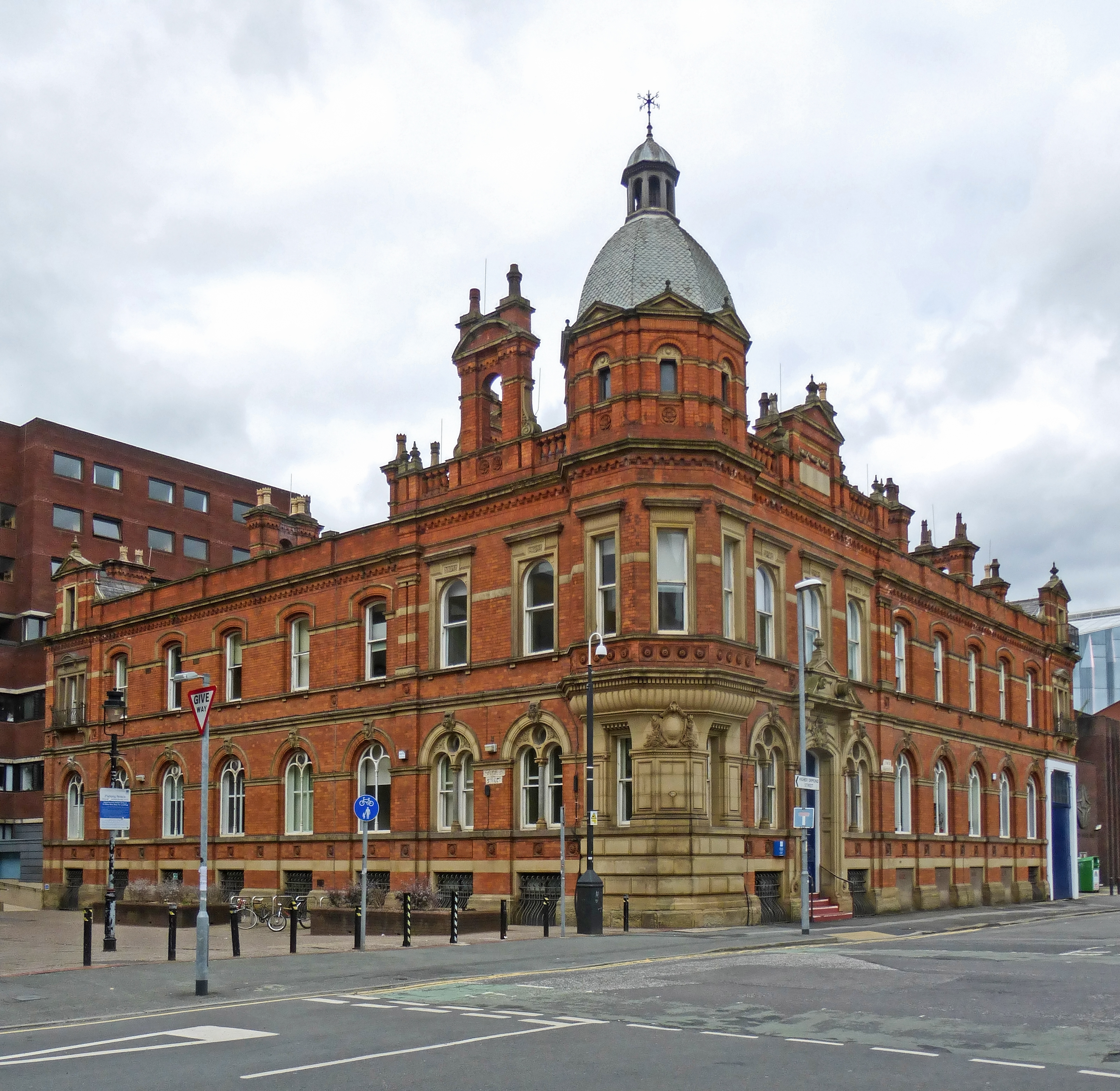
The Ormond Building, Cavendish Street

The union's first workhouse, the Stretford Road Workhouse, offered accommodation for 300 inmates, with segregated living areas for various categories of paupers, such as children, lunatics, the elderly, and the sick; female inmates were housed in the west of the building and males in the east, separated by a central communal dining hall and chapel. The population of the area served by the Chorlton Poor Law Union had been 46,465 at the time of the 1831 census, but as it rapidly increased during Manchester's industrialisation it became clear that the capacity of the Stretford Road Workhouse was inadequate for the demands placed on it. As the Stretford Road site offered no scope for expansion the guardians decided to commission the construction of a second workhouse, the Withington Workhouse. Opened in 1855, and costing £53,000 to build, the new workhouse was able to accommodate up to 1500 inmates. The site also included a new cemetery to serve the union's area, the Chorlton Union Cemetery, which remained in use until 1920.

The Offices of the Poor Law Guardians were built in 1881. The building was designed by Mangnall & Littlewood and also included a registry office. Since 1970 it has been used by Manchester Metropolitan University.

Emmeline Pankhurst was a member of the Board of Guardians.

== Later developments ==
In 1910 the Chorlton Union was consolidated into the South Manchester Township, which in turn became part of a unified Manchester Union in 1915, and the workhouse was renamed Withington Hospital.
