= East Didsbury railway station =

Railway station in Greater Manchester, England

Coordinates: 53°24′33″N 2°13′18.50″W

East Didsbury
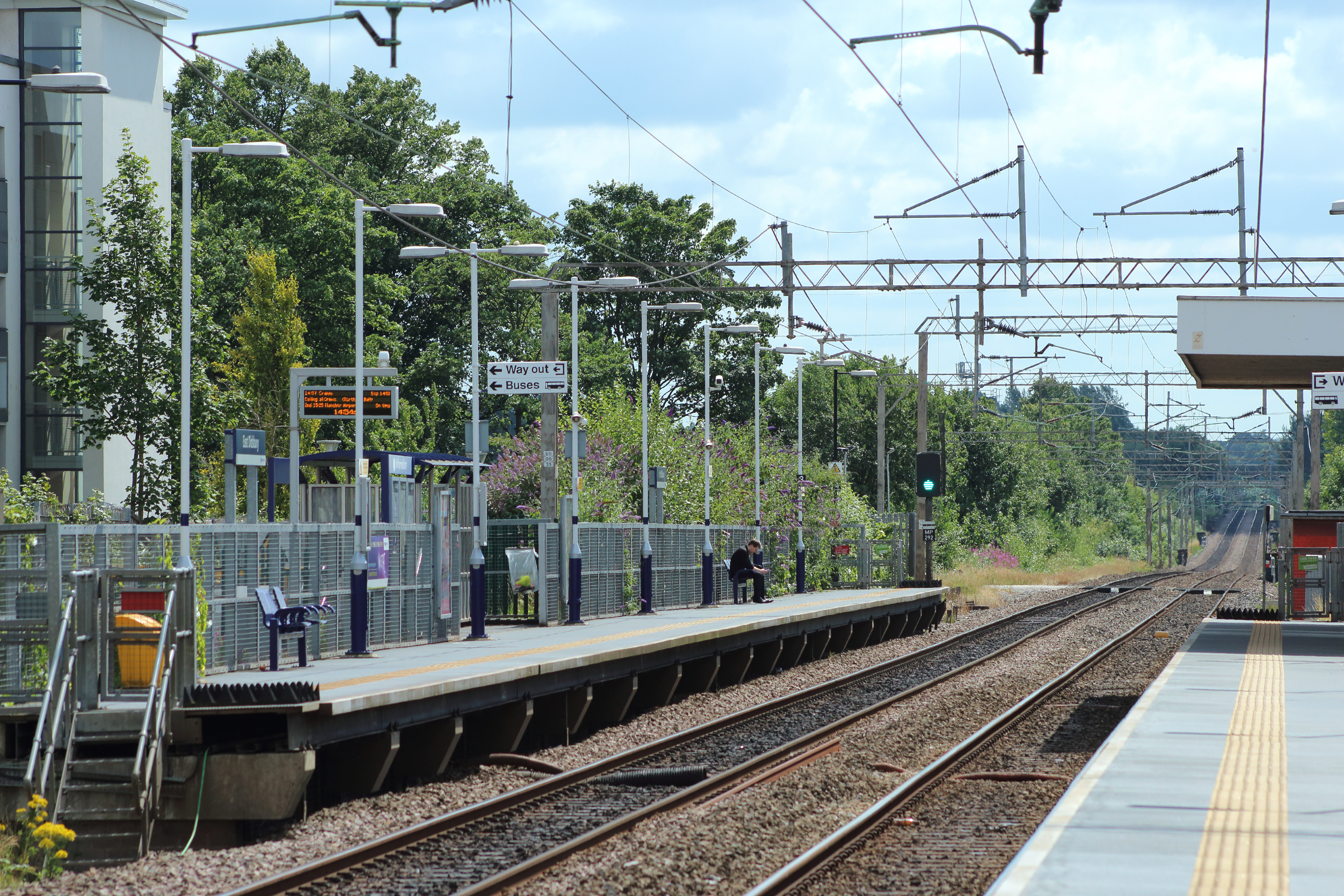
- View across to the southern platform in 2015

General information
- Location: East Didsbury, Manchester; England
- Grid reference: SJ853903
- Managed by: Northern Trains
- Transit authority: Transport for Greater Manchester
- Platforms: 2

Other information
- Station code: EDY
- Classification: DfT category E

Key dates
- 1909: Opened
- 2023: Platforms extended

Passengers
- 2020/21: ▼46,424
- 2021/22: ▲0.185 million
- 2022/23: ▲0.208 million
- 2023/24: ▲0.260 million
- 2024/25: ▲0.299 million
Location
Notes
- Passenger statistics from the Office of Rail and Road

East Didsbury is a suburban railway station in south Manchester, England. It is sited on the Styal Line between Longsight (Slade Lane Junction) and Wilmslow, providing direct access between Manchester Piccadilly and Manchester Airport. East Didsbury tram stop, on the Manchester Metrolink system, is located close by.

== History ==
East Didsbury station was opened in 1909 by the London and North Western Railway and, until 6 May 1974, was called East Didsbury and Parrs Wood. From 1923, the line was operated by the London Midland and Scottish Railway. Following the formation in 1948 of British Rail, services were operated by the London Midland Region of British Railways, then North-Western Regional Railways. The station was rebuilt in the 1959 by the architect to the London Midland section of British Rail, William Robert Headley.

Services to Manchester Airport began in 1993 upon the opening of the Manchester Airport spur. With the privatisation of rail services in 1996/7, East Didsbury was served by the North Western Trains franchise.

Work to extend the platforms was completed by March 2023.

== Other Didsbury stations ==
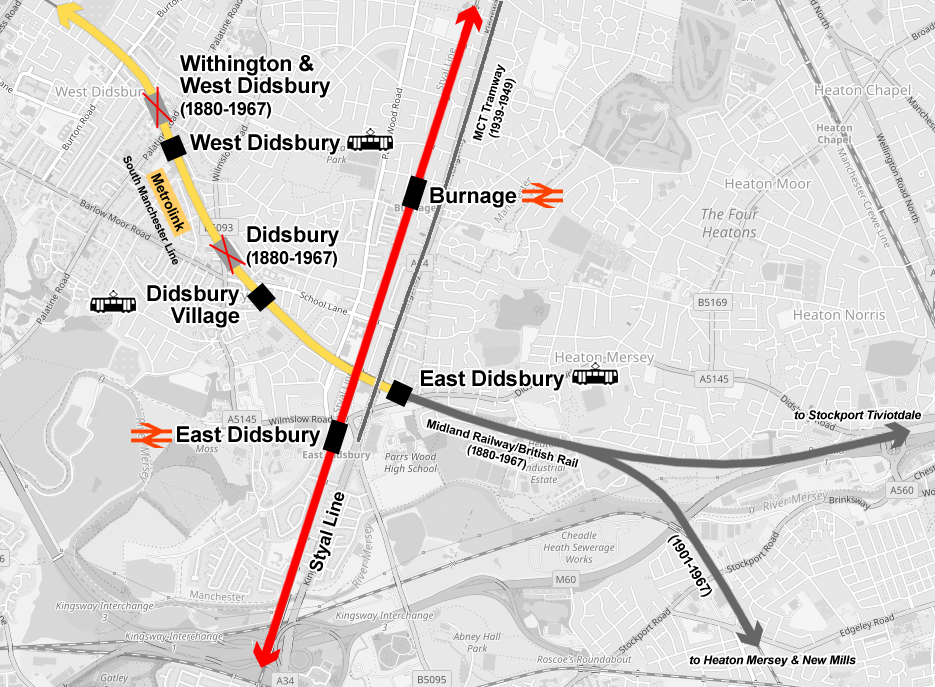
Map of Didsbury's railways past and present

Before the Beeching Axe of the 1960s, the Didsbury area was served by three railway stations: East Didsbury, Didsbury, and Withington and West Didsbury.

Didsbury railway station opened in 1880 in the centre of Didsbury Village on the Midland Railway's Manchester South District Line, which connected with the Cheshire Lines Committee line into Manchester Central. This connected to the Sheffield and Midland Railway Companies' Committee line from Chinley and the Midland Railway used it for its express services from London St Pancras. It closed in 1967 and, though the building was used for a while by a hardware dealer, it has now disappeared, apart from the platforms, a clock tower and a drinking fountain dedicated to the memory of a local philanthropist, Dr. D.J. Wilson Rhodes (1847–1900).

There was also Withington and West Didsbury, the next station on the line towards Manchester; the two being so similar in appearance that passengers sometimes alighted at the wrong one. Originally it was called "Withington", then from 1884 "Withington and Albert Park", receiving its final name in 1915. All that remains is a boundary wall; a block of flats (Brankgate Court) has been built on the site.

The former Midland line was partially re-opened to passengers in 2013 when it was converted into a light rail track for the Manchester Metrolink tram system.

== Services ==
The station is served by two train operating companies:

- Northern Trains runs hourly services each way between Liverpool Lime Street and Manchester Airport, and between Manchester Piccadilly and Crewe. On Sundays, the stopping service runs hourly between Liverpool Lime Street and Wilmslow, with a generally hourly service between Manchester Airport and Barrow-in-Furness.
- Transport for Wales operates 1tph between Llandudno and Manchester Airport. There are no services in Sundays.

| Preceding station | National Rail | Following station |
|---|---|---|
| Gatley | Northern Trains Manchester Airport to Liverpool Lime Street; Styal line | Burnage |
| Gatley | Northern Trains Manchester Piccadilly to Wilmslow local stopping service Styal line Monday to Saturday | Burnage |
| Heald Green | Northern Trains (Styal Line) Manchester Airport to Barrow-in-Furness/Windermere Sunday only | Manchester Piccadilly |
| Manchester Airport | Transport for Wales Rail (Styal Line) Manchester Airport to North Wales | Manchester Piccadilly |
