= Styal railway station =

Railway station in Cheshire, England

Coordinates: 53.348°N 2.240°W

Styal
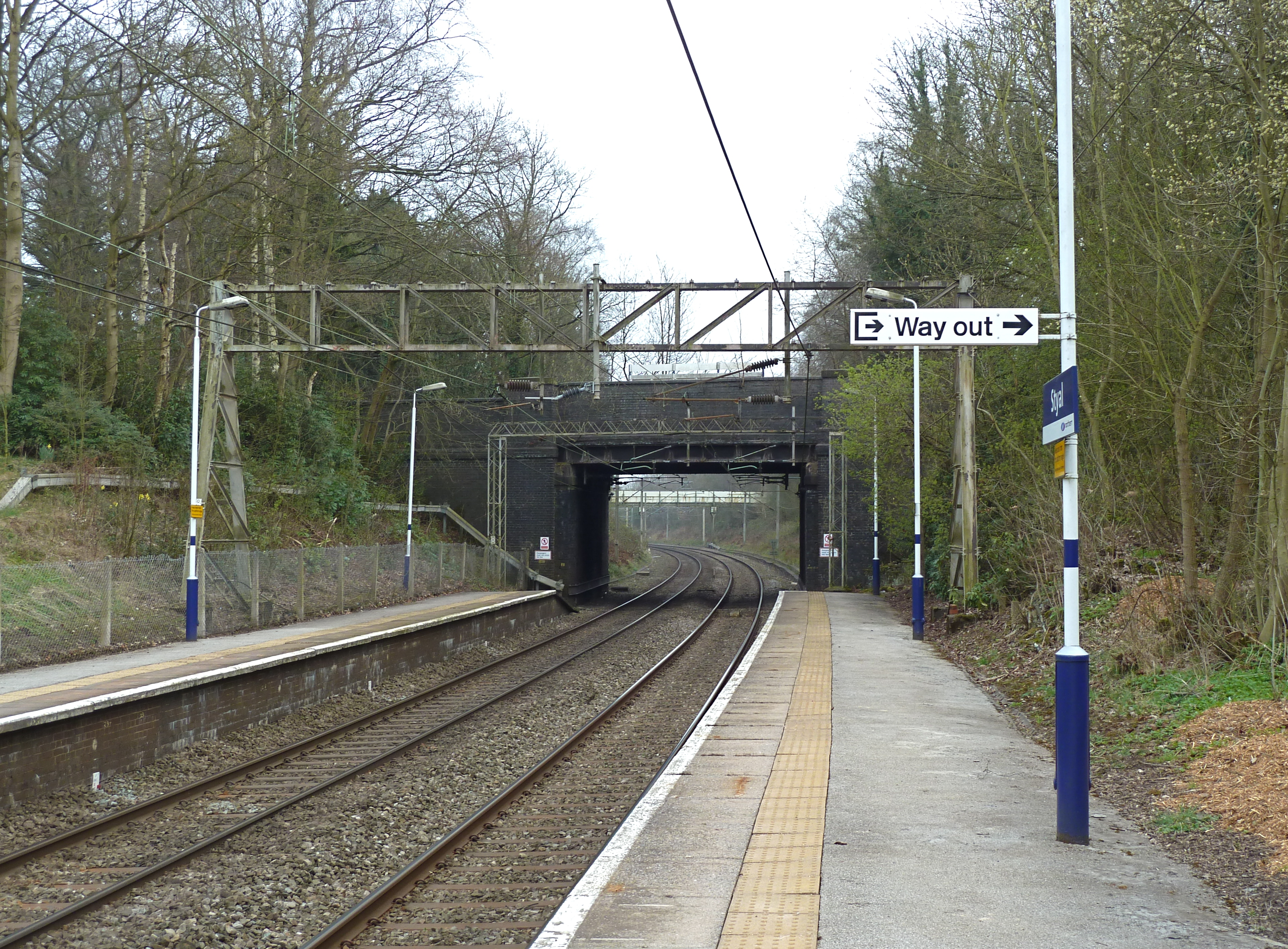
- Styal railway station in 2011

General information
- Location: Styal, Cheshire, England
- Grid reference: SJ840835
- Manager: Northern Trains
- Platforms: 2

Other information
- Station code: SYA
- Classification: DfT category F1

Key dates
- 1909: Opened

Passengers
- 2021/22: ▲11,498
- 2022/23: ▲21,454
- 2023/24: ▲23,568
- 2024/25: ▲28,058
- 2025/26: ▲30,016
Location
Notes
- Passenger statistics from the Office of Rail and Road

Styal railway station serves the village of Styal, in Cheshire, England. It is a stop on the Styal Line, which links Manchester Piccadilly, Manchester Airport and Wilmslow.

== History ==
The station was opened in 1909, with the construction of the line from Wilmslow to Manchester London Road (now Piccadilly).

It won numerous best-kept station garden awards in the 1940s and 1950s under stationmasters Mott, Hilton and Jackson. The garden is long abandoned, but there were plans to uncover and restore some of it in spring 2011.

Styal enjoyed a half-hourly service in each direction until the mid-1990s. The construction of the airport rail link in 1993 saw services reduced, with only 8 trains per day in each direction on Monday to Saturday; on Sundays, there was a two hourly service in each direction. This was gradually reduced down to a skeletal Monday - Saturday service and no Sunday service.

A petition was created to seek a resumption of a morning commuter service to Manchester and daytime services to serve HMP Styal, National Trust Styal and local residents.

Services were temporarily suspended in summer 2020 and again in early 2021, as a result of the COVID-19 pandemic; they have since been reinstated.

== Location ==
Styal station is on Station Road, to the east of the main road in the centre of the village.

It is sited close to the edge of the National Trust's Quarry Bank Mill/Styal Estate and Styal Women's Prison and Young Offenders' Institute.

== Facilities ==
The station has the following facilities:

- A ticket machine
- Customer information screens on both platforms
- Step-free access to both platforms
- A car park, beside the southbound platform.

== Services ==
Northern Trains operates all stopping services. The Monday-Saturday service pattern consists of one train per hour in each direction between Crewe and Manchester Piccadilly, via Manchester Airport.

On evenings and Sundays, there is an hourly service each way between Liverpool Lime Street and Wilmslow, via Manchester Piccadilly and Manchester Airport.

Preceding station	National Rail	Following station
Manchester Airport	Northern Trains Styal Line	Wilmslow
