= Gatley railway station =

Railway station in Greater Manchester, England

Coordinates: 53.392907°N 2.230836°W

Gatley
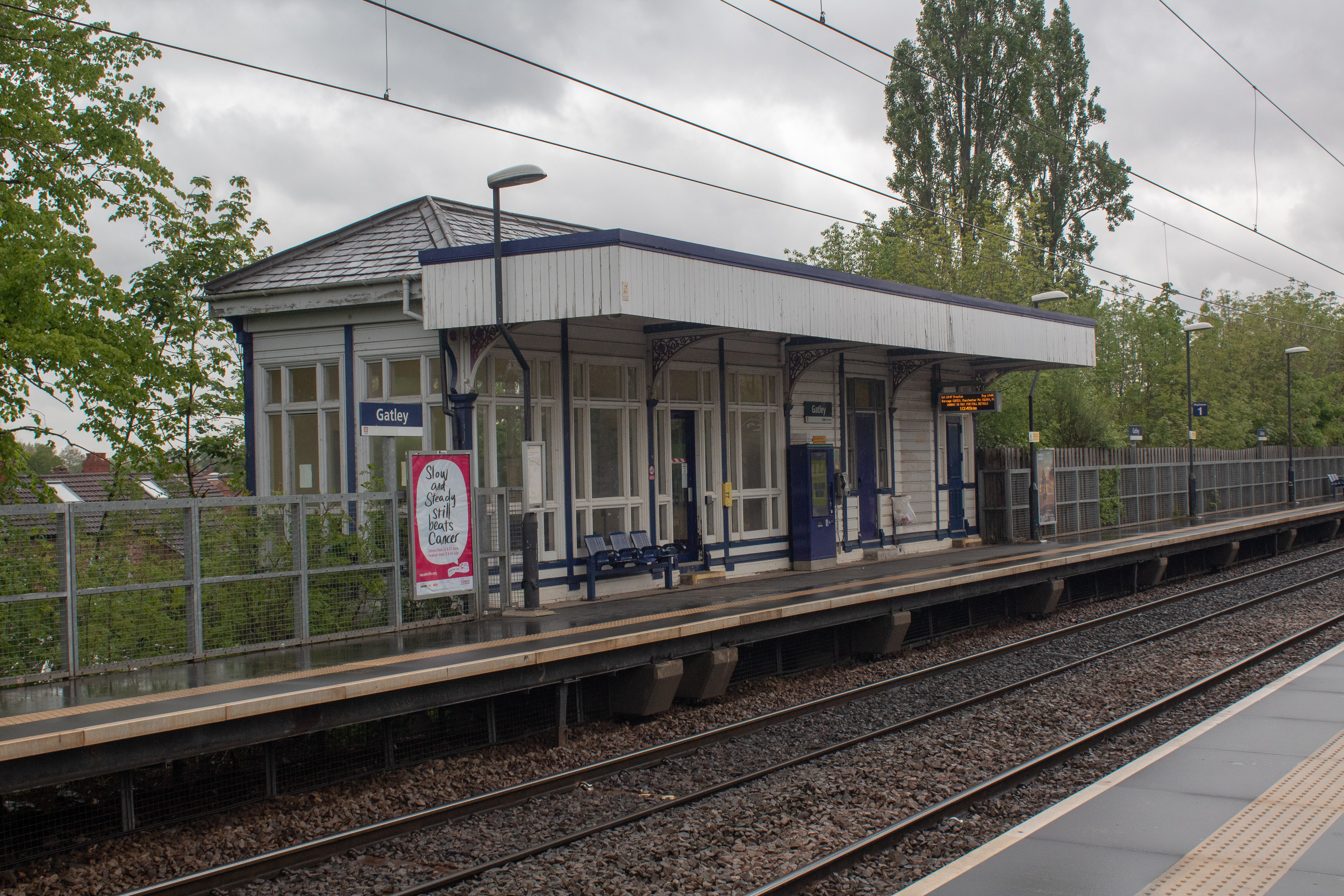
- Gatley station, 9 May 2019

General information
- Location: Gatley, Metropolitan Borough of Stockport, England
- Grid reference: SJ847886
- Managed by: Northern Trains
- Transit authority: Greater Manchester
- Platforms: 2

Other information
- Station code: GTY
- Classification: DfT category E

Key dates
- 1909: Opened
- 2023: Platforms extended

Passengers
- 2020/21: ▼66,656
- 2021/22: ▲0.252 million
- 2022/23: ▲0.287 million
- 2023/24: ▲0.306 million
- 2024/25: ▲0.374 million
Location
Notes
- Passenger statistics from the Office of Rail and Road

Gatley railway station is a stop on the Styal Line, in Greater Manchester, England. It serves the suburb of Gatley in the Metropolitan Borough of Stockport.

== History ==
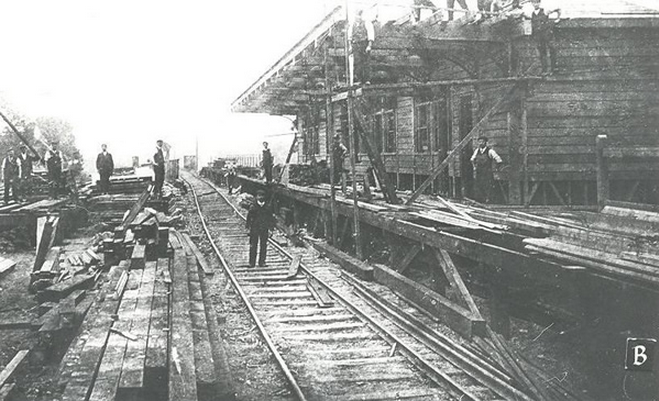
The station under construction in 1908

Gatley station was opened by the London and North Western Railway in 1909; it was first known as Gatley for Cheadle, before being renamed Gatley on 6 May 1974.

When the Styal line was electrified in 1960, there was a half-hourly electric service (Monday to Saturday) between Manchester Oxford Road and Alderley Edge operated by Class 304 electric multiple units. Services were extended to Altrincham, when the electrification was upgraded to 25 kV AC in 1971, and operated in this way until the line between Altrincham and Cornbrook Junction was transferred to Manchester Metrolink in 1990.

When Manchester Airport station opened in 1993, the Monday to Saturday service pattern was two trains per hour to Manchester Piccadilly, with two trains per hour in the opposite direction: one to Manchester Airport and the other continued onto Crewe. Sunday services consisted of obe train per hour to Manchester Airport, with one service every two hours continuing to Alderley Edge and one to Manchester Piccadilly.

Gatley station reopened on 28 January 2007, after reconstruction of the platforms and work to replace the ramp access to them. Electronic train service information screens were introduced in 2010 on each platform. In 2018, Arriva Rail North introduced ticket machines, which are on the northbound platform and at the bottom of the ramp for the southbound platform.

Work to extend the platforms at the station was completed in March 2023.

== Facilities ==
The station lies on the A560 Gatley Road and has a car park. The ticket office and waiting room, on the Manchester-bound platform, are only open in the morning.

== Services ==
Gatley station is served by two train operating companies, which provide the following general off-peak service in trains per hour/day (tph/tpd):

Northern Trains:

- 2 tph to Manchester Airport
- 1 tph to Manchester Piccadilly
- 1 tph to Crewe
- 1 tph to Liverpool Lime Street
- 1 tph to Lancaster, via Preston; of which:
  - most continue to Barrow-in-Furness
  - others continue to Windermere.

On Sundays, there is 1 tp2h in each direction between Manchester Airport and Liverpool Lime Street.

TransPennine Express:

- 1 tpd to Manchester Airport.

On Sundays, there is 1 tph in each direction between Manchester Airport and Redcar Central, with occasional extensions to Saltburn.

Preceding station	National Rail	Following station
Heald Green	Northern Trains Styal Line local stopping service Monday to Saturday	East Didsbury
Heald Green	Northern Trains Liverpool Lime Street to Manchester Airport Line	East Didsbury
Manchester Airport	Northern Trains Manchester Airport to Barrow-in-Furness/Windermere Line; Monday to Saturday	Manchester Piccadilly
Manchester Airport	TransPennine Express North Route Manchester Airport to Saltburn; Sunday only	Manchester Piccadilly
