= Heald Green railway station =

Railway station in Greater Manchester, England

Coordinates: 53.3696°N 2.2366°W

Heald Green
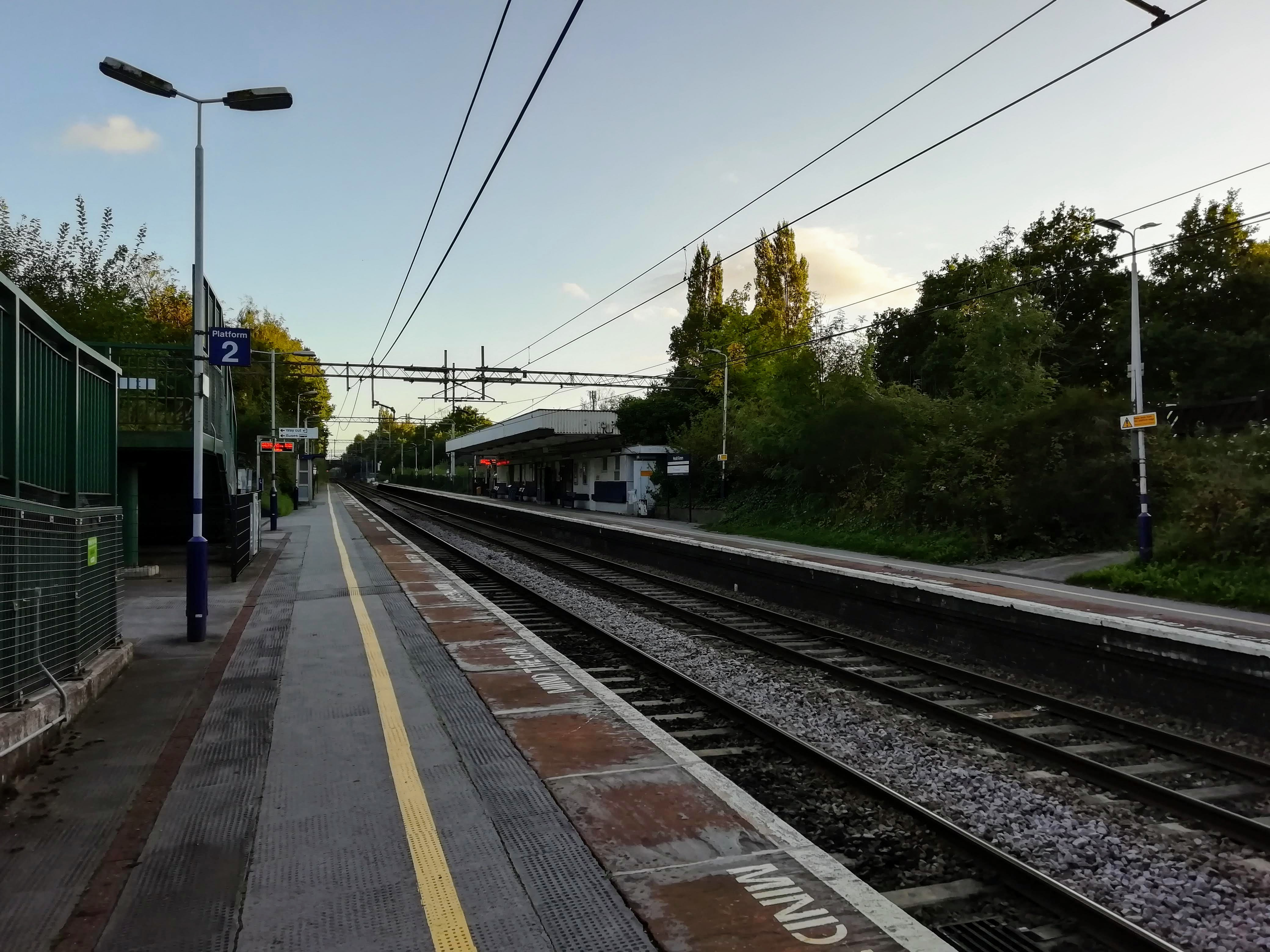
- Looking south

General information
- Location: Heald Green, Stockport; England
- Grid reference: SJ847886
- Managed by: Northern Trains
- Transit authority: Transport for Greater Manchester
- Platforms: 2

Other information
- Station code: HDG
- Classification: DfT category E

Key dates
- 1909: Opened

Passengers
- 2020/21: ▼84,318
- Interchange: ▼3
- 2021/22: ▲0.265 million
- Interchange: ▲12
- 2022/23: ▲0.319 million
- Interchange: ▲2,889
- 2023/24: ▲0.358 million
- Interchange: ▲3,365
- 2024/25: ▲0.420 million
- Interchange: ▲3,886
Location
Notes
- Passenger statistics from the Office of Rail and Road

Heald Green railway station serves the suburb of Heald Green in Stockport, Greater Manchester, England. The station is a stop on the Styal line.

== History ==
The Styal line was opened in 1909 by the London & North Western Railway, between the Slade Lane Junction (north of Mauldeth Road) and Wilmslow.

To the south of the station is Heald Green Junction, a triangular junction for the branch to Manchester Airport which opened in 1993.

== Facilities ==
Heald Green has a ticket office on platform 1. Ticket vending machines are in place on both platforms for purchase of tickets or promise to pay coupons, for when the ticket office is closed and for the collection of pre-paid tickets.

Both platforms have waiting shelters with metal seating, electronic departure boards and automated audio announcements. Platform one has a station building which includes a small waiting room, ticket office and timetables. There is a small car park, with 14 spaces. Platform 1 is accessed from the car park and platform 2 is accessed via a long ramp; interchange between them requires crossing over the Finney Lane bridge at the north end of the station.

== Services ==
The basic Monday to Saturday off-peak service comprises:

- One train per hour in each direction (1tph) between Manchester Piccadilly and Crewe
- 1tph between Manchester Airport and Blackpool North
- 1tph between Manchester Airport and Liverpool Lime Street, via Newton-le-Willows.

On Sundays, there is:

- 1tph between Manchester Airport and Liverpool Lime Street, which is extended to terminate at Wilmslow
- 1tph between Manchester Airport and Blackpool North, with some irregular supplementary services to Barrow-in-Furness and Windermere, via Chorley.

| Preceding station | National Rail | Following station |
|---|---|---|
| Manchester Airport | Northern Trains Styal line | Gatley |
