= Wilmslow railway station =

Railway station in Cheshire, England

Wilmslow
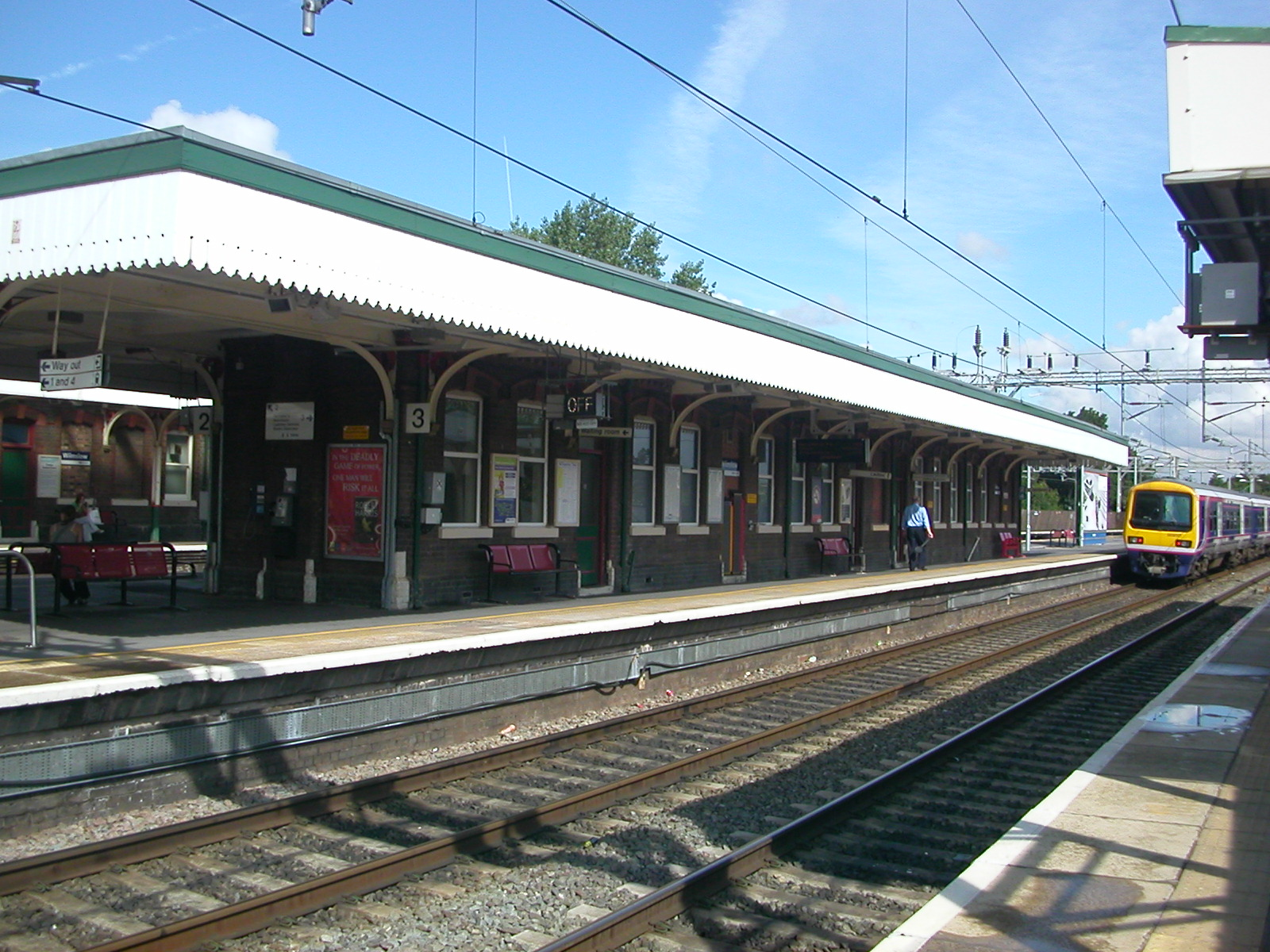
- The station in 2007

General information
- Location: Wilmslow, Cheshire East, England
- Coordinates: 53.327°N 2.226°W
- Grid reference: SJ850811
- Manager: Northern Trains
- Platforms: 4

Other information
- Station code: WML
- Classification: DfT category C2

History
- Opened: 1842

Key dates
- 1959: Electrified

Passengers
- 2020/21: ▼0.260 million
- Interchange: ▼16,853
- 2021/22: ▲0.838 million
- Interchange: ▲66,870
- 2022/23: ▲0.993 million
- Interchange: ▲90,395
- 2023/24: ▲1.136 million
- Interchange: ▲93,226
- 2024/25: ▲1.249 million
- Interchange: ▲0.110 million
Location
Notes
- Passenger statistics from the Office of Rail and Road

Wilmslow railway station serves the town of Wilmslow, in Cheshire, England. It lies 12 miles (19 km) south of Manchester Piccadilly and 6 miles (9.7 km) south of Stockport on the Crewe to Manchester Line, a spur of the West Coast Main Line. It is a junction with the Styal line, which takes an alternative route to Piccadilly via Styal, Manchester Airport and Heald Green.

== History ==
Both the main and Styal lines were electrified in 1959, as part of the West Coast Main Line electrification and modernisation programme. This included construction and installation of a state of the art signal box and control centre, near to the end of the Styal line down platform, and serving virtually the entire railway from Crewe to Manchester on both routes. The complexity of that installation was not repeated for the remainder of the electrification scheme, which had its control and signalling systems renewed in ways that were less highly automated.

In March 1997, the Provisional IRA exploded two bombs in relay boxes, near to this signal box, causing disruption to rail and road services. The railway reopened the following day.

In April 2006, as part of the total renewal of the railway from Crewe to Cheadle Hulme, the large 1959 signal box was demolished.

Large-scale resignalling of the line through Wilmslow was completed behind schedule in the autumn of 2006.

The economic case for High Speed 2 Phase 1 included one train per hour each way stopping at Wilmslow, travelling between London Euston and Manchester Piccadilly.

== Facilities ==
The station has four platforms with disabled access to all of them. There are two waiting rooms, public toilets and also has a double-staffed booking office below the platforms.

== Services ==
Wilmslow station is served by three train operating companies, which provide the following general off-peak service in trains per hour (tph):

Avanti West Coast:

- 1 tph to Manchester Piccadilly, via Stockport
- 1 tph to London Euston, via Crewe.

Northern Trains:

- 2 tph to Manchester Piccadilly, via Stockport
- 1 tph to Manchester Piccadilly, via Manchester Airport
- 1 tph to Alderley Edge
- 2 tph to Crewe.

Transport for Wales:

- 1 tph to Manchester Piccadilly
- 1 tph to Cardiff Central, via Crewe, Shrewsbury and Hereford; alternate services continue on to Carmarthen, Fishguard Harbour, Milford Haven or Pembroke Dock.

Preceding station	National Rail	Following station
Crewe	Avanti West Coast West Coast Main Line	Stockport
Crewe	Transport for Wales Rail Welsh Marches line	Stockport
Alderley Edge	Northern Trains Crewe–Manchester line	Handforth
Alderley Edge	Northern Trains Crewe to Liverpool Lime Street via Chat Moss (Styal line local stopping service)	Manchester Airport
Alderley Edge	Northern Trains Crewe to Liverpool Lime Street via Chat Moss (Styal line local stopping service)	Styal
Terminus	Northern Trains Wilmslow to Liverpool Lime Street (Monday to Saturday nighttimes and Sundays only)	Styal
