= Manchester Airport station =

Railway station in Greater Manchester, England

Manchester Airport
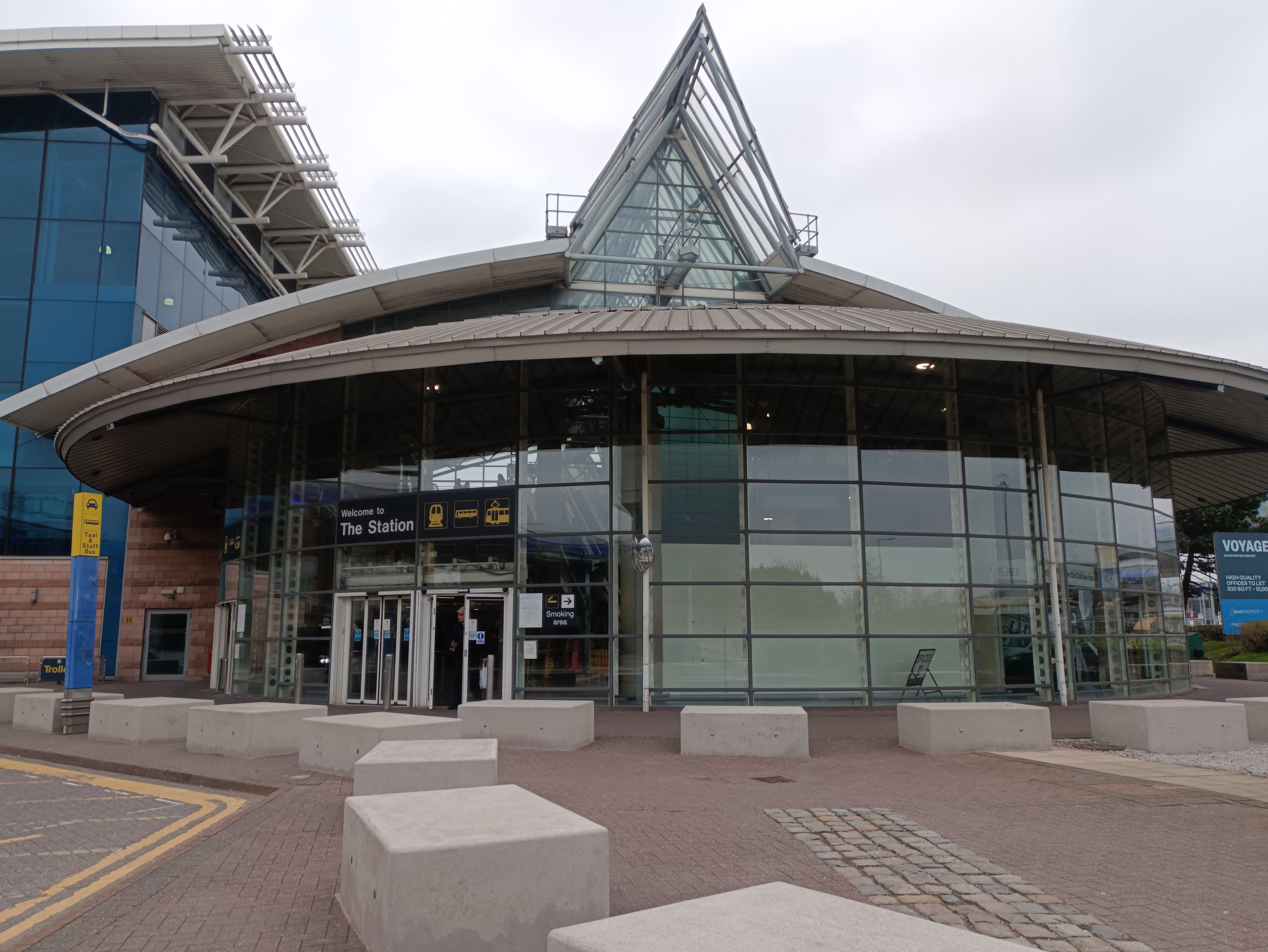
- 2026

General information
- Location: Ringway, Manchester, England
- Grid reference: SJ819853
- Manager: TransPennine Express
- Transit authority: Transport for Greater Manchester
- Platforms: 4

Other information
- Station code: MIA
- Fare zone: 4 (Metrolink)
- Classification: DfT category B

Key dates
- May 1993: Opened
- 2004: Refurbished
- 2008: Third platform opened
- 2014: Metrolink services begin
- 2015: Fourth platform added

Passengers
- 2021/22: ▲2.174 million
- Interchange: ▲14,518
- 2022/23: ▲3.917 million
- Interchange: ▲16,945
- 2023/24: ▲4.855 million
- Interchange: ▲19,836
- 2024/25: ▲5.518 million
- Interchange: ▲21,499
- 2025/26: ▲5.837 million
- Interchange: ▲24,392
Location
Notes
- Passenger statistics from the Office of Rail and Road

Manchester Airport station is a railway, tram, bus and coach station at Manchester Airport, in Greater Manchester, England. It was opened at the same time as the second air terminal in 1993. The station lies at the end of a short branch from the Styal line via a triangular junction between Heald Green and Styal stations. Manchester Metrolink tram services were extended to the airport in 2014 and operate to Manchester Victoria.

== History ==
=== New platforms ===
In December 2008, a third platform opened after a year of construction and a total cost of £15 million. In the following year, Network Rail noted that it had "greatly increased operational flexibility at the station, and reduced the number of times that late-running trains had to be terminated at Manchester Piccadilly."

In 2009, Network Rail stated that the creation of the third platform has meant that the capacity at Manchester Airport will become constrained by the layover of the trains and congestion at the throat. To solve this issue they have recommended building a line underneath the airport towards Northwich in the 2019 to 2024 period.

In July 2012, support for a fourth railway platform was announced by the Government. The current platforms are eight carriage lengths long, so each can accommodate two trains of four carriages. A fourth platform will allow greater use of longer trains of six carriages or more. This had been recommended as part of the Northern Hub scheme of rail improvements around Manchester by the 2010 Manchester Hub Rail Study and the 2011 Northern Route Utilisation Strategy, with an estimated cost of £23 million.

In February 2014, construction commenced on a new £20M fourth platform at the station. The start of construction was attended by the Chancellor of the Exchequer, George Osborne. Construction of the new platform was completed in May 2015 - three years earlier than the 2018 estimate given in 2012. This was to allow engineering work to overlap with that being done on the Manchester Metrolink extension to the airport (see below) so that the fourth platform could be used for the extra traffic generated by the Ordsall Chord (opened 10 December 2017), while the fourth platform itself opened to passengers in Autumn 2015.

=== HS2 ===
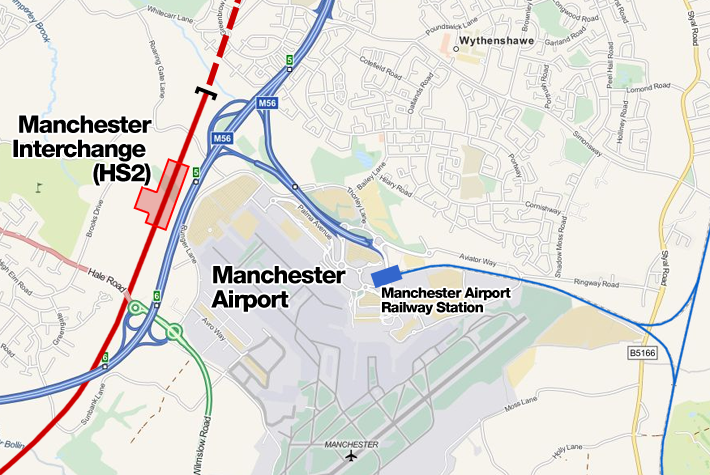
The proposed Manchester Airport High Speed Station

In January 2013, the Government announced that Manchester Airport would be included in the second phase of the High Speed 2 railway line. This would enable Manchester Airport to be reached from London Euston in 59 minutes. The new line and associated new station would pass to the west of the Airport, away from the existing railway station and transport interchange, giving the airport two disconnected railways stations approximately 1 mile apart. On 4 October 2023, it was confirmed that the Manchester leg of High Speed 2 would be scrapped and, as a result, the new high-speed station at Manchester Airport would not be built.

== Description ==
The station lies 9 3/4 miles (15.7 km) south of Manchester Piccadilly, at the end of a short branch from the Styal Line; it was constructed by British Rail in 1993. A branch of Manchester Metrolink runs into it. It is accessed via a triangular junction located between Heald Green and Styal. The station platforms are connected by escalator, lift, ramps and an elevated covered walkway (known as the Sky Link) to the airport terminal buildings in which is a staffed railway ticket office. Throughout the airport complex, the railway station is known as The Station and is signposted as such.

== National Rail services ==
Map showing heavy rail and Metrolink access to the airport

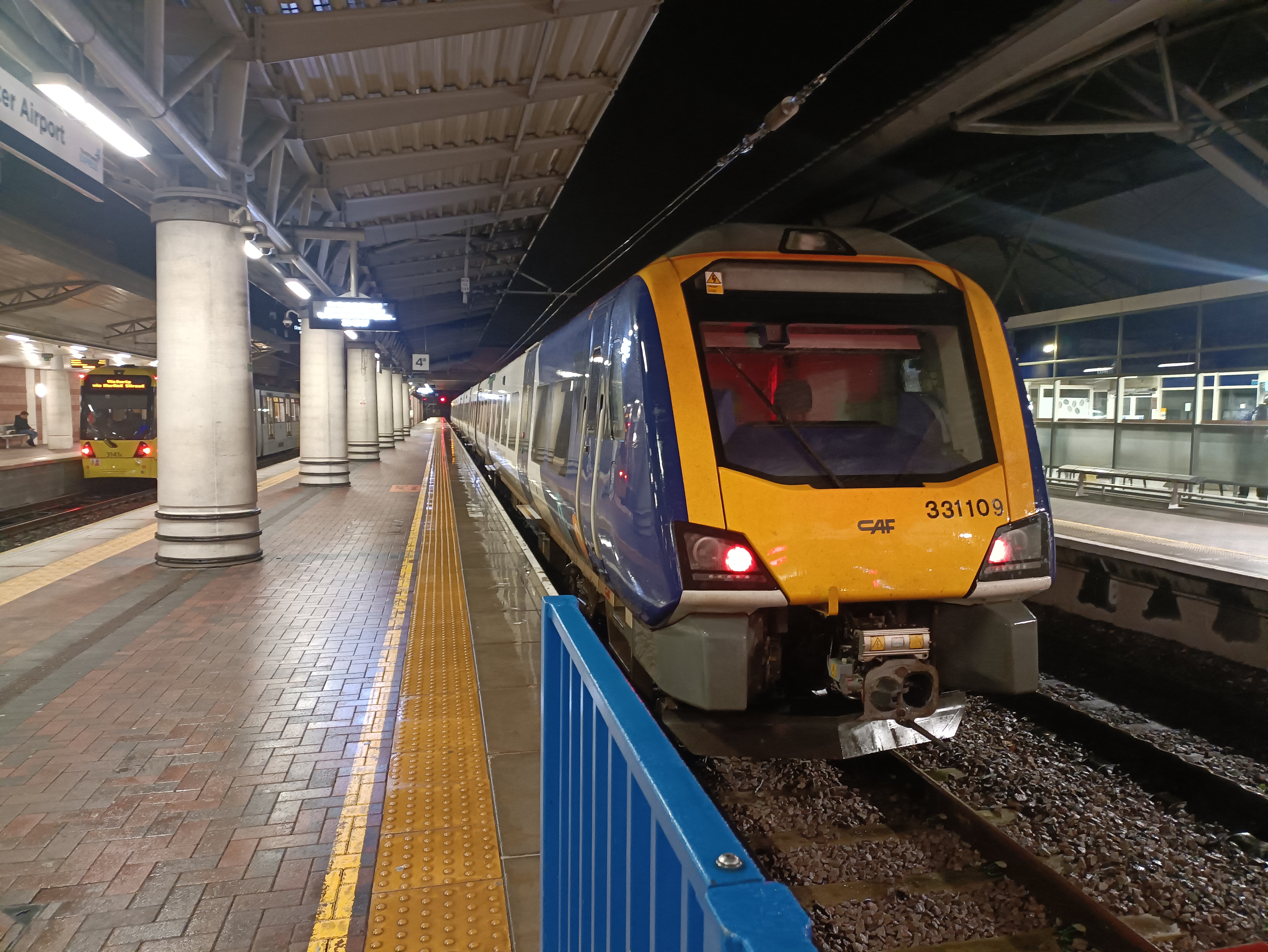
A Northern Trains electric multiple unit on platform 4b arriving from Manchester Piccadilly

The station is managed by TransPennine Express, which operates services along with Northern Trains and Transport for Wales. There are eight trains per hour (tph) to Manchester Piccadilly and beyond; seven of which start and end their journeys here, and the other continues south to Crewe via Wilmslow.

The general off-peak service pattern is as follows:

TransPennine Express

- 1tph to Redcar Central, via Middlesbrough
- 1tph to Carlisle, continuing alternately to Edinburgh Waverley or Glasgow Central.

Northern Trains

- 2tph to Blackpool North
- 1tph to Lancaster, of which 11tpd continue to Barrow-in-Furness and 4tpd continue to Windermere
- 1tph to Liverpool Lime Street, via Newton-le-Willows
- 1tph to Manchester Piccadilly
- 1tph to Crewe.

Transport for Wales

- 1tph to Chester; most trains continue to Llandudno, with 2tpd continuing to Holyhead.

It was planned that infrastructure developments that are part of the Northern Hub system of schemes, such as the Ordsall Chord, should enable direct trains to Manchester Victoria and on towards Bradford Interchange from May 2019. However, the introduction of the May 2018 timetable, one of the most radical in decades, caused punctuality through Manchester to drop sharply and it became common for TransPennine Express to terminate delayed services at Manchester Piccadilly or Victoria rather than continue onto the final destination at Manchester Airport.

Any future additional services to the airport are in doubt without further infrastructure works; unresolved issues surround the lack of new 'through' platforms at Manchester Piccadilly which have been shelved by the government and the Styal Line to Manchester Airport operating at full capacity with little resilience to absorb delays.

Preceding station	National Rail	Following station
Terminus	Transport for Wales Rail Chester to Manchester Line	East Didsbury
Terminus	TransPennine Express Anglo-Scottish Route	Manchester Piccadilly
Terminus	TransPennine Express North TransPennine	Manchester Piccadilly
Terminus	TransPennine Express North TransPennine	Gatley
Terminus	Northern Trains Manchester Airport to Blackpool North	Heald Green
Terminus	Northern Trains Manchester Airport to Blackpool North	Manchester Piccadilly
Terminus	Northern Trains Windermere/Barrow-in-Furness to Manchester Airport	Gatley
Terminus	Northern Trains Windermere/Barrow-in-Furness to Manchester Airport	Heald Green
Terminus	Northern Trains Manchester Airport to Liverpool Lime Street	Heald Green
Styal	Northern Trains Styal line local stopping service	Heald Green

== Manchester Metrolink ==
Manchester Airport
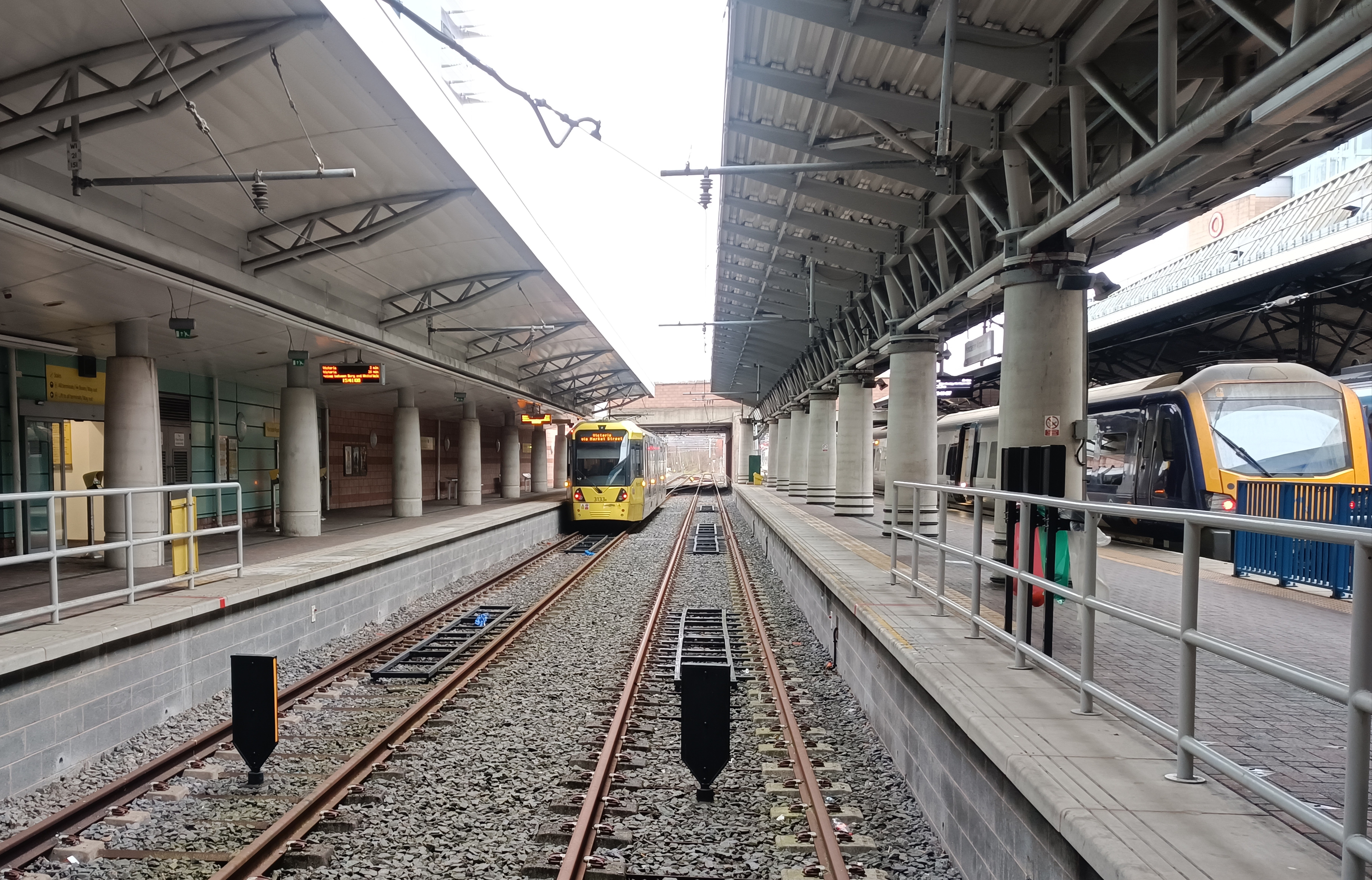
- Metrolink platform

General information
- Location: Manchester; England
- Coordinates: 53.36540°N 2.27229°W
- System: Metrolink station
- Line: Airport Line
- Platforms: 1

Other information
- Status: In operation
- Fare zone: 4

History
- Opened: 3 November 2014; 12 years ago
Route map
Location

The Manchester Metrolink light rail network was extended from St Werburgh's Road to Manchester Airport as part of the Phase 3 expansion project. The Metrolink station has been built adjacent to the airport station. It is the terminus of the Airport Line.

Following a period of uncertainty due to funding problems, the plans were finally given the go-ahead in May 2009. The confirmed route would not complete the full airport loop as proposed, but trams would run along the northern route via Wythenshawe. Completion of the western side of the loop is subject to further funding in a later project. An opening date of Summer 2016 had originally been indicated for opening of the Airport line but the line opened early on 3 November 2014.

=== Metrolink services ===
Trams run between Manchester Airport and Victoria every 12 minutes.

Preceding station	Manchester Metrolink	Following station
Terminus	Manchester Airport–Victoria	Shadowmoss towards Victoria

=== Ticket zones ===
With the introduction to a zonal ticketing system on Metrolink services in January 2019, Manchester Airport is located within zone 4.
