= Listed buildings in Manchester-M20 =

Manchester is a city in Northwest England. The M20 postcode area of the city includes the suburbs of Didsbury and Withington. This postcode area contains 66 listed buildings that are recorded in the National Heritage List for England. Of these, four are listed at Grade II*, the middle of the three grades, and the others are at Grade II, the lowest grade. The area is mainly residential, and most of the listed buildings are houses and associated structures. The other listed buildings include churches and structures in churchyards, hotels and public houses, civic buildings, buildings in the Didsbury Campus of Manchester Metropolitan University, a former hospital and its lodges, banks, a clock tower, a school, a milestone and a war memorial.

== Key ==
Grade	Criteria
II*	Particularly important buildings of more than special interest
II	Buildings of national importance and special interest

== Buildings ==
Name and location	Photograph	Date	Notes	Grade
St James' Church, Didsbury; 53.41002°N 2.23178°W		1620	The church has been altered and extended on a number of occasions, with the tower being the earliest part. The nave dates from 1855, the chancel from 1871, and the east half of the south aisle from 1895. The church is in red sandstone with slate roofs, and consists of a nave, north and south aisles, a chancel with a parallel south transept and vestry, and a west tower. The two-stage tower has a moulded plinth, diagonal buttresses, a Perpendicular doorway, a moulded cornice, and a parapet with openwork hoops and crocketed corner pinnacles. The east window has ten lights and contains Perpendicular tracery.	II*
Fletcher Moss Art Gallery; 53.41061°N 2.23164°W		17th century	Also known as the Old Parsonage, the house is in roughcast brick with slate roofs, hipped at the ends. There are two storeys, a main range of four bays, end bays treated a cross-wings, and two further bays at the east end. On the front is a wrought iron porch and three different canted bay windows. On the ground floor is a casement window, and on the upper floor the windows are sashes.	II
Red Lion Inn; 53.43137°N 2.22895°W		17th century	The public house was extended at the rear in the 20th century. It is in roughcast brick with a slate roof, and has a long single-depth plan with two low storeys and six bays. On the front are doorways with canopies, and windows with horizontal-sliding sashes and small panes.	II
Broome House; 53.41356°N 2.23068°W	—	Early to mid-18th century	A Georgian house, roughcast on brick with slate roofs, it was greatly extended in the 19th century and later used for other purposes. The entrance block is the earliest, with 2½ storeys and a symmetrical front of five bays, the central three bays bowed, with a dentilled cornice, and canted wings on the sides. In the centre is a doorway that has an Ionic doorcase with decorated capitals, an open pediment, and a door with a fanlight. The windows are sashes.	II
Sundial; 53.40991°N 2.23169°W		18th century	The sundial is to the south of St James' Church. It is in sandstone, and consists of a square base, a pedestal in the form of a column with a square foot, and has a moulded annular cap. The plate and gnomon are missing.	II
15 and 17 Millgate Lane; 53.40844°N 2.22904°W	—	Late 18th century	A pair of cottages in brown brick with a slate roof. They have a double-depth plan, two storeys, and each cottage has two bays. The windows are casements with three lights, those on the ground floor with segmental heads.	II
18 and 20 Stenner Lane; 53.41040°N 2.23347°W		Late 18th century	A pair of cottages, No. 18, with two bays, being the earlier, later one bay was added to the left, and in the 19th century No. 20, with two bays was added further to the left. The cottages are in red brick with some sandstone dressings, a slate roof, a double depth plan, and two storeys. Most of the windows in No. 18 are casements. No. 20 has a central gabled wooden porch and the windows are sashes with wedge lintels.	II
801 Wilmslow Road; 53.41047°N 2.22945°W	—	Late 18th century (probable)	A small house in rendered brick, with a band and a slate roof. It has a double-depth plan, two storeys, and a symmetrical front of two bays. In the centre is a doorway with a lean-to latticed porch. The windows on the front are sashes, and at the rear are horizontally-sliding sash windows.	II
844 and 846 Wilmslow Road; 53.41078°N 2.23100°W		Late 18th century	Originally two cottages, later a restaurant, it is in brick with a slate roof. There is a double-depth plan, two storeys, No. 846 has three bays, No. 844 has one bay, and there is a rear extension. No. 846 has a symmetrical front with a central doorway flanked by windows with pilasters, above which is a fascia and a cornice. On the upper floor are casement windows and a blind window in the centre. No. 844 has a doorway and a sash window on the ground floor and a casement window above.	II
Crispins Restaurant; 53.41807°N 2.23184°W	—	Late 18th century	A cottage, later a restaurant, with two low storeys and two bays. On the ground floor is a central doorway flanked by rectangular windows, and on the upper floor are segmental-headed four-pane windows.	II
Parrs Wood House; 53.40929°N 2.21748°W		Late 18th century (probable)	A country house later used for other purposes, it is stuccoed, on a plinth, and has a band, a cornice, and a hipped slate roof. The building consists of a main block with two unequal service wings at the north. The main block has two storeys and three bays with a three-bay wing to the left. In the centre of the main block is a bowed porch with engaged Tuscan columns, a triglyph frieze, a cornice with a wrought iron balustrade, and a round-headed doorway with a fanlight. At the top of the bay is a pediment, and the windows are sashes. In the south front is a two-storey bow window, and there is a single-storey bow window on the east front.	II*
Ye Olde Cock Inn; 53.41065°N 2.23106°W		Late 18th century	A brick public house, roughcast at the front, with a moulded gutter cornice and a green slate roof, it has a long rectangular plan with rear extensions. There are three storeys and five bays. On the front are two doorways, one with a pediment, and the other with a flat-roofed porch on two columns. Most of the windows are sash windows, towards the centre is a two-storey canted bay window, and to the right is a single storey canted bay window.	II
Administrative building, Didsbury Campus; 53.41203°N 2.23042°W		c. 1790	Originally a house that was encased in 1840–42 to form a theological college, and later part of Manchester Metropolitan University. The front range is built in sandstone and the rear ranges are in brick with sandstone dressings, and the roofs are slated. The building consists of four ranges enclosing a rectangular courtyard, and is in Classical style. The front has a central block of three storeys and five bays, flanked by wings with two storeys and two bays and by slightly projecting pavilions. The ground floor is rusticated, and in the central block there are giant pilasters on the upper floors and a pediment. The central doorway has a square head and a moulded surround, and the windows are sashes. The side ranges have twelve bays, and the rear range has 16 bays.	II*
Former coach house and stable block and wall, Parrs Wood House; 53.41045°N 2.21790°W	—	Late 18th or early 19th century	The buildings are in red brick with slate roofs, and form an L-shaped plan, with the main block facing west, and a rear wing at the south end. The main block has two storeys and a symmetrical front of three bays with flanking gabled wings. It contains sash windows, blank arches and pitching holes. The wing contains a central large round-headed arch above which is a pediment, and an oculus flanked by pigeon holes. Also on the front are windows and a doorway, and at the rear is an arcade of shallow elliptical arches. On the east and north sides is a brick wall about 3 metres (9.8 ft) high enclosing the courtyard.	II
Moor Cottage, Beech Cottage, and adjoining cottage 53.41534°N 2.23067°W	—	Late 18th or early 19th century	A house and a cottage in red and yellow brick, rendered at the rear, with slate roofs. Both parts have two storeys. Moss Cottage has three bays, and a central doorway with a fanlight and a canopy. In the right bay is semi-hexagonal full-height bay window, and in the left bay is a single-storey rectangular bay window. Beech Cottage, recessed to the left, has two bays, and a doorway with a fanlight. The windows in both parts are sashes.	II
Pampers; 53.43436°N 2.22817°W	—	Early 19th century	A brick shop with a slate roof, a double-depth plan, two low storeys and two bays. On the ground floor is a doorway with a shop window under a canopy to the right and a sash window to the left. On the upper floor is a large signboard flanked by sash windows.	II
Park Cottage; 53.43041°N 2.24094°W	—	c. 1830	A house in red brick with a Welsh slate roof, a double-pile plan, the rear pile having been added in the later 19th century, two storeys, and a symmetrical front of three bays. The central doorway is approached by steps and has a semicircular head and fanlight, and the windows are sashes. At the rear is a two-storey attached outbuilding and a further single-storey outbuilding.	II
7–13 Millgate Lane; 53.40993°N 2.22928°W		Early to mid-19th century	A row of three cottages and a shop in brick with a slate roof. They have a double-depth plan, two storeys, and one bay each. The doorways are round-headed with blind fanlights. No. 13 has a rectangular bay window, and the other windows are sashes.	II
Philip Godlee Lodge; 53.41106°N 2.23199°W		Early to mid-19th century	A house, formerly known as The Elms, converted into apartments. It is in roughcast brick with sandstone dressings and slate roofs, and has a main block with a square plan, and an L-shaped wing to the south. The main block has two storeys, and a symmetrical front of three bays with corner pilasters, a frieze, and projecting eaves. On the front is an Ionic porch and a door with a fanlight, and the windows are sashes with reeded architraves. At the rear is a segmental bay window, and a wrought iron verandah.	II
Pine House; 53.41314°N 2.22863°W		c. 1840	A stuccoed brick house with a slate roof in Gothic style. There are two storeys and three bays, the left bay projecting and having a gable with openwork bargeboards. In the middle bay is a doorway with a four-centred arch, a plain fanlight, and a hood mould. In the left bay is a canted bay window. All the windows are top-hung casements, except for a very small lancet window in the apex of the gable.	II
St Paul's Church, Withington; 53.43255°N 2.22799°W		1841	The church is in red brick with a slate roof, and is in Neo-Norman style. The chancel, chapel and organ chamber were added in 1863. The church consists of a nave, a chancel and a chapel, and west tower embraced by the nave. The tower has three stages, clasping corner pilasters, a round-headed west doorway with shafts, stone bands, a clock face, a corbel table, a plain parapet, and octagonal corner pinnacles with spirelets. Along the sides of the church are pilasters with cornices and pyramidal caps, and between them are round-headed lancet windows. Inside the church is a west gallery.	II
Park House; 53.41072°N 2.22759°W	—	1848	A house, later used for other purposes, it is in stuccoed brick with a slate roof, and is in Gothick style. There are two storeys and a symmetrical front of three bays, the outer bays projecting and gabled. In the centre is an arched doorway with a moulded surround and a fanlight with Y-tracery, and above it is a balustrade of cusped arches. Each of the outer bays contains a canted bay window with a quatrefoil frieze and cast iron cresting, above which is a casement window with a segmental-pointed head, a star-shaped oculus, and ornamental bargeboards.	II
Didsbury Hotel; 53.41032°N 2.23088°W		Mid-19th century	The hotel is in stuccoed brick with a slate roof and has an L-shaped plan. There are two and three storeys, and a front of six bays in two parts. In the right part is a porch, a round-headed doorway and window with a parapet above, a canted bay window to the right, paired round-headed windows on the middle floor, and segmental-headed windows on the top floor, above which is a shallow gable with ornamental bargeboards. The left part has round-headed windows in both floors; all the windows are sashes.	II
Lodge, Didsbury Lodge; 53.41058°N 2.22458°W		Mid-19th century	The lodge is in roughcast brick on a plinth, with a string course, a moulded cornice, and a pyramidal slate roof. It is in Classical style with a square plan, one storey and two bays. In the centre is a rectangular porch with corner pilasters, an entablature, a cornice, a pediment, and a round-headed doorway with a moulded surround and a keystone. The windows are sashes with moulded architraves.	II
Old Chapel Building, Didsbury Campus; 53.41139°N 2.23012°W		Mid-19th century	The chapel has been altered and extended, and used for other purposes. It is in red brick on a sandstone plinth, with sandstone dressings and slate roofs. The building has an E-shaped plan, with a hall linked to flanking receding wings. There are two storeys, the hall is gabled and flanked by octagonal turrets, and on the ground floor are canted bay windows. The linking bays and the wings, which are gabled, contain cross-windows.	II
Walls and gate piers, Didsbury Lodge; 53.41049°N 2.22475°W		Mid-19th century	The walls and gate piers are in sandstone. There are curving dwarf walls, and a central pair of square gate piers with ribbed caps and ball finials buttressed by volutes. There is also an outer pair of short square piers.	II
Oak Bank; 53.42153°N 2.24326°W	—	1851	A pair of semi-detached houses in red and yellow brick with central and corner pilasters, a frieze, a moulded gutter cornice, a slate roof, and a slate-hung left gable. They have a double-depth plan, two storeys, and each house has two bays. In the centre is an iron latticed porch, and above the doors are fanlights. The left house has a two-storey rectangular bay window with casements, and the other windows are sashes with wedge lintels.	II
Withington Hospital (principal administrative block); 53.42741°N 2.24769°W		1854	Originally a workhouse for the Chorlton Poor Law Union, it was extended and converted into a hospital by Thomas Worthington in 1864–66. The hospital closed in 2003 and has been developed for other purposes. It is built in red brick with sandstone dressings and has slate roof. There is a cruciform plan, with two long wings to the north and south, a central chapel protruding to the west and a rear east wing. The chapel is in Italianate style, and has a sandstone main front and a tower with a pyramidal roof. The long wings have three storeys and 18 bays each, with hipped roofs and sash windows. The rear wing has two storeys and ten bays, and contains round-headed windows and sash windows.	II
Entrance lodges, piers, screen and gates, Withington Hospital; 53.42697°N 2.24818°W	—	1854–55	The lodges flank the entrance to the hospital, and are in red brick on a stone plinth, with sandstone dressings, rusticated quoins, a sill band, prominent bracketed eaves, and hipped slate roofs, and they are in Italianate style. Each lodge has a three-storey, one-bay and two two-story one-bay wings with parapets. On the ground floor are three-light windows with an architrave and a cornice. In the centre of the middle floor is a round-arched window with a shell tympanum, stylised voussoirs, and a keystone, and in the outer bays are Venetian windows. There is a two-storey extension to the west lodge. The screens have openwork piers, railings and gates, all in cast iron.	II
The Cedars; 53.41095°N 2.22543°W	—	1857	A house designed by Edward Walters in Italianate style, built in stuccoed brick with a dentilled cornice and a slate roof. It has a U-shaped plan with a main range and two wings to the north. There are two storeys, attics and basements, and an asymmetrical front of three bays. To the left is a square tower with corner pilasters, a cornice, and a balustraded parapet, and to the right is a mansard roof. There are canted bay windows, and most of the windows are sashes.	II
Emmanuel Church; 53.41833°N 2.23302°W	—	1858	The church is in sandstone with green slate roofs, and is in Decorated style. It consists of a nave, north and south aisles, a south transept, a chancel with a south chapel and a north vestry, and a small steeple at the west end of the south aisle. The steeple has an octagonal tower, a continuous arcade of belfry windows, and a spire. The interior of the church was remodelled in 1968.	II
Emmanuel Vicarage; 53.41850°N 2.23333°W	—	c. 1858 (probable)	The vicarage, which was enlarged later in the 19th century, is in red brick with sandstone dressings, and has a green slate roof. It is in Gothic style, with a double-depth plan, two storeys, and an asymmetrical front of three bays. The outer bays have coped gables, the left being the larger, and between is a narrow bay containing a gabled porch. Steps lead up to a doorway with a four-centred arch and a hood mould. The windows are mullioned, they contain cusped tracery, and have hood moulds.	II
Milestone; 53.43180°N 2.22853°W		Mid to late 19th century	The milestone is in whitewashed stone, it stands outside the fire station, and was probably erected by the Manchester and Wilmslow Turnpike Trust. It is triangular with a sloping top and with black lettering. On the top is inscribed "Withington", and on the sides are the distances in miles to Wilmslow and to the centre of St Ann's Square, Manchester.	II
Park End House; 53.41333°N 2.22801°W	—	Mid to late 19th century	A house in red brick on a stone plinth, with sandstone dressings, corner pilasters, bracketed eaves, and a slate roof. There are two storeys and a symmetrical front of five bays, the middle bay protruding slightly. Steps lead up to the central round-headed doorway that has a plain fanlight, prominent imposts and a keystone. The windows are sashes; on the ground floor they have aprons, and in the outer bays the upper floor windows are joined by sill bands.	II
The Towers; 53.40820°N 2.22609°W		1868–1872	Originally a country house designed by Thomas Worthington in the style of a French château, it was later the Shirley Institute. The house is in red brick on a plinth, with sandstone dressings, a band, a parapet, and slate roofs. There are two storeys with cellars and attics, and an asymmetrical front of seven bays with an external kitchen, a gallery, and a square two-stage tower. On the front is a porch with buttresses, a moulded arch, marble shafts, and a balcony with corner tourelles. Most of the windows are cross-windows, and there are dormers with finials, an oriel window with grotesques, a large mullioned and transomed stair window, and a two-storey canted bay window.	II*
Lodge, The Towers; 53.41026°N 2.22581°W		c. 1868–1872	The lodge was designed by Thomas Worthington in French Gothic style. It is in red brick with sandstone dressings and a hipped slate roof. The lodge has 1½ storeys, and an L-shaped plan, formed by a main range and a short wing to the west, with a porch in the angle. The porch has an open arcade, columns with foliated caps, moulded arches, a hood mould, and a parapet. The windows are cross-windows, the window on the upper storey with a gablet. Attached to the lodge is a short wall and a banded gate pier.	II
1 The Grove; 53.41055°N 2.22915°W	—	c. 1870	A house in brown and red brick with dressings in sandstone and red brick and a slate roof. It has a double-depth plan, two storeys and five bays. There are three gables, the central gable smaller, all with applied timber framing, bargeboards, and apex finials. The doorways and windows, which are casements have rectangular stone lintels.	II
3 and 5 The Grove; 53.41070°N 2.22916°W	—	c. 1870	A pair of houses in red and brown brick with a slate roof. They have two storeys and each house has two bays, above which is a gable with applied timber framing, bargeboards, and an apex finial. The doorways and windows have rectangular stone lintels.	II
7 and 9 The Grove; 53.41077°N 2.22900°W	—	c. 1870	A pair of semi-detached houses in brown brick with sandstone dressings, buttressed corners and a slate roof. They have two storeys and each house has two bays, above which is a gable with applied timber framing, bargeboards, and an apex finial. The doorways and windows have rectangular stone lintels, and the windows are horizontally-sliding sashes. The windows above the doors have small balconies with cast iron latticed railings	II
11 and 13 The Grove; 53.41079°N 2.22872°W	—	c. 1870	A pair of houses in red and brown brick with a slate roof. They have two storeys and each house has two bays, above which is a gable with applied timber framing, bargeboards, and an apex finial. The doorways and windows have rectangular stone lintels.	II
15 The Grove; 53.41064°N 2.22865°W	—	c. 1870	A house in brown brick with red brick banding, a cornice, and a slate roof hipped to the right. There are two storeys and an asymmetrical front of five bays that has a gable on the left half with bargeboards and applied timber framing. On the front is a recessed doorway, sash windows on the ground floor, casement windows on the upper floor, and a blind window in the centre.	II
17 The Grove; 53.41051°N 2.22862°W	—	c. 1870	A house in brown brick and some red brick, with sandstone dressings, buttressed corners and a slate roof. There are two storeys and five bays above which is a gable with applied timber framing, bargeboards, and an apex finial. The doorways and windows have rectangular stone lintels.	II
803 and 805 Wilmslow Road; 53.41042°N 2.22927°W	—	c. 1870	A pair of houses in brown brick with dressings in red brick and sandstone and slate roofs. They have seven bays, and mainly have two storeys. The first two bays form a flat-roofed wing, the third bay has a three-storey square-roofed tower, and the other bays have two gables with bargeboards and contain applied timber framing. There is a doorway at the base of the tower, and another doorway to the right with a gabled porch. In front of the upper floor windows in the first two bays is an ornamental cast iron balcony.	II
807 and 809 Wilmslow Road; 53.41035°N 2.22856°W	—	c. 1870 (probable)	A pair of houses in brown brick with dressings in red brick and sandstone and slate roofs. They have eight bays, and mainly have two storeys. The first two bays form a three-storey tower with a canted bay window on the ground floor, single-light windows above, the upper one with a gablet, and a hipped roof. The next three bays have a doorway with a trefoil stone head, casement windows, and a gablet. The right three bays project under a gable with applied timber framing. On the ground floor is a canted bay window with columns supporting the upper floor. On the upper floor is a balcony with cast iron railings.	II
St Paul's Church; 53.41294°N 2.23036°W		1875	A former Methodist church that was converted into an office in 1990. It is in sandstone with a slate roof, and consists of a nave with a gabled clerestory, north and south aisles, a north porch, north and south transepts, a chancel with a north vestry and a south organ house, and a southwest steeple. The steeple has a three-stage tower with diagonal buttresses, a west doorway with a moulded arch, a foliated cornice with pseudo-gargoyles, square corner pinnacles, and a broach spire with lucarnes. There are also buttresses and pinnacles on the transepts.	II
Walls, gate piers and gates, St Paul's Church; 53.41295°N 2.23089°W	—	1875 (probable)	The walls enclose the north and west sides of the churchyard. They are in sandstone and have pitched copings with upstands at intervals. There are two pairs of Gothic gate piers with octagonal spired tops in the west wall and one pair of simpler piers in the north wall. In the south wall are wrought iron Gothic double gates, and in the north wall is a single gate.	II
National Westminster Bank; 53.43485°N 2.22737°W		Late 19th century	The bank is in sandstone on a moulded plinth, with a ballflower and dart frieze, a pierced parapet with upstands and corbelled corner tourelles, and a hipped roof. It is in Jacobean style, and has one storey and six bays. The central entrance has an arched doorway, and a porch with a shaped-gable canopy carried on marble columns with foliated caps, and with an elaborate cartouche. The windows are cross-windows.	II
Entrance gateway of Fletcher Moss Art Gallery; 53.41049°N 2.23111°W		1876	The gateway was originally the doorcase of the Spread Eagle Hotel in Manchester, and was moved to its present site in 1902. It is in sandstone and consists of a round-headed arch that includes shafts with foliate caps, urn finials, and a gable on which is an eagle with outspread wings.	II
139 Barlow Moor Road (Woodstock Arms); 53.42176°N 2.24568°W		1877	A house, later offices, now a public house, in red brick with a red tiled roof. It is in Queen Anne style, with a square plan and a porch at the north. There are two storeys and cellars, a string course, and coved eaves. The entrance front has a stair turret with a doorway, a balcony with wrought iron railings, a canted oriel window, a parapet with a central pediment, and a hipped roof with an upstand. On the east side is a round-headed archway and a small oriel window, and on the south side is a two-storey canted bay window, a parapet, and a shaped gable.	II
Former White Lion public house 53.43338°N 2.22926°W		1881	The former public house is in brick with stone dressings, a cornice on consoles, and a slate roof. It has two storeys, a front of seven bays, a circular corner tower with three bays, and three bays on the left return. On the front is a segmental-headed doorway with shafts, a carved keystone, and a wrought iron balcony above. The ground floor windows have segmental heads and granite shafts, and on the upper floor they have square heads with segmental tympani. Above the doorway is a gabled half-dormer. The tower has four storeys, a balcony, a conical roof with four dormers, and a clock turret with a pyramidal roof.	II
Former town hall, Withington; 53.42586°N 2.23790°W		1881	The former town hall is in buff brick on a plinth of red brick, with dressings in red brick and red terracotta, pilasters, a pierced parapet with urn finials, and a slate roof. It has two storeys at different heights, an entrance block, and a rear block. The entrance block has a symmetrical front of five bays. There is a central round-headed doorway with an architrave including fluted pilasters, rusticated voussoirs, a scrolled keystone, and an enriched pediment on scrolled consoles. The windows are sashes, those on the upper floor with elliptical heads, pilasters and keystones. At the top is a gable containing a roundel and a lettered semicircular band, and behind this is a turret with a pyramidal roof, a square clock, and a swept roof with a flèche and a weathervane. On the returns are shaped gables and pediments.	II
Pair of piers, 494 Wilmslow Road; 53.43352°N 2.22889°W		1881 (probable)	The piers are in stone and stand on a continuous dwarf wall. They are cylindrical with a base and an upper band, chamfered tops, and ball finials. The wall has chamfered angles.	II
Two pairs of piers, 496 Wilmslow Road; 53.43338°N 2.22902°W	—	1881 (probable)	The piers are in stone and each stands on a dwarf wall. They are broad and round, and have chamfered tops, and ball finials.	II
Christ Church, West Didsbury; 53.42353°N 2.25672°W		1881–82	The church is in sandstone, and in Gothic style. It consists of a nave with a clerestory, north and south aisles, a chancel, and a west tower. The tower has three stages, angle buttresses, a west arched doorway, string courses, clock faces, and a plain parapet.	II
St Aidan's Church, Didsbury; 53.42223°N 2.23979°W		1901	Originally a Methodist church, later a United Reformed Church, it is in Accrington brick with terracotta dressings and a slate roof. The church consists of a nave with a west porch, narrow aisles, transepts, and a chancel. At the west end are flying buttresses, and on the roof is a flèche. The windows at the west and on the sides are lancets, and at the east end is a two-light window with Y-tracery.	II
Former Mercantile Bank of Lancashire; 53.42729°N 2.24005°W		1903	The former bank is in red brick on a plinth, with details in yellow brick and terracotta, corner pilasters, a moulded sill band, a frieze with a moulded lettered terracotta panel, a modillioned cornice, a coped parapet, and a hipped red tile roof with crested ridge tiles. It has an L-shaped plan, one storey, four bays on the front and three on the right return. The windows and doorway are round-headed, and form arcades.	II
Cavendish Primary School, annex, wall, gates and railings 53.42848°N 2.24204°W	—	1904–1906	The school has a steel frame, and is built in Ruabon brick, with dressings in buff terracotta, and a blue slate roof. There are two storeys and an H-shaped plan, consisting of a central range of three bays divided by pilaster-buttresses, and projecting two-bay wings with pedimented gables, flanked by square towers with parapets. Over the centre of the middle range is a terracotta semicircular pediment containing the city's coat of arms. In the playground is a detached single-storey annex with a cupola. Along the front is a boundary wall in brick and terracotta with decorative piers and Art Nouveau railings and gates.	II
Rhodes Memorial Clock Tower; 53.41839°N 2.23163°W		1909	A clock tower and drinking fountain built in Portland stone, designed in Edwardian Baroque style, and about 8 metres (26 ft) in height. It stands on two steps and has a base containing two drinking bowls in coved niches. Above this the tower has moulded corners and a bronze plaque with an inscription and a medallion. At the top are clock faces in circular wreaths, a cornice with a segmental arch, and a domed roof with a finial.	II
Church of England Girls' School; 53.41589°N 2.23083°W		1910	The school, designed in Arts and Crafts style, is in red brick with sandstone dressings and red tiled roofs. It has an irregular plan with an entrance range, a hall range to the left, a classroom range at the rear, and a tower in the angle. At the entrance is a round-headed arch with a lettered parapet that is flanked by mullioned windows. In the hall the windows are mullioned and transomed, and in the classroom block are cross-windows. The square tower has a Baroque domed cupola.	II
Didsbury Public Library; 53.41814°N 2.23233°W		1914	The library was built with a grant from Andrew Carnegie, and is in red brick with dressings in Portland stone and slate roofs. It has a triangular plan with an octagonal drum and two wings with a hall between. The drum has a clerestory, coupled corner pilasters, mullioned windows with hood moulds, a sill band, a parapet with upstands, and an octahedral roof that has a finial with a weathervane. At the front is a porch with an embattled parapet and a pyramidal roof, and the wings have mullioned and transomed windows and hipped roofs.	II
Former District Bank (West Didsbury Branch); 53.42568°N 2.23573°W	—	1914	Built for the Manchester & Liverpool District Bank and later used for other purposes, the building is in Tudor Revival style and on a corner site. It is in brick with applied timber framing and rendered panels on the upper floor, and a roof of Westmorland slate. There are two storeys, an L-shaped plan, and jettied gables on both fronts. The windows are mullioned or mullioned and transomed, and there is an oriel window in the left bay on the main front.	II
Nazarene Theological College; 53.41618°N 2.24156°W		1914	A private house, later a college, in pink brick and some timber framing with plaster infill, and a stone-slate roof. It has an H-shaped plan, with a main block and gabled cross-wings. There are two storeys and attics, and the main wing has a front of five bays. In the centre is a two-storey timber-framed gabled porch, the upper storey slightly jettied, and with a transomed ten-light oriel window. The other windows are mullioned casements, and on the roof are small three-light flat-roofed dormers.	II
Garden walls and steps, Nazarene Theological College; 53.41599°N 2.24164°W	—	c. 1914	The walls enclose the terrace to the south and west of the college; they are in pink brick with stone coping. There are stone steps on the south and west sides flanked by ball finials.	II
Didsbury War Memorial; 53.41835°N 2.23193°W		1921	The war memorial stands in a small garden and is in Portland stone. It has a base of three steps, a square two-stage plinth, a pedestal and a shaft carrying a cross fleury. The plinth contains carvings and metal plaques with inscriptions and the names of those lost in both World Wars.	II
Synagogue; 53.42386°N 2.24106°W		1925–1927	The synagogue is in red brick and Portland stone, and has a rectangular plan and two storeys. At the entrance is a stone porch and flanking wings. The porch has pilasters, a cornice, and a parapet, and above the door is a fanlight. Each wing contains a doorway, above which is a round-headed window, a brick cornice and parapet. Behind the porch is a narthex leading to the body of the synagogue. Along the sides are windows, those on the top storey arranged in the fashion of a Venetian window.	II
40 Kingston Road; 53.40827°N 2.22889°W	—	1962–63	A detached house in dark grey engineering brick with a flat roof and a single storey. It has an internal courtyard plan with an integral garage. There is a wide timber door with a slender side panel and fanlights. To the left is a metal screen behind which is a small porch, and to the left of this is a garage door.	II
