= Parrs Wood House =

Listed building in Manchester, England

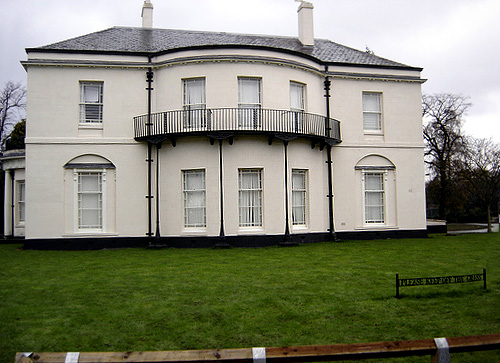
- Parrs Wood House in 2007

- Location within Greater Manchester

General information
- Type: English country house
- Architectural style: Neoclassical
- Location: Parrs Wood, Wilmslow Road, Didsbury, Manchester, England
- Coordinates: 53.4092°N 2.2174°W
- Current tenants: Parrs Wood High School

Technical details
- Floor count: 2

Design and construction
- Designations

Listed Building – Grade II*
- Official name: Parrs Wood House
- Designated: 25 February 1952
- Reference no.: 1254971

Website
- parrswood.manchester.sch.uk

Parrs Wood House is an 18th-century Georgian villa on Wilmslow Road in the Parrs Wood area of Didsbury, Manchester, England. The architect is unknown, though it is believed to have been designed by a member of the Wyatt family. Richard Farrington bought the house in 1795, and his brother, the diarist and artist Joseph Farrington, died there in 1821. From 1825 it was the home of James Heald, a Tory MP and prominent Wesleyan Methodist philanthropist. The estate remained in the family until the 1920s, when it was sold to Manchester Corporation on the condition that it be used for education, later becoming the site of Parrs Wood High School and its Rural Studies Centre. Parrs Wood House was designated a Grade II* listed building in 1952 and later served as the school's music building; it now forms the sixth‑form centre.

== History ==
The architect of the house is unknown, but "it may have been designed by a member of the Wyatt family". Parrs Wood House was bought in 1795 by Richard Farrington, whose brother, the diarist and artist Joseph Farrington, died there after falling down the stairs of the Church of St James, Didsbury, in 1821.

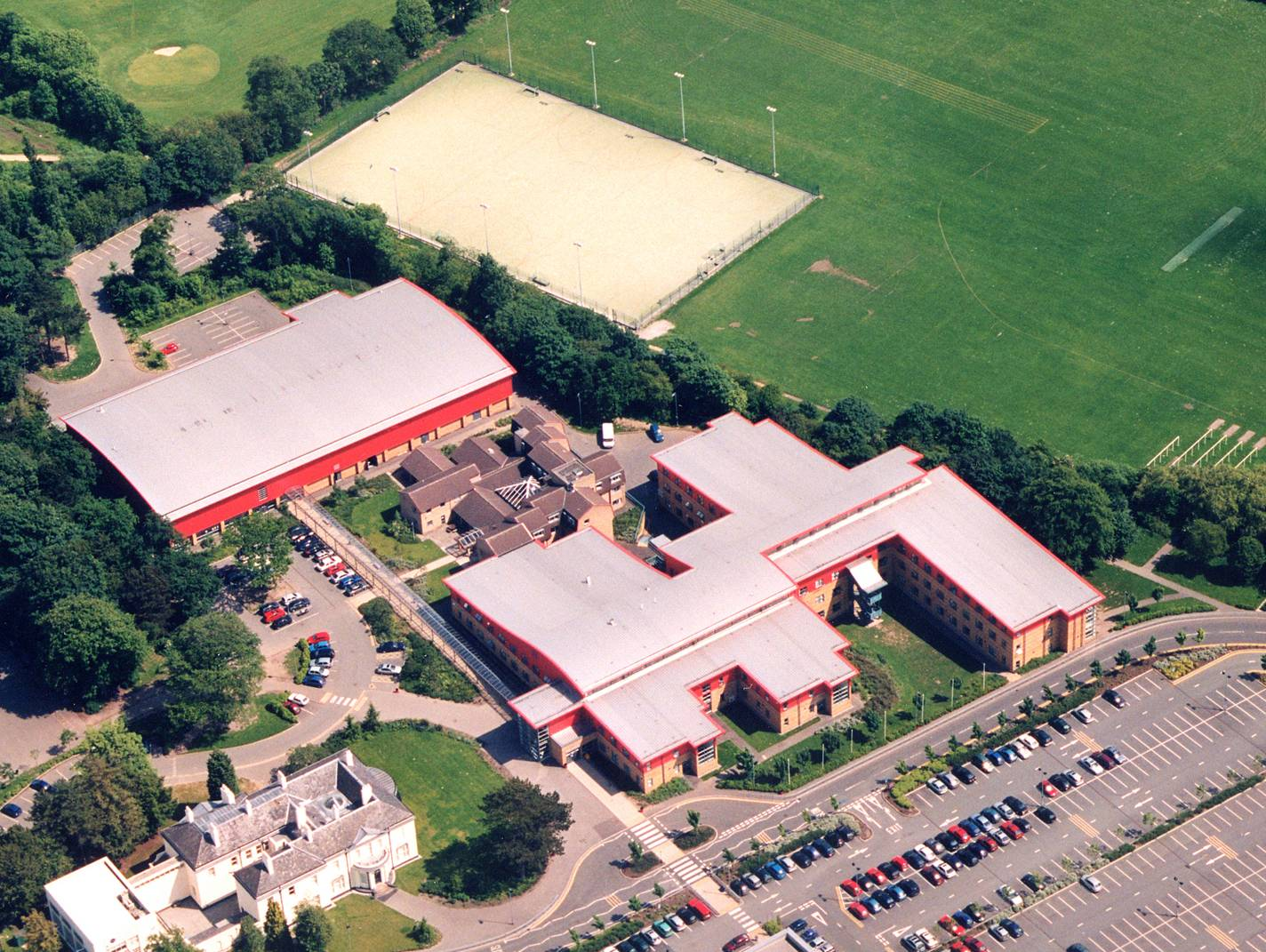
Aerial view of Parrs Wood House (bottom left) and the high school

From 1825, Parrs Wood House was home to the Tory MP James Heald (1796–1873). Heald was a member of the Wesleyan Methodist Church and a prominent philanthropist, supporting a number of charitable causes. He was elected MP for Stockport in 1847 alongside Richard Cobden. Following his death, St Paul's Methodist Church, Didsbury was erected as a memorial to him. James Heald did not marry and had no children. The Parrs Wood estate passed to his nephew after his death, and remained in the family until the 1920s, when it was sold to the Manchester Corporation, on the provision that it would be used for educational purposes. The estate later became the location of Parrs Wood High School and Parrs Wood Rural Studies Centre.

On 25 February 1952, Parrs Wood House was designated a Grade II* listed building.

The mansion was formerly the music building and is now the sixth-form centre of Parrs Wood High School. In 2000 much of the school land was sold to property developers who built a large entertainment complex, changing the area "from a semi-rural educational enclave into a leisure complex". During the redevelopment, Parrs Wood House suffered damage and theft, and the original stables burnt down.

== Architecture ==
The house, described as a "white stucco mansion", has a "square main block with (two) unequal service wings on (the) north side. It is of two storeys and [three] bays [with] a three‑window service range to the left." Its exterior is finished in scored stucco with a hipped slate roof, and the front is arranged around a symmetrical centre. The entrance is marked by a curved porch with timber columns, a decorative frieze and an iron balustrade, leading to a round‑arched doorway with a nine‑panel door and fanlight. The windows throughout are sash windows with margin panes, including large three‑part sashes on the ground floor and a mixture of niches, blind openings and regular sashes above. The left‑hand wing projects slightly and has matching windows and a small porch with a round‑arched doorway. The south front includes a two‑storey bow with a cast‑iron balcony, while the east side has long ranges of windows, a single‑storey bow and a pedimented feature at the north end, along with a later ground‑floor corridor. It was described by Pevsner as "a poorer man's Heaton Hall."

=== Interior ===
Inside, the entrance area has patterned marble flooring and mahogany doors. The main staircase hall is lit by a domed skylight and contains a sweeping staircase supported by columns, with decorative screens and doorways featuring classical reliefs. Several rooms retain ornate plasterwork and notable fireplaces, and an elliptical first‑floor room, formerly richly decorated, has lost much of its plasterwork.

== See also ==
- Grade II* listed buildings in Greater Manchester
- Listed buildings in Manchester-M20
