= Parrs Wood =

Area of Didsbury, in Manchester, England

Coordinates: 53°24′32″N 2°13′08″W

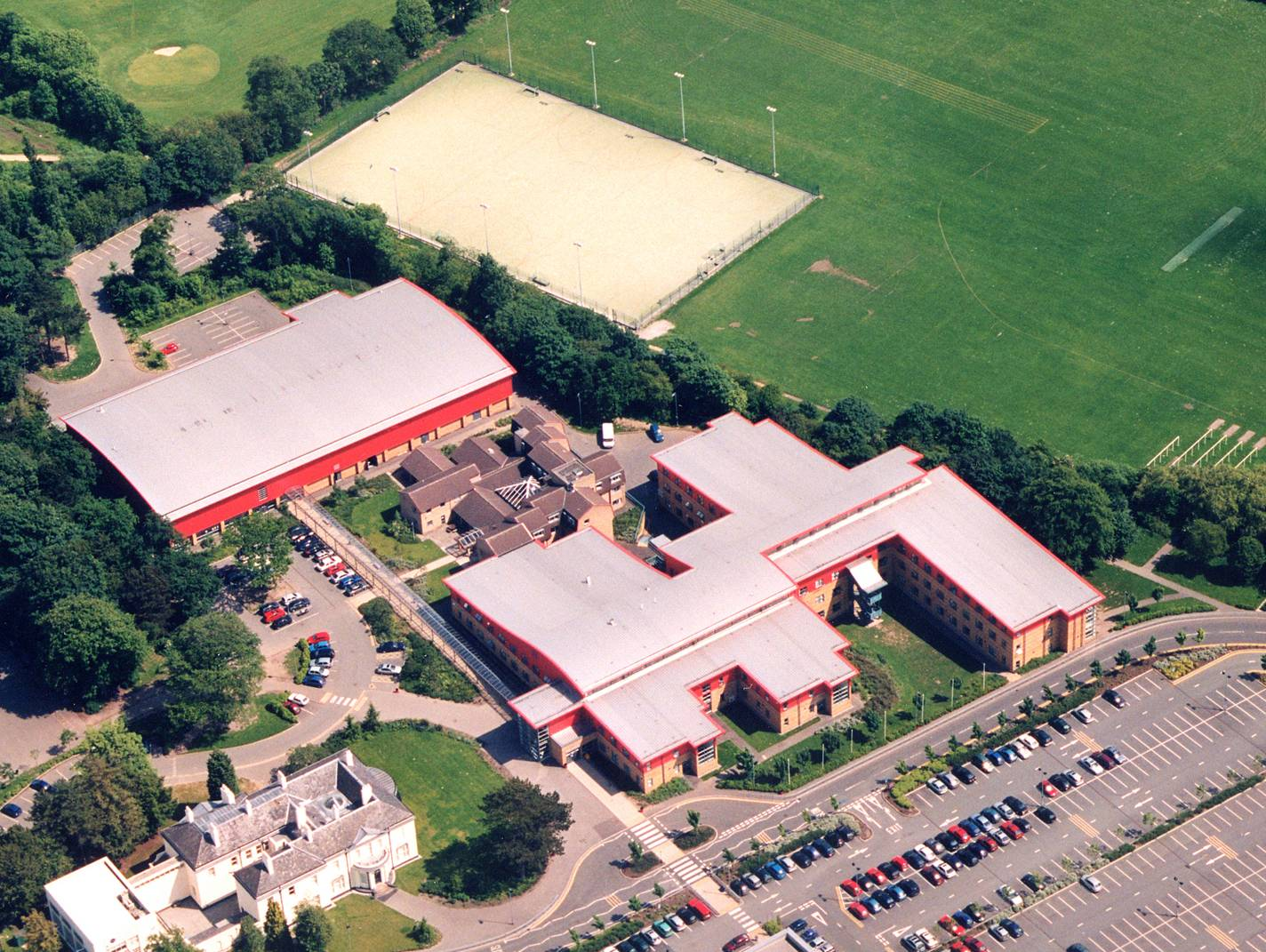
Aerial view of Parrs Wood High School

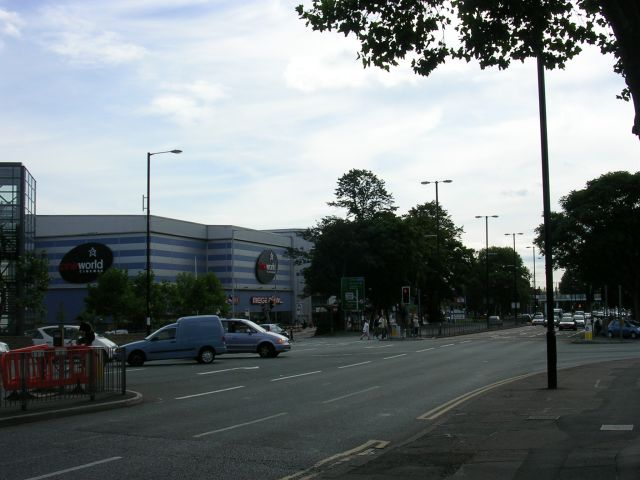
Entrance to Parrs Wood Entertainment Centre

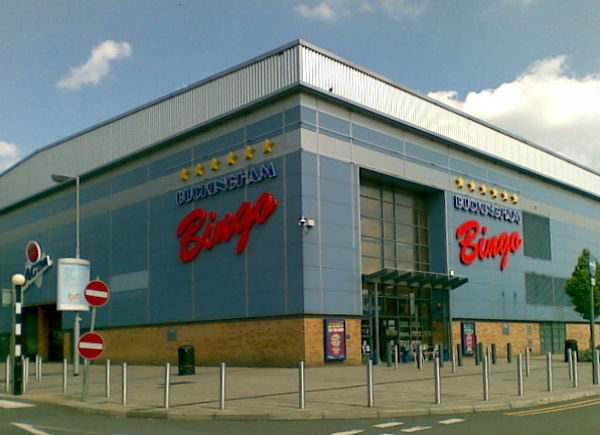
"Buckingham Bingo"

Parrs Wood is an area of East Didsbury, in south Manchester, England.

It was formerly the estate surrounding Parrs Wood House, an 18th-century Georgian villa.

Today the area incorporates part of Wilmslow Road and is home to Parrs Wood High School and Sixth Form Centre, a Tesco supermarket, and Parrs Wood Entertainment Centre.

== Parrs Wood Entertainment Centre ==
Following a deal to build a new school in exchange for land, Parrs Wood Entertainment Centre was completed in 2001. The centre is owned by Land Securities, the largest commercial property company in the UK. Attractions and businesses in the Entertainment Centre include bowling (also includes American pool and arcade area), cinema, restaurants, health club (including a swimming pool), casino and hotel.

== Stores ==
=== Main Units ===
- Cineworld
- Tenpin Ltd
- Nuffield Health
- Grosvenor Casinos

=== Restaurants and Cafés ===
- Nandos
- Wagamama
- Starbucks
- Five Guys

== Transport ==
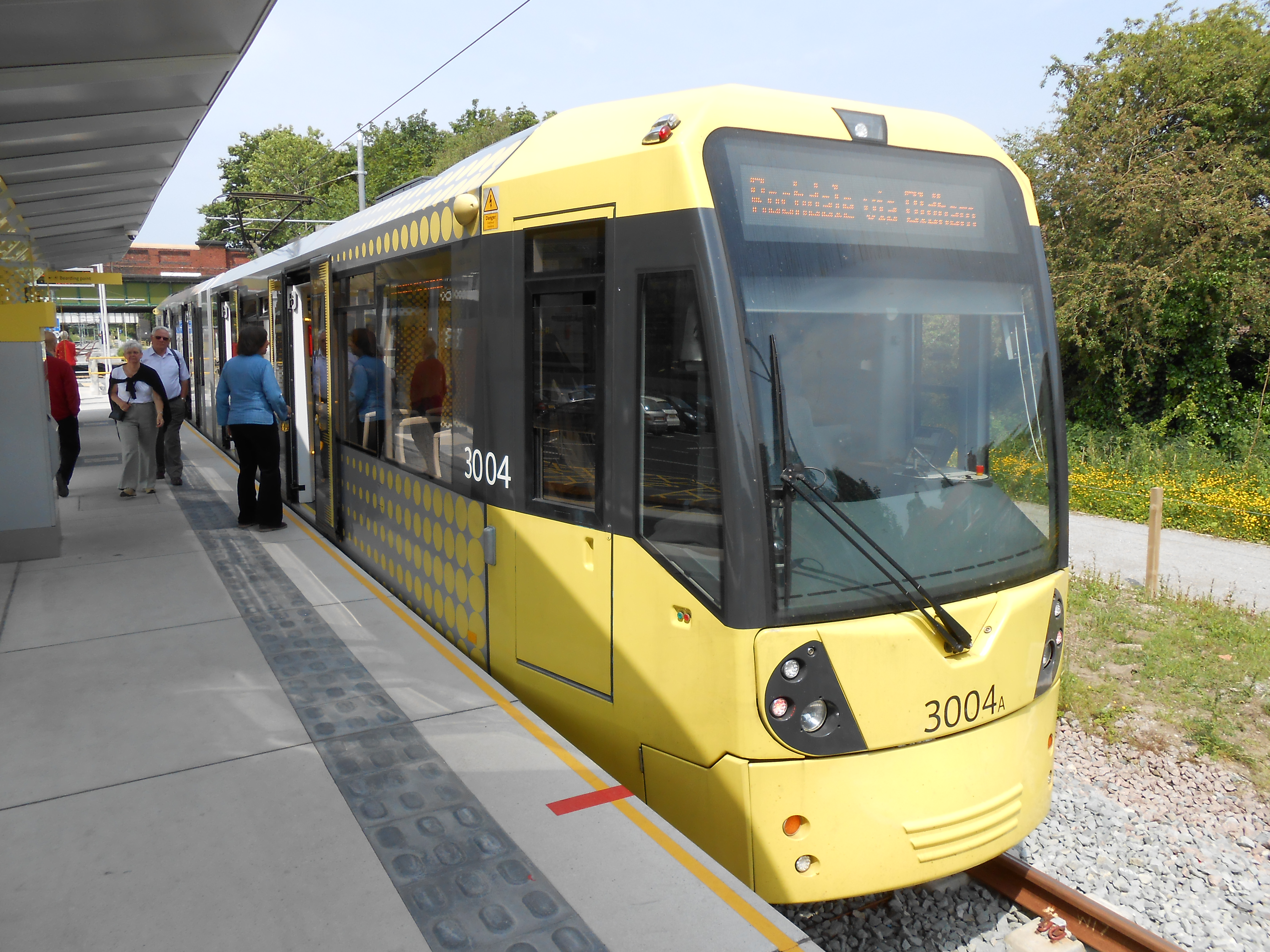
East Didsbury tram stop

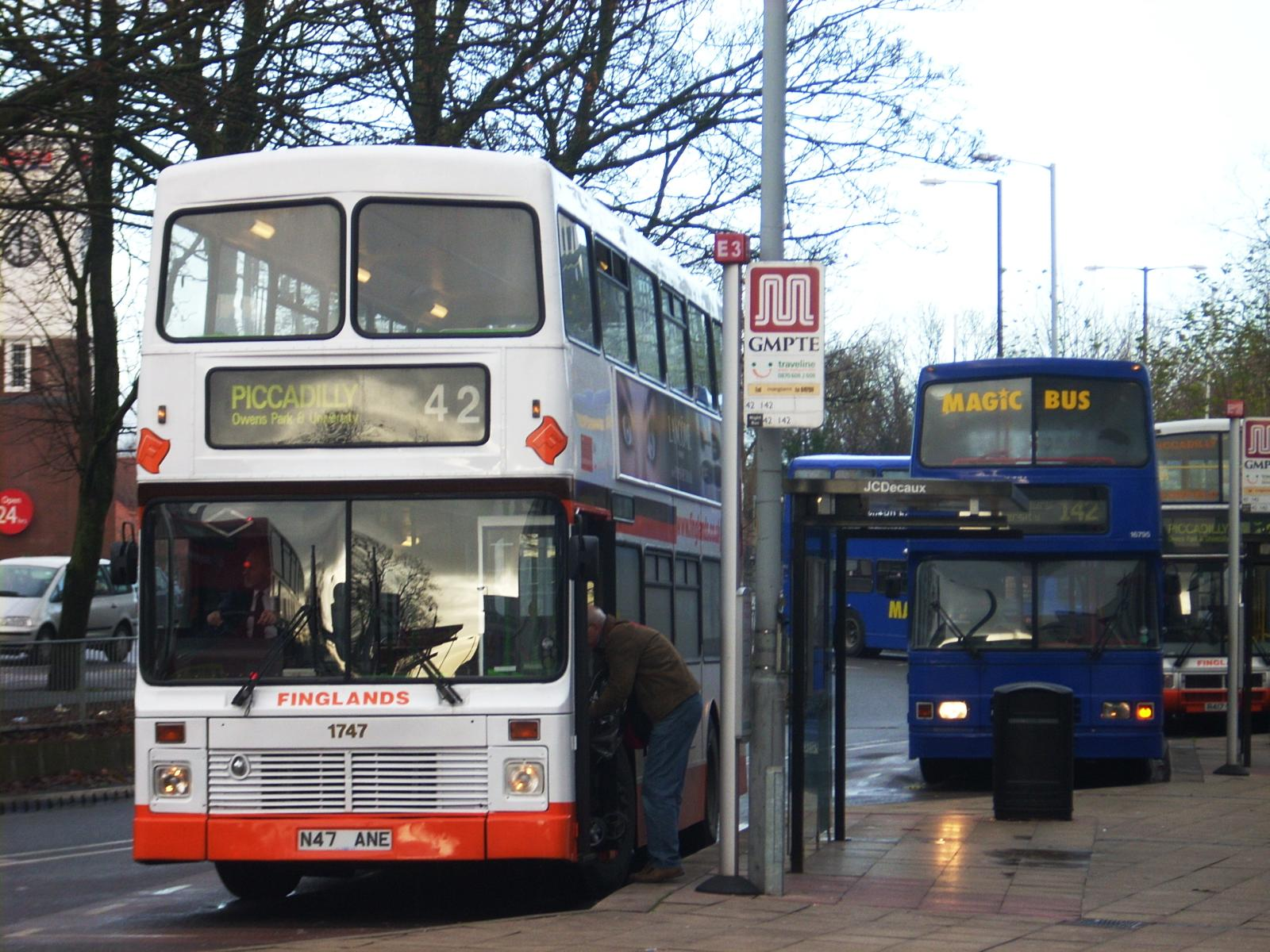
Parrs Wood bus terminal

Parrs Wood is the southern terminus of the Wilmslow Road bus corridor, a busy bus route into central Manchester.

It is also the terminus of the South Manchester Line of the Manchester Metrolink network, at East Didsbury tram stop which is located on the eastern side of Kingsway. East Didsbury railway station is on the opposite side of the road junction, providing trains to Manchester Piccadilly and Manchester Airport.
