= Healdtown =

Healdtown KwaNgwevu Enxukhwebe
- Location within Eastern Cape Location within South Africa
- Coordinates: 32°44′0″S 26°42′15″E
- Country: South Africa
- Province: Eastern Cape
- District: Amathole
- Municipality: Raymond Mhlaba

Area
  - Total: 0.76 km^{2} (0.29 sq mi)

Population (2011)
  - Total: 332
  - Density: 440/km^{2} (1,100/sq mi)

Racial makeup (2011)
  - Black African: 100.0%

First languages (2011)
  - Xhosa: 98.5%
  - Other: 1.5%
- Time zone: UTC+2 (SAST)
- PO box: 5730
- Area code: 046

Healdtown is a hamlet located 10 km north-east of Fort Beaufort in the Eastern Cape province of South Africa. It is situated in Raymond Mhlaba Municipality in Amathole District in an area that was formerly part of the Ciskei. Nelson Mandela completed his schooling in Matric here.

There was a Methodist mission station 10 km north-east of Fort Beaufort and 15 km north-west of Alice. Established in 1853 by minister John Ayliff and named after the treasurer of the Wesleyan Methodist Missionary Society, James Heald, who had contributed towards a training institution for teachers, founded there in 1867.
