= St Paul's Methodist Church, Didsbury =

St Paul's Didsbury
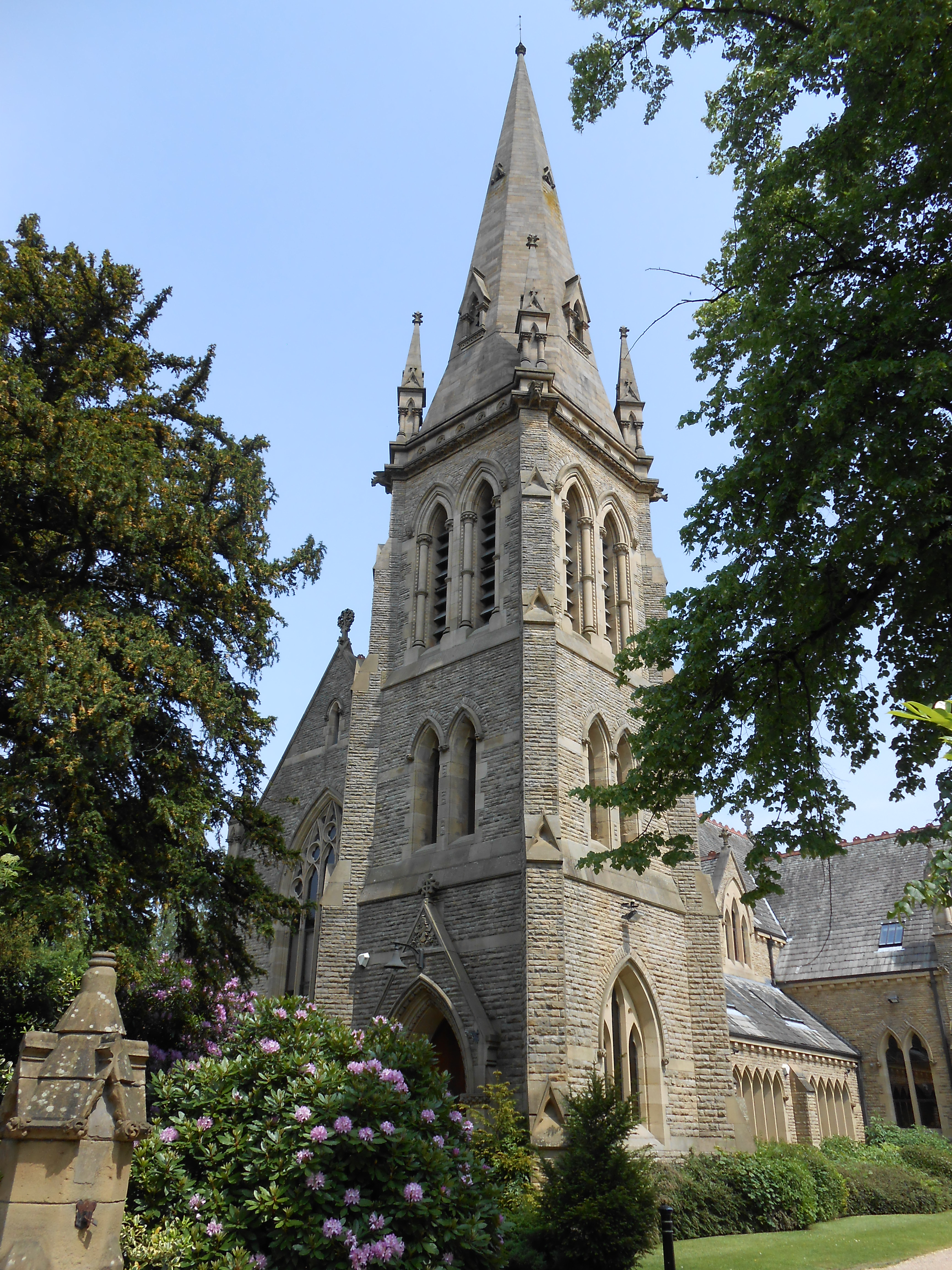
- The spire of St Paul's Didsbury

- Location of St Paul's in Greater Manchester
- 53.4130059°N 2.230219°W
- OS grid reference: SJ 84785 90704
- Location: 781 Wilmslow Road, Manchester M20 2RW
- Country: England
- Denomination: Former Methodist Church

History
- Former name(s): St Paul's Methodist Church, Didsbury
- Status: Former church
- Founded: 1877
- Dedication: St. Paul the Apostle
- Events: 1990: converted to office space

Architecture
- Functional status: Office conversion
- Heritage designation: Grade II
- Designated: 3 October 1974
- Architect: H.H. Vale
- Style: Gothic Revival
- Groundbreaking: 1875
- Completed: 1877
- Construction cost: £20,000
- Closed: 1987

Specifications
- Materials: Sandstone

Administration
- District: Manchester and Stockport District

St Paul's Methodist Church is a former Methodist church in the Manchester suburb of Didsbury. The building was designed by the architect H.H. Vale as a church for the nearby Wesleyan Theological Institution and opened in 1877. The building was converted into an office space in 1990. It is recorded in the National Heritage List for England as a designated Grade II listed building.

== History ==
St Paul's Church was built as a memorial to the local philanthropist and MP, James Heald of Parrs Wood. It was designed by the Liverpudlian architect H.H. Vale, who at the time was also collaborating with Cornelius Sherlock on the design of the Walker Art Gallery in Liverpool. During the project, Vale committed suicide, and the church was completed by T D Barry & Sons. Construction lasted from 1875 to 1877.

== Architecture ==
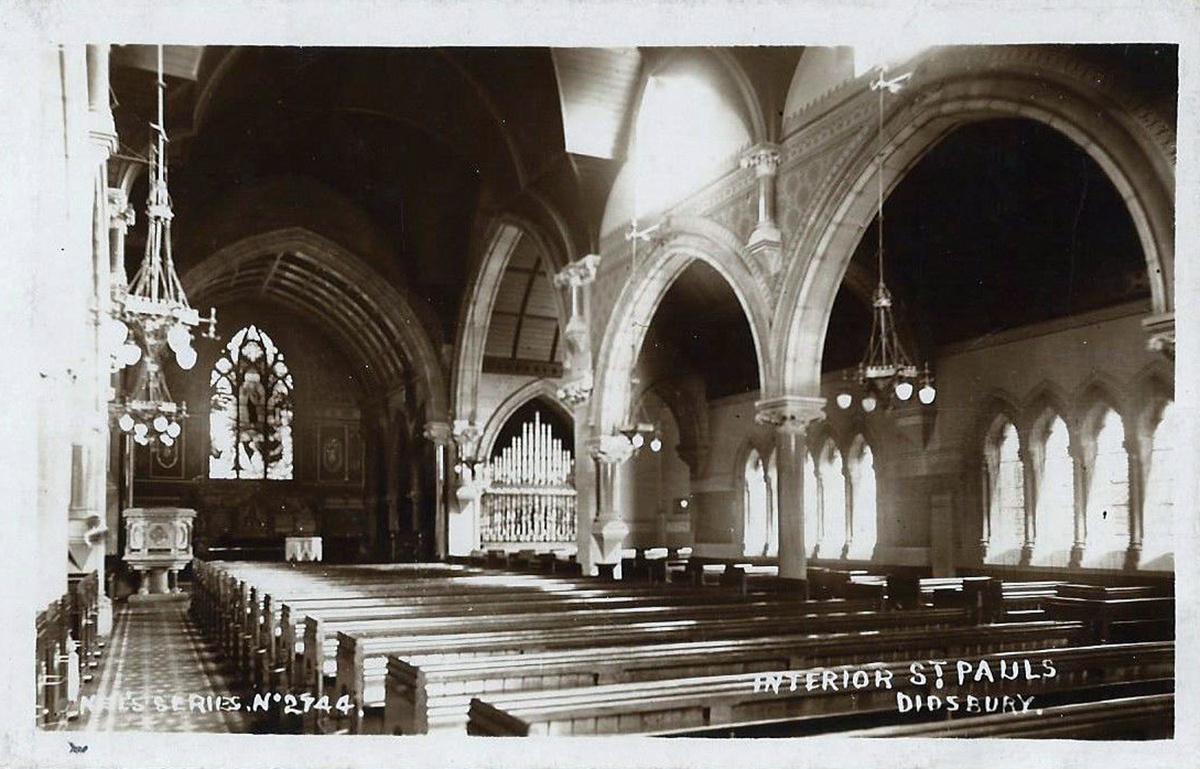
The original interior of St Paul's Church

Built in the Victorian Gothic style, Vale's church displays freely interpreted elements of Early English and Geometrical Decorated Gothic architecture. The layout is cruciform with a belfry and steeple on the south-west corner. The stonework is sandstone and architectural elements typical of the style are used throughout, such as lancet windows and foliar decoration, with dormer windows along the nave.

The interior is noted for its arcades of polished Aberdeen granite and Irish marble columns with carved capitals, encaustic tiled floors, a painted panelled barrel roof, richly carved stonework which features fruit and foliage inhabited with animals and birds, a stone pulpit resting on granite shafts, a baptismal font of Caen stone and a marble reredos. The interior walls are of Hollington stone. The church also includes several wall monuments to "tutors of this college".

The office conversion, which was carried out by the firm Downs & Variava in 1990, has been criticised favourably; the insertion of mezzanine floors is regarded as sympathetic to the spacious interior by the retention of the area under the crossing to roof height.

== Modern use ==
The building is occupied today by a pipeline simulation & leak detection company, Atmos International, which aims at preserving the building and its heritage.

== Present-day church ==
Although the Victorian church building was put to secular use, Christian worship continued for some years on the site. The congregations of St Paul's and the nearby Albert Hill Street Methodist Chapel merged to form Didsbury Methodist Church, occupying the small neighbouring brick building dating from 1961. In 2023 Didsbury Methodist Church closed and the congregation merged with East Didsbury Methodist Church on Parrs Wood Road to form United Didsbury Methodist Church.

== See also ==
- Grade II listed buildings in Manchester

== Bibliography ==
- Hartwell, Clare; Hyde, Matthew; Pevsner, Nikolaus (2004). Lancashire: Manchester and the South-East. Yale University Press. p. 443. ISBN 0300105835.
