= White Lion, Withington =

Listed former pub in Manchester, England

White Lion
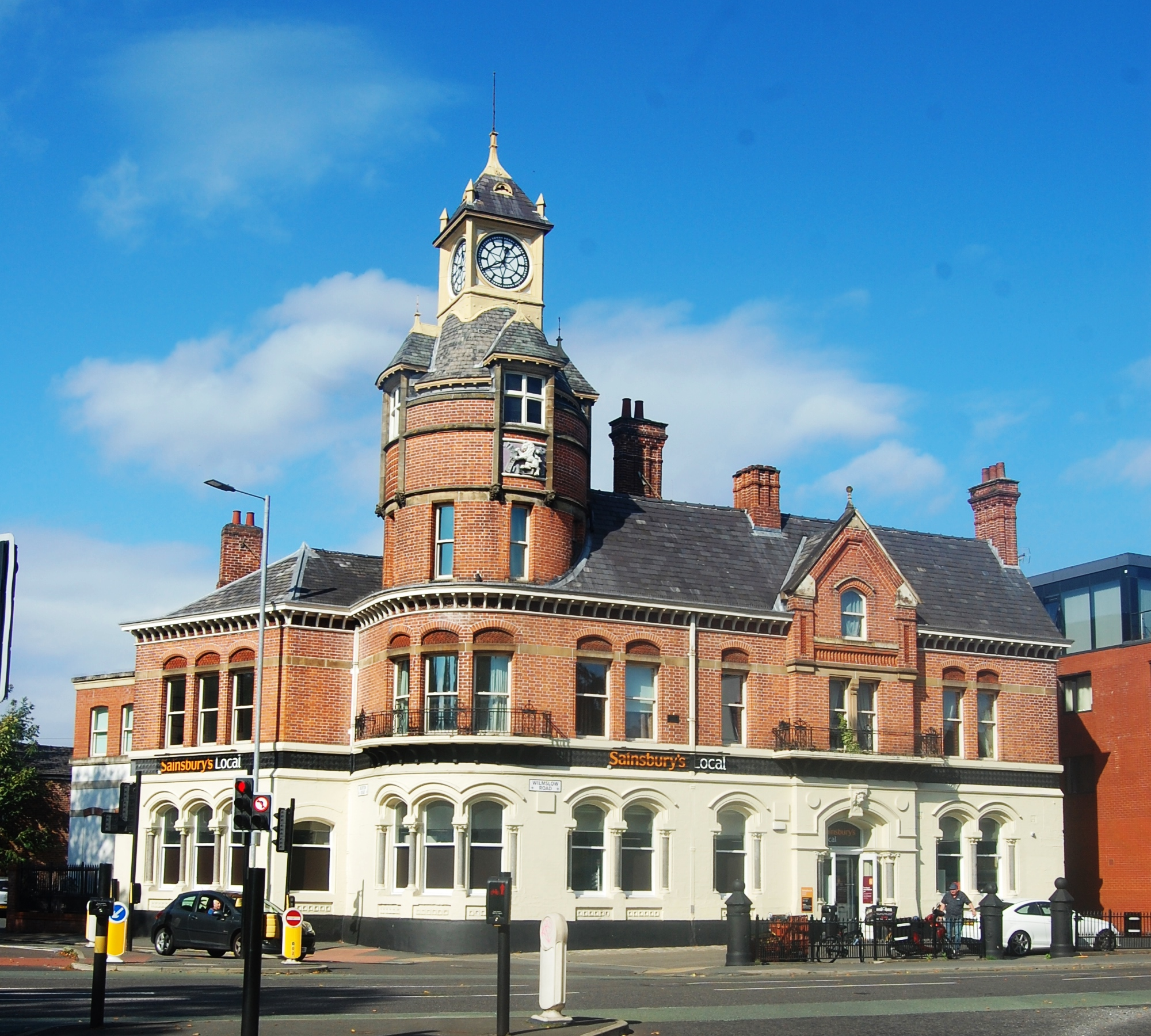
- The building in 2021

- Location within Greater Manchester
- Former names: Withington Ale House

General information
- Status: Converted to retail and residential use
- Type: Public house (1881–2005); Vacant (2005–2011); Retail and residential (2011–present)
- Architectural style: Eclectic Gothic
- Location: 496 Wilmslow Road, Withington, Manchester, England
- Coordinates: 53.4335°N 2.2293°W
- Year built: 1881; 145 years ago
- Renovated: c. 2011 (converted)

Design and construction
- Architect: William Mellor
- Designations

Listed Building – Grade II
- Official name: Former White Lion public house
- Designated: 20 June 1988
- Reference no.: 1255026

The White Lion is a Grade II listed former public house on Wilmslow Road in Withington, a suburb of Manchester, England. Designed by the architect William Mellor in the Eclectic Gothic style and built in 1881, it operated as a tied house and remained in use until its closure in 2005. The building was subsequently converted for retail use, with the upper floors adapted as apartments, and reopened as a Sainsbury's Local in 2011.

== History ==
The White Lion was designed in 1880 by the architect William Mellor, who died in October that year, and therefore did not live to see the building completed in 1881. It formed part of the late‑Victorian development of Withington along Wilmslow Road and occupied a prominent corner site at the junction with Burton Road.

The building is shown on 1890s and 1920s Ordnance Survey maps as a hotel and a public house, respectively; however, there is no indication that the White Lion ever operated as a hotel. In 1904 the property became part of the Wilsons Brewery estate when the company absorbed Kay & Whittaker's Brewery.

On 20 June 1988, the building was designated a Grade II listed structure. In its later years the pub traded as the Withington Ale House. It closed in 2005, and in 2007 the building was sold to Symbol Developments, a residential developer. In September 2008, alongside a listed building consent application, a related proposal sought permission for a three‑storey extension linked to the existing structure by a two‑storey block, the creation of 11 self‑contained flats on the upper floors, and the subdivision of the ground floor to accommodate two bar units. The application was later closed without a decision.

A second proposal was submitted in June 2010 seeking to create a retail unit at ground‑floor and basement level, convert the first and second floors into six apartments, and add a two‑storey rear extension facing Burton Road following demolition of an existing extension. The scheme also included 18 parking spaces, associated landscaping, internal works to facilitate the change of use, and the repair and repainting of stone columns and railings under listed building consent, with planning officers requesting further negotiation on opening hours and the restoration of the clock. The application was approved in September 2010, and the building was subsequently converted. It reopened for retail use as a Sainsbury's Local in 2011.

== Architecture ==
The building is constructed of brick, with the lower level painted, and has stone detailing and a tiled roof. It occupies an angled corner plot and has an uneven layout, marked by a rounded tower at the corner. The design mixes elements from different styles with a broadly Gothic character.

It has two main floors arranged in seven bays, with an additional four-storey tower. The entrance sits in the third bay and has a shallow arched head with decorative stonework and a small iron balcony above it. The ground-floor windows are also shallow‑arched and rest on granite shafts, while the upper-floor windows are rectangular with shaped panels above them. A deep, bracketed cornice runs across the front and includes terracotta floral decoration, and there is a half‑dormer above the third bay.

The tower rises above the corner and includes another iron balcony at first-floor level and a small clock turret with a steep roof. The chimneys are shaped for effect. The corner elevation and the left‑hand return each have three bays and continue the same treatment and detailing.

== See also ==
- Listed buildings in Manchester-M20
- Listed pubs in Greater Manchester
