= Adam O'Riordan =

English writer (born 1982)

- Born: Adam Gordon O'Riordan; 1982 (age 43–44); Manchester, England
- Education: University of Oxford; Royal Holloway, University of London

Adam Gordon O'Riordan (born 1982) is an English writer.

He has published in a variety of genres, including poetry, novels and short fiction. His first collection of poems In the Flesh won the Somerset Maugham Prize. His other titles include: A Herring Famine (poetry), The Burning Ground (stories) and The Falling Thread (novel).

O'Riordan is a frequent contributor to the UK press, and has written for the Times Literary Supplement, the Financial Times and the Guardian among others. He has taught creative writing at Manchester Writing School for more than a decade.

== Early life ==
O'Riordan was born and raised in Manchester to GMB trade unionist parents of Scottish and Irish descent. His maternal family were from Aberdeen, while his paternal family were from Fife and Cork.

O'Riordan attended Parrs Wood High School. He graduated from Oxford University, and then obtained a Master of Arts (MA) and a PhD from Royal Holloway, University of London, under the supervision of Andrew Motion.

== Bibliography ==
=== Poetry collections ===
- In the Flesh (2010)
- When Love Speaks (2011)
- The Herring Famine (2017)

=== Short story collections ===
- The Burning Ground (2017)

=== Novels ===
- The Falling Thread (2021)
