= Ye Olde Cock Inn =

Listed pub in Manchester, England

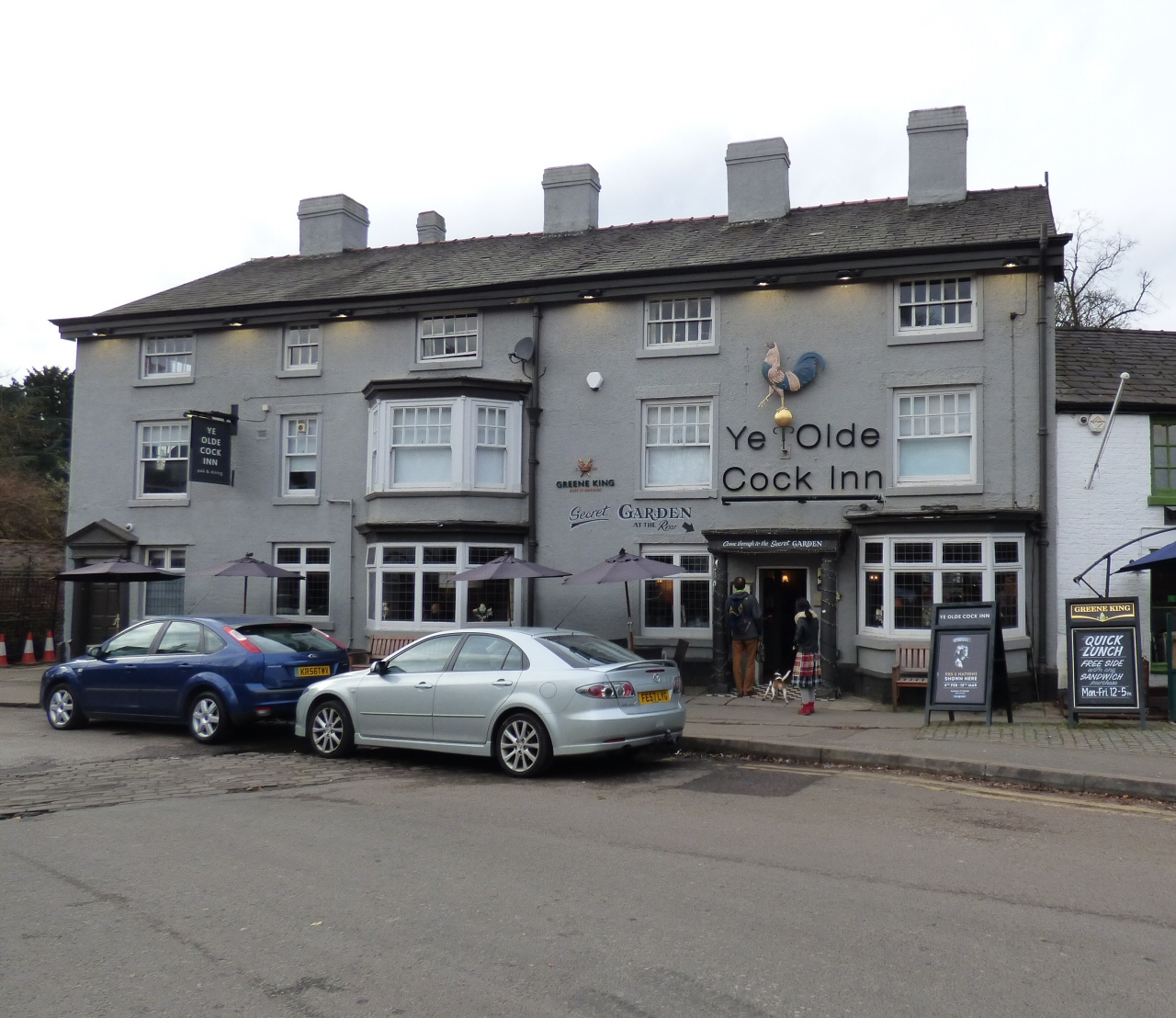
- The pub in 2017

- Location within Greater Manchester

General information
- Type: Public house
- Location: 848 Wilmslow Road, Didsbury, Manchester, England
- Coordinates: 53.4107°N 2.2311°W
- Year built: Late 18th century

Design and construction
- Designations

Listed Building – Grade II
- Official name: Ye Olde Cock Inn
- Designated: 3 October 1974
- Reference no.: 1254964

Website
- Official website

Ye Olde Cock Inn is a Grade II listed public house on Wilmslow Road in Didsbury, a suburb of Manchester, England. Built in the late 18th century as an inn, it has had varied uses, including a period as a seafood restaurant, before being returned to pub‑restaurant use by Greene King in 2011.

== History ==
The present building was constructed in the late 18th century on the site of a 16th‑century structure known as The Cock.

On 3 October 1974, the pub was designated a Grade II listed building. It later operated as a Loch Fyne fish restaurant before being returned to pub‑restaurant use by owners Greene King in June 2011.

== Architecture ==
The building has roughcast walls over brick and a green slate roof. It has a long, rectangular shape with additional sections at the back. The front is three storeys with five windows across, and there are two entrances: one at the far left with a decorative surround, and another between the fourth and fifth windows with a small flat‑roofed porch supported by two columns.

A two‑storey bay window sits slightly left of centre, with modern four‑pane windows on the ground floor and three sash windows above. There is also a single‑storey bay window at the right end, along with two modern cross‑windows. Most first‑floor windows are sashes with glazing bars only in the top half, and the second‑floor windows are shallow sashes with a single row of panes. A moulded wooden cornice runs below the gutter, and there are four chimneys along the roof ridge. The rear, which is not rendered, includes several sash windows.

== See also ==
- Listed buildings in Manchester-M20
- Listed pubs in Greater Manchester
