= James Heald =

English philanthropist and politician

James Heald (1 March 1796 – 26 October 1873) was a Manchester banker, evangelical Methodist philanthropist, and single-term Member of Parliament, representing Stockport as a Peelite free trade Conservative from 1847 to 1852.

Born in Brinnington, near Stockport, Heald was brought up as a Methodist, but considered becoming an Anglican clergyman. Instead, he joined his father's calico printing business, later moving to Parrs Wood House. He led the foundation of a northern branch of the Theological Institution in Didsbury.

Heald became a magistrate for both Lancashire and Cheshire, and also served as a deputy lieutenant of Cheshire. He stood in Stockport for the Conservative Party at the 1847 UK general election, winning a seat. Unusually for a Conservative, he supported free trade. He was opposed to Catholic clergy receiving endowments.

Heald contested Stockport again at the 1852 UK general election, but was defeated. He then contested the December 1852 by-election in Oldham, but was again unsuccessful. From 1861 until his death, he was the treasurer of the Wesleyan Methodist Missionary Society. St Paul's Methodist Church, Didsbury was built in his memory. Healdtown in South Africa is also named after him.

Parliament of the United Kingdom
Preceded by Henry Marsland; Richard Cobden	Member of Parliament for Stockport; 1847–1852; With: Richard Cobden (1847); James Kershaw (1847–1852)	Succeeded by James Kershaw; John Benjamin Smith
