= Didsbury Campus =

Redeveloped former university campus in England

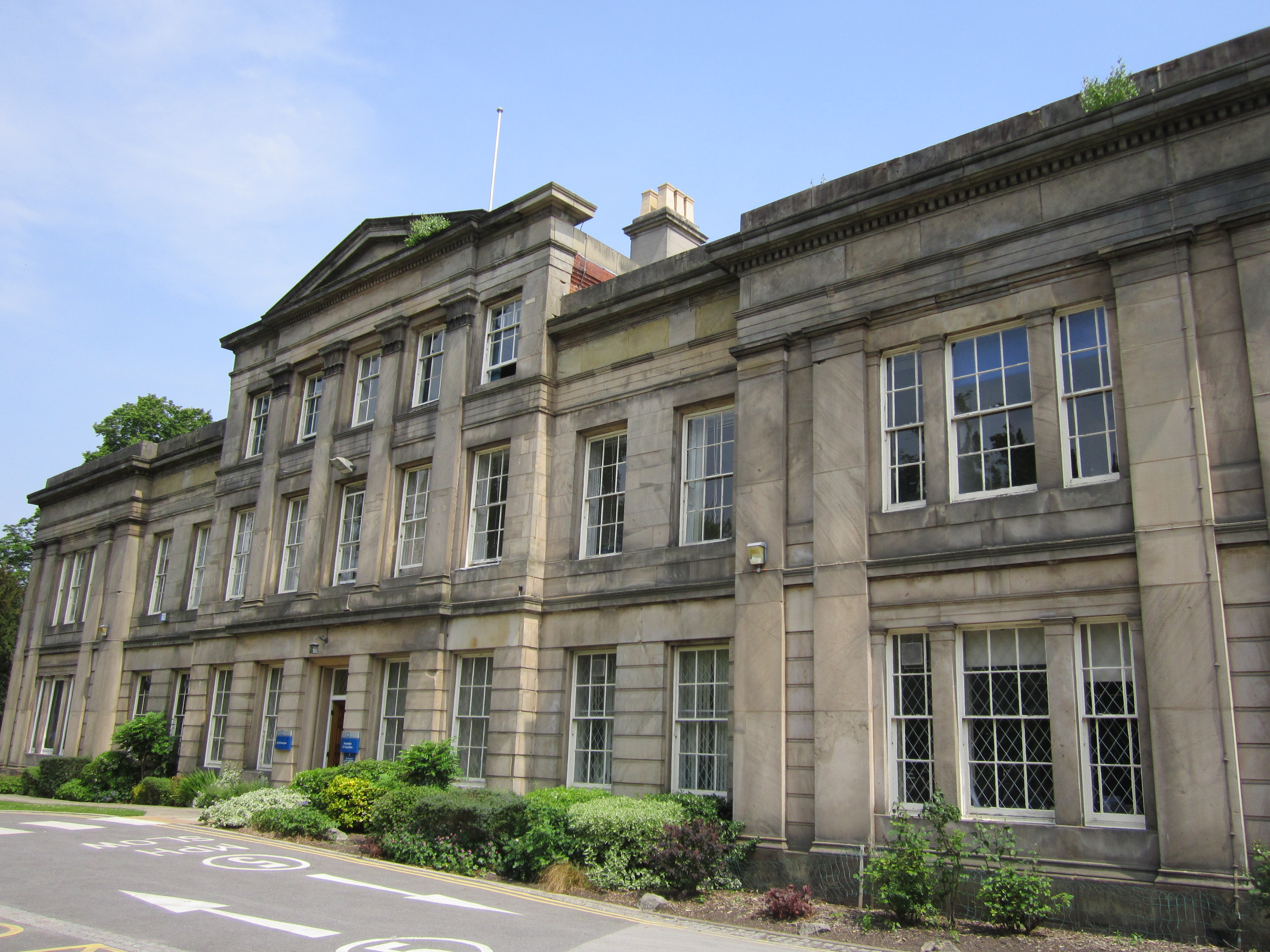
- The administration building on Didsbury Campus
- Interactive map of the Didsbury Campus area

General information
- Architectural style: Neoclassical
- Location: Wilmslow Road, Didsbury, Manchester, England
- Coordinates: 53.4120°N 2.2302°W
- Year built: 1785, 1842
- Client: Wesleyan Methodist Church
- Governing body: Privately owned

Design and construction
- Architect: Richard Lane
- Designations

Listed Building – Grade II*
- Official name: Administration Building at Didsbury Campus, Manchester Metropolitan University
- Designated: 25 February 1952
- Reference no.: 1254970

Listed Building – Grade II
- Official name: Old Chapel Building at Didsbury Campus, Manchester Metropolitan University
- Designated: 6 June 1994
- Reference no.: 1270548

The Didsbury Campus on Wilmslow Road in Didsbury, a suburb of Manchester, England, was originally a private estate before becoming part of Manchester Metropolitan University; the oldest building on the site dates to around 1785. It became a theological college for the Wesleyan Methodist Church in 1842, about the same time as a chapel—later incorporated into the college—was built. These buildings are now listed.

In 1946 in response to a growing need for new teachers across the country, the site became a temporary teacher training college, becoming permanent in 1950. Over the next 30 years there was a significant building programme, with classrooms, lecture theatres, offices, sports facilities and a library all constructed. The college became a part of Manchester Polytechnic (later Manchester Metropolitan University) in 1977. In 2005 the campus became home to the Science Learning Centre North West.

The university closed the campus in 2014, sold the land to developers, and moved its facilities to a new purpose-built campus named Birley Fields in Hulme. All the buildings constructed after the Second World War were then demolished, with only the listed buildings remaining. As of 2018 these are being converted into homes as part of the site's redevelopment as a residential area.

== History ==
=== Early history: 1465–1946 ===
According to local historian Diana Leitch, the site has been in use since 1465; the first house was built in 1603 as part of a large estate with a deer park. In 1740 the site was purchased by the Broome family, and a new house was constructed after 1785 by William Broome, extant today as the front part of the university's former administration building, now known as Sandhurst House. By 1812 the house was occupied by a Colonel Parker, and in the 1820s and 1830s it was a girls' school. The site was purchased by the Wesleyan Methodist Church on 18 March 1841 for £2,000, and opened as a theological college on 22 September 1842 with a special service. The construction and later renovations were paid for from a centenary fund, an initiative started ten years previously by the Methodist scholar Adam Clarke.

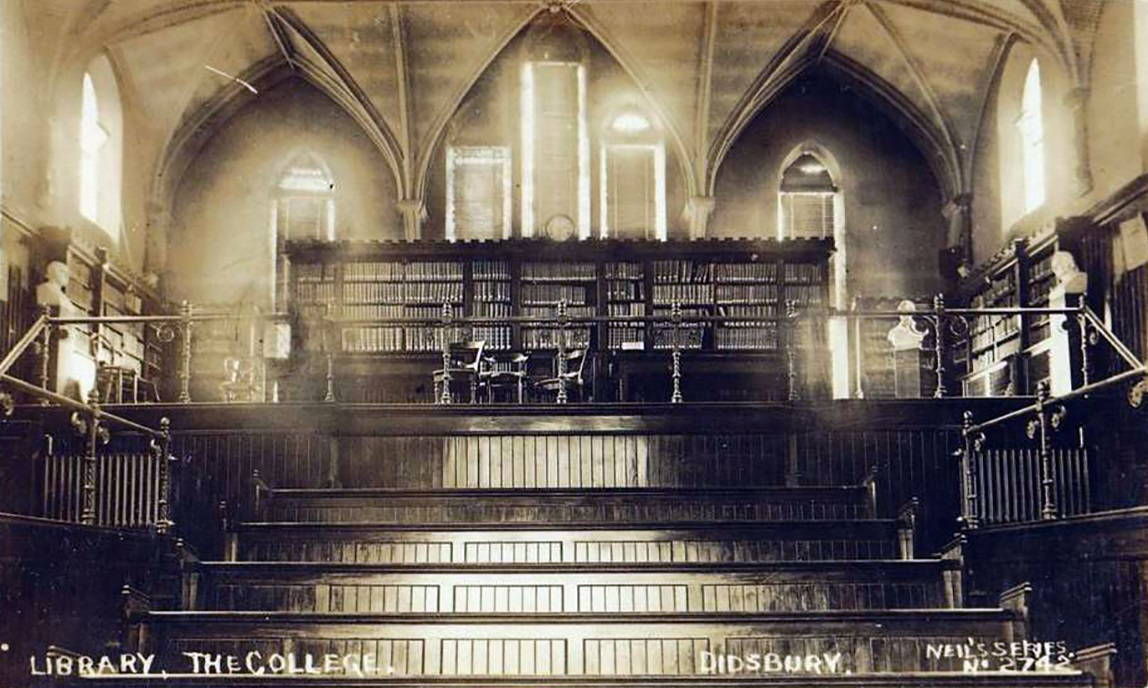
The interior of the original college library in 1911. It was previously the chapel, known as the Old Chapel.

To the south of the main house, the Methodist owners constructed a chapel that could hold 300 worshippers, along with accommodation for staff. This was later dubbed the Old Pump House. In 1866 the main house was extended by the addition of two wings and a back to form a quadrangle, and the front was reclad in Kerridge stone. In 1877 a new church was built to serve the college, the large Victorian Gothic St Paul's Methodist Church, on an adjacent site, and the chapel became the college library and lecture theatre. By the end of the 19th century, Didsbury had become a branch of a national Wesleyan Theological Institution, along with Wesley College, Headingley, in Leeds and Handsworth College in Birmingham. The first president of the Institute was Jabez Bunting; John Hannah was among the first tutors.

During both world wars the site was used as a military hospital, with up to 200 beds and more than 5,000 patients receiving treatment between 1941 and 1945. In 1943 the Board of Education had begun to consider the future of education, following reforms that would inevitably come after the war ended. It was estimated that with the raising of the school leaving age, following the Education Act 1944, about 70,000 new teachers would be needed annually, almost ten times as many as before the war. In 1944 a report was produced by the Board of Education on the emergency recruitment and training of teachers, and it was decided that there were to be several new training colleges set up. These colleges were to be staffed by lecturers seconded from local authorities, with mature students selected from National Service conscripts. In 1945 the theological college, which was no longer required by the Wesleyans, was leased to the Manchester Education Authority. The new emergency training college was officially opened on 31 January 1946, with Alfred Body as its first principal.

=== Didsbury College of Education: 1946–1977 ===
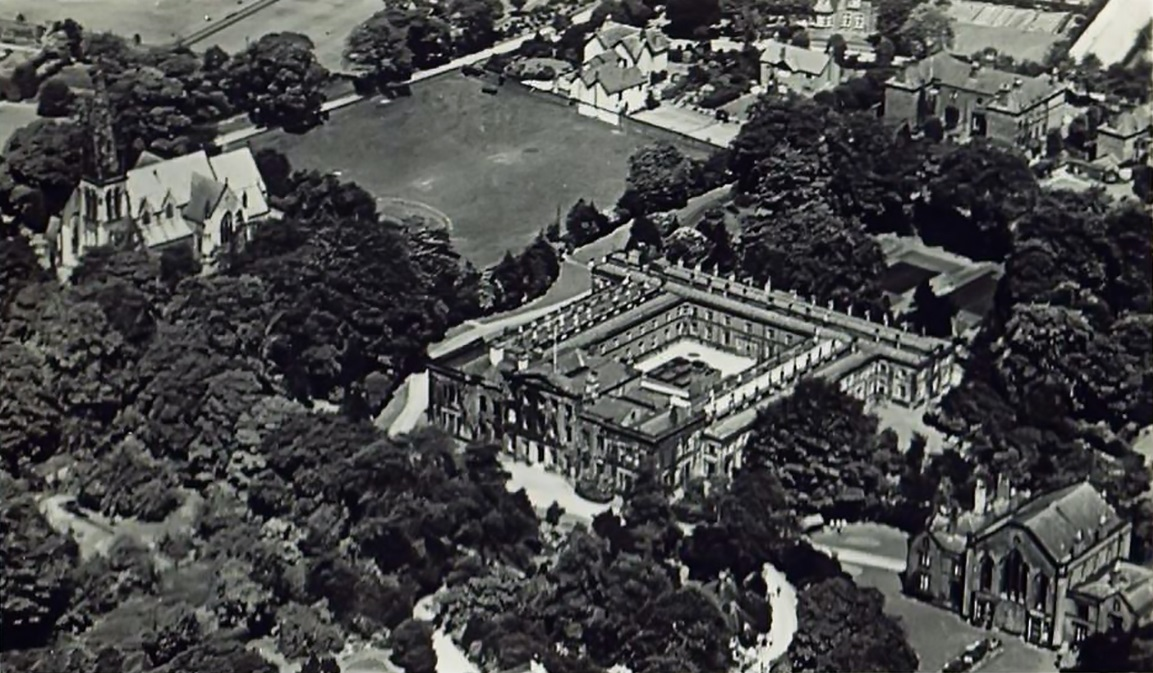
An aerial view of Didsbury College, 1950. The centre building is the original house, the old chapel building is at the bottom right, and St Paul's Methodist Church is at the top left.

The college faced some difficulties initially, as the building which had accommodated 70 students previously now needed space for 224, including 140 living on site. In the first four years, renovations by the Ministry of Works included the removal of 60 chimney stacks, a new roof, new wiring and central heating. Many lectures took place away from the site in various schools and other buildings nearby, and temporary huts – which would become permanent – were constructed in 1947. The first students were all ex-service men who had been interviewed by boards established by the Ministry of Education; they completed a 2-year course over a period of just 13 months. The second cohort of 242 men completed their course in a similar amount of time. Didsbury became co-educational in 1948, with 158 female and 106 male students enrolling. There was some uncertainty about what was to become of the college once the emergency scheme ended; the Methodists, who still owned the building, had moved to Bristol. The University of Manchester had expressed an interest in using the site as student accommodation, and the Methodists also wished to set up a training college. In the end, by 1950, the emergency college was purchased by the City of Manchester and made permanent as Didsbury Teacher Training College, with an initial enrolment of about 250 male and female students. As a result of becoming a permanent college, Didsbury became part of Manchester University's School of Education. In 1956 Lord and Lady Simon of Wythenshawe granted the college 5.5 acres (22,000 m^{2}) of land on the opposite side of Wilmslow Road, allowing sports days to be held.

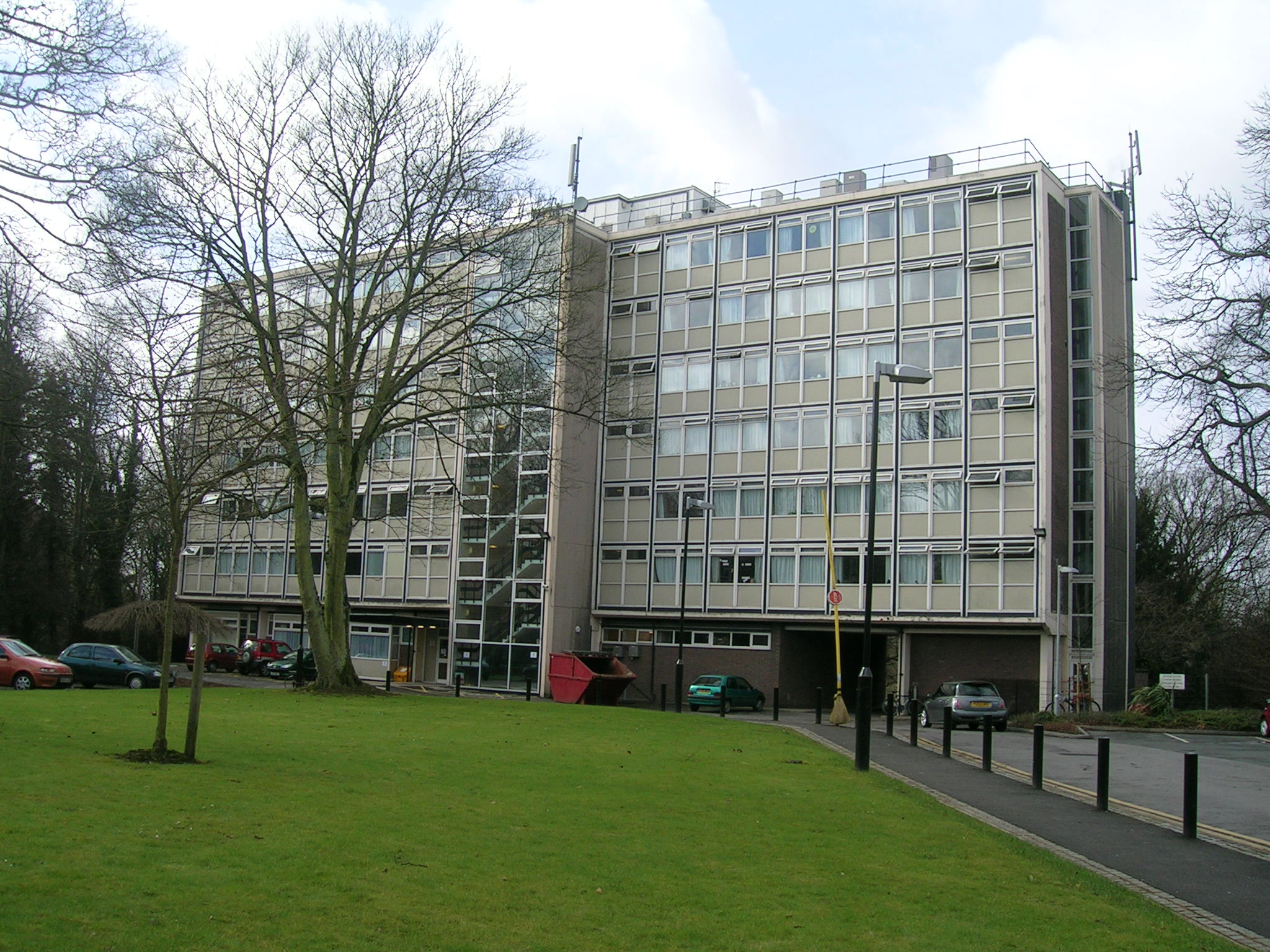
Broomhurst Halls of Residence

Over the next two decades, numerous buildings were constructed on the site; Behrens, Birley and Simon were all named after prominent local families with ties to the college. The date the building was opened is given in parentheses where known:

- Simon Building (1963; construction started in 1957). Included lecture rooms, a gymnasium, assembly hall, refectory and kitchen.
- Behrens Building
- Broomhurst Hall (1963). A mixed halls of residence on the site of the playing field.
- Royal Ford Hall of Residence (November 1965); off-site.
- Birley Building (1968). Included a refectory, kitchen and teaching rooms.
- Assembly hall and drama studio (1968; constructed between 1963 and 1964).
- Sports centre and swimming pool (1973).
- Purpose-built library (1975).

Park End House, originally a home for the principal, was converted into residential accommodation in 1946, and houses on Didsbury Park were purchased by the college in the 1960s as student hostels. In 1968 the bedrooms of the college were converted into tutorial offices, and the Old Social Room, which had been built during the Second World War, was converted into a college club, complete with a bar, which eventually moved into the Old Chapel.

Didsbury Teacher Training College was renamed Didsbury College of Education in 1963, following the Robbins Report on Higher Education. By 1966 student numbers had risen to 1,100, with 107 staff. In the late 1960s, under the second principal Ronald Goldman, plans were made to change the college into the University of South Manchester, though these never came to fruition. By 1970 student numbers had increased significantly, to 1,550.

=== Polytechnic and university: 1977–2014 ===
Didsbury became part of Manchester Polytechnic in 1977, renamed Didsbury School of Education. The merger was met with some opposition by students, who considered the polytechnic to be "quite different" from the college. The City of Manchester College of Higher Education merged with the polytechnic in 1983, and in 1992 it gained university status, becoming Manchester Metropolitan University. In the same year it merged with Crewe and Alsager College, which became the university's Cheshire campus. As part of a university, Didsbury was granted an annual research fund of £375,000, and by 1995 the first doctorates in education were being planned, with PhDs introduced later. There were 1,867 students by 1986, and throughout the 1980s and 1990s there were ongoing improvements to technology. Computers became commonplace, and interactive whiteboards were introduced across all classrooms by 2009. In 1999 the School of Education became known as the Institute of Education, and student numbers reached a peak of 3,207 in 2004. In 2005 the library was significantly renovated and updated, with mezzanine floors, a lift, and group study rooms being constructed. Didsbury became the base of the Science Learning Centre North West (later known as STEM) in 2005, following the building of new science laboratories costing £2 million. In 2008 the institute was renamed the Faculty of Education. It was placed 8th on the national league tables in the same year, and was the highest rated new university with a large education faculty.

In 2006 the university made proposals to significantly develop Didsbury, bringing the School of Health, Psychology and Social Care and the Institute of Education onto the Didsbury site, after the closure of the Elizabeth Gaskell campus. Plans involved the creation of £19 million multi-storey teaching blocks and upgraded buildings, and improved access to facilities such as the library and sports centre. The plans were criticised by local residents, whose main concern was parking, since the plans could lead to 1,900 new students on site and 240 new staff. By 2008, plans had changed and it was decided to close the Didsbury campus and move the 2,740 students to a new facility in Hulme, later named Birley Fields. This new campus, close to the All Saints campus in the city centre, was designed to replace all of the university's other Manchester campuses, with funds arising from the land that was sold off. Reactions to the announced closure were mixed; local traders and businesses were worried about the impact of the loss of students, but many residents supported the move, especially those who had opposed expansion. The Didsbury campus was finally closed in August 2014, and the new £140 million Birley Fields campus opened on 2 October 2014, after two years of construction. In total, the university spent £350 million on new facilities at Birley Fields, as well as the All Saints and Cheshire campuses.

=== St James Park: 2014–present ===
As of 2018 the site is being redeveloped by local architects PJ Livesey, as a residential area of 93 homes, with the listed buildings being retained. The former administration building will contain 19 apartments, within the original part of the building, and 12 houses in the wings as mews homes; the Old Chapel will contain 10 apartments; the lodge will become a house; and 801 and 803 Wilmslow Road will become houses. A further 42 three, four, and five-bedroomed houses will be built, along with garages and gardens. There will be seven new apartments, with an underground car park. The area will be known as St James Park, and a new 420-place primary school, operated by Beaver Road Primary School, will be constructed on the land previously occupied by Broomhurst Hall.

== Academics ==
When the college was opened in 1946, teacher training followed the standard route of two years, albeit initially taking a shorter time during the first few years as an emergency college. Courses available included rural studies, nature studies, handicraft, metalwork, physical education, mathematics, science, chemistry, music, geography, English, history, drama, art, religious studies, and infant education. As a result of the Robbins Report, the certificate was extended to three years, and in 1966 the first students of the Bachelor of Education (BEd) degree – awarded by the University of Manchester – enrolled, graduating three years later in 1969. One of the most important subjects introduced was education studies, and a graduate course was introduced in the 1960s that would eventually become the PGCE, introduced in the 1970s. Further courses, including sociology, and European and American Studies were also introduced at this time. By the 1970s courses in compensatory education and special needs had been added to the curriculum, in addition to in-service courses for qualified teachers. It was around this time that Didsbury students began to be taught by subject specialists, and the PGCE was organised by subject. In 1973 BEd students were offered a fourth year of studies to gain an honours degree, and in 1980 this became standard for all students. Teaching and learning through ICT became embedded in the 2000s. There was also a degree in early childhood studies available. The latest courses introduced were youth work and social work.

Teaching students spent time away from the campus in a school to develop their skills. The amount of time in schools varied across the years and across courses, with the PGCE students spending 24 weeks in schools. Students were supervised on placement by visiting university tutors. Until 1990 each student had two tutors, to ensure consistency and to moderate, but this was changed to one owing to costs. The BEd began to be phased out from 2005, replaced with a BA degree in primary education.

From the beginning, Didsbury encouraged connections to educational institutions in other countries, with at least 1000 people reported to have visited during the first nine months, from Greece, Norway, Denmark, the Netherlands and America. Staff and students made visits to foreign countries, including Germany and Russia, with students from these countries visiting Didsbury. In the 1970s visits to Germany, France, the Netherlands and the United States became a major part of Didsbury's courses, and these relationships were strengthened when the UK joined the European Economic Community. The Erasmus Programme, a European Union initiative set up in 1987, established partner institutions across Europe, allowing staff and students to spend significant amounts of time abroad, most while studying the BEd degree from 1991 onwards. The purpose of Erasmus was to allow students to gain experience in a foreign setting, and return to the UK with knowledge and skills that would impact the children they would teach. As a result of a policy change for accommodation, visits to Finland by students with their children were made possible in 2000. In 2008, it was extended to include Bridgewater State College in the United States, and Hong Kong Institute of Education, despite not being in Europe.

== Buildings ==
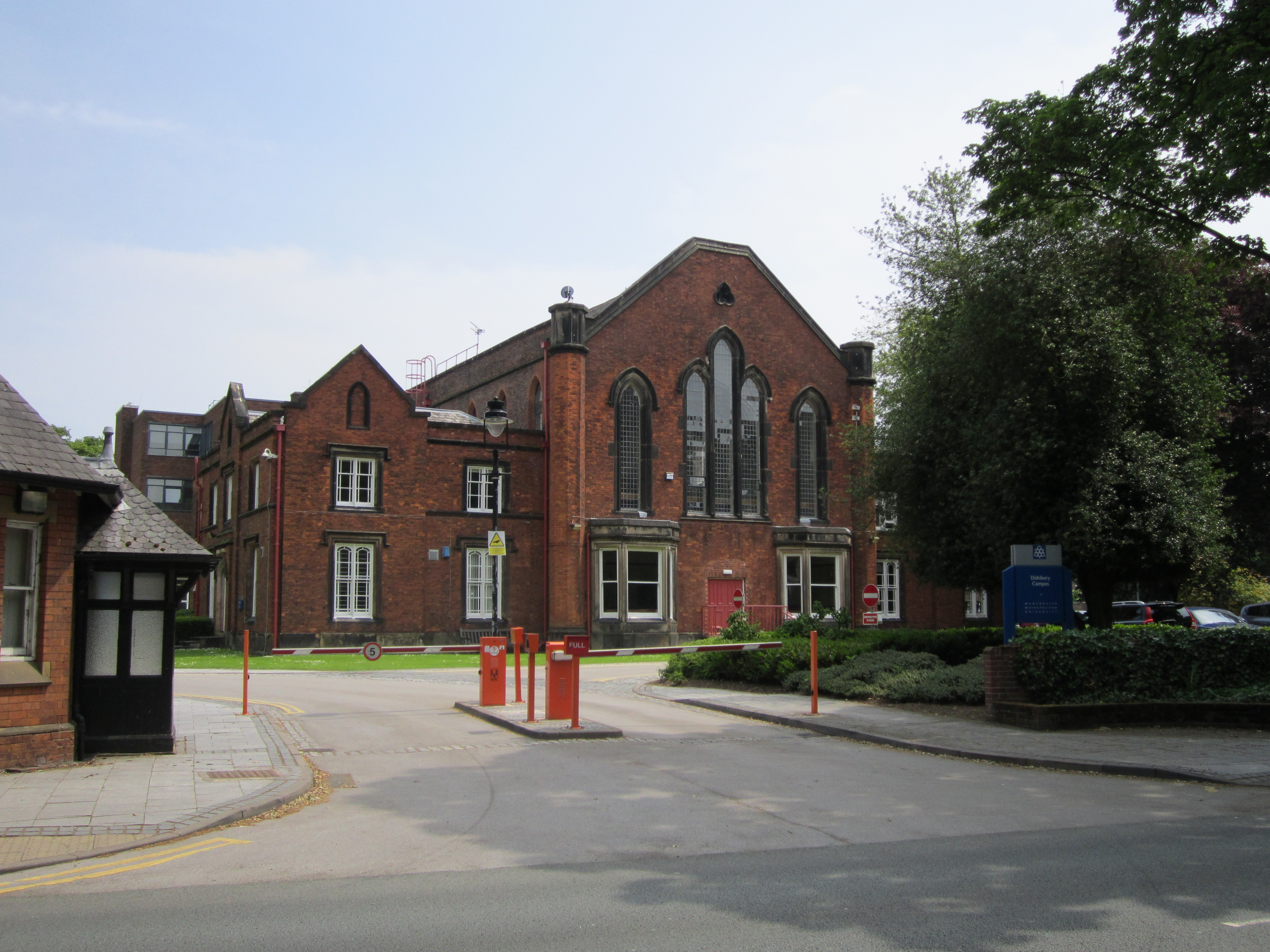
The main entrance to the campus from Wilmslow Road. The Lodge is on the left, and the Old Chapel is on the right.

The campus was situated south of Didsbury village on Wilmslow Road, approximately 5.5 miles (8.9 km) from Manchester City Centre, as the road turns east towards Parrs Wood. It contained the following buildings as of the final academic year it was occupied by Manchester Metropolitan University:

=== Listed buildings ===
==== Administration building ====
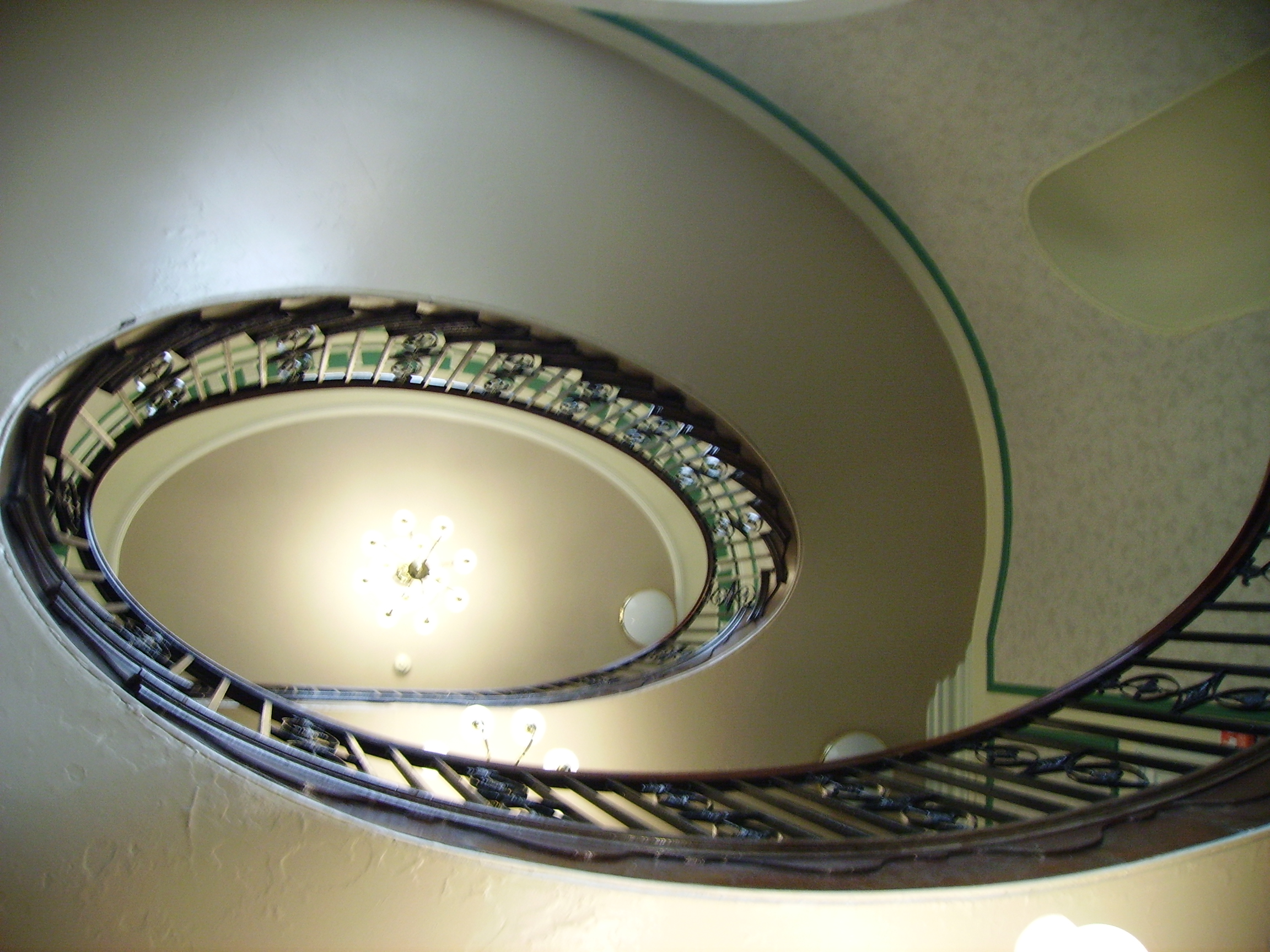
The elliptical spiral staircase in the entrance hall of the administration building

The administration building (now known as Sandhurst House) is the oldest building on the site, dating back to around 1785. After the Wesleyans purchased it in 1842, they extended it by adding two Neo-Grecian style wings and a back to form a central courtyard. The architect was probably Richard Lane. The front of the original house was reclad in a sandstone ashlar facade, with the original rear and courtyard walls of Flemish bond red brick remaining. In 1930 glazed skylights were added to the slate roofs, and the Old Social Room, later the student resource centre, was built in the courtyard during the Second World War.

The west side of the original three-storey building consists of five bays, with the two-storey 1842 additions making a total of 11 bays. There are four pilasters decorated with carved lotus leaf capitals and acanthus bases. Pevsner suggests that these architectural details were taken from illustrations by James Stuart and Nicholas Revett of the Ancient Greek Tower of the Winds in Athens, and notes that identical decorations can be seen on another house by Lane at 84 Plymouth Grove in Manchester, later occupied by Elizabeth Gaskell. The east range consists of 16 bays, with a passageway in the centre. The main entrance hall contains an elliptical spiral staircase with an iron balustrade, which leads up to the former reception rooms and bedrooms. This building was designated a Grade II* listed building on 25 February 1952.

During the time the university occupied the site, the building contained bedrooms for students, and later, most of the offices of lecturers and administration staff.

==== Old Chapel ====
The Old Chapel building, originally the college chapel, is one of the campus's listed buildings, gaining Grade II listed status on 6 June 1994. It is a two-storey building constructed in gothic style, with Flemish bond brickwork, built on a sandstone plinth in 1842. It is also likely to be the work of Richard Lane. The structure consists of three wings, containing a central hall range, with two domestic wings on each side, initially used as tutor accommodation, forming a symmetrical appearance with the gable end of the upper hall. For many years it was used as a library and lecture theatre. The ground floor eventually became the student union, and contained a bar and café. The first floor was used as the base of ESRI (Education and Social Research Institute) and lecture space.

==== The Lodge ====
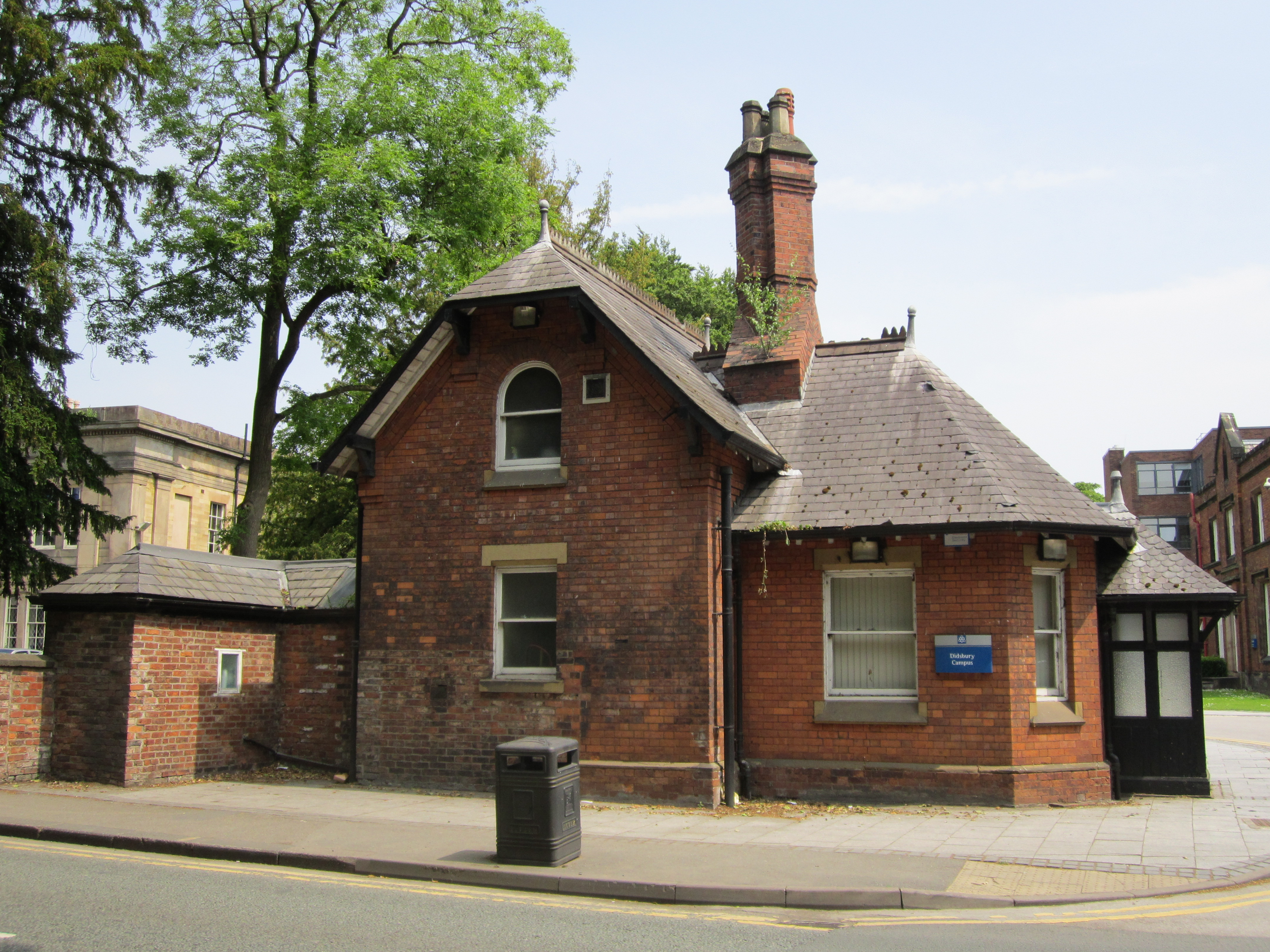
The Lodge

This building is situated near to the Old Chapel on the edge of the campus, and was constructed in the 1870s as a gatehouse. As an associated building to the grander college building, it is considered to be curtilage listed. In modern times it housed security and is due to be developed as a private property.

=== Other buildings ===
The Birley Building was a four-storey building which contained the refectory and kitchen, a conference centre, and numerous classrooms, including art and ceramic studios and computer suites. It was attached directly to the library, which was spread over three floors and modernised in 2005. It contained group work rooms and study areas. Academic books and journals were available for research, as well as children's books and other resources for students to use during school-based placements.

The Behrens Building was three floors high and mainly consisted of classrooms, although it originally contained a student common room and study area. During the library's redesign, the ground floor of Behrens was used as a temporary library.

Attached to Behrens was the Simon Building, which contained a variety of rooms including classrooms, lecture theatres, science laboratories, offices, music rooms, technology rooms, and the assembly hall and foyer. At basement level there was a drama studio. The Simon Building originally contained a gymnasium and refectory with an associated kitchen, and in 2006 there were proposals to demolish part of the building to make space for new teaching facilities.

The sports centre, which was open to the public, contained a dance studio, a gym, and a sports hall, as well as changing rooms. Until 2000 it also housed a swimming pool, but this was closed as a result of the opening of Manchester Aquatics Centre, despite protests by local residents. Externally there were tennis courts. Other buildings on the campus included temporary classrooms, some dating from the 1940s.
