= Woodstock Arms =

Listed pub in Manchester, England

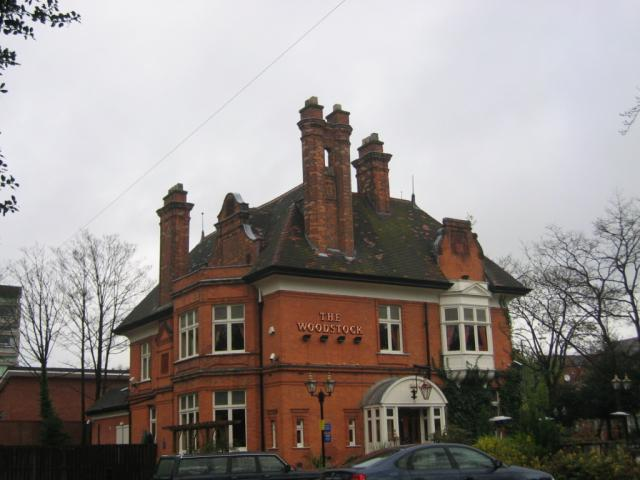
- The pub in 2005

- Location within Greater Manchester
- Alternative names: The Woodstock

General information
- Type: House then office (late 19th century–1992); Public house (1992–present)
- Architectural style: Queen Anne
- Location: 139 Barlow Moor Road, West Didsbury, Manchester, England
- Coordinates: 53.4217°N 2.2456°W
- Year built: Late 19th century
- Client: Edward Rogerson
- Owner: Mitchells & Butlers

Design and construction
- Architects: Bell and Roper
- Designations

Listed Building – Grade II
- Official name: No. 139, Barlow Moor Road
- Designated: 27 April 1992
- Reference no.: 1197801

Website
- thewoodstockarmsdidsbury.co.uk

The Woodstock Arms (also known as The Woodstock and officially listed as 139 Barlow Moor Road) is a Grade II listed public house in West Didsbury, a suburb of Manchester, England. Built in the late 19th century as a large detached house designed by Bell and Roper for Edward Rogerson, it was later occupied by a succession of tenants and is shown as "Woodstock" on Ordnance Survey maps of 1894 and 1936. The building was listed in 1992 while in use as an office of the British Council, and was converted into a pub later that year.

== History ==
The building was constructed in the late 19th century and was originally a large detached house, according to its official listing. (Note: Another source gives a construction date of 1877.) It was designed by the architects Bell and Roper for Edward Rogerson.

Tax records from the 1880s show that Rogerson owned two substantial houses on neighbouring plots: Woodstock on Barlow Moor Road and Oakdene on Mersey Road. He was recorded as living at Woodstock in 1878. From 1883 the house was let to William Ford Smith, an engineer and tool maker, who remained there until his death in 1904. Later residents included James Edward Marsland, a cotton merchant, as listed in directories for 1909–11.

The 1894 and 1936 Ordnance Survey maps show the house with the name Woodstock.

On 27 April 1992, the building, then used as an office of the British Council, was designated a Grade II listed building. The British Council vacated the premises at some point thereafter, and in December 1992 Manchester City Council validated a planning application for alterations and an extension to form a public house. As of July 2023, the pub's freehold is owned by Mitchells & Butlers.

== Architecture ==
The building is constructed of red brick with a red‑tiled roof and is arranged around a square plan with a large porch and stair block on the north side. It is designed in a Queen Anne revival style and has two storeys above cellars, with a horizontal band between the floors, deep plastered eaves and steep roofs.

The main entrance front is centred on a prominent stair tower. This has a wide balcony supported on substantial stone brackets with iron railings, a doorway beneath it, and a very large canted window rising from the balcony to the eaves. The window has timber framing with a semi-circular pane in the middle and is topped by a parapet with a small pediment. Above is a hipped roof with a shaped brick feature containing a terracotta panel. The flanking sections have only one narrow ground‑floor window each.

The east side includes a round‑arched opening in the centre and a small first‑floor oriel to the right, echoing the design of the front with a similar shaped upstand above. The south side has a two‑storey canted bay on the right with cross‑framed windows, a parapet and a large shaped gable behind. The chimneys are notably tall.

== See also ==
- Listed buildings in Manchester-M20
- Listed pubs in Greater Manchester
