= Church of St James, Didsbury =

Church in Greater Manchester, England

St James, Didsbury, Manchester
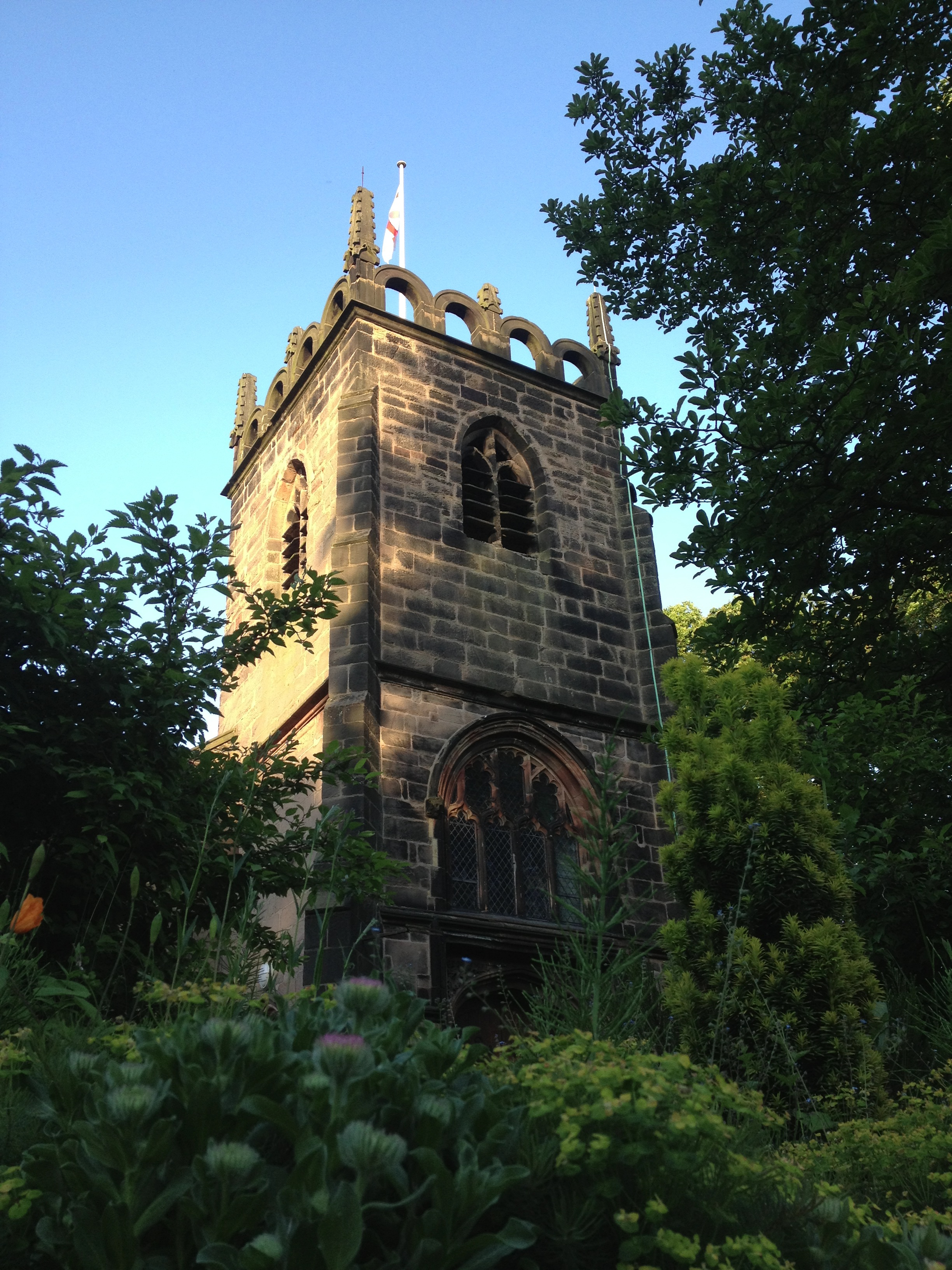
- St James, Didsbury

- Location in Greater Manchester
- 53.4100°N 2.2318°W
- Location: Stenner Lane, Didsbury; Manchester, England
- Denomination: Church of England
- Churchmanship: Open Evangelical
- Website: stjamesandemmanuel.org

History
- Dedication: St James

Architecture
- Heritage designation: Grade II*
- Designated: 25 February 1952

Administration
- Diocese: Diocese of Manchester
- Archdeaconry: Manchester archdeaconry
- Deanery: Withington deanery
- Parish: St James & Emmanuel, Didsbury

Clergy
- Priest(s): Revd Canon Lisa Battye, Revd Christine Sandiford, Revd Cate Allison, Revd Augustine Ihm

The Church of St James is a Church of England church on Stenner Lane in Didsbury, a suburb of Manchester, England. Together with Emmanuel Church on Barlow Moor Road, it forms the parish of St James and Emmanuel, Didsbury. The church is a Grade II* listed building.

== History ==
In 1235 Albertus de Gresley granted land to Nicholas de Longford, Lord of the Manor of Withington, for the foundation of his own chapel in Didsbury. The first mention of the chapel appears in the records of the Lancashire Assizes when "William, Chaplain of Didsbury, came not on the first day and was fined."

In 1352 the Bishop of Lichfield gave permission for the consecration of a churchyard for the burial of the victims of the Black Death.

In 1541 the Diocese of Chester was formed, and the church was transferred from the Diocese of Lichfield. The parish covered an area from the River Mersey to Moss Side, and from Chorlton-cum-Hardy to Heaton Norris and Reddish.

In accordance with the orders of Elizabeth I, all records of births, deaths, and marriages began to be kept in 1561. The original register is in the City of Manchester Archives and includes the record of the baptism of Saint Ambrose Barlow on 30 November 1585.

On 25 February 1952, the Church of St James was designated a Grade II* listed building.

In 2025 the parish's team rector, Nicholas Bundock, was elected and installed as Bishop of Glasgow and Galloway.

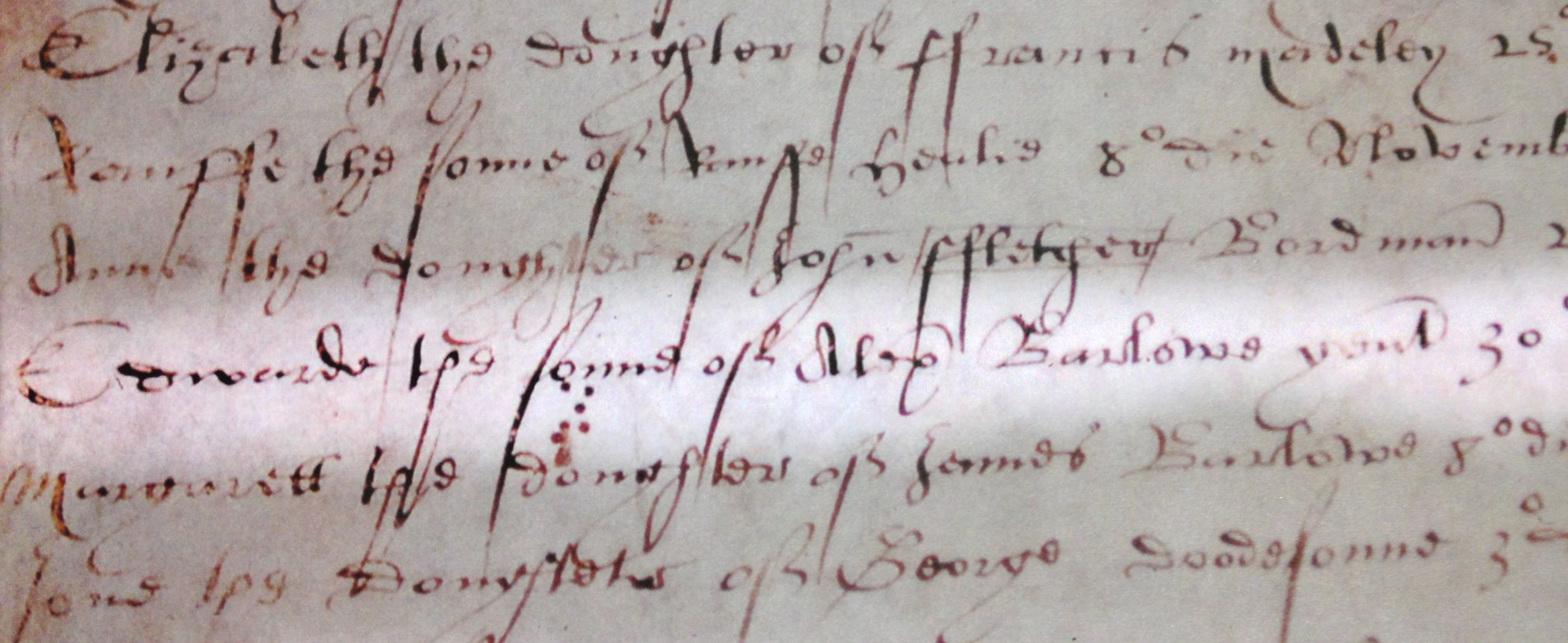
Baptism Record of Ambrose Barlow

== Architecture and setting ==
St James is an ancient Anglican church of medieval origin with significant subsequent 17th and mid-19th-century modifications.

The original chapel is believed to have been a 13th-century oratory. Rebuilding, including the "dumpy" tower, took place in the early 17th century. A memorial stone over the tower's north door commemorates its benefactors, Sir Edward Mosley and Anne Mosley, and bears the date "1620". The pinnacles and loops surmounting the tower date from 1801. The Mosley family, local magnates, were the benefactors. The chapel became the parish church of Didsbury in 1850. The nave was constructed in 1855, the chancel in 1871, and the east part of the south aisle in 1895. The church is built of red sandstone with slate roofs.

The architectural historian Pevsner found the interior "odd, [with] early seventeenth century fabric, but later additions and alterations [have] changed its character". The 18th-century galleries have been removed, and substantial reconstruction took place in the 1850s and 1890s. The stained glass is entirely 19th-century. The church contains impressive funerary monuments, particularly those of the Mosley family. A "good early C17 wall monument in Renaissance style ... a 3-bay Ionic colonnade surmounted by a central Corinthian architrave with cresting, with kneeling figures in each part" commemorates Ralph Mosley, who died in 1616. Sir Nicholas Mosley, the builder of Hough End Hall, is shown kneeling, "dressed in the robes of the Lord Mayor of London (1599)". The Mosley heiress Ann, Lady Bland, founder of St Ann's Church, Manchester, who is buried here, is also represented.

The interior of the church underwent significant repair and renovation in 2012 as part of the 775th-anniversary celebrations.

== Bell tower ==
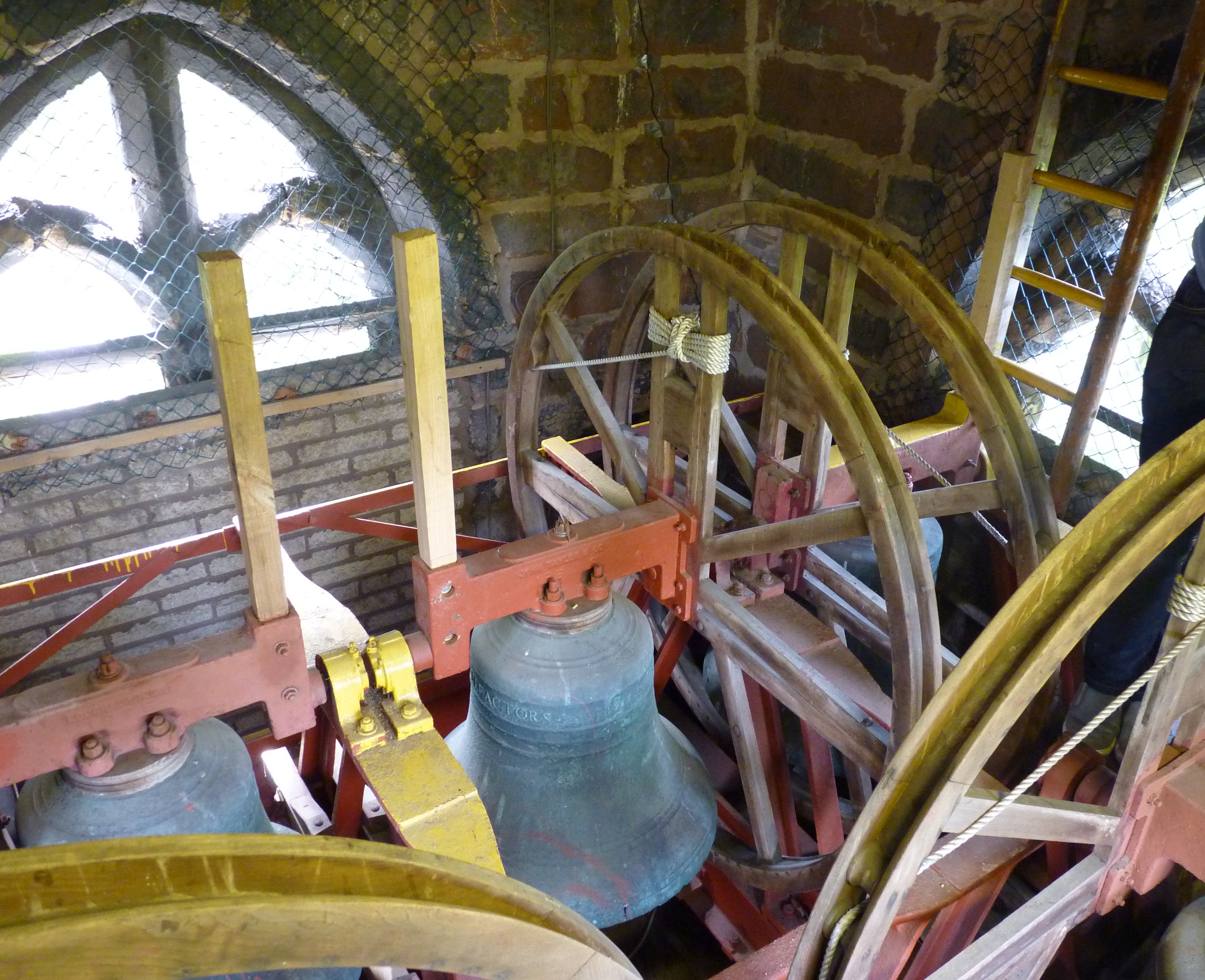
St James Bell Chamber

The six St James' bells date from 1727 and were cast in Gloucester. They are rung before worship on Sundays and for weddings and other special occasions.

== See also ==
- Grade II* listed buildings in Greater Manchester
- Listed buildings in Manchester-M20
