= Parrs Wood High School =

Coordinates: 53°24′30″N 2°13′01″W

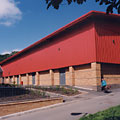
- East Didsbury, Greater Manchester; England

Information
- Type: Academy
- Motto: ‘’Community Creativity Achievement‘’ and ‘’Believe. Achieve. Succeed.‘’
- Established: 1967
- Local authority: Manchester
- Trust: Greater Manchester Education Trust
- Department for Education URN: 143260 Tables
- Ofsted: Reports
- Headteacher: Mark McElwee
- Staff: 250
- Gender: Coeducational
- Age: 11 to 18
- Enrolment: 1,969
- Capacity: 1838
- Colours: Navy blue and silver
- Trust CEO: D. Owen
- Website: www.pwhs.co.uk

Parrs Wood High School is a coeducational secondary school in East Didsbury, Manchester, England, located off Wilmslow Road behind Parrs Wood Entertainment Complex. It educates pupils from the age of 11 to 18 years. A-Levels are taught at the Parrs Wood Sixth Form Centre, which is integrated with the main school.

== History ==
Parrs Wood was the 4th largest school in the UK in 2008, with 2,030 students and 450 in the sixth form centre.

In 2015, the governors of Parrs Wood decided to embark on the process of turning the school into an academy, despite opposition from staff and local politicians.

It converted in 2016, the former school had community school status; its URN was 105556.

After the Manchester Arena bombing, the school's choir recorded the title track from Ariana Grande's My Everything to benefit the victims. The choir then performed the song at the One Love Manchester concert with Ariana Grande herself to further honour and aid the victims.

== The building ==
The original school building, built in 1967, was demolished in 2000 and was rebuilt from scratch on a site behind the original school; the contractors built the school building in exchange for a portion of the school grounds on which to build an entertainment complex.

== Sixth form ==
Parrs Wood Sixth Form Centre is part of the school campus. It opened in 2000 after the rebuilding of the main school. The centre is located in a Grade II listed building independent from the main school.

== Ofsted ==
In 2007, an Ofsted inspection showed the school to be lacking in several areas, particularly in KS3 SAT results, and criticised the school management for failure to act to remedy the situation. The report reflected that this situation was unacceptable and the school was placed in special measures. In February 2010, OFSTED judged the school to be satisfactory and as such no longer required special measures.

In its most recent inspection, the school was graded as Grade 2 - Good.

== Controversy ==
=== CS Gas Discharge (2007) ===
In May 2007, a canister of CS gas was discharged in the science area of Parrs Wood, which resulted in 58 students and staff being taken to hospital. The incident was described by Greater Manchester Police as an "idiotic prank".

=== Casino (2011) ===
The school is directly opposite a branch of Grosvenor G Casinos in the Parrs Wood entertainment centre complex. Members of Manchester City Council's planning committee originally rejected the plans to build the casino after Didsbury residents objected due to a possible negative effect on the livelihood of pupils at the school, as students would have to walk past the casino on a daily basis in order to attend. Despite the original rejection, Grosvenor G Casinos were granted planning permission in March 2011. The Parrs Wood branch has been open as of June 2012.

=== Governor suspension (2012) ===
In 2012, Judge Peeling QC found against the governing body of the school in a Judicial Review of a decision to suspend one of the governors.

=== Free Palestine Antisemitism (2021) ===
In May 2021, a Year 8 student at Parrs Wood High School got excluded for half a day after yelling "Free Palestine" in a tech class. The school’s letter called it "racist abuse" and warned the parents to stop it happening again. They later explained the shout was aimed at a Jewish student who had already been previously harassed by this peer. The school saw it as targeted bullying based on religion/race, not punishing political speech, and handled it under UK anti-discrimination rules. The incident received a lot of backlash online. Some Muslim advocacy groups said the school overreacted and were censoring pro-Palestine views, which might scare students away from supporting Palestine amid the conflict in Gaza. These groups often ignored the school’s claim that the incident was personal and targeted. Mainstream reports supported the school, saying the punishment was given due to the aggression toward one person, and was to enforce anti-bullying rules rather than punishing political views. No further action or changes happened after this incident.

=== Stabbing Incident (2023) ===
In January 2023, a 14-year-old girl suffered serious, though not life-threatening, injuries after being stabbed by a fellow student using a 'sharp instrument'. The perpetrator was arrested by police. The boy was first let out on bail in February 2023 while police continued looking into the attack. On January 25, 2024, Greater Manchester Police said he’d been released with no charges after a full investigation showed no further action was needed. Police didn’t share any extra info about motives or if the students involved knew each other beforehand.

== Notable former pupils ==
- Qasim Akhtar, actor
- Johnny Bennett, actor
- Matt Crampton, cyclist
- Martin Galway, video game music composer
- Holliday Grainger, English screen and stage actress
- Lisa Nandy, Labour MP and Secretary of State for Culture, Media and Sport
- Adam O'Riordan, writer
- Hannah Pool, fashion writer
- Lucy Powell, Labour MP and Deputy Leader of the Labour Party
- Chris Roberts, game designer
- Nick Speak, cricketer

== Pictures ==
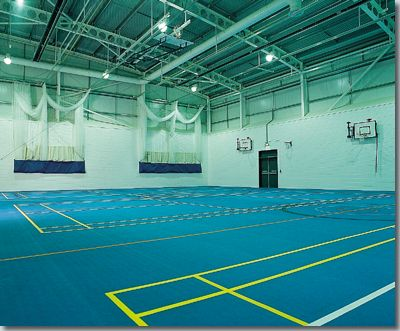
School's main sports hall

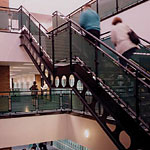
Part of the open-plan school

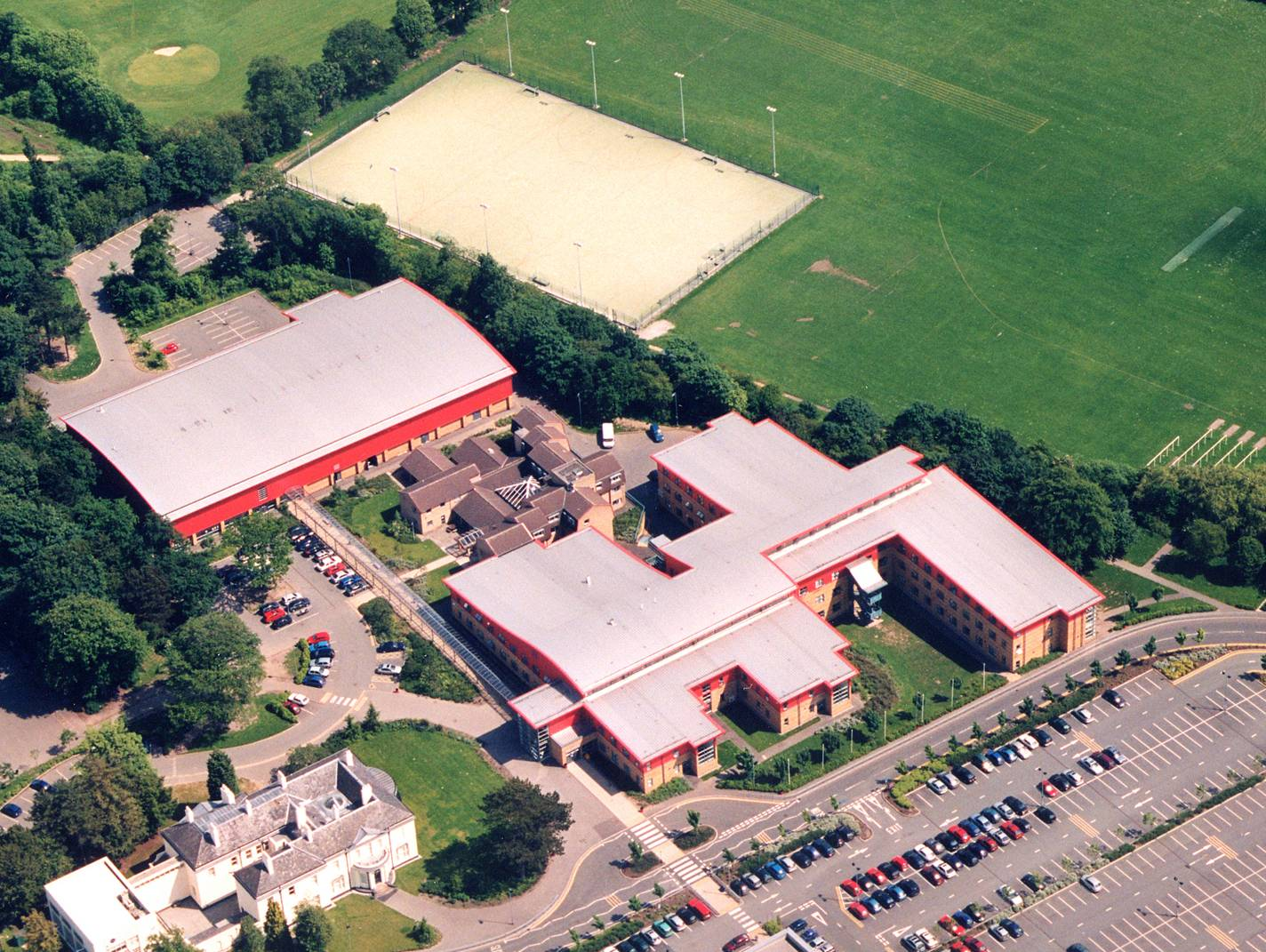
A bird's-eye view of the Parrs Wood School campus

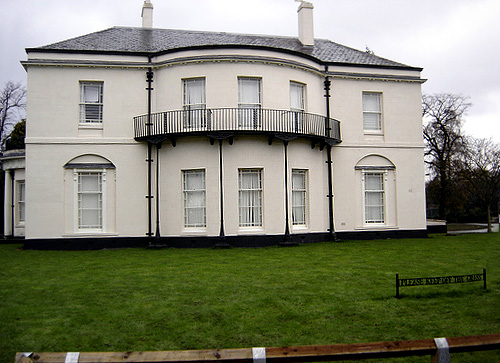
Parrs Wood House, a Grade II* listed Victorian building once belonging to the Parrs family, which houses the Sixth Form Centre
