= Manchester Corinthians L.F.C. =

Manchester Corinthians
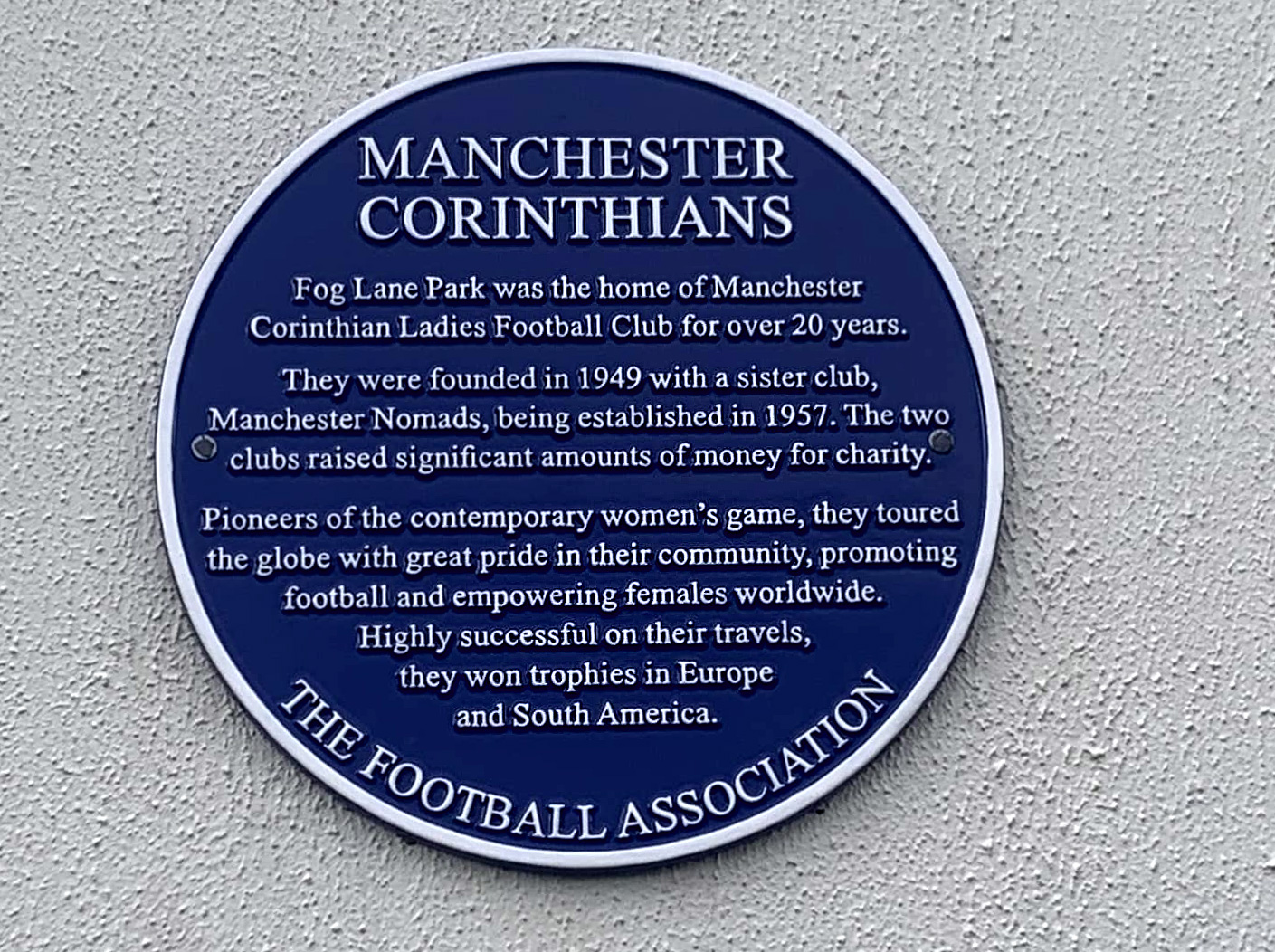
- Manchester Corinthians LFC blue plaque in Fog Lane Park
- Full name: Manchester Corinthians Ladies Football Club
- Founded: 5 January 1949; 77 years ago
- Dissolved: 1982; 44 years ago (name changed to Woodley Ladies)
- Ground: Fog Lane Park; Didsbury, Manchester
Home colours

Manchester Corinthians L.F.C. was a leading English women's football club of the 1950s and 1960s.

The team was founded in 1949 by Percy Ashley, principally so that his daughter, Doris, could play. Their home ground was Fog Lane Park in Didsbury, although it had such basic facilities that players had to take post-match baths in a nearby duck pond. Ashley chose the team name as a homage to Corinthian FC, the men's amateur football team from London, famous for their sporting ideals.

The team proved immediately successful, and by 1951 had won the Southern Cup, Manchester Area Cup, Sports Magazine Cup, Roses Trophy, Midland Trophy, Cresswell Trophy, Odeon Championship Trophy, Belle Vue Trophy, and Festival of Britain Championship Trophy. The team won the large majority of its matches, and often racked up large margins of victory. In 1957, in order to have more local opposition to play, Ashley set up a second, linked, team, The Nomads, which was effectively the club's second eleven.

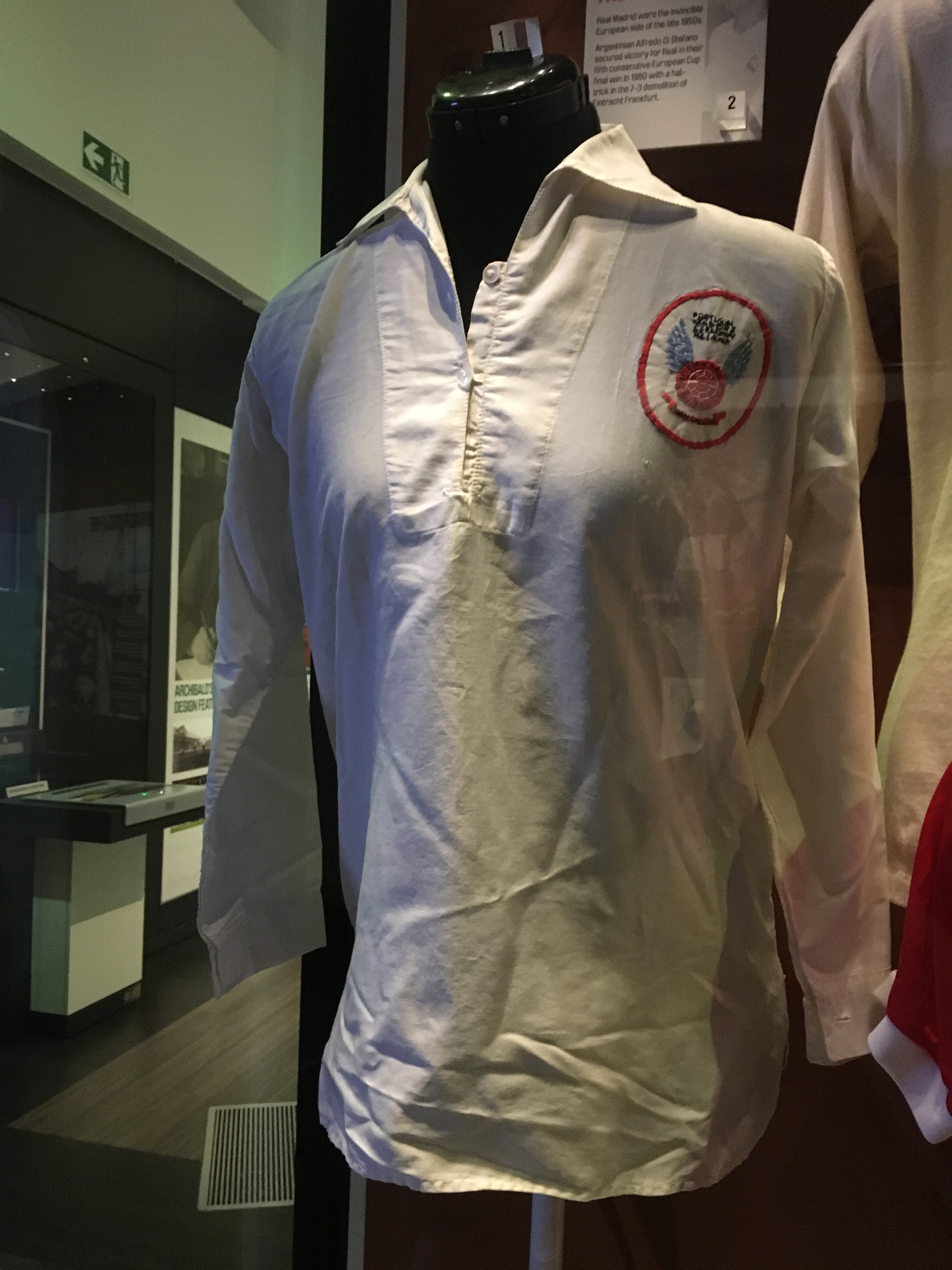
1958 Manchester Corinthians shirt belonging to Margaret Shepherd

In 1957, the team toured Portugal, then completed in the International Ladies Football Association-organised European Cup, where it beat a team representing Germany. During the tournament, Bert Trautmann acted as the team's interpreter. This proved the first of many annual tours, the longest being a 12-week tour of South American and the Caribbean in 1960. Some matches attracted crowds of tens of thousands, and large amounts were raised for charity.

Percy Ashley died in 1967, and the team was gradually eclipsed by newer clubs. It won the first Deal International Tournament, in 1968, and took part in an international tournament in Reims in 1970, beating ACF Juventus 1–0 in the final. It also won the Women's Football Association's (WFA) Teddy Gray Memorial Challenge Trophy in 1968 and 1969, losing in the final in 1970. In June 1970 Corinthians were one of the 44 clubs to be represented at the WFA's inaugural annual general meeting at Caxton Hall. It then joined the Three Counties League. However, by the end of the decade, it had declined.

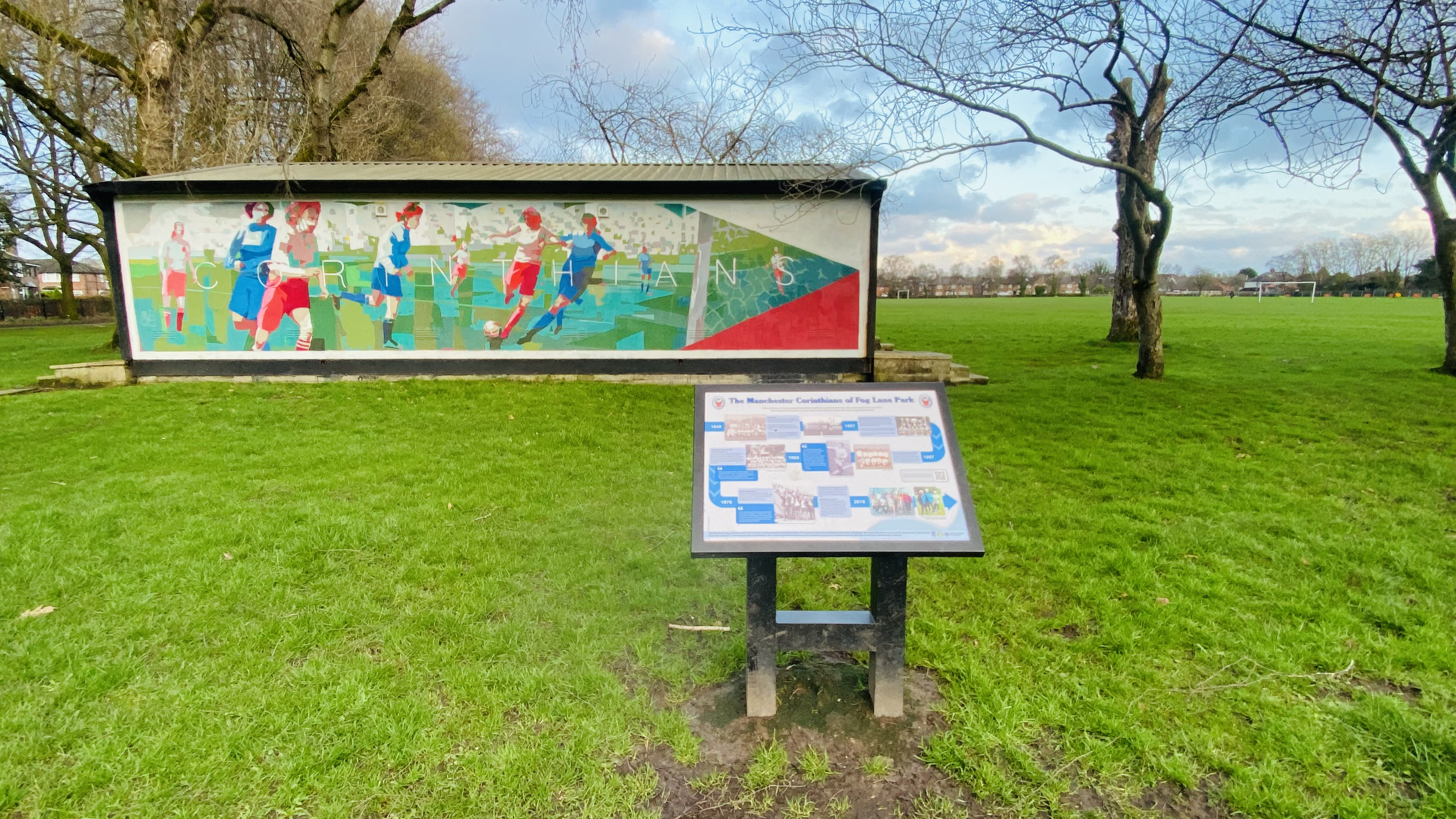
Corinthians commemorative mural, Fog Lane Park 02

In 2023, the club house in Fog Lane Park was adorned with a mural commemorating the history of Manchester Corinthians, and a blue plaque was mounted.
