= Verona Conway =

British ecologist (1910-1986)

Verona Margaret Conway
- Born: January 13, 1910; Didsbury, Manchester, England
- Died: December 19, 1986 (aged 76)
- Education: Newnham College, Girton College
- Scientific career
- Fields: Plant ecology
- Workplaces: Westfield College, University of Sheffield, Nature Conservancy
- Doctoral advisor: Harry Godwin

Verona Margaret Conway (13 January 1910 – 19 December 1986) was a British plant ecologist and Unitarian minister. She undertook international recognised research on the palaeoecology of the Pennines and the ecology of Cladium mariscus.

== Early life and education ==
Conway was born on 13 January 1910 in Didsbury, Manchester. Her father held the chair of Latin at the University of Manchester. Margaret Mary Hall, her mother, studied Classics at Newnham College. Conway went to school in Manchester, before studying Natural Sciences at the University of Cambridge, with a Part II in botany. After completing her undergraduate degree, she was awarded the Yarrow Research Scholarship at Girton College from 1933 to 1936. Her doctoral supervisor was Harry Godwin. She was awarded her PhD in 1937, with a dissertation entitled Studies in the autecology of Cladium mariscus R.Br. Her work was published in New Phytologist.

== Scientific career ==
From 1936 to 1939, Conway was a demonstrator and assistant lecturer in botany at Westfield College. From 1939 to 1941, during the Blitz, she was a volunteer ambulance driver in London.

She then obtained a position in the Botany Department at the University of Sheffield, where she investigated the bogs on the nearby Hallam Moors. She spent a year abroad studying the bogs of central Minnesota with funding from the American Association of University Women. After two more years at Sheffield University, she obtained a position at the Nature Conservancy. In 1955, she was appointed director of Merlewood Research Station.

Conway was described as one of plant ecology's "ablest and most clear-thinking workers." She was noted as a teacher, and taught the leading ecologist Derek Ratcliffe.

In 1982 she was elected as an Honorary Member of the British Ecological Society.

== Later career ==
Conway left science in 1961, and became a Unitarian Church minister in Lancaster. She retired in 1973. Conway died on 19 December 1986.

== Selected publications ==
- Conway, Verona M. 1936. Studies in the autecology of Cladium mariscus R. Br. I. Structure and development. The New Phytologist 35(3): 177–204.
- Godwin, H. C. V. M., and Verona M. Conway. 1939. The ecology of a raised bog near Tregaron, Cardiganshire. The Journal of Ecology: 313–359.
- Conway, Verona M. 1948. Von Post's work on climatic rhythms. The New Phytologist 47(2): 220–237.
- Conway, Verona M. 1949. The bogs of central Minnesota. Ecological Monographs 19(2): 173-206.
