= Fog Lane Park =

Urban park in Withington and Didsbury, Manchester

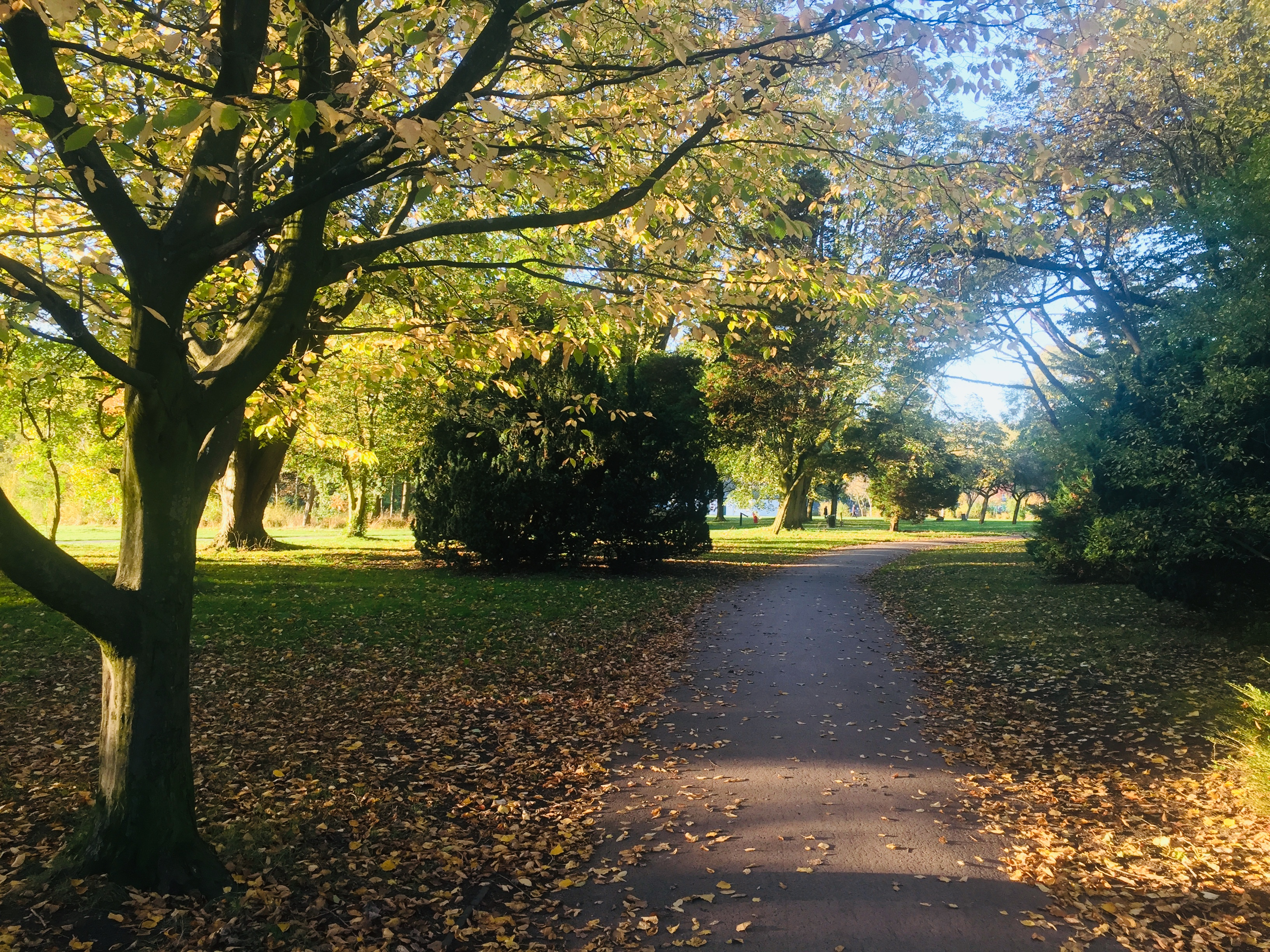
- A scenic view of Fog Lane Park
- Interactive map of Fog Lane Park
- Type: Urban park, recreational area
- Location: Withington, Didsbury, Manchester, UK
- Coordinates: 53°25′27.9″N 2°13′24.6″W
- Area: 10 acres (4.0 ha)
- Created: 1926
- Operator: Manchester City Council
- Status: Open year-round
- Public transit: Burnage railway station
- Website: Fog Lane Park information at Manchester City Council

Fog Lane Park is a public urban park located in the Withington and Didsbury areas of Manchester, England. The park offers a variety of recreational facilities.

== History ==
Until the early 20th century, the area now occupied by Fog Lane Park was farmland. To the east of the park were fields belonging to Pytha Fold Farm, where the first ever powered flight from London to Manchester, piloted by French pilot Louis Paulhan, landed on 28 April 1910. Today, a blue plaque commemorating the landing spot is affixed to a house in Paulhan Road, a few metres from the park boundary.

Fog Lane Park was established in 1926 by the Manchester City Council. Fog Lane Park earned its name from a grass commonly known as "Yorkshire Fog", a grass species which grows within the park. Fog Lane Park was one of the first public parks in all of Manchester.

=== Women's football ===
Fog Lane Park became part of the history of women's football in England when the Manchester Corinthians L.F.C. team was founded in 1949 and adopted Fog Lane Park as their home ground. At the time, The Football Association banned women from competing in association football, and the team was formed on an amateur basis to offer local female players an opportunity to play. The changing rooms at the park had no running water, and Corinthians players would often wash in the park duck pond. The female ban was lifted in the 1960s, and the Corinthians took part in the first Women's Football Association event in London. Many of the Corinthians later moved into Manchester City W.F.C.. In 2023, the club house in Fog Lane Park was adorned with a mural commemorating the history of Manchester Corinthians, and a blue plaque was mounted.

== Layout and facilities ==
The park features several recreational facilities, such as sports areas and a children's play area. It also contains two lakes, grassland and woodland, as well as an area with wild flowers, which attracts wildlife.

== Location ==
Fog Lane Park is situated in the southern part of Manchester. It is easily accessible via public transport, with nearby stops including Burnage railway station and Didsbury Village tram stop.

History, flora and fauna of Fog Lane Park

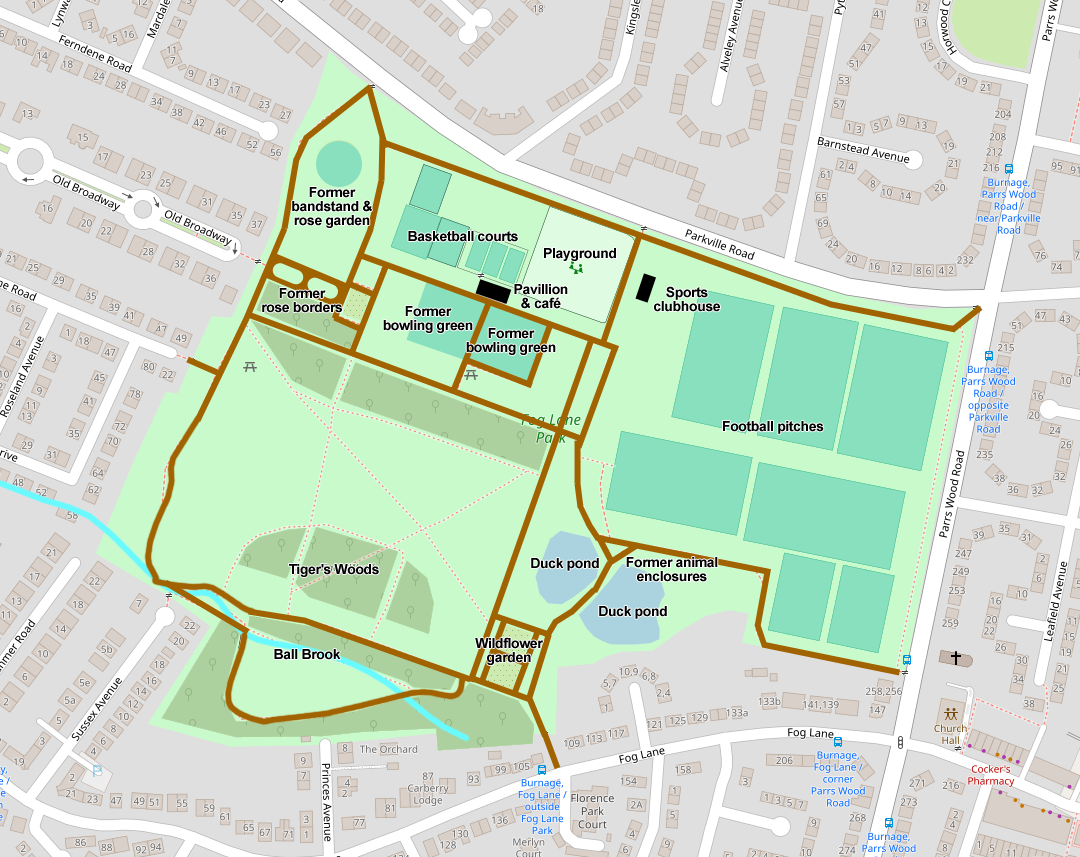
Fog Lane Park map

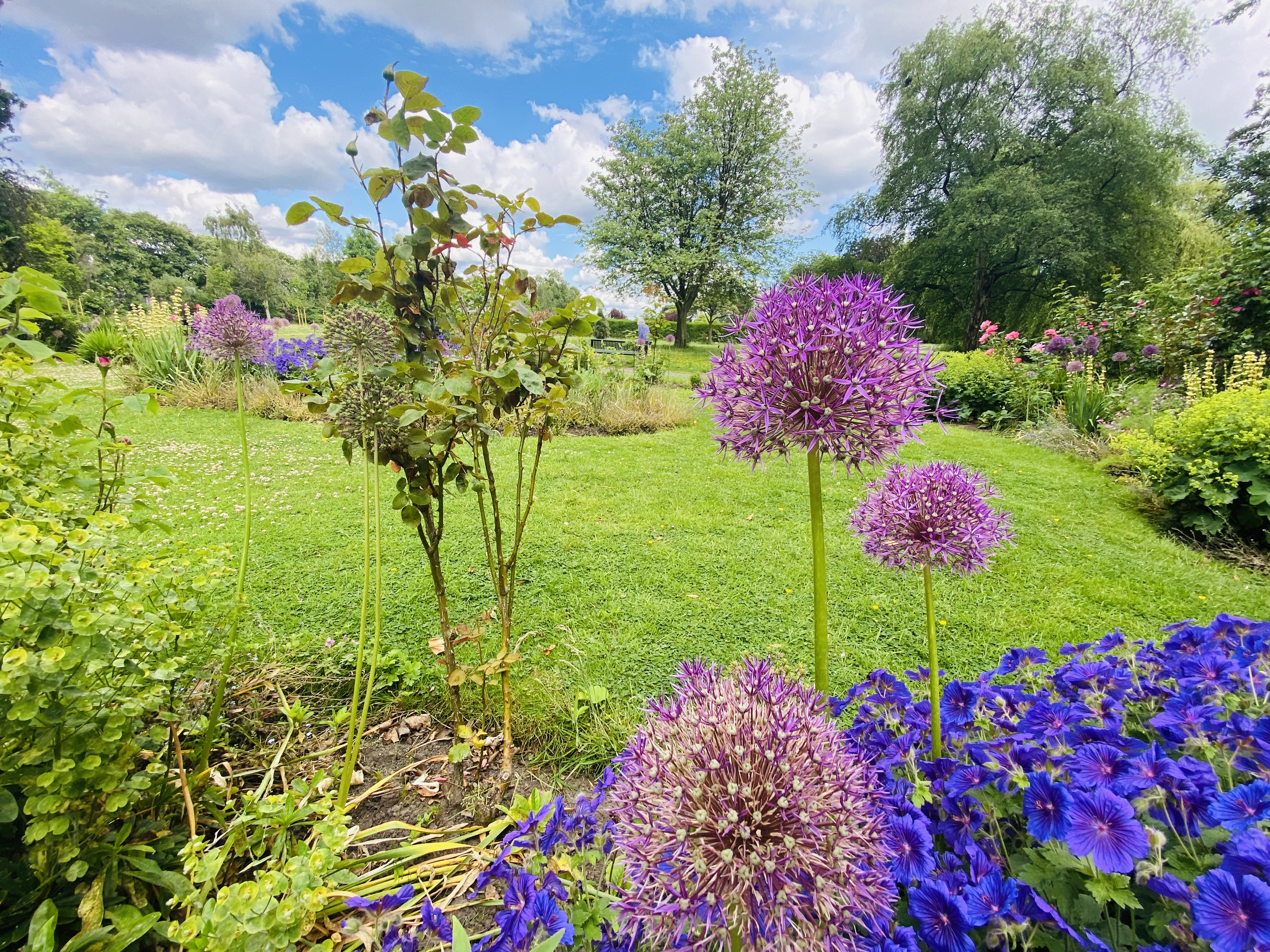
Ornamental planting in the park

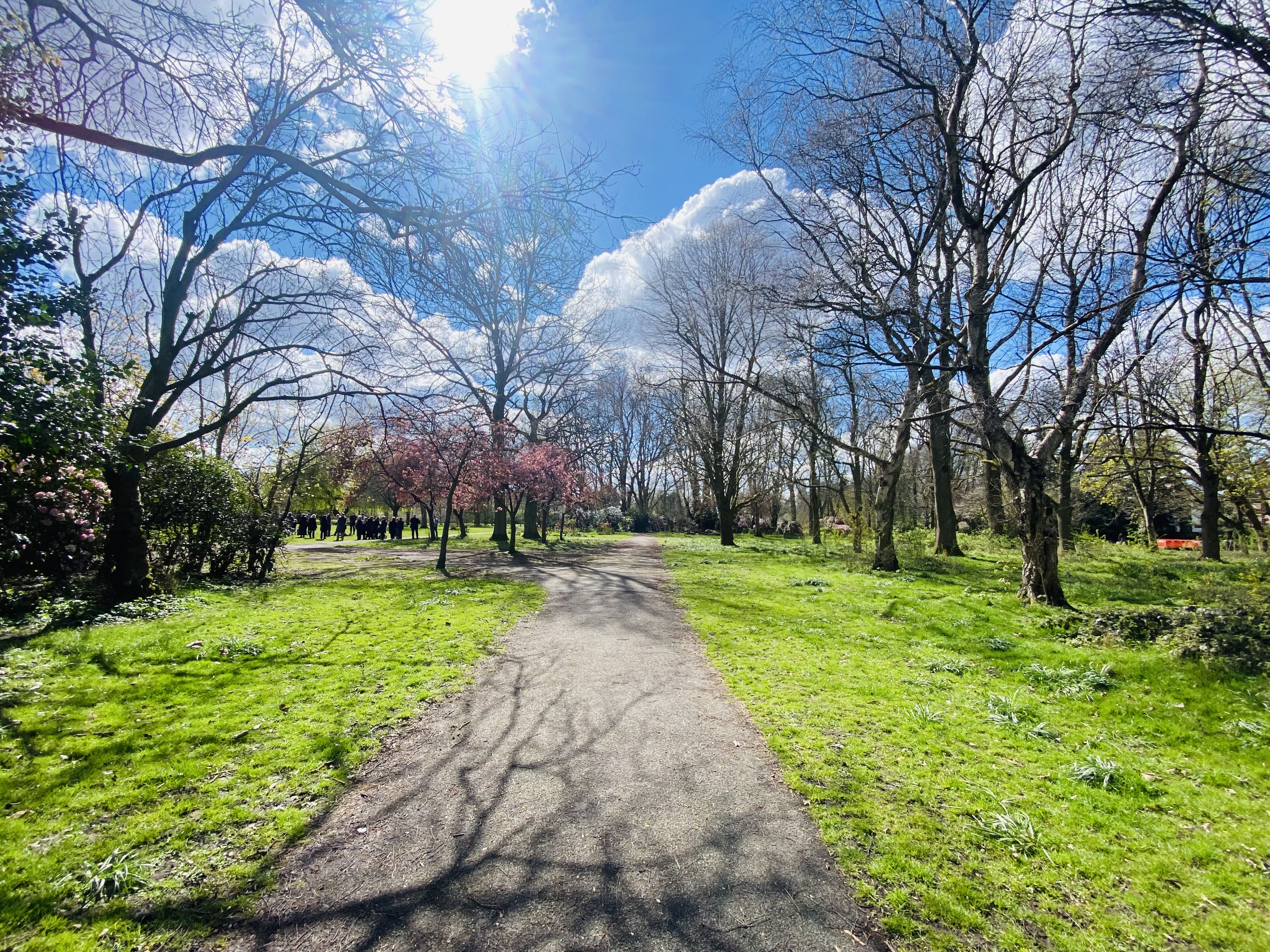
The park in spring

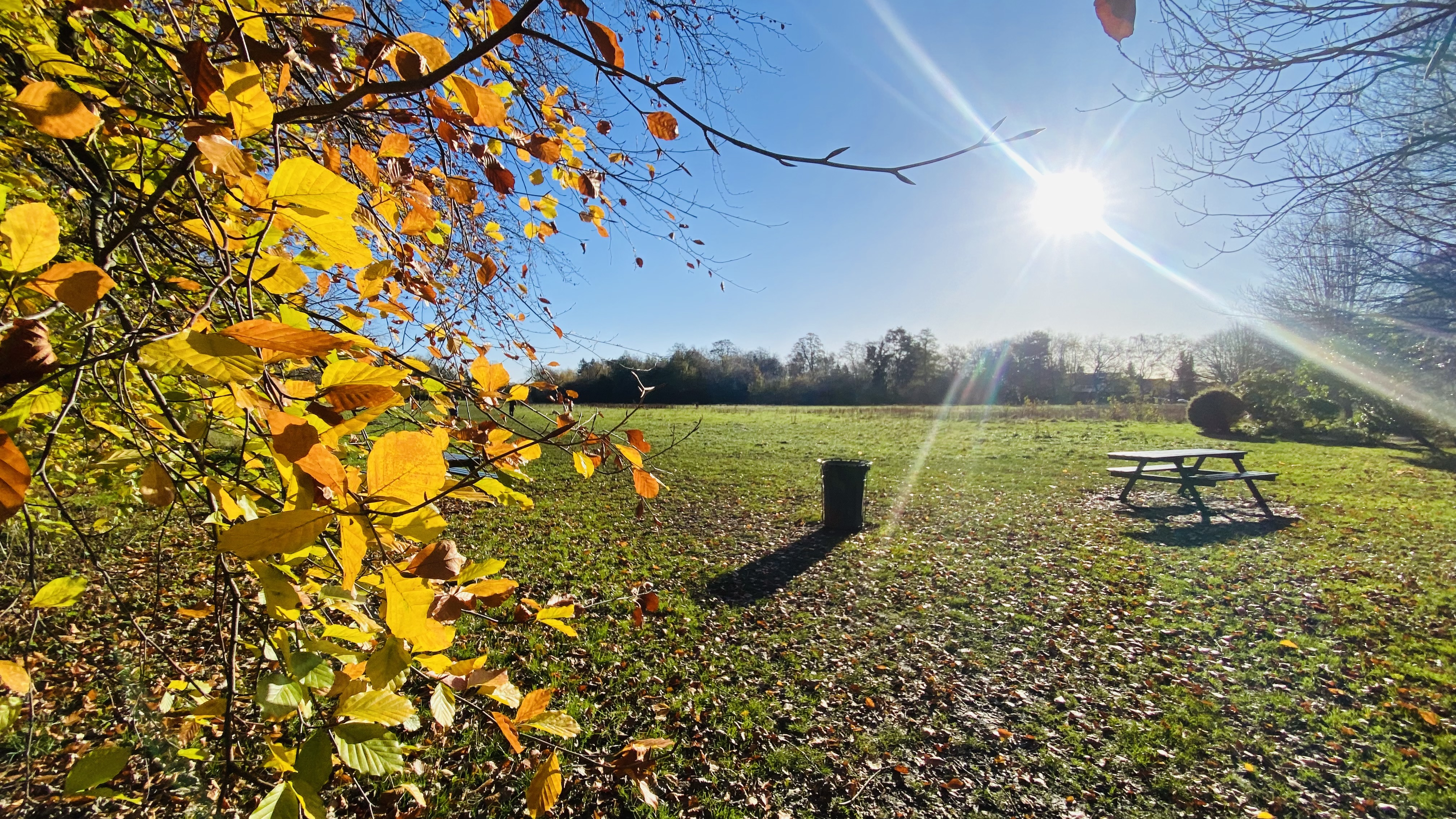
The park in autumn

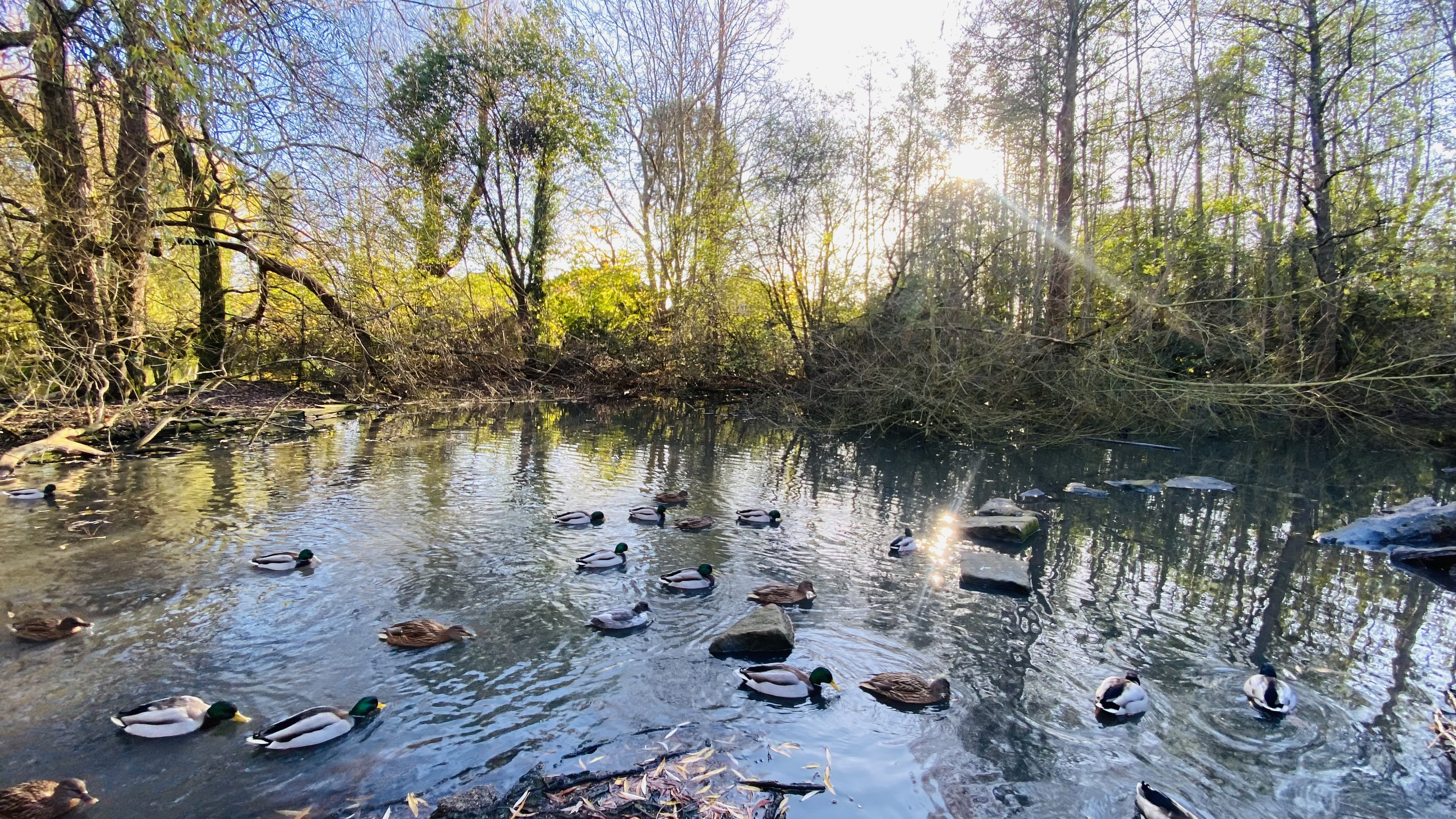
The duck pond

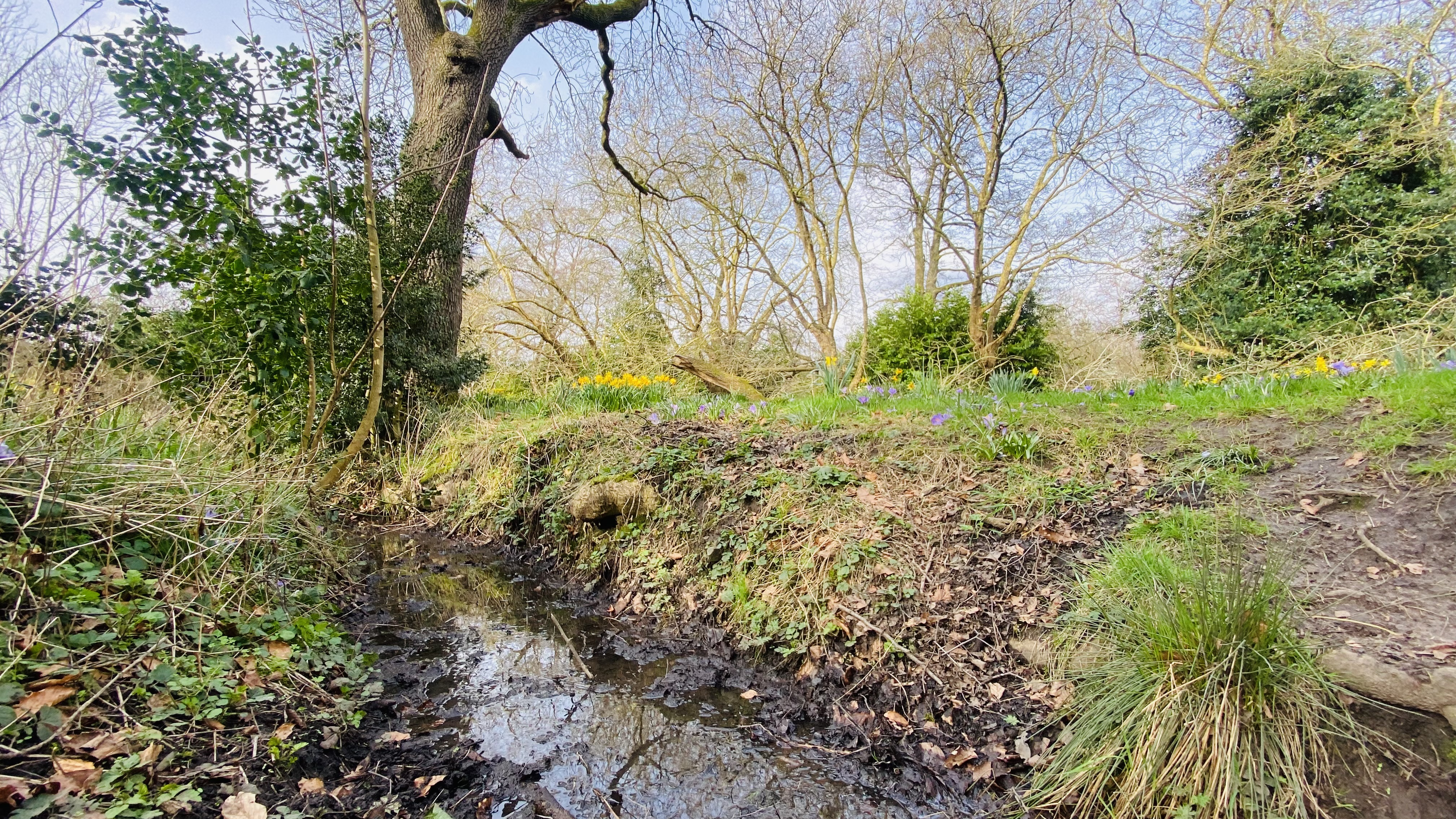
The Ball Brook flows through the park

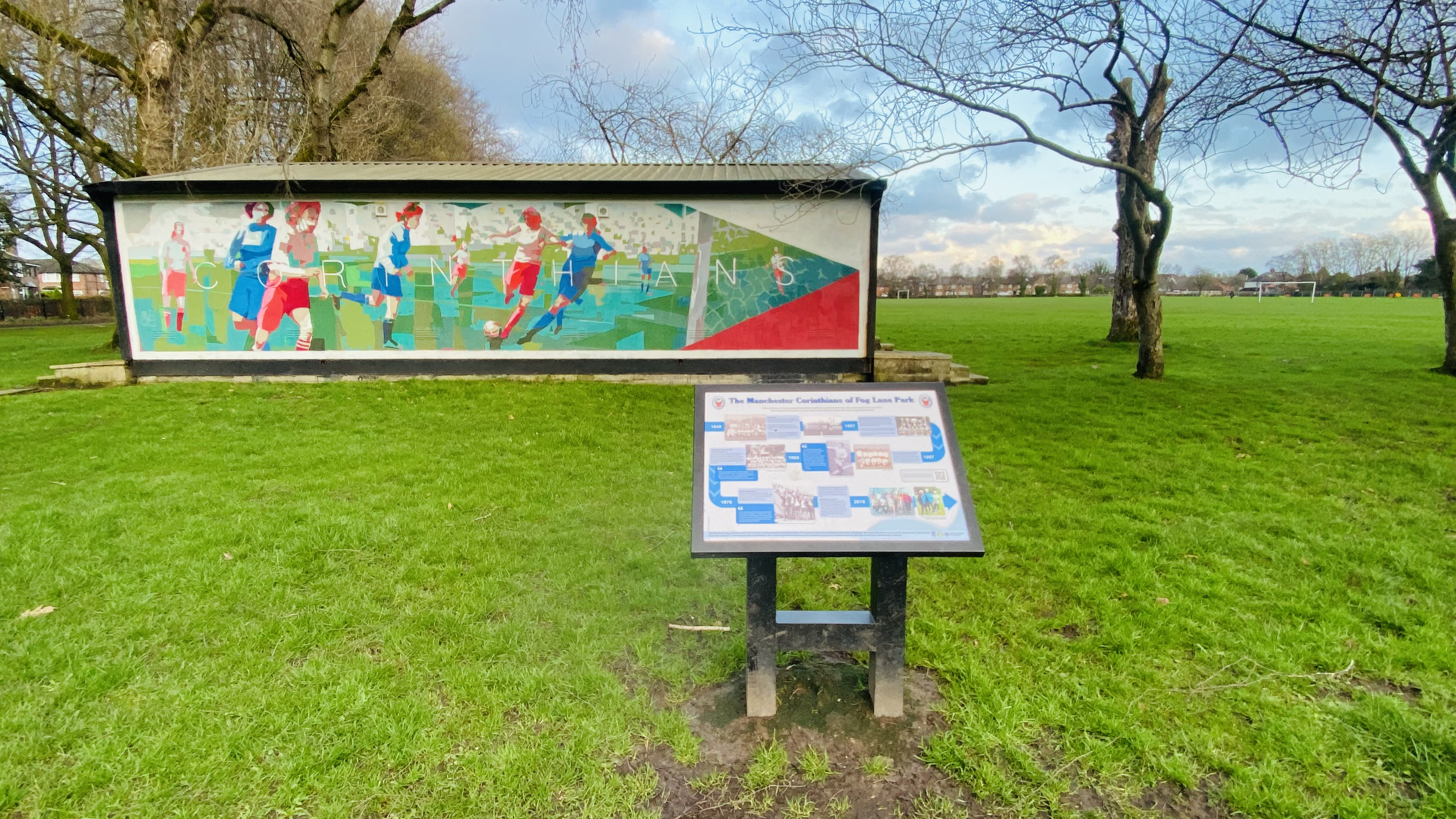
Mural commemorating the Manchester Corinthians L.F.C.

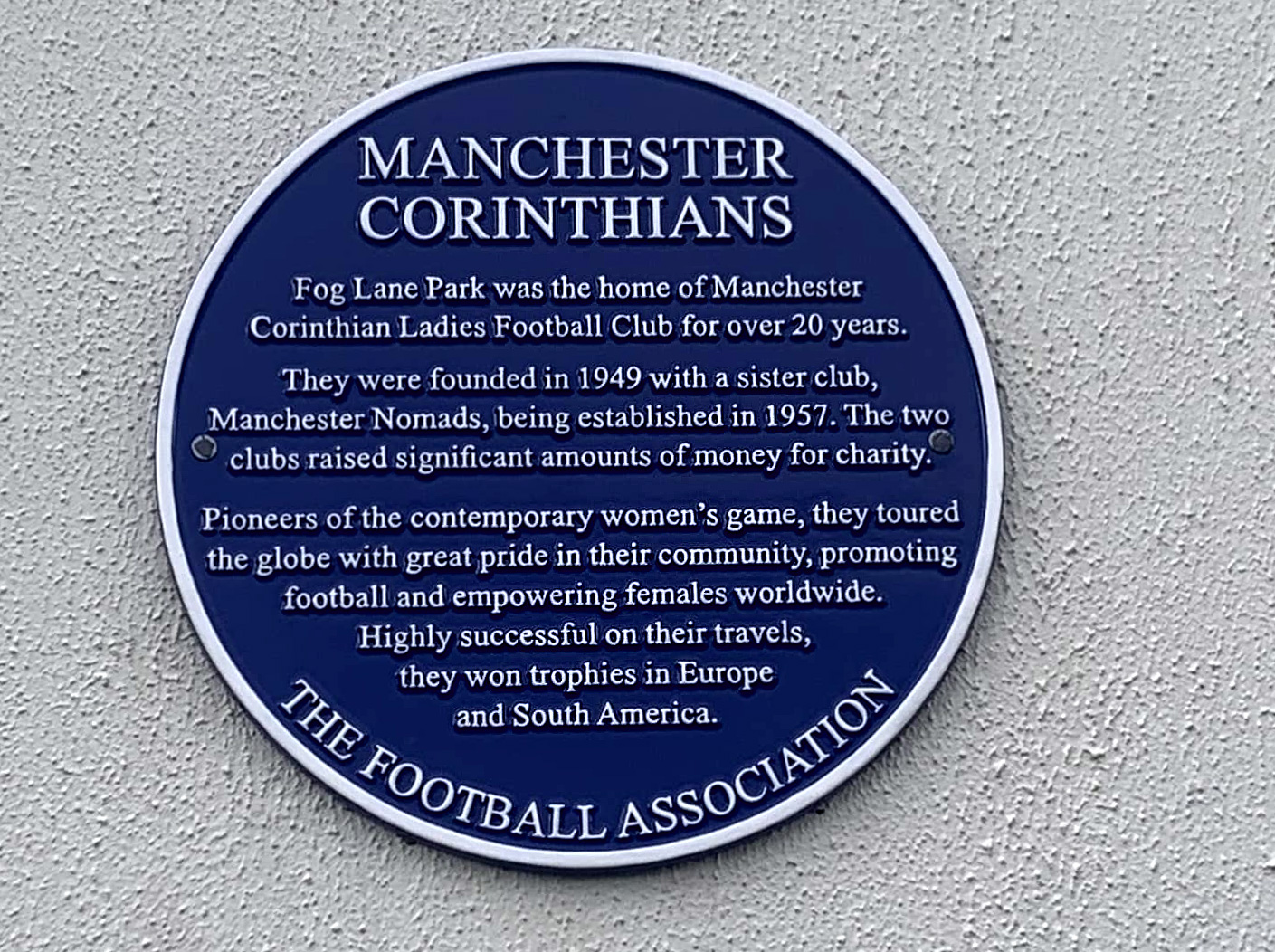
Blue plaque to Manchester Corinthians L.F.C.

== See also ==
- Fletcher Moss Botanical Garden
- Ladybarn Park
