= Red Lion, Withington =

Pub in Manchester, England

Red Lion
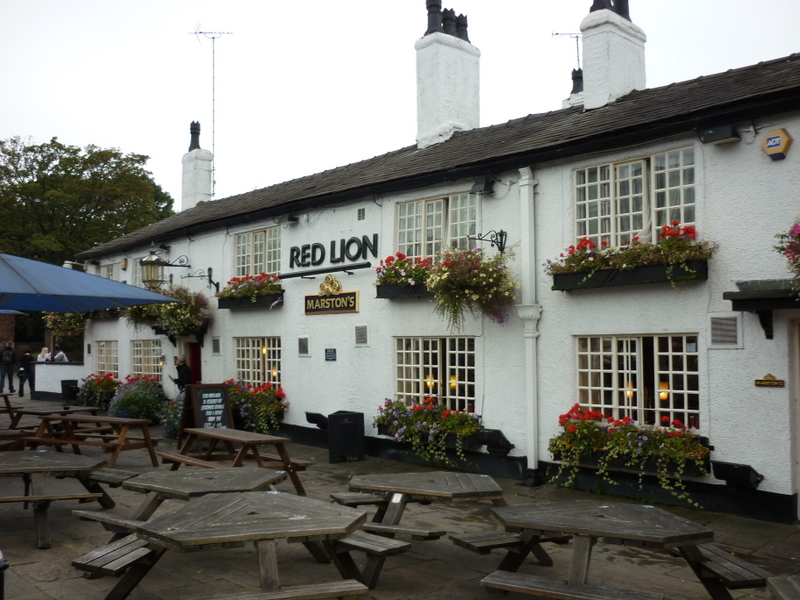
- The pub in 2011

- Location within Greater Manchester
- Alternative names: Red Lion Inn

General information
- Type: Public house
- Location: 532 Wilmslow Road, Withington, Manchester, England
- Coordinates: 53°25′52.8″N 2°13′44.5″W
- Year built: 17th century
- Renovated: 20th century (added) c. 2022 (refurbished)
- Owner: J.W. Lees

Design and construction
- Designations

Listed Building – Grade II
- Official name: Red Lion Inn
- Designated: 3 October 1974
- Reference no.: 1270511

Website
- redlionwithington.co.uk

The Red Lion is a Grade II listed public house on Wilmslow Road in Withington, a suburb of Manchester, England. Dating from the 17th century, it is thought to be the oldest surviving building in the suburb, having begun as a farmhouse or possibly a small group of cottages before later operating as an inn. Its location on a long‑established route between Manchester and the south contributed to its early use as a meeting place for the Withington court leet and the trustees of the Wilmslow Road turnpike. The building was incorporated into the Withington conservation area in 1983. It has had various owners, including crown green bowls player Noel Burrows in the mid‑20th century, and was acquired by J.W. Lees in 2020 before reopening after refurbishment in 2022.

== History ==
The Red Lion is thought to be the oldest surviving building in Withington. According to its official listing, it dates from the 17th century and began as a farmhouse; another source suggests it may have been a small group of cottages, before later functioning as an inn. Its position on one of the main historic routes from Manchester to the south, turnpiked in 1753 and likely in use since the medieval period, indicates that it may have taken on that role at an early stage. The building also hosted meetings of the Withington court leet and gatherings of the trustees responsible for the Wilmslow Road turnpike.

In the mid-20th century the pub was owned by the crown green bowls player Noel Burrows. On 3 October 1974, the Red Lion Inn was designated a Grade II listed building, and in 1983 the site was included within the newly established Withington conservation area.

In February 2020 it changed ownership, transferring from long‑term operation under Marston's to the local brewery J.W. Lees. It subsequently underwent refurbishment, reopening in 2022 and receiving permission to serve alcohol from an additional bar in the beer garden, which occupies the former bowling green.

== Architecture ==
The building is finished in white roughcast over brick and has a slate roof. It has a long, single‑depth layout with later 20th‑century additions at the rear. The front is two low storeys with six windows, and the ground floor has a sequence of doorways and windows arranged in the pattern w‑w‑d‑w‑w‑w‑d‑w. The doorways have simple modern weatherboards, and there is a later 20th‑century toilet window at the right end. All other windows on both floors are three‑light horizontal sliding sashes with small panes.

=== Interior ===
Inside, the ceilings are low and supported by three roughly finished 17th‑century beams: a single cross‑beam in the southern room and two lengthwise beams in the central room.

== See also ==
- Listed buildings in Manchester-M20
- Listed pubs in Manchester
