= Noel Burrows (bowls) =

English bowls player

Personal information
- Nationality: British (English)
- Born: 18 January 1944 (age 82) Manchester, England

Sport
- Sport: Bowls
- Club: Various
Medal record
Champion of Champions
Gold medal – first place	1978	singles
Gold medal – first place	1980	singles

Noel Burrows (born 18 January 1944) is an English crown green bowls player.

== Bowls career ==
Burrows achieved significant success in crown green bowls during the 1980s. His most notable achievement was winning the BCGBA Champion of Champions title, known simply as the Champions Trophy at the time, in 1978 and 1980. He also competed in various high-profile tournaments, including the Bowls Super Bowl and other national championships.

In the 1983 Embassy Champions final, Burrows was defeated by Stan Frith. He reached the semi-finals of the 1984 Super Bowl, competing against John Bell in a highly regarded match.

Burrows is remembered for his skill and dedication to crown green bowls. His contributions to the sport have inspired many players, and his name remains associated with one of the sport's most iconic tournaments. Burrows is listed as a life member of the Altrincham & South Manchester Bowling League. In 2010, Burrows won the All-England Merit at the age of 66.

Burrows won the BCGBA Senior Individual Merit in 1976 and 2010.

Burrows won the Waterloo Handicap two times in 1972 and 2004.

On 18 June 2023, Burrows won the Cheshire Veterans Merit for the 17th time, aged 79.

As of 10 February 2025, Burrows is still playing Bowls at a local Bowling Green in Westhoughton, Bolton. On 3 April 2025, a friend of Burrows confirmed as to why Burrows had been inactive for months by stating that Burrows had suffered "a tragic bereavement".

== Personal life ==
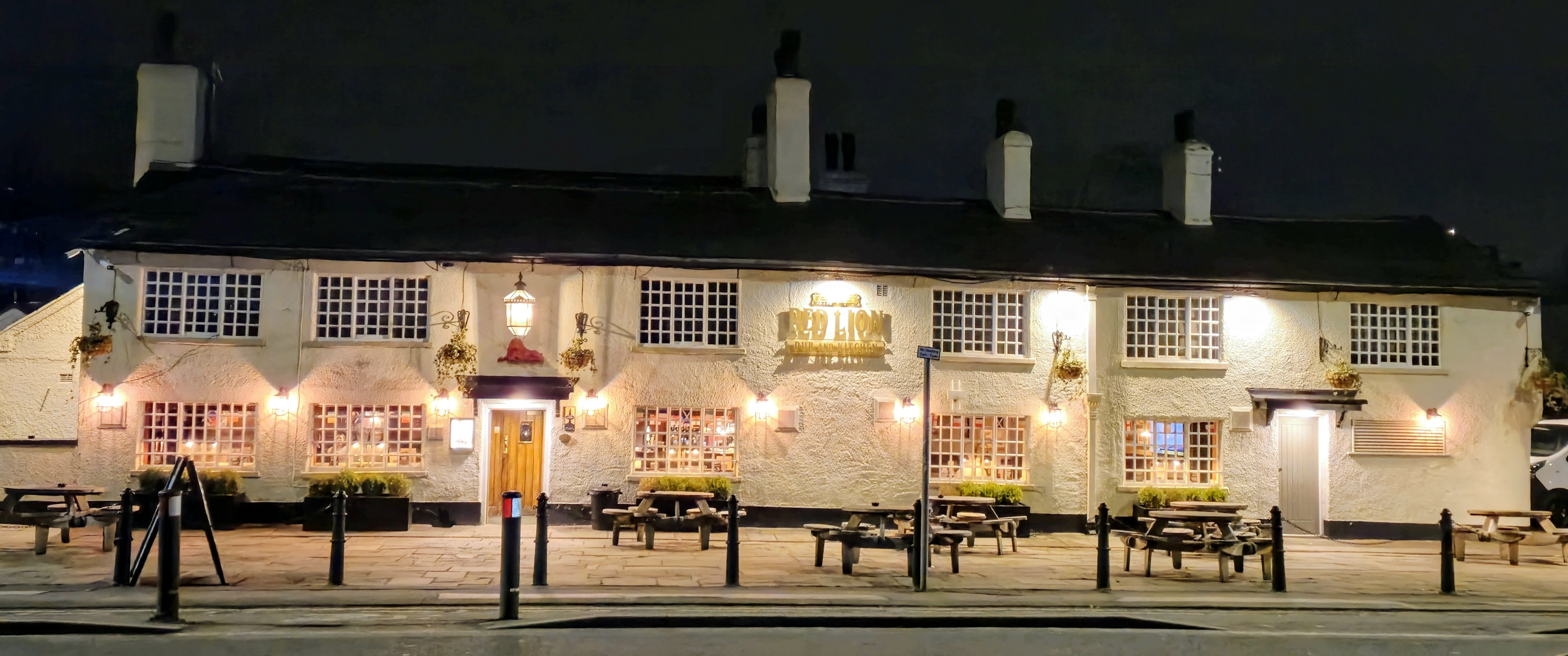
The Red Lion Pub in Withington

Outside of bowls, Burrows was the landlord of the 17th Century-Built Red Lion pub in Withington, Manchester, during the late 1970s and 1980s. The pub was well-known for its connection to bowls and became a hub for local players.
