= Making Space =

British charitable organization

Making Space is a charity established in Warrington in 1982 that provides services for people with mental health conditions and their carers. It has about 1000 employees.

It uses Earned Wage Access, which gives staff the chance to access their pay immediately and so avoid the stress of overdrafts.

It has 22 supported living apartments for rent in the historic Academy building on Bridge Street, Warrington. It also runs Psychological Wellbeing Services. During the COVID-19 pandemic in England the counselling and therapy services were forced to work on line, which proved to be more effective.

Its hospital Monet Lodge in Withington was put in special measures by the Care Quality Commission in May 2021.

It runs a supported housing scheme in Bury, Greater Manchester.

It took over Footsteps, a charity supporting families affected by substance dependency in St Helens, Merseyside in 2021 as its first subsidiary.
