= Lee Marland =

English cricketer (born 1975)

Personal information
- Full name: Lee John Marland
- Born: 21 September 1975 (age 51); Withington, Manchester, England
- Batting: Right-handed
- Bowling: Right-arm off break

Domestic team information
- Years: Team
- 2002: Warwickshire Cricket Board
- 1998–1999: Cheshire

Career statistics
Competition	LA
Matches	1
Runs scored	39
Batting average	39.00
100s/50s	–/–
Top score	39
Balls bowled	–
Wickets	–
Bowling average	–
5 wickets in innings	–
10 wickets in match	–
Best bowling	–
Catches/stumpings	1/–
- Source: Cricinfo, 25 October 2010

Lee John Marland (born 21 September 1975) is an English cricketer. Marland is a right-handed batsman who bowled right-arm off break. He was born at Withington, Manchester.

== Biography ==
Marland made his Minor Counties Championship debut for Cheshire against Wales Minor Counties in 1998. He played 2 further Championship matches for the county against Herefordshire in 1998 and Wiltshire in 1999.

Marland represented the Warwickshire Cricket Board in a single List A match against Herefordshire in the 1st round of the 2003 Cheltenham & Gloucester Trophy which was held in 2002. In his only List A match, he scored 39 runs and took a single catch.
