= Cine City, Withington =

Former cinema in Withington, England

Cine City
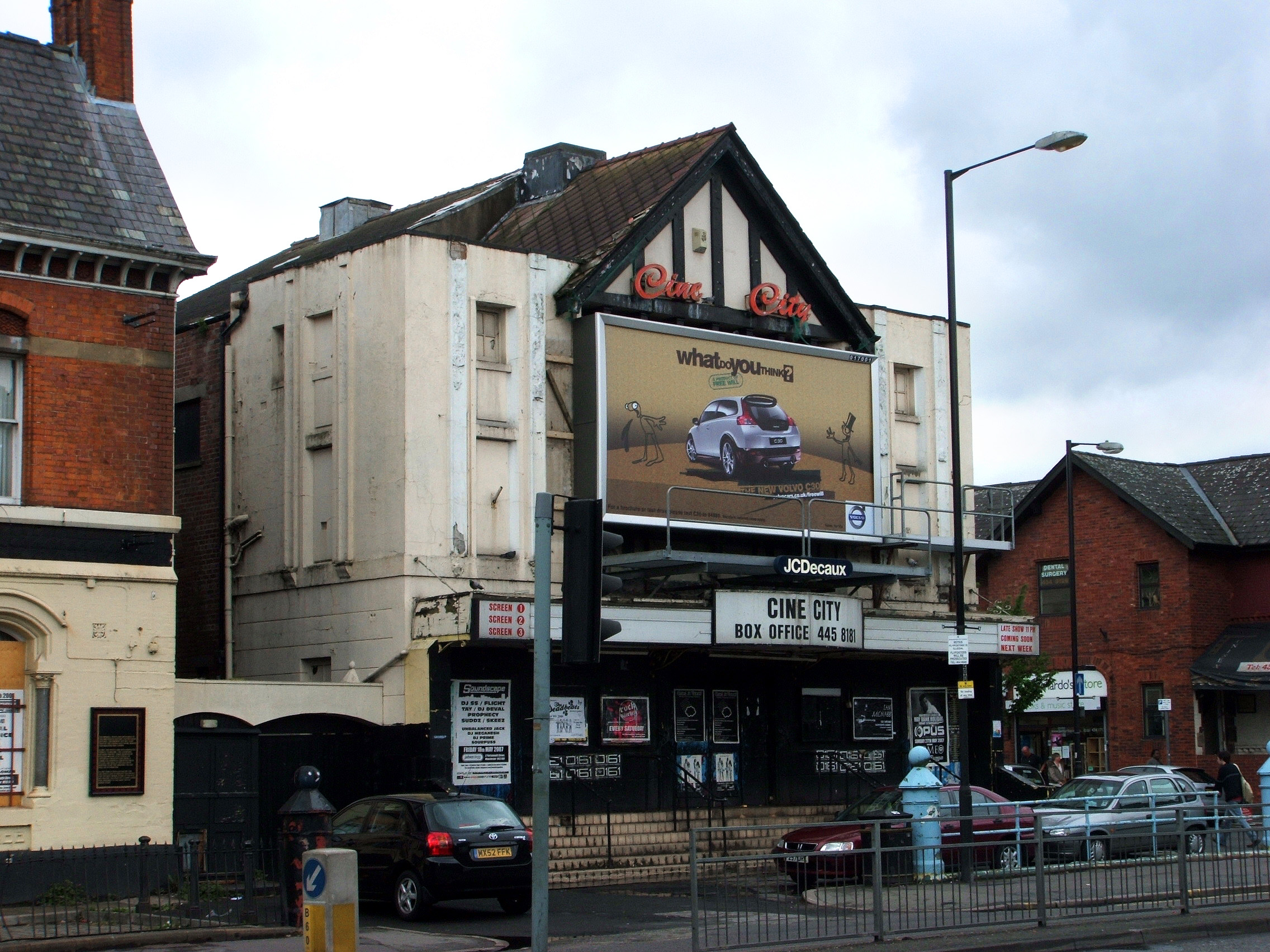
- Cine City in 2004
- Interactive map of the Cine City area
- Former names: The Scala; Scala Electric Palace; Scala Palace Cinema.

General information
- Type: Cinema
- Architectural style: Tudor Revival.
- Location: 494 Wilmslow Road, Withington, Manchester, M20 3BG
- Coordinates: 53°26′01″N 2°13′45″W
- Completed: 1912
- Demolished: 2008
- Owner: Mohammad Jamil; Arrows International Limited

Cine City (originally named the Scala Cinema) was a cinema in Withington, Manchester, England located at 494 Wilmslow Road, Withington, Manchester, M20 3BG. It opened in 1912 as The Scala, and was the third cinema to open in Britain. When the popularity of picture houses reached its peak in the 1930s, The Scala was one of 109 cinemas in Manchester.

During the Second World War, the cinema escaped with minor damage when the road outside was hit by a small bomb in 1940. After the war, television led to a decline in cinema attendances, and by 1965, only 40 cinemas remained in Manchester. Cine City closed in July 2001, making it the third-longest running cinema in England.

By 2005 the building was in a bad state of repair, and was threatened with demolition. Although heritage groups won a stay of execution, the cinema was demolished in spring 2008. A new residential building has been constructed on the site.

== History ==
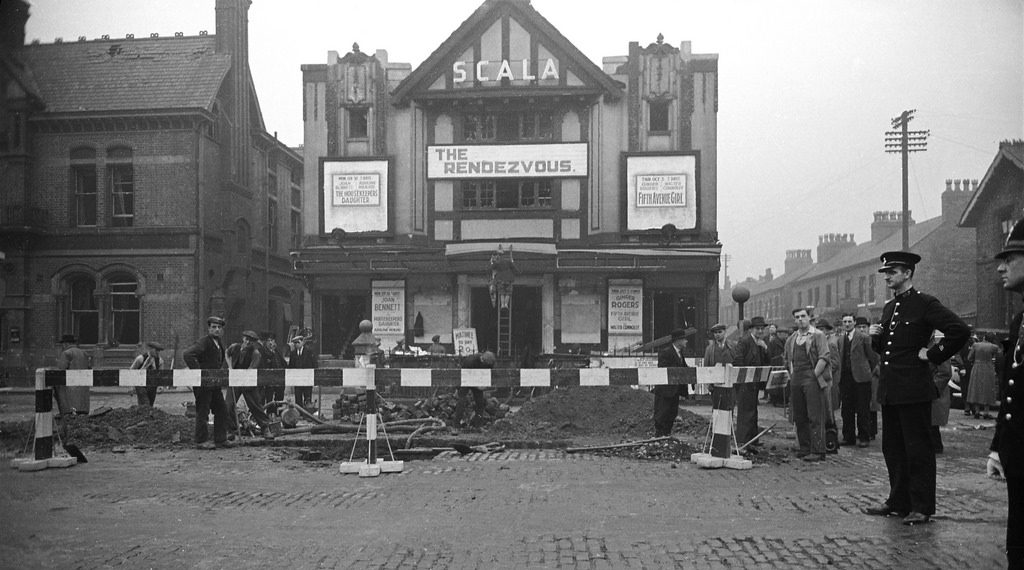
Workers clear up bomb damage in front of the Scala Cinema during the Manchester Blitz, October 1940

The cinema is thought to have opened around 1912 as The Scala. A company called The Scala Electric Palace (Withington) Ltd was registered in 1912, and in the 1914 Yearbook of Kinematograph Weekly the cinema is listed as having opened in January 1913 as The Scala Picturedrome. It was the third cinema to open in Britain, and by the time of its closure in 2001 it was the third longest-running cinema in the country. Its original single-screen auditorium had been fitted with 675 seats. Before the advent of "talkies", the Scala had a resident female cinema pianist, and the conductor Sir John Barbirolli once played the piano to accompany the silent films. Violet Carson, who went on to play Ena Sharples in Coronation Street, was also a resident pianist. During the 1930s the popularity of the new "picture houses" grew rapidly, with 109 in Manchester at its peak. Many people visited The Scala three or four times a week. The craze for cinema-going was seen by some as a social ill of its time; school teachers complained that pupils were not doing their homework because they were spending too much time at the cinema. One regular movie-goer at the cinema in the 1920s was Robert Donat, a child at the time, who went on to become an Oscar-winning actor. Howard Spring, a novelist who was based in Manchester, once described it as "the most comfortable cinema in the country".

During the Manchester Blitz of World War II, a small bomb fell onto Wilmslow Road in front of the cinema on the night of 1 October 1940. The cinema (which at the time was screening The Housekeeper's Daughter and 5th Ave Girl) survived with minor damage, although it had to close for a few weeks while repairs were completed.

During the 1950s, the Scala was frequented by the American writer Daniel Ford, then a student at the University of Manchester. In his autobiographical work, Poland's Daughter: How I Met Basia, Hitchhiked to Italy, and Learned About Love, War, and Exile, Ford describes sitting in the smoke-filled auditorium watching films starring Dirk Bogarde, Jack Hawkins and Alec Guinness.

After the war, the popularity of cinemas waned as more people acquired televisions, and by 1965 there were only 40 cinemas left in Manchester. During the 1970s, The Scala was renamed Cine City and its single-screen auditorium was divided into three cinema screens. In 1991, Cine City was used as a filming location for Episode 3324 of Coronation Street.

Early in his career, film writer Mark Kermode visited Cine City, and in his book, The Good, the Bad and the Multiplex, he reminisces about seeing Jaws 3-D there.

In May 1996 a plaque at Manchester's oldest cinema was unveiled by Caroline Aherne, recognising Violet Carson and John Barbirolli, who both played piano accompaniment to silent films in the cinema in the 1920s.

Cine City was threatened with closure in 1997 when Geoff Henshaw, the owner at the time, died. It was purchased for around £200,000 by David Babsky, who kept the cinema open until July 2001, when it closed due to competition from a new multiplex cinema in nearby East Didsbury.

== Closure and redevelopment ==
After the cinema closed, it was purchased by Develop UK, and several attempts were made to turn the building into a Wetherspoons pub. However these were rejected by the council twice, once in the initial planning application, and also in a subsequent appeal. The application was denied due to the moratorium on new food and drink licences in Withington, part of the town's unitary development plan. In 2002 the building was purchased by Arrows International. They applied for planning permission in December 2002 to demolish part of the cinema, reconstructing it as five ground floor shops, with 21 flats on the upper floors. These plans were withdrawn as they were seen as overdeveloping the site.

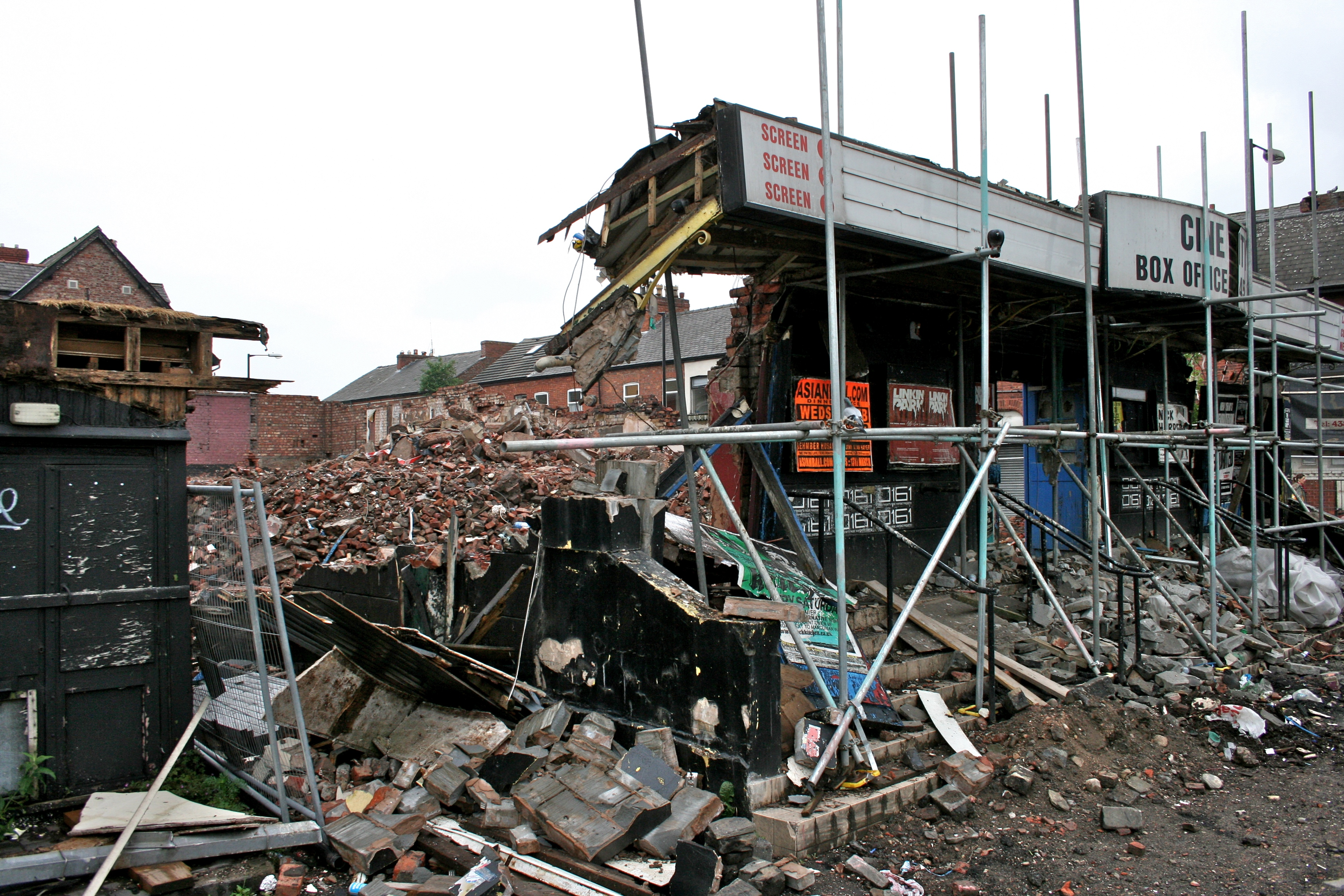
Cine City during demolition

In 2003 the site was purchased by property developer Mohammad Jamil, who runs the Britannia Property Group. When they purchased the site, Cine City was regarded as "too far gone", so it was decided that it should be demolished and a new building constructed in its place. A campaign to save the building was started in 2002 by the actor and comedian John Thomson, but it ended in failure six years later, when it was realised that refurbishing the existing building would cost around £6 million.

As of 2005, the building still retained a number of original features, including its gold brocade seats, wall friezes, cornices, and ceiling roses. However, the fabric of the building remained in a poor state of repair, and in January 2008 it was announced once again that the building was to be demolished, and scaffolding was erected at the front in preparation. The building, once considered amongst the most iconic in Manchester, was not regarded as architecturally interesting, and was demolished in the spring of 2008. The pair of stone piers in the forecourt of the building, which were Grade II listed in 1998, remain.

== Replacement building ==
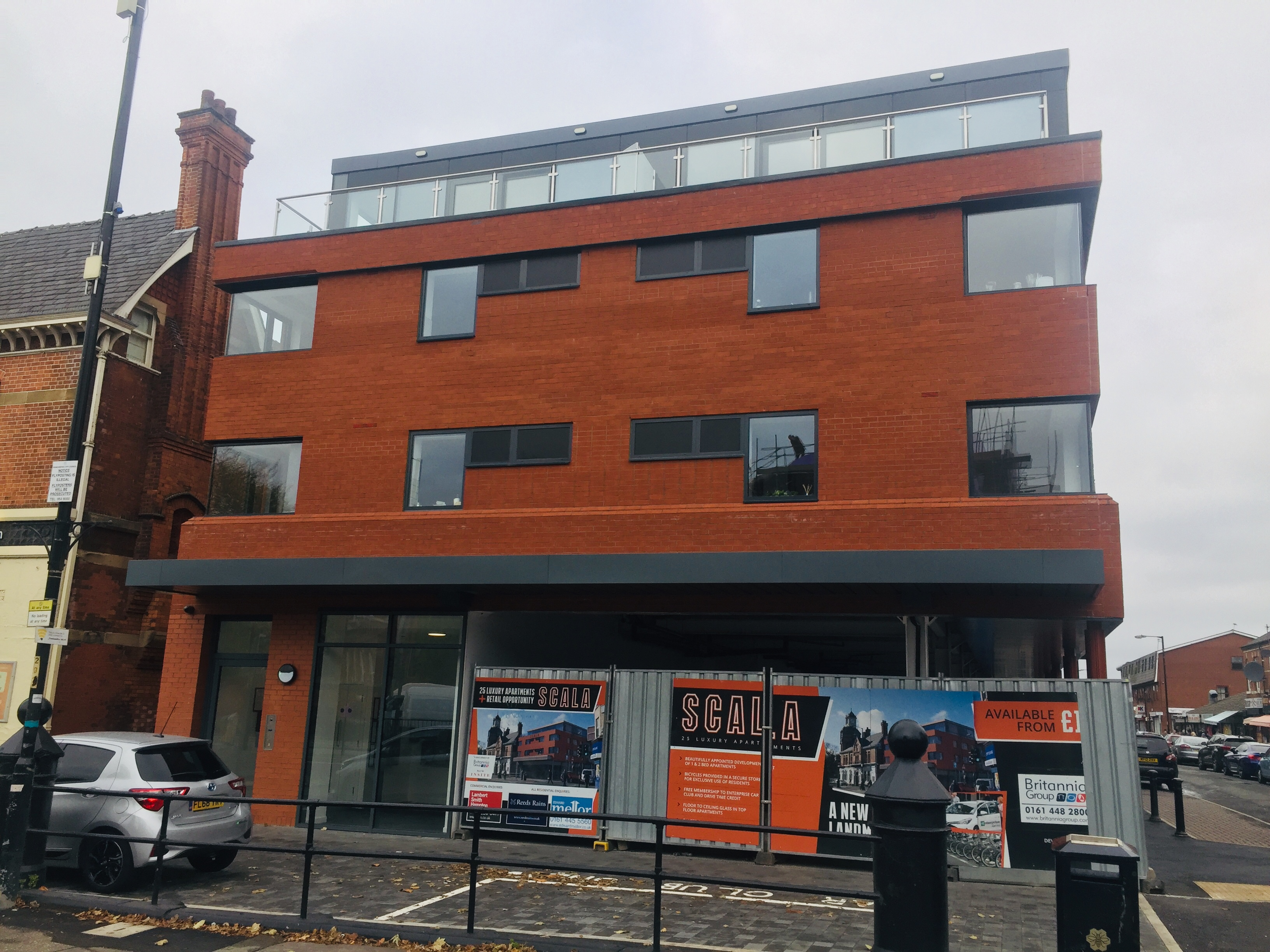
The Scala Apartments (2018), named after the original picture house

Plans for a new building on the site went through several iterations. The first design consisted of a six-storey building (including basement), which had a large shop on the ground floor, as well as an underground car park and four floors of residential apartments, with a top level to hold the building's mechanics. Each floor would have 4,000 square feet (372 m^{2}), and there would have been a leaning tower to the side of the building. The design was given planning permission in 2005.

A revised design turned the mezzanine floor into an area that could be used as an arts venue, cinema, music auditorium or conference room for 120 to 150 people. New plans cost £60,000. However this new design was deemed to be unworkable. A further design consisted of another six-storey building with a large ground-floor shop, a first-storey car park, and four floors of flats. This would have been half a metre less in height than the previous design, and did not include the tower. The plan was initially rejected by the council, but was subsequently approved in April 2008, before being rejected by the Planning Inspectorate. Several later applications for the site were also rejected, particularly due to concerns over parking, and the site lay vacant.

After 15 years a development scheme was approved to construct a block of flats called the Scala Apartments, named after the original picture house. The Scala Apartments were completed in 2018.
