= St Paul's Church, Withington =

St Paul's Withington
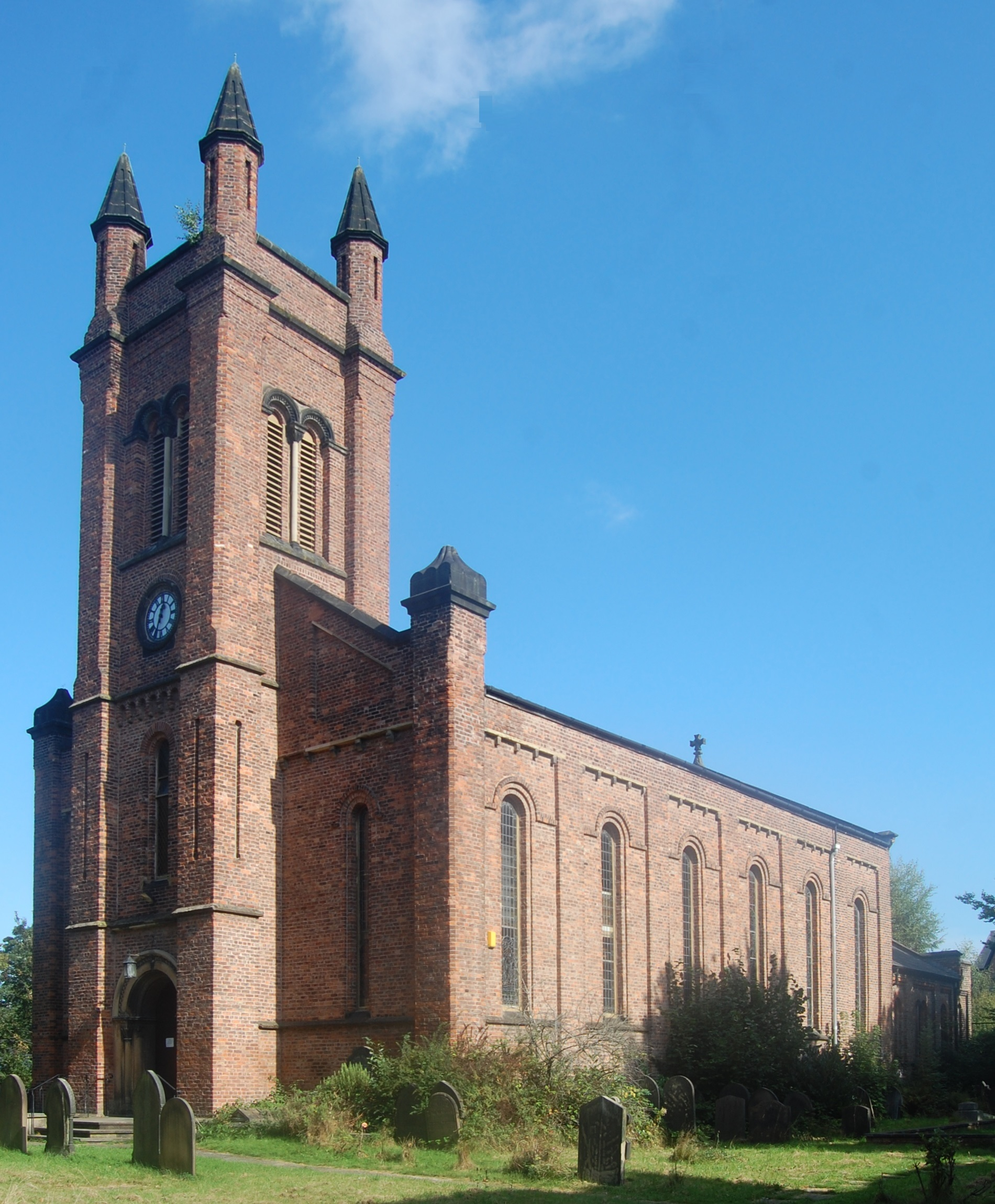
- The church in September 2021

- Location within Greater Manchester
- 53.43254°N 2.22794°W
- OS grid reference: SJ 84950 92884
- Location: Manchester, North-West England
- Country: England
- Denomination: Church of England
- Website: www.stpaulswithington.org.uk

History
- Founded: 1841

Architecture
- Heritage designation: Grade II listed
- Designated: 1988
- Architect(s): Hayley & Brown
- Style: Neo-Norman

Specifications
- Materials: Red brick

Administration
- Province: York
- Diocese: Manchester
- Archdeaconry: Manchester
- Deanery: Withington
- Parish: Withington

St Paul's Church, Withington is a Grade II listed Church of England parish church in the suburb of Withington, Manchester, in the United Kingdom. It is located on Wilmslow Road, and has an associated Church of England primary school.

Worship at St Paul's consists of traditional Holy Communion (Book of Common Prayer and Common Worship) and occasional services of Choral Evensong or evening prayer in support of L'Arche in Manchester.

== History ==
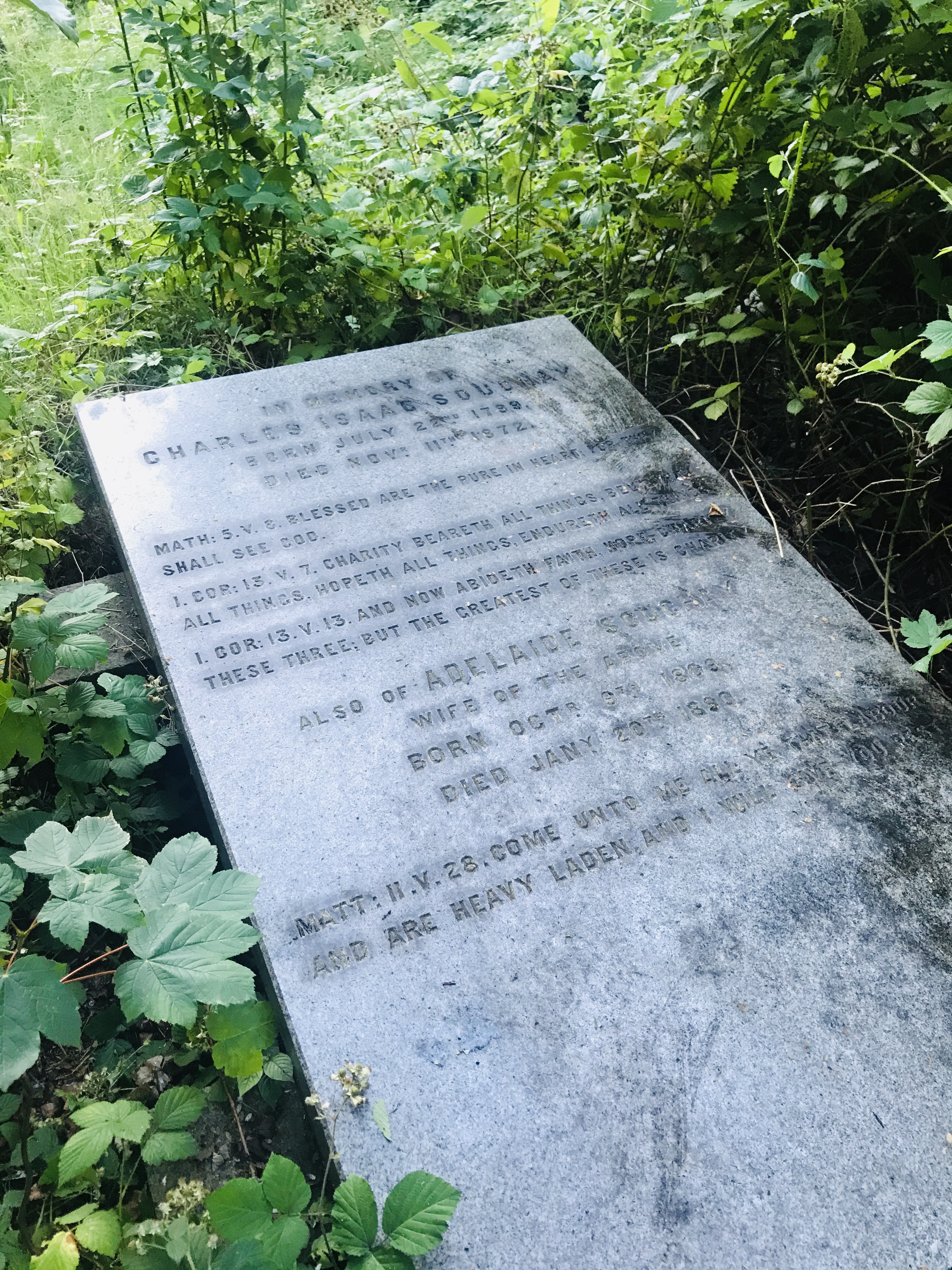
The Souchay family grave in St Paul's churchyard

St Paul's was built in 1841, when Withington was growing from a small Lancashire village into an urban district of Manchester. Prior to the establishment of St Paul's, the nearest Anglican place of worship to Withington was at the Church of St James, Didsbury. St Paul's was built on land donated by Wilbraham Egerton, 1st Earl Egerton to provide a place of worship for local people of Withington. The church was designed by the Mancunian architectural firm Hayley & Brown, who also built a number of churches around North-West England.

Soon after the foundation of St Paul's, a school was established next to the church in 1844, St Paul's Primary School, also on land donated by Lord Egerton.

In April 1847, during a visit to Manchester, the composer Felix Mendelssohn visited St Paul's to play the newly installed pipe organ. According to a churchwarden's 1896 account, Mendelssohn "played a service and gave a recital upon the organ and it was pronounced by him to be an excellent instrument". Mendelssohn's Manchester tour also included an organ recital at St Luke's Church, Cheetham. The composer had family and social connections with Withington; the first wedding to take place at St Paul's was that of a cousin of Mendelssohn's wife Cécile, and another cousin was married here in 1864.

== Architecture ==
The church is built of red brick with stone coping. Its most prominent feature is a high clock tower with square buttresses and four pinnacles. The exterior has some Neo-Norman features, notably tall, rounded-headed lancet windows and a neo-Norman west door whose arch is carved with dog-tooth ornamentation.

The building was extended in 1863 by J. Lowe, adding a chancel, a southern chancel aisle and organ chamber above, supported by Romanesque arches with foliated capitals. In 1921 the chancel aisle was converted into a war memorial chapel and a small apse was built onto the east end of the chapel. The interior was renovated in the 1970s, but retains some original Victorian fittings.

The stained glass includes three lights at the east end by Ward and Hughes, and in the nave are two 1901 windows by local glassmaker Walter J. Pearce: a depiction of a young Queen Victoria and a stained-glass copy of Holman Hunt's Light of the World painting. In the chapel are four small windows commemorating the fallen of World War I, including a window dedicated to 15 former members of the Sunday school who were killed in action.

There are several wall memorials in the church. The oldest memorial is dedicated to Robert Tebbut, a benefactor of St Paul's who died in 1842, the year after the foundation of the church; the inscription reads, "to whose efforts the erection of this church is mainly due, and who is, alas! the first tenant of its vaults."

The churchyard has many Victorian headstones. A solid oak lych gate was installed in 1894 at the entrance to the churchyard, donated by local philanthropist Clayton Chorlton. In 2007 the gates were stolen during a Sunday morning service.

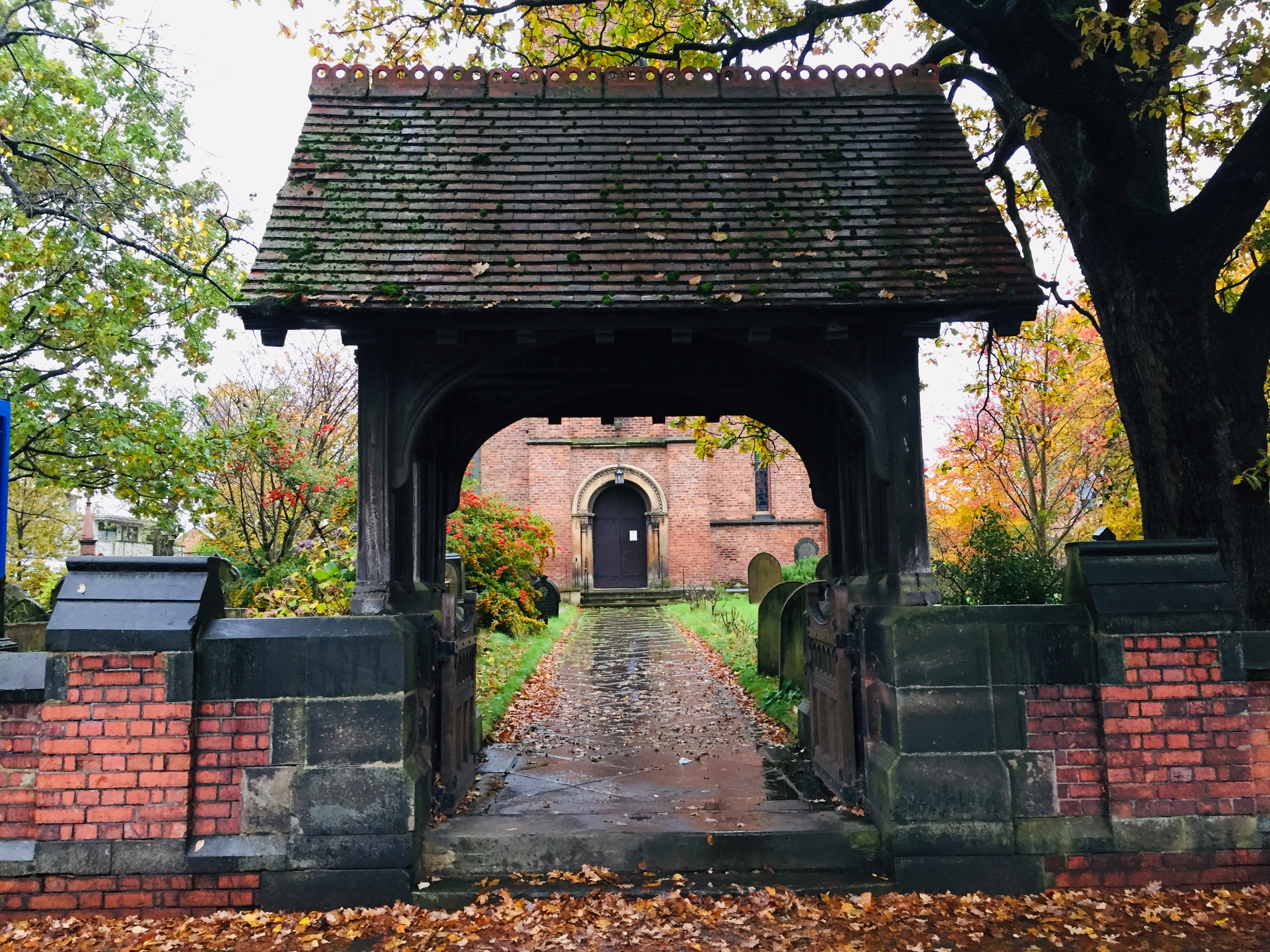
The 1894 lych gate

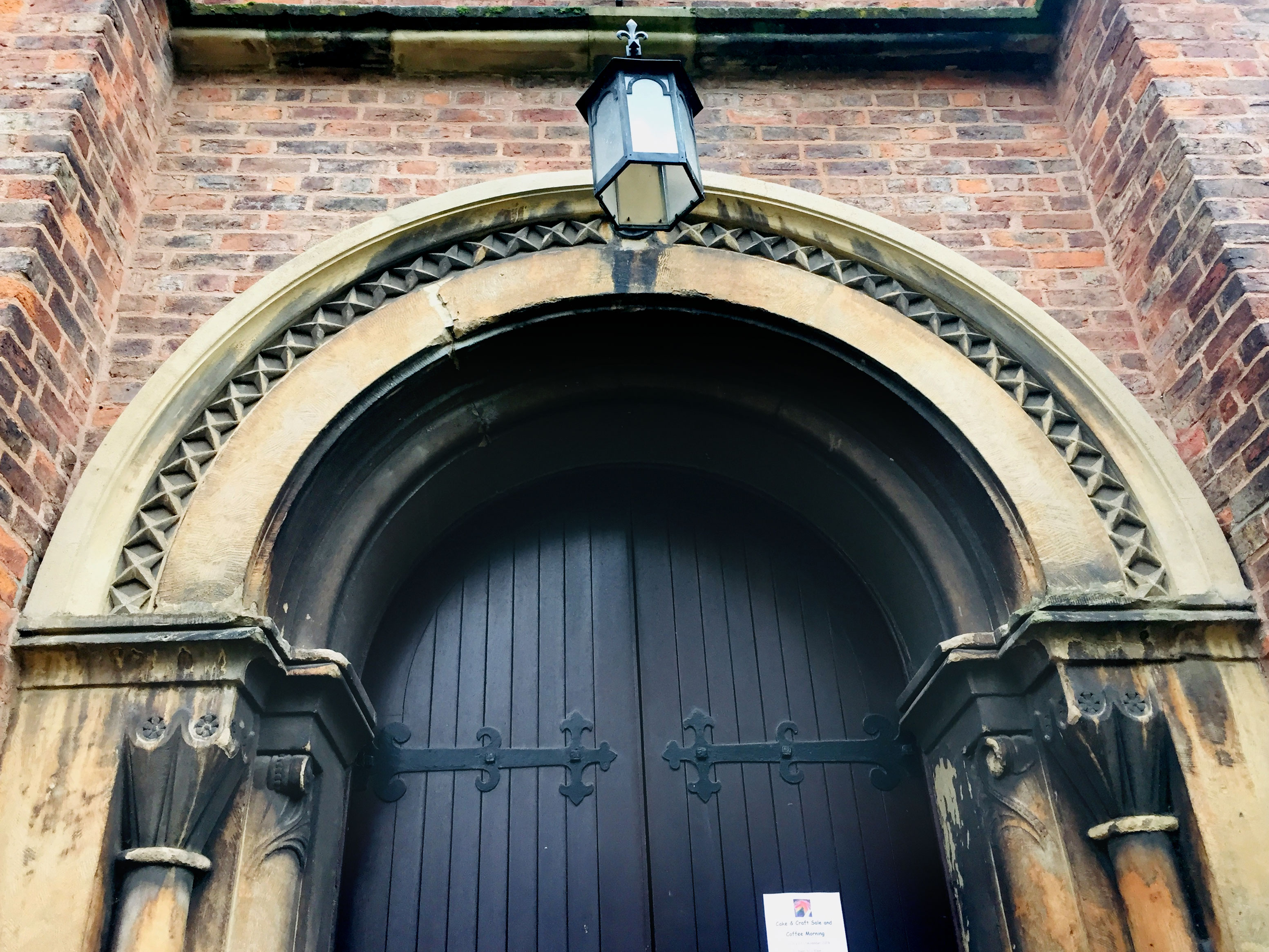
Dog-tooth ornamentation above the Neo-Norman west door

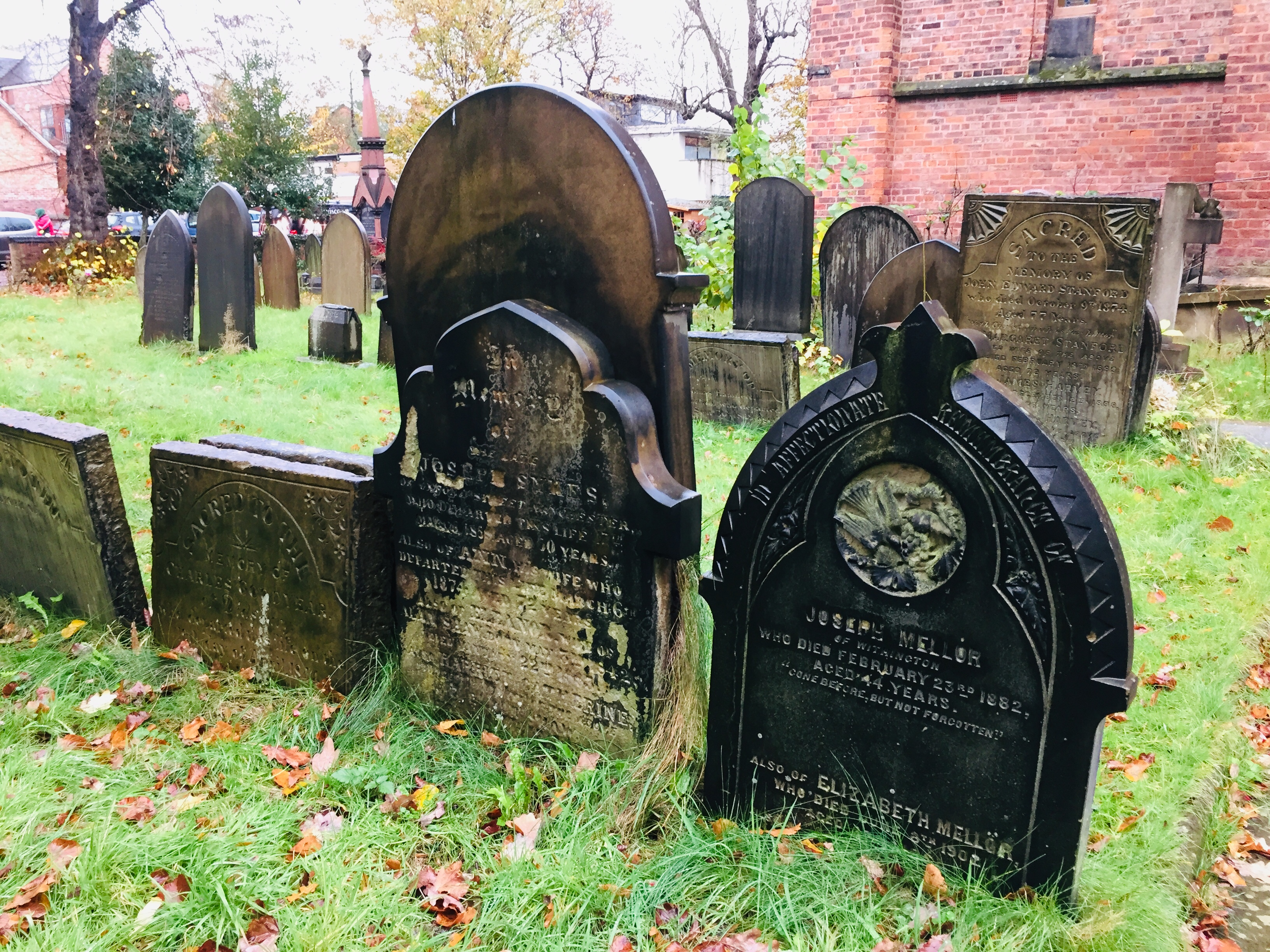
Ornate Victorian graves in the churchyard
