= Withington Town Hall =

Municipal building in Withington, Greater Manchester, England

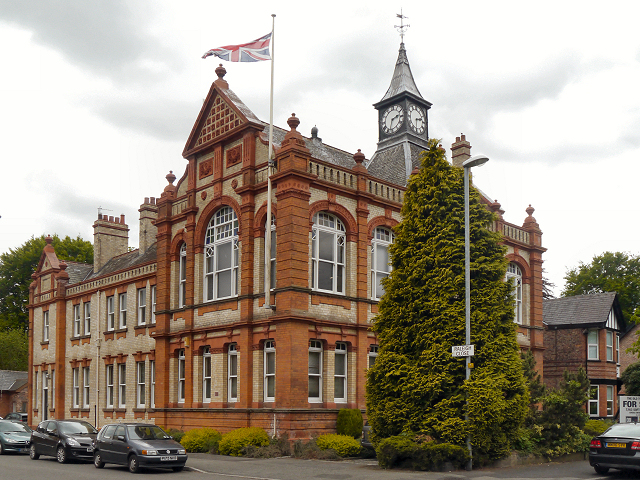
- The building in 2018

- Shown in Greater Manchester
- 53.4259°N 2.2379°W
- Location: Lapwing Lane, Withington

History
- Built: 1881

Site notes
- Architect: Lawrence Booth
- Architectural style: Baroque Revival style

Listed Building – Grade II
- Official name: Former Withington Town Hall
- Designated: 5 November 1990
- Reference no.: 1291512

Withington Town Hall, also known as West Didsbury Town Hall, is a former municipal building on Lapwing Lane, Withington, a suburb of Manchester in North West England. The building, which served as the offices and meeting place of Withington Urban District Council and now accommodates a firm of solicitors, is a Grade II listed building.

== History ==
Following significant population growth, largely associated with the textile industry, a local board of health was established in Withington in 1876. The new board decided to commission a venue for their meetings: the site they selected, on the south side of Lapwing Lane, was occupied by Lapwing Farm. The new building was designed by Lawrence Booth in the Baroque Revival style, built in buff brick with stone dressings at a cost of £2,000 and was completed in 1881. In 1882, stables and various outbuildings were added, to designs by Joseph Swarbrick.

In 1894, the board was succeeded by an urban district council, which made the building its town hall. The building ceased to be the local seat of government in 1904, when the district was annexed by the City of Manchester.

The building was used as a rest centre with capacity for 300 people during the Manchester Blitz in the Second World War. After the war the building remained a venue for public meetings and for dances and concerts.

Manchester City Council continued to use it to deliver services until 1990, when it was declared surplus to requirements, sold for commercial use and converted into offices. After being extensively refurbished for an events management business, APS, in 2007, it went on to become the home of a firm of solicitors, Pabla and Pabla, in 2014.

== Architecture ==
The building is constructed of buff brick, with red brick and terracotta dressings, and a slate roof. It has a rectangular plan, with two storeys and five bays, forming a symmetrical composition. Ornamentation includes fluted pilasters, and the first floor has large windows with elliptical heads. The central bay features a round headed doorway, with voussoirs and a keystone, flanked by brackets supporting a pediment. A carved crest of the Mosley family, who were the lords of the manor, can be seen in the pediment above the doorway. The central bay also features a gable with a terracotta roundel, under a band with the wording "LOCAL BOARD OFFICES". Above this is a pyramidal turret with a clock, topped by a weather vane; (the original clock was by Arnold & Lewis of St Ann’s Square, Manchester). Inside, there is a large staircase with an open well, and a former assembly hall on the first floor.

== See also ==
- Listed buildings in Manchester-M20
