= Withington =

Suburb of Manchester, England

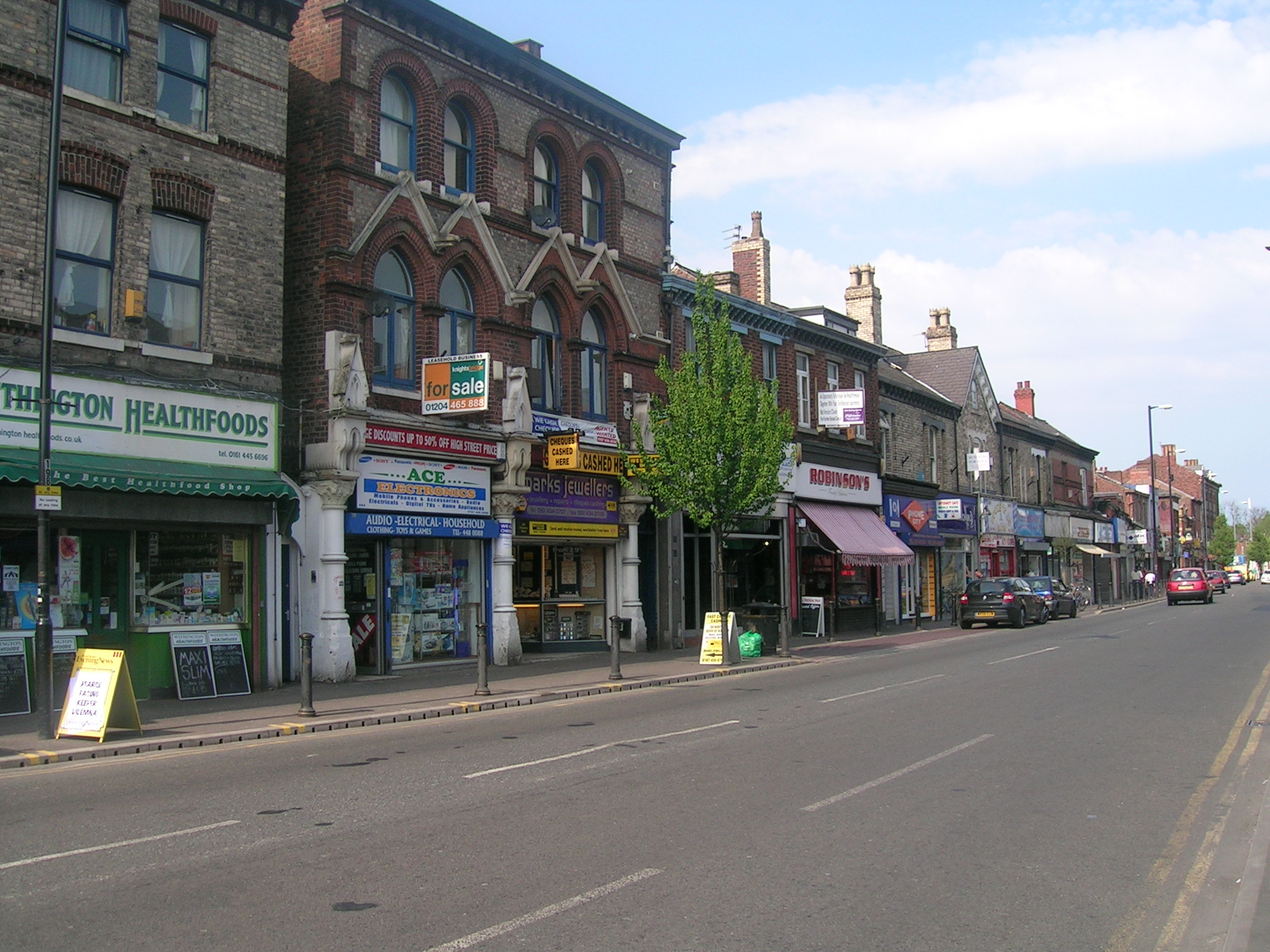
- Withington village centre viewed from Wilmslow Road

- Location within Greater Manchester
- Area: 2.7 sq mi (7.0 km^{2})
- Population: 13,422 (2011 Census)
  - Density: 5,218/sq mi (2,015/km^{2})
- OS grid reference: SJ848929
  - London: 160 miles (257 km) SE
- Metropolitan borough: City of Manchester
- Metropolitan county: Greater Manchester
- Region: North West
- Country: England
- Sovereign state: United Kingdom
- Post town: MANCHESTER
- Postcode district: M20
- Dialling code: 0161
- Police: Greater Manchester
- Fire: Greater Manchester
- Ambulance: North West
- UK Parliament: Manchester Withington

Withington is a suburb of Manchester, England. Historically part of Lancashire, it lies 4 miles (6.4 km) from Manchester city centre, 0.4 miles (0.6 km) south of Fallowfield, 0.5 miles (0.8 km) north-east of Didsbury and 1 mile (1.6 km) east of Chorlton-cum-Hardy. Withington had a population at the 2011 census of 13,422.

In the early 13th century, Withington was a feudal estate that included the townships of Withington, Chorlton-cum-Hardy, Moss Side, Rusholme, Burnage, Denton and Haughton, held by the Hathersage, Longford and Tatton families, within the Manor of Manchester and Hundred of Salford in Lancashire.

Withington was largely rural until the mid-19th century when it experienced rapid socioeconomic development and urbanisation due to the Industrial Revolution, and Manchester's growing level of industrialisation. Withington became part of Manchester in 1904.

Today, the residents of Withington comprise a mixture of families, university students and affluent "young professionals"—often themselves former students. This is in a large part due to its education links—particularly the proximity to the University of Manchester and Manchester Metropolitan University. As a consequence, Withington is predominantly an area of mixed affluence. It is also a centre for clinical excellence with one of the largest cancer treatment centres in Europe—Christie Hospital—and Withington Community Hospital.

== History ==
=== Middle Ages ===
In Anglo-Saxon times, the area was sparsely settled by Mercians and Danes and Didsbury may have been established in King Edward the Elder's reign as a fortification against the Danes. Following the Norman Conquest, the lands of south Lancashire were granted to Roger of Poitou and by the early 13th century the Manor of Withington appears to be a sub-manor of the Manor of Manchester. The first recorded description of Withington referred to the area as a willow-copse farmstead, and giving rise to the Anglo-Saxon name Wīðign-tūn, with withy meaning "willow branch used for bundling". In the early 13th century, the Manor of Withington covered a wide area including Withington, Didsbury, Chorlton-cum-Hardy, Moss Side, Rusholme, Burnage, Denton and Haughton. The first Lord of the Manor of Withington is thought to have been William, son of Wulfrith de Withington.

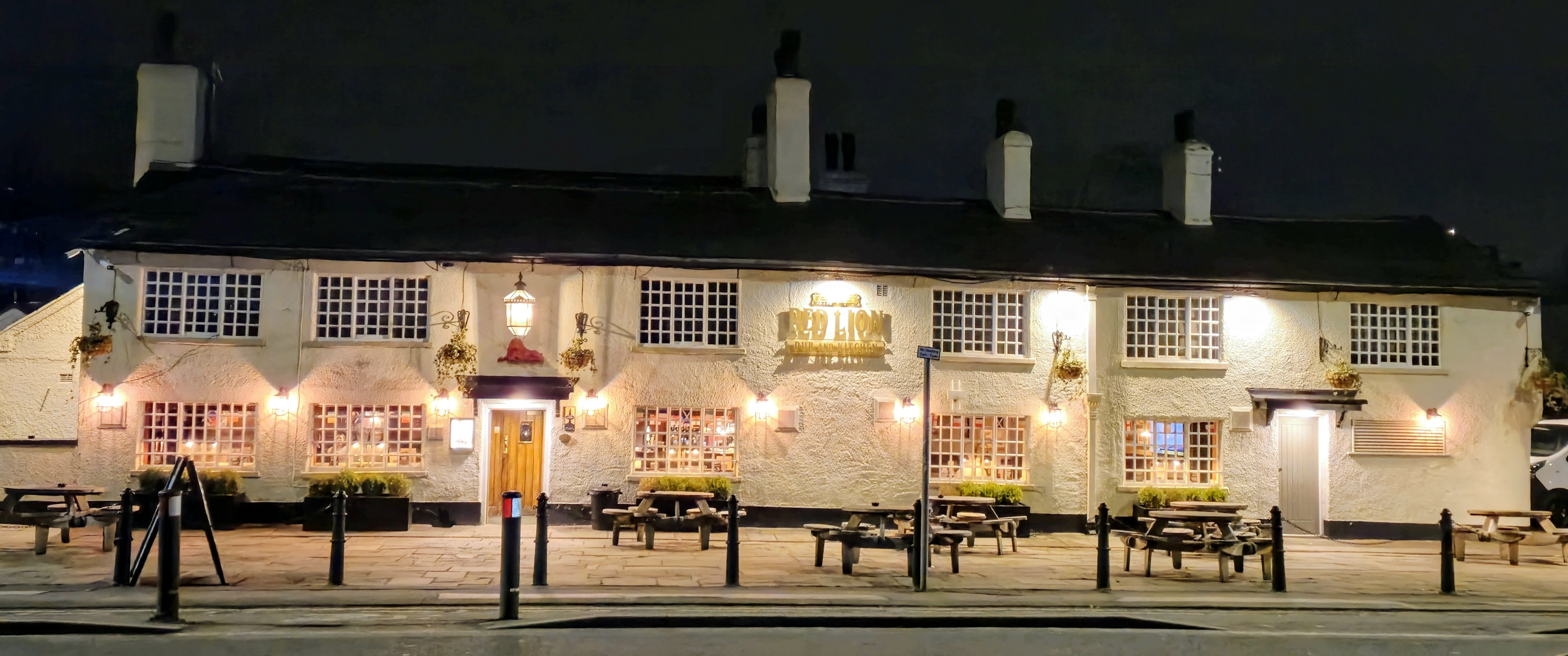
The 17th century Red Lion pub, meeting place of the Court Leet

Withington was one of the townships of the ancient parish of Manchester in the Salford Hundred of Lancashire, and a sub-manor of the Manor of Manchester. In the 13th century, Robert Grelle (sometimes Grelley), Lord of the Manchester Manor, granted free warren in Withington to Matthew de Hathersage (or Haversage), son of William, in exchange for one knight's fee. Little is known of the Hathersage family, except that they descended to the Longford family, and are connected with the manors of Hathersage and Longford, both in Derbyshire. The lordship of Withington remained in the Hathersage/Longford family for over 300 years.

=== Tudor, Stuart and Georgian periods ===
At the end of the 16th century, Nicholas Longford sold Withington to the Mosleys (originally 'Moseley'), an influential Anglo-Irish family of wool merchants who subsequently became wealthy landowners in Staffordshire: Nicholas Mosley later became Lord of the Manor of Manchester. Hough End Hall was built by Sir Nicholas Mosley in 1596 as the new Withington manor house—the original medieval manor house was situated south-east of the modern junction of Mauldeth Road West and Princess Road, which was surrounded by a moat. In 1750, it was demolished to make way for a farm building, but some of the moat was left. An Ordnance Survey map of 1845 shows it as "Withington Old Hall", and it later came to be known as "Chorlton's Farm" or "Old Hall Farm". Today, the site is occupied by Eddisbury Avenue and no trace remains of the old house. There are still today some remnants of this moat underneath Old Moat Primary School, on Old Moat Lane. In the early 18th century, the Withington Manor was once again sold, this time to the Egertons of Tatton.

Withington as a village developed around Wilmslow Road, a main road, connecting Manchester to Wilmslow which was the only direct route between Manchester and Wilmslow at the time. Farming still dominated the area, although there is evidence in maps of a substantial cotton house on Cotton Lane, which later appears to become Withington Hall. Some historians dispute the cotton house as there is little record of it, and claim "Cotton Lane" comes from land in the area which was jointly held by the townships of Withington, Didsbury and Burnage (a relic of the medieval open field system). This area was the old village centre however, although the only relic of its former importance is the small flower display on the corner of Wilmslow Road and Cotton Lane.

=== Victorian and later periods ===
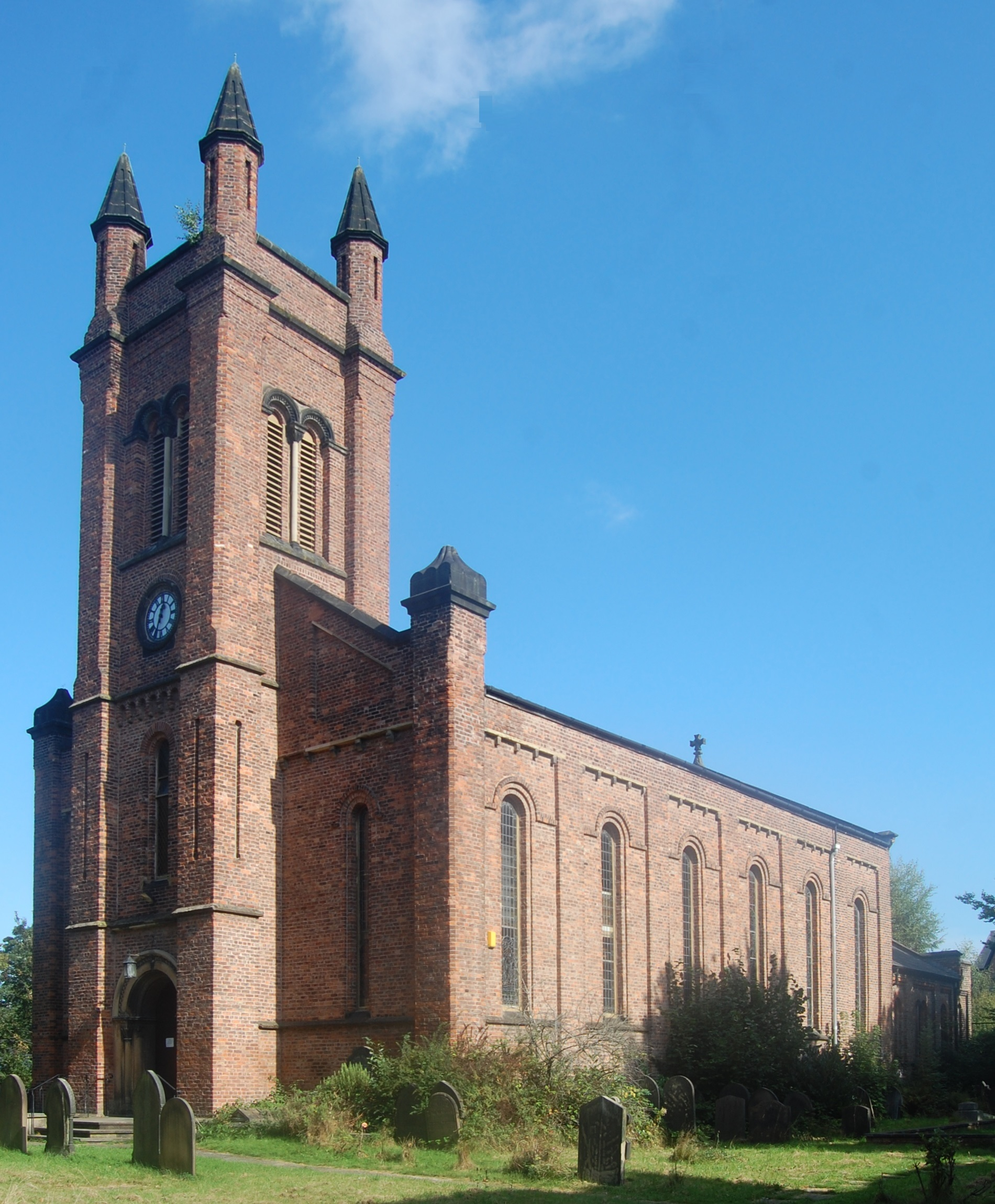
St Paul's Church, Withington

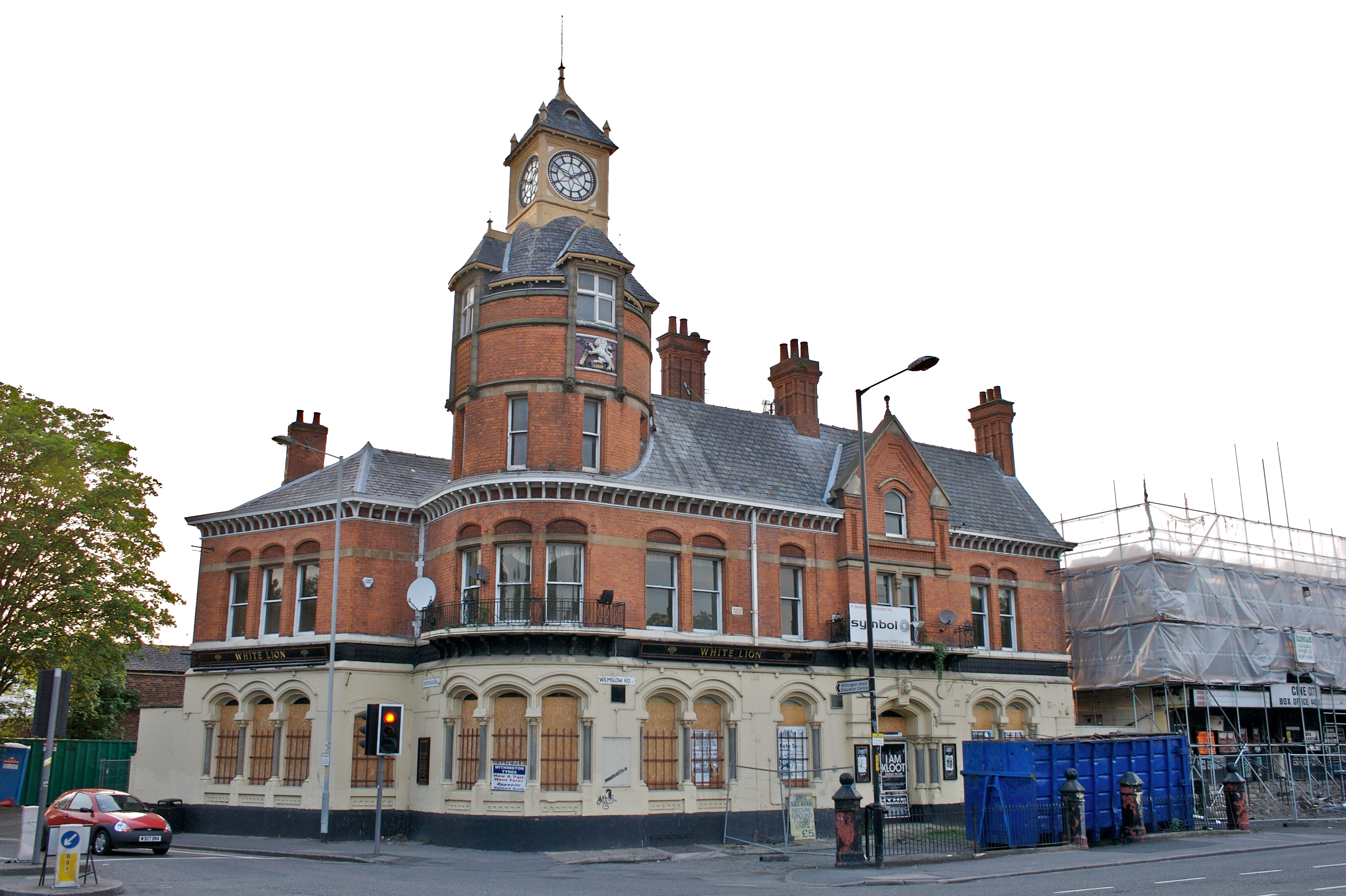
The White Lion: Withington's growth in the Victorian era is evident in much of its architecture

The trade in Withington, and consequent traffic on Wilmslow Road, increased steadily as the city of Manchester flourished in the early 19th century. Turnpike roads subsequently became increasingly unpopular, and were abolished completely in 1881. Cheaper transport in and out of Manchester became an important factor in the growth of the area. The Withington and West Didsbury railway station on the Manchester South District Line, run by the Midland Railway, provided train services to Manchester Central railway station. The railway station closed to passengers in 1961.

Withington's Parish Church of St Paul was built in 1841; the architects of St Paul's Church were Hayley & Brown and it was extended in 1864. Many other chapels and churches proliferated, including Methodist, Presbyterian and Roman Catholic.

As the population increased, the need for schools grew. A day school was held in a schoolroom underneath the Wesleyan chapel on Old Hall Lane, until the Church of England established a new church school with public donations next to its new parish church in 1844, St Paul's Primary School, on land donated by benefactor Wilbraham Egerton, 1st Earl Egerton.

Withington had a Huguenot population with family and commercial ties to Germany. Among them was the Souchay family, who lived at Withington House on Wilmslow Road (the present site of the telephone exchange at Old Broadway). Charles (or Carl) Souchay and his wife Adelaide (or Adelheid) were benefactors of St Paul's church school, and the first wedding to take place at St Paul's was the marriage of the eldest Souchay daughter in 1850. The Souchays were related to Cécile Mendelssohn Bartholdy, wife of the German composer Felix Mendelssohn. In the 1840s, Mendelssohn made several visits to Britain, and stayed on occasion with friends in the Withington/Didsbury area. Mendelssohn wrote a number of letters to friends from Eltville House, the residence of another member of the Souchay family, John D. Souchay, which was situated on the south-east corner of Fog Lane and Wilmslow Road (later renamed Didsbury Priory). An account exists of an occasion in April 1847 when Mendelssohn visited St Paul's Church to play the newly installed pipe organ. The composer was suffering from ill health, and this proved to be his last British tour; less than six months later, on 4 November, aged 38, Mendelssohn died in Leipzig. The Souchays are buried in St Paul's churchyard.

In 1861, a public library and village hall were opened. The library was rebuilt in 1927 with a neo-classical facade.

=== Aviation ===
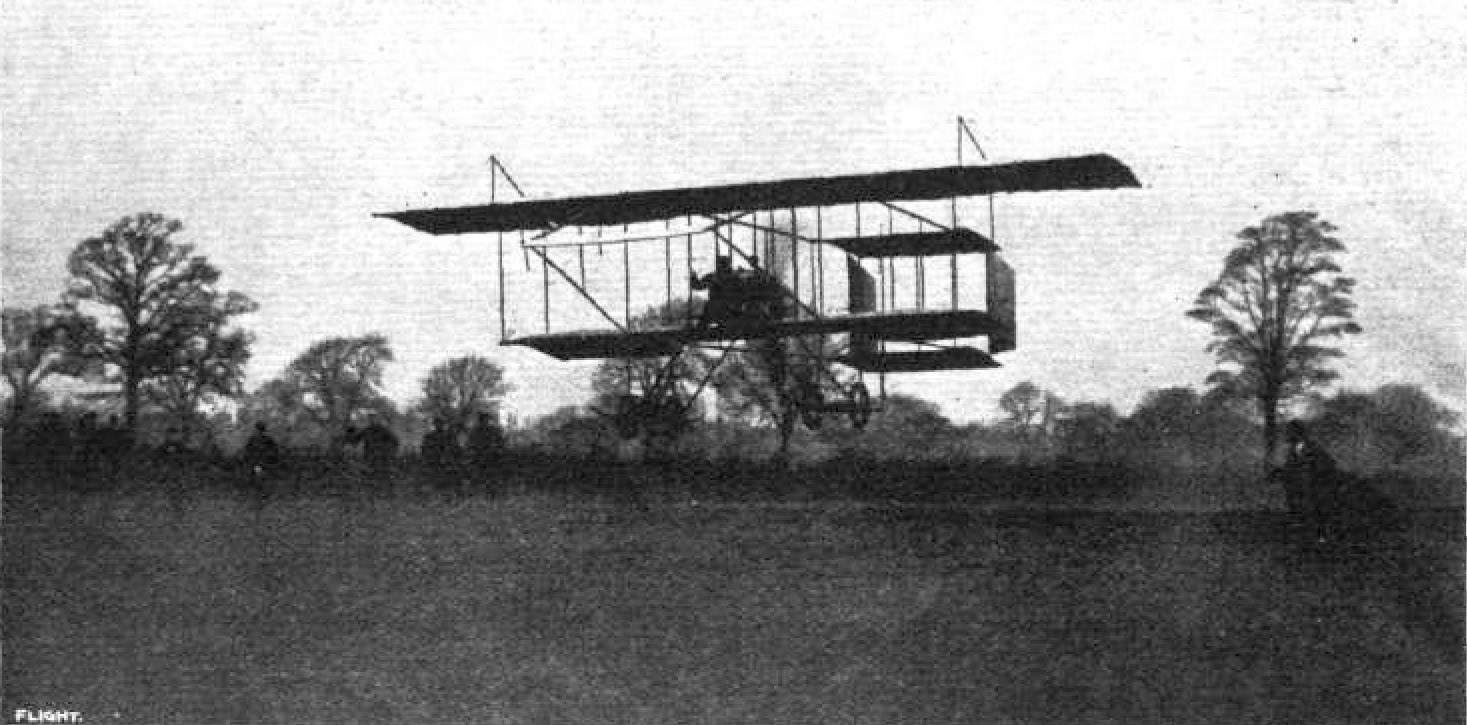
Louis Paulhan landing his aircraft in Barcicroft Fields in 1910

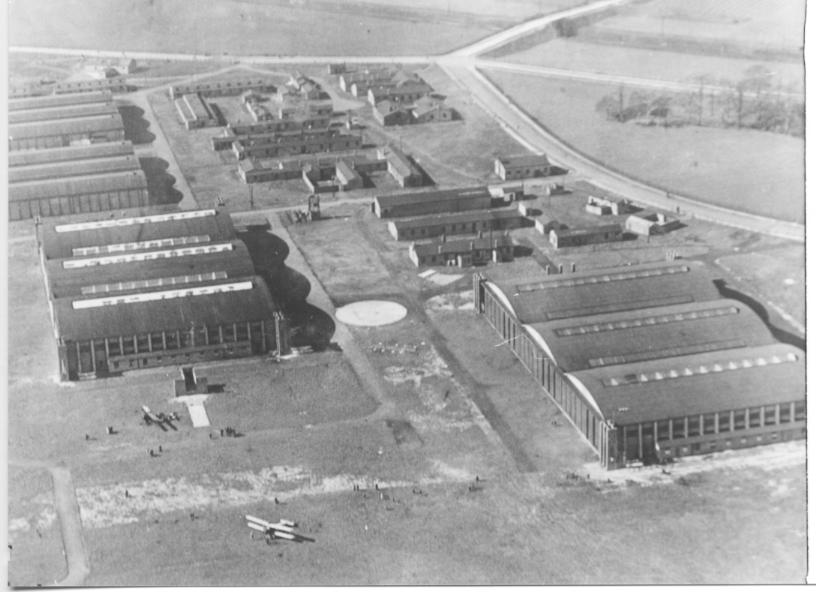
Alexandra Park Aerodrome (1923), now Hough End playing fields

On 28 April 1910, French pilot Louis Paulhan landed his Farman biplane in Barcicroft Fields, Pytha Fold Farm on the borders of Withington, Burnage and Didsbury, at the end of the first powered flight from London to Manchester, with a six-hour overnight stop near Lichfield, Staffordshire. Paulhan beat the British contender, Claude Grahame-White, winning a £10,000 prize offered by the Daily Mail. Two special trains were chartered to Burnage railway station to take spectators to the landing. Paulhan's progress was followed throughout by a special train carrying his wife, Henri Farman and his mechanics. A house in Paulhan Road is marked by a blue plaque to commemorate his achievement.

A large aerodrome was built in 1917–18 on the westerly edge of Withington, to the southwest of the junction of Mauldeth Road and Princess Road, on what is now the site of Houghend Playing Fields. The official name was Alexandra Park Aerodrome, but it was also variously referred to as "Withington" and "Didsbury". Closure came in autumn 1924 when Lord Egerton of Tatton would not agree to the site's continued use for flying. The large hangars were then demolished and Princess Road extended southwards through the eastern edge of the site.

== Governance ==
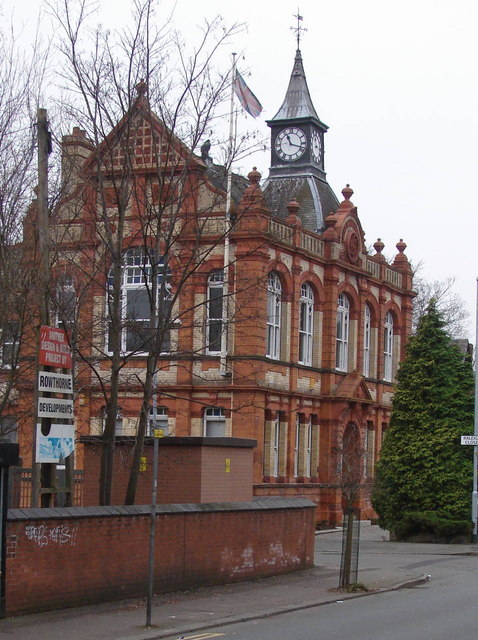
The Grade II listed former Withington Town Hall in the Albert Park conservation area

Withington was anciently a township and chapelry within the parish of Manchester and hundreds of Salford. In 1866, Withington became a separate civil parish. Following the Public Health Act 1875, Withington Town Hall was built in 1881 on Lapwing Lane, originally to house Withington Local Board of Health, then later occupied by the Withington Urban District Council, formed under the Local Government Act 1894. In 1904, the urban district was abolished and Withington became part of the County Borough of Manchester. The Old Town Hall building has been converted into private offices, currently occupied by Pabla & Pabla Solicitors, with new-build apartments to the south (back) and east (side). On 1 October 1933, the parish was abolished and merged with South Manchester. In 1901, the parish had a population of 16,050.

Manchester Withington is a Parliamentary Constituency which encompasses Withington village, Chorlton-cum-Hardy, Burnage and Didsbury (East and West). Manchester Withington became the first constituency in the City of Manchester since 1929 to elect a Liberal (Democrat) MP upon John Leech's gain in the 2005 General Election, when the constituency also experienced the largest swing of that election, taking the previously 11,524 majority Labour safe seat by 667 votes– a swing of 17%. This was possibly attributable to the constituency's large student population. The previous incumbent of the seat, Keith Bradley, had held the seat for Labour for 18 years; Lucy Powell was chosen as the successor candidate to Keith Bradley in March 2007, to try to regain the seat at the next general election. However, Leech retained the seat for the Liberal Democrats at the 2010 General Election, with 44.6% of the vote (an increase of 2.4% over 2005); Powell came second with 40.5% of the vote (a decrease of 0.4%). Since 2015, the current MP is Jeff Smith of the Labour Party.

Historically, Withington was a much larger area than today. Since the district was absorbed into the City of Manchester in 1904, the three cities wards of Didsbury, Fallowfield, and Withington took on their own identities and are now seen as distinct areas. The Conservative Party could once regard this area as a heartland for them, with its largely middle-class population and relatively suburban image. The 'flight of the middle classes' to rural Cheshire, however, led to many of Withington's larger homes being sold off for student flats. This resulted in a changing socio-economic structure that would ultimately favour Labour and more recently, for a time, the Liberal-Democrats.

In the 2011, 2012 and 2014 local government elections, however, the Liberal-Democrats lost every Council seat in Withington Constituency and in the City of Manchester as a whole that they contested, leaving Labour with 95 out of 96 Council seats.

Withington and Old Moat wards are currently represented on Manchester City Council by three councillors each: Becky Chambers (Labour Party), Chris Wills (Labour and Co-operative Party), and Beth Hartness (Green) in Withington; Gavin White (Labour), Sam Easterby-Smith (Green) Garry BriLabour) in Old Moat. Council elections took place on the 2 May 2019 with each ward returning one councillor, Becky Chambers and Garry Bridges respectively in Withington and Old Moat wards.

== Demography ==
Withington compared
UK Census 2001	Withington	Manchester	England
Total population	14,134	392,819	49,138,831
Foreign born	11%	10%	6%
Over 75 years old	5%	6%	8%
Unemployed	44%*	9%	5%
Disproportionate figures explained by full-time student population

According to the 2001 census

- White British– 74.13%
- White Irish– 5.05%
- White other– 3.60%
- Mixed race– 3.25%
- Black– 2.34%
- Asian– 9.76%
- Chinese or other– 1.86%

According to the 2021 census

- Asian, Asian British or Asian Welsh– 15.7%
- Black, Black British, Black Welsh, Caribbean or African– 3.5%
- Mixed or Multiple ethnic groups– 6.1%
- White– 70.1%
- Other ethnic group– 4.6%

== Economy ==
Manchester

== Geography ==
At 53.433°N 2.229°W, Withington is located immediately below the midpoint of the Greater Manchester Urban Area, 4 miles (6.4 km) south of Manchester city centre.

== Landmarks ==
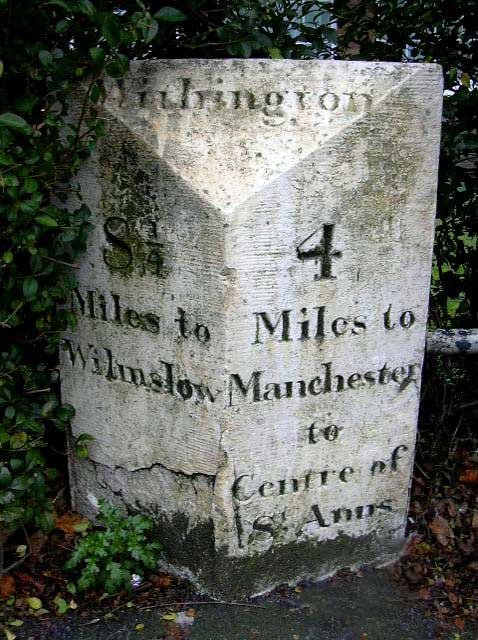
Withington milestone

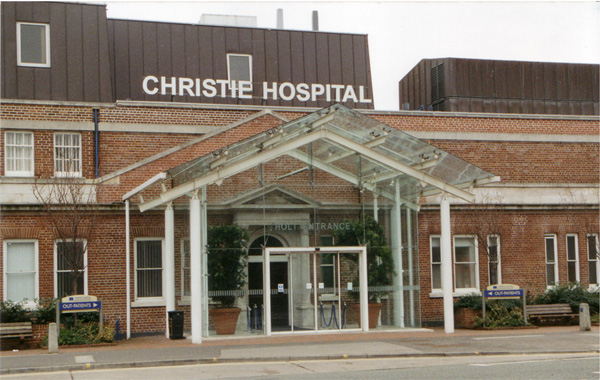
The Christie Hospital is one of largest cancer research and treatment centres in Europe.

Withington today retains some grade II listed buildings, including

- Hough End Hall (1596), Nell Lane, Chorlton-cum-Hardy– Withington Manor House.
- Manchester and County Bank (1890), Wilmslow Road– now an Almost Famous restaurant location.
- St Paul's Parish Church, Wilmslow Road (1841).
- Red Lion Inn (17th century).
- Victoria public house.
- White Lion public house, Wilmslow Road (1841), now a Sainsbury's Local.
- Marcus Rashford mural painted by Akse P19

Other places of historical interest in Withington include:

- Christie Hospital– founded in 1892, the hospital moved to Withington in 1932. It is one of the largest cancer research and treatment centres in Europe. Christies pioneered the therapeutic use of X-Rays in 1901, and in 1944 the world's first clinical drug trial was carried out here.
- Scala Cinema (1912–2008), Wilmslow Road– this was the oldest cinema in Manchester. Currently (April 2018) the site is being developed into Scala, an apartment and retail block.
- Milestone, Wilmslow Road– outside the fire station, inscribed "8¼ miles to Wilmslow / 4 miles to Manchester to centre of St. Ann's"
- Fog Lane Park, a public park om the border with Didsbury and home of a pioneering women's football team, the Manchester Corinthians L.F.C.
- The Old Forge, Wilmslow Road (1881)– now private flats.
- St Cuthbert's Roman Catholic Church, Palatine Road (1881).
- The Water Trough (1876), now on Copson Street– a stone drinking trough for horses, inscribed with an Old Testament passage: "that ye may drink, both ye and your cattle, and your beasts." (II Kings III:17).
- Withington Library (1927), Wilmslow Road, designed by Henry Price.
- Withington Methodist Church, Wilmslow Road (1865).

== Transport ==
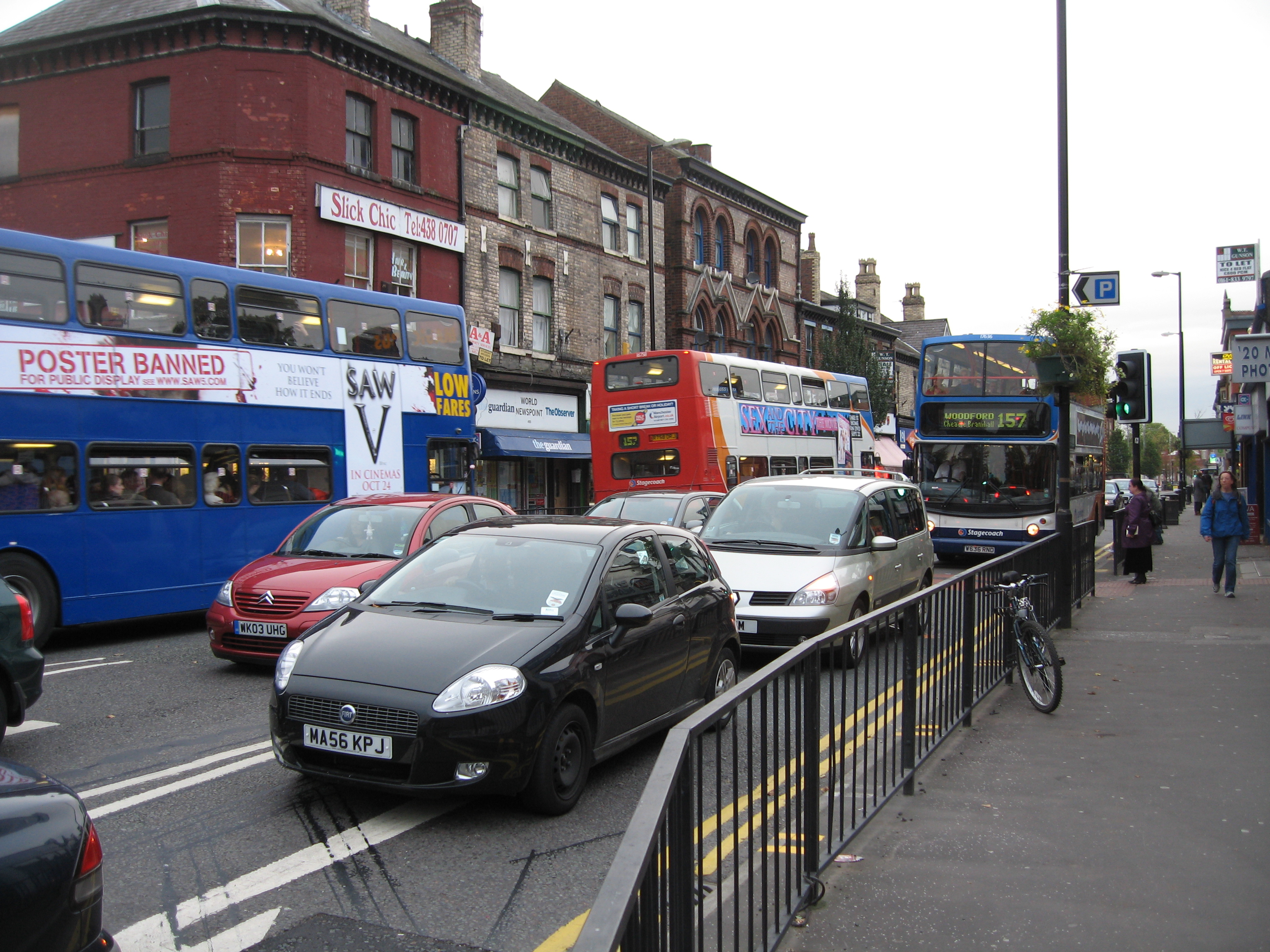
Wilmslow Road bus corridor

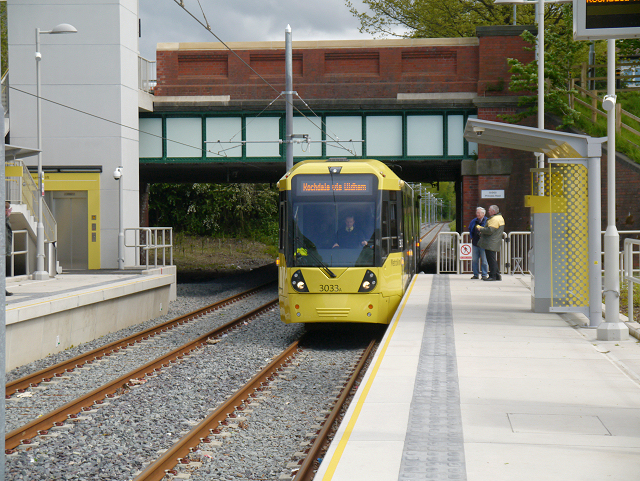
Withington tram stop opened in 2013.

=== Buses ===
Withington has bus links into the Manchester city centre, partly because of its position on the Wilmslow Road bus corridor which is served by very frequent buses and has been said by some analysts to be the busiest in Europe. The majority of services are operated by Stagecoach Manchester and First Greater Manchester. Other bus routes run along Burton Road and Old Moat Lane to the city centre; there are also bus routes crossing Withington East-West.

=== Railway ===
Until the 1960s, Withington had a railway station on Palatine Road, Withington and West Didsbury, on the Midland Railway's Manchester South District Railway. This station was closed in 1961 by British Rail; today the nearest railway station to Withington is Mauldeth Road, located to the east in Ladybarn.

=== Metrolink Trams ===
In 2013, the old Midland Railway line was reopened as a light rail line as part of the Manchester Metrolink network. Today, Metrolink trams provide a direct tram link to Manchester city centre on the South Manchester Line, serving West Didsbury, Burton Road and Withington tram stops. The name of Withington tram stop has been called into question as it is located on Princess Road, approximately 1 mile (1.6 km) from the centre of Withington.

The Metrolink line through Withington was first proposed in the early 1980s but funding was not secured until the 21st century. The project was then put on hold due to escalating costs; new funding was sought through the Manchester Congestion Charge, but this was rejected in a public referendum in 2008. The project was revived in May 2009 with a new funding package from local and national government. Clearance work began on the line in 2011, and it was completed in 2013.

== Education ==
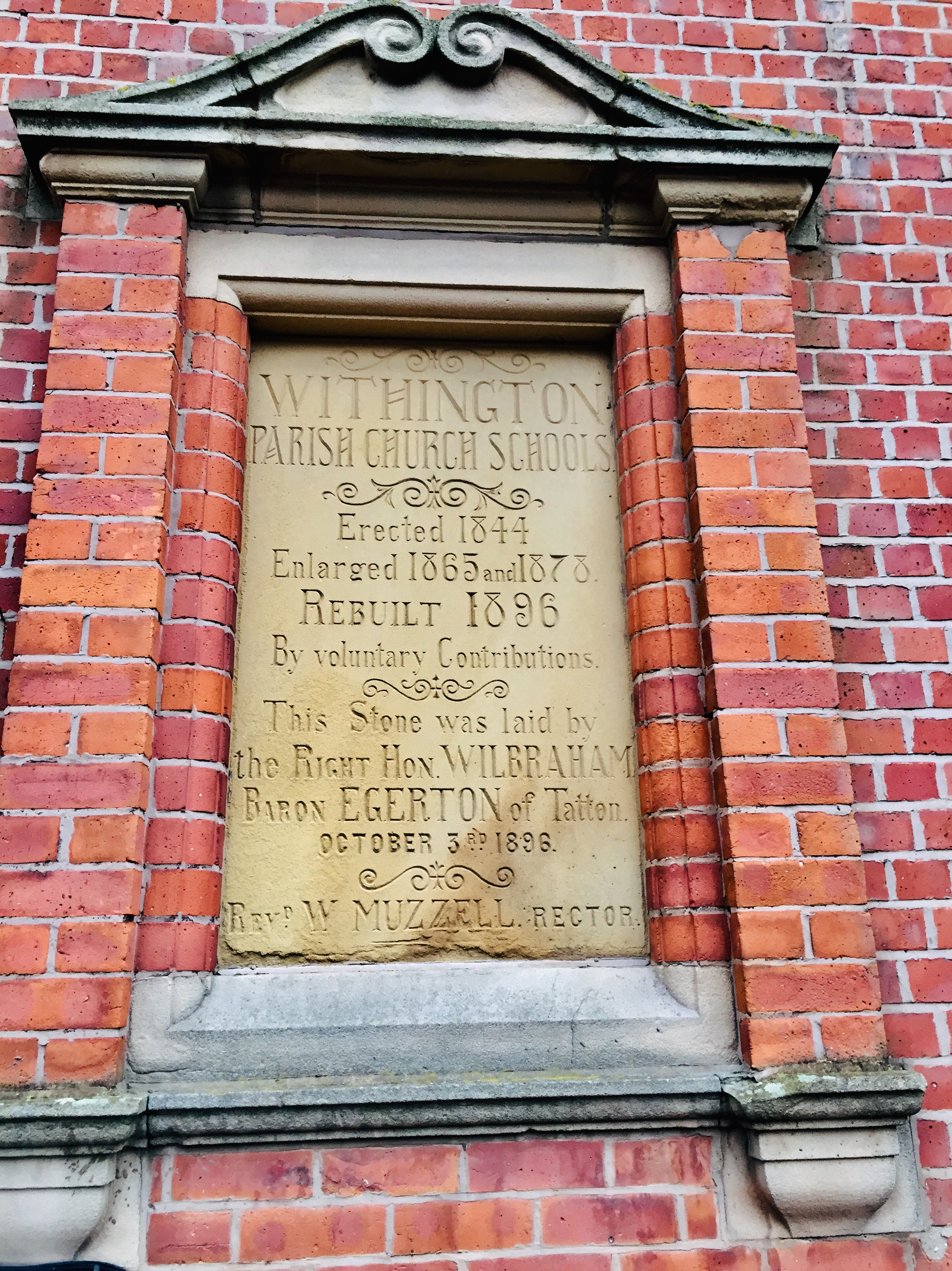
Wall memorial outside the old St Paul's Primary School building commemorating Lord Egerton

Withington Girls' School was established in 1890 and provides private education for girls aged 7 to 18. Notable alumni include Judith Chalmers.

In the 1930s, the Manchester Grammar School moved to new premises in Fallowfield, from its original position near the site of the present Manchester Cathedral. Although seen to be in Fallowfield, its location is also within the boundaries of the Withington locality. The school has been attended by actors such as Ben Kingsley and Robert Powell, cricketer Mike Atherton, and writer and broadcaster Martin Sixsmith.

Withington is served by the following local primary schools:

- Ladybarn Primary School
- St Cuthbert's Roman Catholic Primary School
- St Paul's Church of England Primary School
- Mauldeth Road County Primary School
- St Kentigern's Roman Catholic Primary School, Fallowfield
- Old Moat School, Withington

There are nearest secondary schools, including The Barlow RC High School, Didsbury High School and Parrs Wood High School.

== Police service ==
Withington is covered by the South Manchester Division of Greater Manchester Police.

== Notable people ==
Noted Withington residents

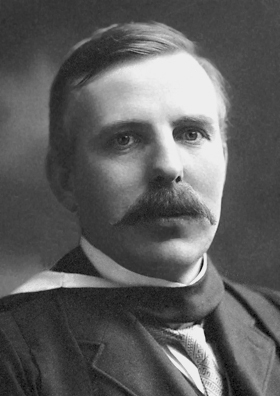
Scientist Ernest Rutherford

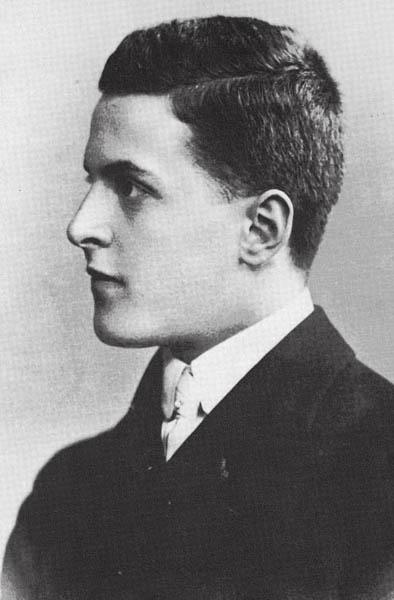
Philosopher Ludwig Wittgenstein

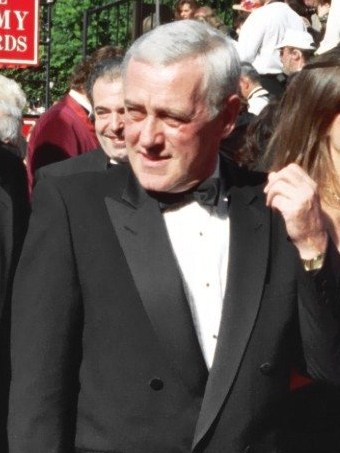
Actor John Mahoney

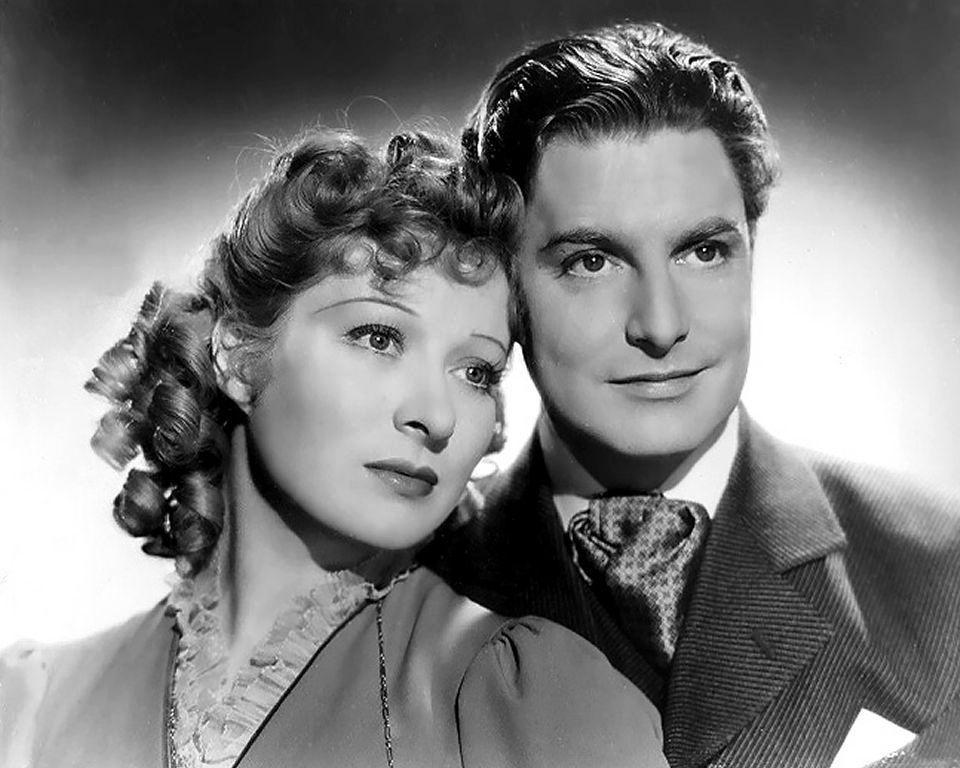
Actor Robert Donat (pictured with Greer Garson)

- Oliver Cookson, the entrepreneur who is best known for founding Myprotein, was born in Withington hospital in 1979.
- Academy Award-winning actor Robert Donat was born in Withington in 1905, making his most acclaimed starring role in the 1939 film Goodbye, Mr. Chips.
- Alan Erasmus, co-founder of Factory Records and the Haçienda with Tony Wilson, has lived on Palatine Road for over 30 years.
- The film critic C.A. Lejeune was born here in 1897.
- Martin Lewis, the financial broadcaster who is known for his MoneySavingExpert.com website, was born in Withington.
- Richard Madeley and his wife, Judy Finnigan, lived on Old Broadway during the 1990s.
- Actor John Mahoney, who became known for his role in Frasier, lived here until 1959.
- Dame Kathleen Ollerenshaw, who was a Conservative councillor for Rusholme for 26 years and a post-graduate of the University of Oxford, was born here in 1912.
- Ernest Rutherford, Nobel Laureate, who pioneered the orbital theory of the atom, and was Head of Physics at Manchester University, lived in the village between 1898 and 1910. He is commemorated with a blue plaque on the house in which he lived on Wilmslow Road, now called "Rutherford Lodge".
- In 1911, the Austrian philosopher Ludwig Wittgenstein was known to have lodgings at 104 (now 154) Palatine Road while he was a student at the Victoria University of Manchester.
- William John Young, biochemist, was born in Withingon in 1878.

=== Sport ===
- Lindsay Bury, a footballer who helped the Old Etonians win the FA Cup in 1879 and made two appearances for England in the 1870s, was born in Withington on 9 July 1857.
- Lee Marland, cricketer, was born in Withington.
- Kate Richardson-Walsh, the gold medal-winning Team GB hockey player, was born in Withington.
- Frank Whitcombe Jr, Rugby Union player for Bradford and Yorkshire, was born in Withington.

== See also ==
- Grade II* listed buildings in Greater Manchester
- Listed buildings in Manchester-M20
