= Crown green bowls =

Code of bowls played outdoors on a grass or artificial turf surface

- Highest governing body: British Crown Green Bowling Association (BCGBA)
- Nicknames: Crown green, Crown
- First played: 1888 (first governing body)
- Registered players: 200,000
- Clubs: 3,000

Characteristics
- Contact: No
- Team members: Single competitors or pairs.
- Mixed-sex: Yes
- Type: Outdoor, bowls
- Equipment: Players use two woods each, a jack, and a portable mat.
- Venue: Bowling green

Presence
- Country or region: Midlands, North of England, Isle of Man and North Wales.
- Olympic: No
- Paralympic: No
- World Games: No

Crown green bowls (or crown green) is a code of bowls played outdoors on a grass or artificial turf surface known as a bowling green. The sport's name is derived from the intentionally convex or uneven nature of the bowling green which is traditionally formed with a raised centre known as the crown.

Crown green bowls is played in the Midlands, Northern England, and North Wales.

== Game ==
The aim of crown green bowls is to roll a set of two bowls from the hand towards a smaller target bowl known as the jack. Rolling the bowl or jack is known as the delivery. When delivering a bowl or jack, the player must place one foot on a mat to ensure that all bowls and jack are sent from the same spot.

A full game comprises a number of ends. An end is where the jack is rolled first. The player sending the jack can choose to deliver it wherever they like on the bowling green. This ability to bowl an end in any direction is a unique feature of crown green bowls. Players then take it in turns to roll each of their bowls towards the jack. An end finishes when all bowls have been delivered. At the amateur level it is usual for several ends to be played simultaneously on one green. If two moving woods meet, both are taken back and the shots replayed. If a moving wood strikes a stationary wood or jack from another end, it is again taken back and replayed, but the bowl struck is replaced where contact took place.

The aim of an end is for a player to finish with their own bowls closer to the jack than those of the opponent. For each bowl that is closer than those of the opponent, a player scores one point. Each player usually has two bowls allowing a maximum of two points on each end. A score of one or two is denoted to the two markers (one from each team, in a team match) by raising one or two hands. The winner of the end delivers the jack in the next end.

Competitive games are usually held between two people with the winner being the first person to accumulate 21 points. An unlimited number of ends are played until someone wins. Variations exist where players can have more than two bowls, games are played to 31 points or more, or players form teams of two or more players.

== Bowling green ==
Crown green bowls is played on a specially prepared short-cut smooth grass surface known as a bowling green or simply the green (usually 45x45 yards). The green usually has a raised centre known as the crown which can often be as high as 30 centimetres above the edge of the green. The green has a ditch around the edge, and slopes on all sides from the crown towards the ditch. Greens are usually rectangular or square, but L-shaped and circular greens also exist. The surfaces also often feature ridges, hollows and slopes to make the game more difficult. Due to this vast array of historical differences, no rules stipulating the shape, size or height of the crown are laid down by the British Crown Green Bowls Association.

== Bowls equipment ==
=== Bowls ===
In crown green bowls, players use two bowls each. Bowls are also commonly known as woods. There are no requirement for official markings on the bowls although manufacturers branding and the weight of the bowls is common. Players often have their initials marked on one side, or use stickers to identify their bowls. One side of the bowl has an indent or dimple allowing the player to identify by touch which side of the bowl has the bias.

Crown green bowls come in a variety of bias strengths, weights, densities, sizes, materials and colours. The minimum weight is 2 lb (0.91 kg) but there is no maximum weight.

Bowls are referred to and sold by their weight, and are available from 2 lb 0 oz to 2 lb 14 oz, in 1 oz increments. They were traditionally made from lignum vitae wood but are now manufactured from a composite plastic. Wooden bowls have a variable density throughout their core due to the nature of wood. Plastic bowls have a consistent and regular density throughout and manufacturers can produce bowls in different densities generally known as standard, low density and high density. This means that a smaller bowl with a higher density can be the same weight as a larger bowl with a lower density.

There are two ways of delivering a bowl: with or against the bias. Sending a bowl with the thumb on the biased side is known as thumb peg and sending a bowl with the thumb on the non-biased side is known as finger peg. The different pegs determine in which direction the bowl will go. A player delivering the jack is expected to declare which peg is used, but a player delivering a subsequent wood is not.

=== Jack ===
The jack, also commonly known as the block, is a smaller version of the bowls used by each player in a game of crown green bowls and also contains a bias. There are written specifications determining the size, weight and bias strength of jacks. To be able to be used in an official British Crown Green Bowls Association recognised league match or competition, jacks must be black, white or yellow. Other colours are available for use in practice.

Jacks have different markings on each side. On one side there is a single circle with the manufacturer's name and other official lettering. This side of the jack is the side with the bias. The other side has a single circle surrounded by three solid dots or smaller circles indicating the non-bias side. Official jacks must also be stamped with an approved date stamp every seven years to comply with the rules. Jacks measure 9.5 cm (3 & 3/4 inches) in diameter and weigh about 660 grams (1 lb 7 oz).

=== Mat ===
The mat is also known as the footer. It is usually black and has a textured top surface to help with grip. It a simple rubber circular mat measuring 14 cm (4.5 inches) in diameter, and around 0.5 cm (1/8th of an inch) in thickness. When delivering a jack or bowl, the player must place their non-leading foot on the mat.

== Major events ==
The first event that gained major status was the Talbot Handicap played at the Talbot Hotel in Blackpool which was inaugurated in 1887 and continued until 1975. In 1907 the Waterloo Handicap was inaugurated and the event held at the Waterloo Hotel (also in Blackpool) eventually surpassed the importance of the Talbot Handicap. The Waterloo Hotel had its safety licence to hold big competitions withdrawn and the competition lost some of its stature when it transferred to Fleetwood Bowling Club in 2022.

More modern events include the BCGBA Senior Individual Merit and BCGBA Champion of Champions.

== Past winners ==
=== BCGBA Champion of Champions ===
Extended content

Year	Winner
1974	Jim Hadfield
1975	Jim Collen
1976	Tony Poole
1977	Cliff Bordley
1978	Noel Burrows
1979	Terry Turner
1980	Noel Burrows
1981	Dave Ellis
1982	Nigel Cranston
1983	Stan Frith
1984	Tony Poole
1985	Robert Hitchen
1986	Steve Smurthwaite
1987	Brian Shore
1988	Martin Gilpin
1989	Tommy Johnstone
1990	Ian Rigby
1991	Brian Duncan
1992	Steve Williams

Year	Winner
1993	Jack Robertson
1994	Stuart Jones
1995	Ken Strutt
1996	Ken Strutt
1997	Andy Petford
1998	Paul Strutt
1999	Ian Rigby
2000	Chris Mordue
2001	Kerry Morris
2002	Alan Thompson
2003	Graeme Wilson
2004	Gary Ellis
2005	Paul Wilson
2006	Andrew Spragg
2007	John Bailey
2008	Graeme Wilson
2009	Graeme Wilson
2010	Chris Mordue
2011	Gary Ellis

Year	Winner
2012	John Finch
2013	Terry Glover
2014	Simon Coupe
2015	Callum Wraight
2016	Gary Ellis
2017	Michael Beer
2018	John Bailey
2019	Colin Kelly
2020	not held (COVID)
2021	not held (covid)
2022	Chris Kelly
2023	Greg Smith
2024	Paul Dudley

=== BCGBA Senior Merit ===
Extended content

Year	Winner
1910	E Peers
1911	J Stead
1912	T Dale
1913	J Chesters
1914	A Robinson
1915	J Charnock
1916	S Sackville
1917	J Gough
1918	T Burgess
1919	J Charnock
1920	W Twist
1921	F Dickinson
1922	John Gleave
1923	Joe Gleave
1924	E Blackledge
1925	F Bentley
1926	A Booth
1927	P Ainscough
1928	Joe Gleave
1929	J Gough
1930	G Fielding
1931	J Fort
1932	C Garside
1933	J Eyes
1934	Joe Gleave
1935	J Pickering
1936	G Howells
1937	W Garrard
1938	J Davies
1939	W Garside
1940-45 not held
1946	B Longbottom
1947	H King
1948	R Meyrick
1949	A Bebbington
1950	J Barnsley
1951	J Pilling

Year	Winner
1952	A Shore
1953	W Slater
1954	N Norris
1955	H Burgess
1956	E Fish
1957	N Hardman
1958	C Littlehales
1959	E Ashton
1960	R Hodson
1961	R Meyrick
1962	R Meyrick
1963	F Goulden
1964	R Green
1965	W Baldwin
1966	R Meyrick
1967	A Shore
1968	R Oakes
1969	A Johnson
1970	A Dowley
1971	Tony Poole
1972	Dennis Mercer
1973	W Line
1974	F Whitehead
1975	R Wilby
1976	Noel Burrows
1977	R Edkins
1978	K Widdowson
1979	Jack Hunt
1980	J Hadfield
1981	Ian Ross
1982	Ian Bottomley
1983	Stan Frith
1984	Michael Leach
1985	T Moss
1986	Steve Smurthwaite
1987	A Dodd
1988	Ron Stanford

Year	Winner
1989	Chris Squires
1990	Phil Owen
1991	Paul Chamberlain
1992	Stan Frith
1993	John Taylor
1994	Steve Ellis
1995	Gary Ainley
1996	Stephen Hirst
1997	Glynn Cookson
1998	Stuart Perry
1999	Lee Heaton
2000	Graeme Wilson
2001	Matt Gilmore
2002	Tommy Johnstone
2003	Gary Ellis
2004	Graeme Wilson
2005	Darren Smith
2006	Andrew Spragg
2007	Andrew Spragg
2008	Matt Bower
2009	Callum Wraight
2010	Noel Burrows
2011	Mike Riley
2012	Gary Ellis
2013	Greg Smith
2014	Ashley Daykin
2015	Tom Vickers
2016	Matt Gilmore
2017	Darren Plenderleith
2018	Chris Mordue
2019	Ryan Prosser
2020	not held (covid)
2021	Ross Dunkley
2022	Callum Wraight
2023	Simon Coupe
2024	Greg Smith

=== The Talbot Handicap ===
Extended content

Year	Winner
1887	T Salisbury
1888	D Greenhalgh
1889	J Bowden
1890	D Greenhalgh
1891	H Rutter
1892	William Balmer
1893	John Peace
1894	Thomas Berry
1895	Gerard Hart
1896	R Mather
1897	Thomas Meadows
1898	Thomas Hayes
1899	John Peace
1900	Edward Barton
1901	James Platt
1902	James Ward
1903	W Fairhurst
1904	C Farrington
1905	M Sharples
1906	W Taylor
1907	J Bagot
1908	S Massey
1909	W H Law
1910	R Hart
1911	F Threlfall
1912	Richard Birchall
1913	H Southern
1914	J Bromilow
1915	T Richardson
1916	R Johnson

Year	Winner
1917	G F Hampson
1918	Eli Yates
1919	Edward Whiteside
1920	L Banks
1921	F Threlfall
1922	W Finch
1923	J Farnworth
1924	Tom Rose
1925	Jack Cox
1926	G Beswick
1927	T Monks
1928	G Beswick
1929	W R Hardy
1930	H Walkden
1931	R Pendlebury
1932	James Heyes
1933	T Turner
1934	H Hardman
1935	H Bury
1936	W Grace
1937	G Lomax
1938	W Molyneux
1939	abandoned
1940	W J Wilcock
1941	J Edmondson
1942	George Croker
1943	F Gillett
1944	W Ashton
1945	J Jolly
1946	A Raby

Year	Winner
1947	R Thomas
1948	J H Hill
1949	J Molyneux
1950	J Wolstencroft
1951	W Parr
1952	J Timmins
1953	J Molyneux
1954	W Parr
1955	W Simm
1956	J Rothwell
1957	J E Ball
1958	R Mercer
1959	W H Frost
1960	W Dalton
1961	W Turner
1962	W Dalton
1963	R Kellett
1964	J Kirby
1965	A Milnes
1966	S Priestley
1967	Billy Dawber
1968	F Whitehead
1969	R Peat
1970	Keith Illingworth
1971	G Rigby
1972	W Dalton
1973	C E Jackson
1974	Brian Duncan
1975	Stuart Buckley
Discontinued

=== The Fleetwood Autumn Waterloo (formerly Waterloo Handicap) ===
Extended content

Year	Winner
1907	James Rothwell
1908	George Beatty
1909	Tom Meadows
1910	not held
1911	John Peace
1912	Thomas Lowe
1913	Gerard Hart
1914	John Rothwell
1915	W Fairhurst
1916	J Parkinson
1917	George Barnes
1918	W Simms
1919	Len Moss
1920	E Whiteside
1921	J Bagot
1922	W A Smith
1923	J Martin
1924	Rowland Hill
1925	Jack Cox
1926	T Roscoe
1927	H Waddecar
1928	T Whittle
1929	Charles Halpin
1930	J Chadwick
1931	A Gleave
1932	T E Booth
1933	A Ogden
1934	W Derbyshire
1935	C Roberts
1936	H Yates
1937	A King
1938	J W Whitter
1939	abandoned
1940	H Holden
1941	W J Wilcock
1942	Tommy Bimson
1943	S Ivell
1944	Tedber Tinker
1945	W Grace
1946	C Parkinson

Year	Winner
1947	W Dalton
1948	Albert E Ringrose
1949	J Egan
1950	H Finch
1951	J Waterhouse
1952	L Thompson
1953	Bernard Kelly
1954	Bernard Kelly
1955	J Heyes
1956	J Sumner
1957	Bill Lacy
1958	F Salisbury
1959	Billy Dawber
1960	H Bury
1961	J Featherstone
1962	J Collier
1963	T Mayor
1964	W B Heinkey
1965	J Pepper
1966	R Collier
1967	Eric Ashton
1968	Billy Bennett
1969	G T Underwood
1970	Jack Everitt
1971	J Bradbury
1972	Noel Burrows
1973	Arthur Murray
1974	W Houghton
1975	Jim Collen
1976	Keith Illingworth
1977	L Barrett
1978	Arthur Murray
1979	Brian Duncan
1980	Vernon Lee
1981	Roy Nicholson
1982	Dennis Mercer
1983	Stan Frith
1984	S Ellis
1985	Tommy Johnstone
1986	Brian Duncan

Year	Winner
1987	Brian Duncan
1988	Ingham Gregory
1989	Brian Duncan
1990	John Bancroft
1991	John Eccles
1992	Brian Duncan
1993	Allen Broadhurst
1994	Billy Hilton
1995	Ken Strutt
1996	Lee Heaton
1997	Andy Cairns
1998	Mick Jagger
1999	Ivan Smout
2000	Carl Armitage
2001	Glynn Cookson
2002	Stan Frith
2003	Gary Ellis
2004	Noel Burrows
2005	John Bailey
2006	Andy Moss
2007	Stan Frith
2008	Gary Ellis
2009	Gary Ellis
2010	Simon Coupe
2011	Simon Coupe
2012	Gary Ellis
2013	Andy Buckley
2014	Gary Ellis
2015	Greg Smith
2016	Tim Houghton
2017	Wayne Dicthfield
2018	Jon Palmer
2019	Paul Dale
2020-21 not held (covid)
2022	Paul Dudley
2023	Lee Brown
2024	Gareth Coates
