= 1949 Altrincham Municipal Borough Council election =

1949 English local election

← 1947	12 May 1949	1950 →

8 of 32 seats to Altrincham Municipal Borough Council 16 seats needed for a majority
	First party	Second party	Third party
Party	Conservative	Independent	Labour
Last election	8 seats, 46.2%	4 seats, 28.4%	0 seats, 20.2%
Seats before	14	16	2
Seats won	6	1	1
Seats after	17	13	2
Seat change	▲3	▼3	Steady
Popular vote	6,802	1,095	3,733
Percentage	57.2%	9.2%	31.4%
Swing	▲11.0%	▼19.2%	▲11.2%
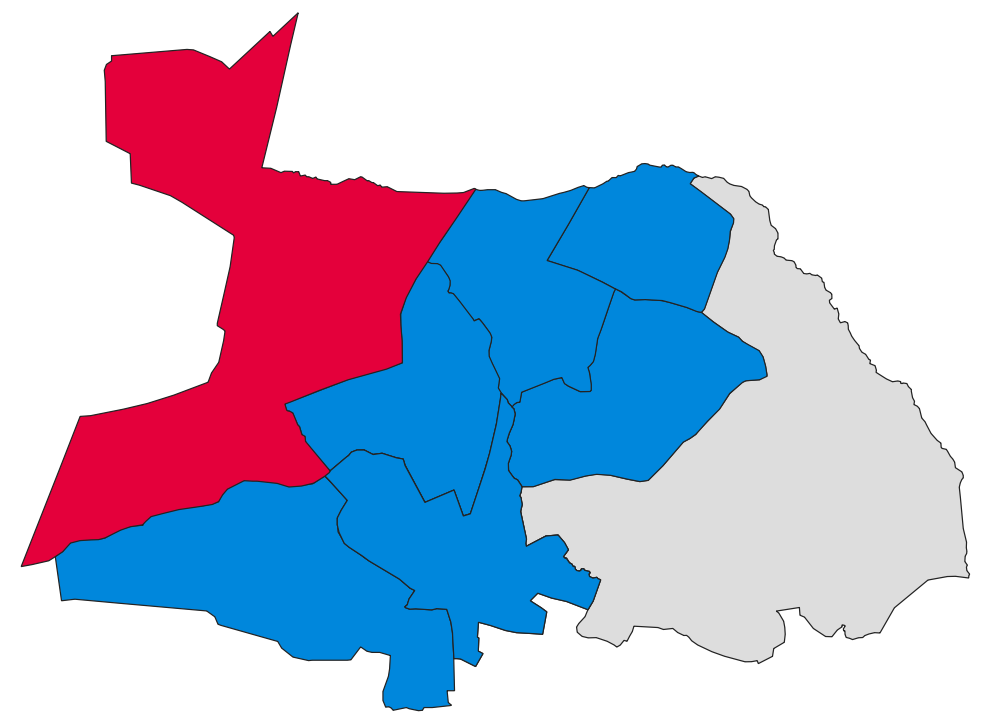
- Map of results of 1949 election
Leader of the Council before election
Independent
Leader of the Council after election
Conservative

Elections to Altrincham Council were held on Thursday, 12 May 1949. One third of the councillors were up for election, with each successful candidate to serve a three-year term of office. The Conservative Party gained overall control of the council.

== Election result ==
Party	Votes		Seats			Full Council	
Conservative Party	6,802 (57.2%)	▲11.0	6 (75.0%)	6 / 8	▲3	17 (53.1%)	17 / 32
Independent	1,095 (9.2%)	▼19.2	1 (12.5%)	1 / 8	▼3	13 (40.6%)	13 / 32
Labour Party	3,733 (31.4%)	▲11.2	1 (12.5%)	1 / 8	Steady	2 (6.3%)	2 / 32

=== Full council ===
↓
2	13	17

=== Aldermen ===
↓
7	1

=== Councillors ===
↓
2	6	16

== Ward results ==
=== Dunham ===
Dunham
Party	Candidate	Votes	%	±%
Labour	T. Baxter*	1,274	56.0	+9.4
Conservative	G. H. Cherry	999	44.0	−9.4
Majority		275	12.0	
Turnout		2,273		
Labour hold		Swing		

=== East Central ===
East Central
Party	Candidate	Votes	%	±%
Conservative	J. Anderson	1,130	64.6	N/A
Labour	J. G. Williams	618	35.4	+9.4
Majority		512	29.3	
Turnout		1,748		
Conservative gain from Independent		Swing		

=== North ===
North
Party	Candidate	Votes	%	±%
Conservative	G. B. Jones	1,170	53.0	N/A
Labour	E. Hoyle	1,037	47.0	+9.0
Majority		133	6.0	
Turnout		2,207		
Conservative gain from Independent		Swing		

=== South West ===
South West
Party	Candidate	Votes	%	±%
Conservative	F. W. Grice	1,160	81.2	N/A
Independent	S. G. Marshall	269	18.8	N/A
Majority		891	62.4	
Turnout		1,429		
Conservative gain from Independent		Swing		

=== Timperley (1) ===
Timperley (1)
Party	Candidate	Votes	%	±%
Conservative	J. L. Baxendale*	1,455	64.4	+6.7
Labour	R. D. Peacock	804	35.6	+4.5
Majority		651	28.8	+2.2
Turnout		2,259		
Conservative hold		Swing		

=== Timperley (2) ===
Timperley (2)
Party	Candidate	Votes	%	±%
Conservative	E. Cashmore*	uncontested		
Conservative hold		Swing		

=== Timperley (3) ===
Timperley (3)
Party	Candidate	Votes	%	±%
Conservative	G. A. Haigh*	uncontested		
Conservative hold		Swing		

=== Timperley (4) ===
Timperley (4)
Party	Candidate	Votes	%	±%
Independent	E. Studley*	1,095	55.2	+4.5
Conservative	A. Melvin Turner	888	45.0	−0.2
Majority		207	10.4	+7.5
Turnout		1,983		
Independent hold		Swing		
