= 1958 Altrincham Municipal Borough Council election =

Local election in Cheshire, England

← 1957	8 May 1958	1959 →

8 of 32 seats to Altrincham Municipal Borough Council 16 seats needed for a majority
	First party	Second party	Third party
Party	Conservative	Labour	Independent
Last election	5 seats, 42.0%	2 seats, 35.9%	1 seats, 8.3%
Seats before	20	6	6
Seats won	5	2	0
Seats after	19	6	6
Seat change	▼1	Steady	Steady
Popular vote	6,923	5,111	0
Percentage	50.5%	37.3%	0.0%
Swing	▲8.5%	▲1.4%	▼8.3%
	Fourth party
Party	Liberal
Last election	0 seats, 13.9%
Seats before	0
Seats won	1
Seats after	1
Seat change	▲1
Popular vote	1,682
Percentage	12.3%
Swing	▼1.6%
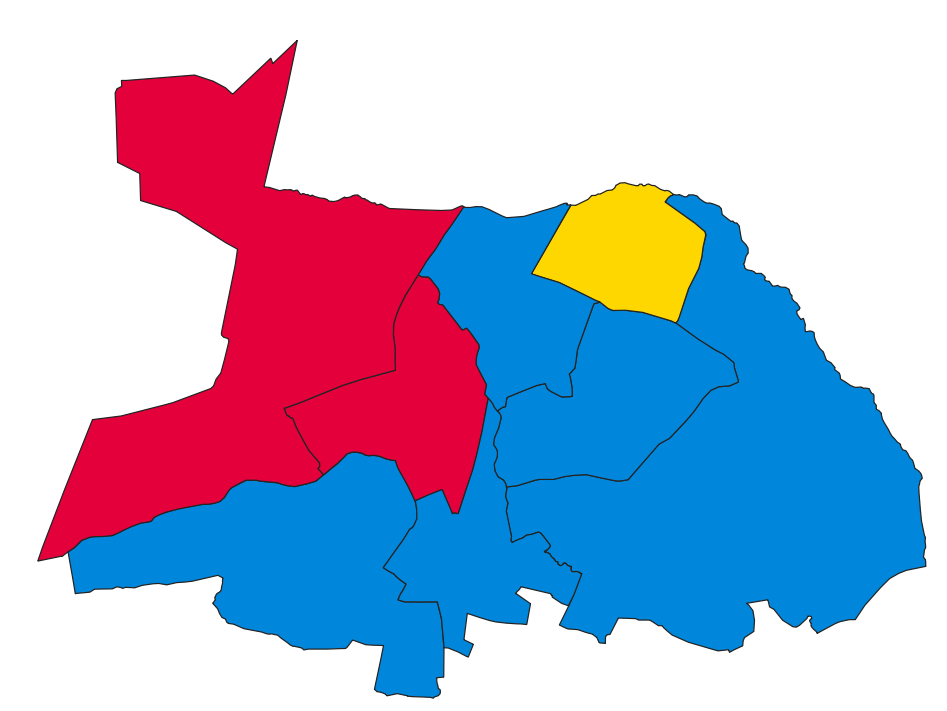
- Map of results of 1958 election
Leader of the Council before election
Conservative
Leader of the Council after election
Conservative

Elections to Altrincham Council were held on Thursday, 8 May 1958. One third of the councillors were up for election, with each successful candidate to serve a three-year term of office. The Conservative Party retained control of the council.

== Election result ==
Party	Votes		Seats			Full Council	
Conservative Party	6,923 (50.5%)	▲8.5	5 (62.5%)	5 / 8	▼1	19 (59.4%)	19 / 32
Labour Party	5,111 (37.3%)	▲1.4	2 (25.0%)	2 / 8	Steady	6 (18.8%)	6 / 32
Independent	0 (0.0%)	▼8.3	0 (0.0%)	0 / 8	Steady	6 (18.8%)	6 / 32
Liberal Party	1,682 (12.3%)	▼1.6	1 (12.5%)	1 / 8	▲1	1 (3.1%)	1 / 32

=== Full council ===
↓
6	1	6	19

=== Aldermen ===
↓
5	3

=== Councillors ===
↓
6	1	1	16

== Ward results ==
=== Dunham ===
Dunham
Party	Candidate	Votes	%	±%
Labour	G. Hoyle*	uncontested		
Labour hold		Swing		

=== East Central ===
East Central
Party	Candidate	Votes	%	±%
Conservative	A. R. Littler*	803	51.2	N/A
Labour	W. J. Webb	766	48.8	+1.3
Majority		37	2.4	
Turnout		1,569		
Conservative hold		Swing		

=== North ===
North
Party	Candidate	Votes	%	±%
Labour	G. Harmer*	1,039	57.1	+0.3
Conservative	P. Oliver	780	42.9	−0.3
Majority		259	14.2	+0.6
Turnout		1,819		
Labour hold		Swing		

=== South West ===
South-West
Party	Candidate	Votes	%	±%
Conservative	C. J. Jones*	1,049	62.5	N/A
Labour	F. C. Hankes	630	37.5	N/A
Majority		419	25.0	
Turnout		1,679		
Conservative hold		Swing		

=== Timperley (1) ===
Timperley (1)
Party	Candidate	Votes	%	±%
Conservative	J. L. Baxendale*	1,013	62.0	N/A
Labour	H. Ainscow	622	38.0	N/A
Majority		391	24.0	
Turnout		1,635		
Conservative hold		Swing		

=== Timperley (2) ===
Timperley (2)
Party	Candidate	Votes	%	±%
Liberal	W. H. Cawdron	830	41.3	+8.5
Conservative	J. K. Jagger	815	40.5	−5.3
Labour	J. B. Cullingworth	366	18.2	−3.2
Majority		15	0.8	
Turnout		2,011		
Liberal gain from Conservative		Swing		

=== Timperley (3) ===
Timperley (3)
Party	Candidate	Votes	%	±%
Conservative	R. Kirkland	852	44.8	−9.5
Liberal	D. Dickson	782	41.1	−4.6
Labour	H. Atkinson	268	14.1	N/A
Majority		70	3.7	−4.9
Turnout		1,902		
Conservative hold		Swing		

=== Timperley (4) ===
Timperley (4)
Party	Candidate	Votes	%	±%
Conservative	A. Melvin Turner*	1,611	53.2	−0.6
Labour	R. Tomlinson	1,420	46.8	+0.6
Majority		191	6.4	−1.2
Turnout		3,031		
Conservative hold		Swing		

== By-elections between 1958 and 1959 ==
Timperley (4) By-election 27 November 1958
Party	Candidate	Votes	%	±%
Labour	H. Wharton	1,363	52.2	+5.4
Conservative	E. M. Hodgson	1,250	47.8	−5.4
Majority		113	4.3	
Turnout		2,613		
Labour gain from Conservative		Swing		
