= 1945 Altrincham Municipal Borough Council election =

Local election in Cheshire, England

← 1938	1 November 1945	1946 →

9 of 28 seats to Altrincham Municipal Borough Council 14 seats needed for a majority
	First party	Second party
Party	Independent	Labour
Last election	5 seats, 55.5%	2 seats, 44.5%
Seats before	21	7
Seats won	7	2
Seats after	22	6
Seat change	▲1	▼1
Popular vote	11,259	8,465
Percentage	57.1%	42.9%
Swing	▲1.6%	▼1.6%
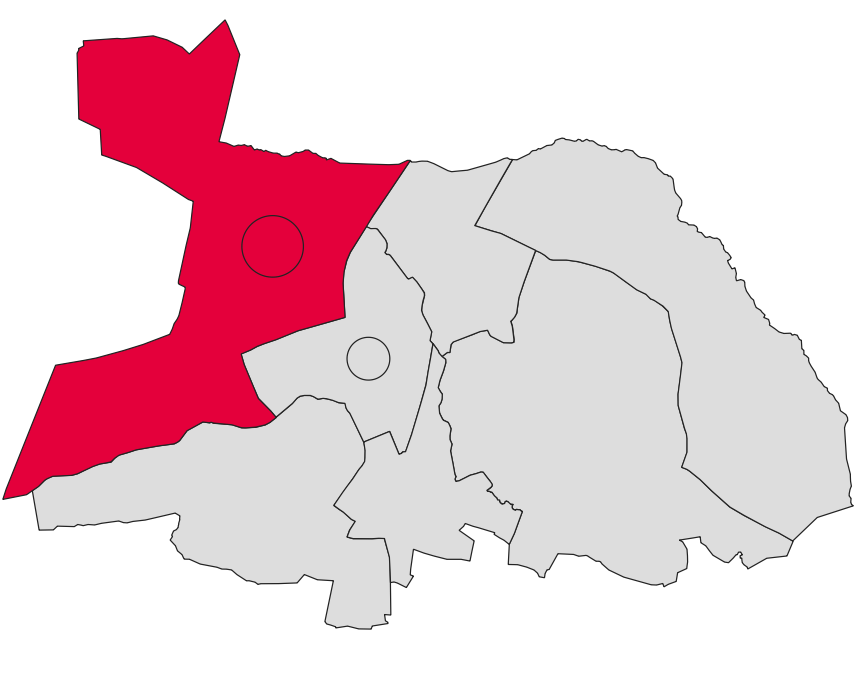
- Map of results of 1945 election
Leader of the Council before election
Independent
Leader of the Council after election
Independent

Elections to Altrincham Council were held on Thursday, 1 November 1945. One third of the councillors were up for election, with each successful candidate to serve a three-year term of office. Independents retained overall control of the council. These were the first local elections held in Altrincham since the outbreak of the Second World War.

== Election result ==
Party	Votes		Seats			Full Council	
Independent	11,259 (57.1%)	▲1.6	7 (77.8%)	7 / 9	▲1	22 (78.6%)	22 / 28
Labour Party	8,465 (42.9%)	▼1.6	2 (22.2%)	2 / 9	▼1	6 (21.4%)	6 / 28

=== Full council ===
↓
6	22

=== Aldermen ===
↓
2	5

=== Councillors ===
↓
4	17

== Ward results ==
=== Dunham ===
Dunham (2 vacancies)
Party	Candidate	Votes	%	±%
Labour	J. Baxter	1,181	30.6	
Labour	J. J. Cummins*	1,066	27.6	
Independent	H. Cowsill	879	22.8	
Independent	B. Freeman	731	19.0	
Majority		187	4.8	
Turnout		3,857		
Labour hold		Swing		
Labour hold		Swing		

=== East Central ===
East Central
Party	Candidate	Votes	%	±%
Independent	T. Clayton*	1,049	57.5	N/A
Labour	J. Cogan	775	42.5	N/A
Majority		274	15.0	
Turnout		1,824		
Independent hold		Swing		

=== North ===
North (2 vacancies)
Party	Candidate	Votes	%	±%
Independent	W. G. H. Biddle*	1,391	31.4	N/A
Independent	E. Odlin	1,267	28.6	N/A
Labour	G. Cook*	888	20.0	N/A
Labour	S. C. Whitehead	886	20.0	N/A
Majority		379	8.6	
Turnout		4,432		
Independent hold		Swing		
Independent gain from Labour		Swing		

=== South West ===
South West
Party	Candidate	Votes	%	±%
Independent	W. W. Stanier	1,125	63.9	N/A
Labour	M. Twigg	635	36.1	N/A
Majority		490	27.8	
Turnout		1,760		
Independent hold		Swing		

=== Timperley (1) ===
Timperley (1)
Party	Candidate	Votes	%	±%
Independent	W. H. Walker*	1,226	59.3	+7.4
Labour	C. Holt	841	40.7	−7.4
Majority		385	18.6	+14.8
Turnout		2,067		
Independent hold		Swing		

=== Timperley (2) ===
Timperley (2)
Party	Candidate	Votes	%	±%
Independent	F. Gibson	1,733	59.2	−8.1
Labour	A. M. Atherton	1,195	40.8	+8.1
Majority		538	18.4	−16.2
Turnout		2,928		
Independent hold		Swing		

=== Timperley (3) ===
Timperley (3)
Party	Candidate	Votes	%	±%
Independent	A. S. Jarratt	1,780	64.1	−2.2
Labour	W. Fretwell	998	35.9	+2.2
Majority		782	28.1	−4.4
Turnout		2,778		
Independent hold		Swing		
