= 1951 Altrincham Municipal Borough Council election =

Local election in England

- 10 May 1951

8 of 32 seats to Altrincham Municipal Borough Council 16 seats needed for a majority
	First party	Second party	Third party
Party	Conservative	Independent	Labour
Last election	7 seats, 61.0%	0 seats, 0.0%	1 seats, 39.0%
Seats before	22	8	2
Seats won	4	2	2
Seats after	20	8	4
Seat change	▼2	Steady	▲2
Popular vote	2,869	3,092	2,938
Percentage	32.2%	34.7%	33.0%
Swing	▼28.8%	▲34.7%	▼6.0%
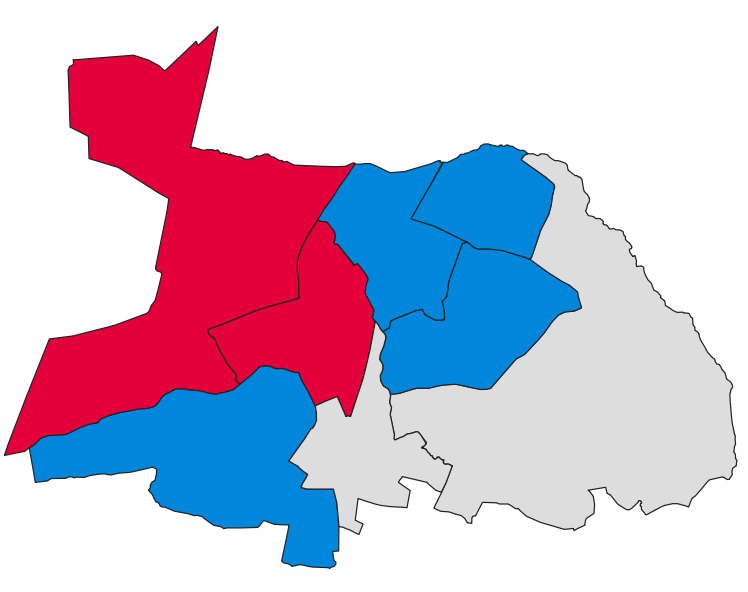
- Map of results of 1951 election
Leader of the Council before election
Conservative
Leader of the Council after election
Conservative

Elections to Altrincham Council were held on Thursday, 10 May 1951. One third of the councillors were up for election, with each successful candidate to serve a three-year term of office. The Conservative Party retained overall control of the council.

== Election result ==
Party	Votes		Seats			Full Council	
Conservative Party	2,869 (32.2%)	▼28.8	4 (50.0%)	4 / 8	▼2	20 (62.5%)	20 / 32
Independent	3,092 (34.7%)	▲34.7	2 (25.0%)	2 / 8	Steady	8 (25.0%)	8 / 32
Labour Party	2,938 (33.0%)	▼6.0	2 (25.0%)	2 / 8	▲2	4 (12.5%)	4 / 32

=== Full council ===
↓
4	8	20

=== Aldermen ===
↓
5	3

=== Councillors ===
↓
4	3	17

== Ward results ==
=== Dunham ===
Dunham
Party	Candidate	Votes	%	±%
Labour	R. Mason	1,084	57.1	N/A
Conservative	E. Ormerod	816	42.9	N/A
Majority		268	14.1	
Turnout		1,900		
Labour gain from Conservative		Swing		

=== East Central ===
East Central
Party	Candidate	Votes	%	±%
Independent	J. A. Yarwood	899	52.6	N/A
Conservative	A. R. Littler*	811	47.4	−18.2
Majority		88	5.2	
Turnout		1,710		
Independent gain from Conservative		Swing		

=== North ===
North
Party	Candidate	Votes	%	±%
Labour	J. E. Chapman	871	51.3	+3.7
Independent	E. Odlin*	826	48.7	N/A
Majority		45	2.7	
Turnout		1,697		
Labour gain from Independent		Swing		

=== South West ===
South West
Party	Candidate	Votes	%	±%
Conservative	T. C. Lochhead	1,242	76.6	N/A
Labour	D. R. Hughes	380	23.4	N/A
Majority		862	53.2	
Turnout		1,622		
Conservative hold		Swing		

=== Timperley (1) ===
Timperley (1)
Party	Candidate	Votes	%	±%
Conservative	R. S. Watson*	uncontested		
Conservative hold		Swing		

=== Timperley (2) ===
Timperley (2)
Party	Candidate	Votes	%	±%
Conservative	R. M. Kelsall*	uncontested		
Conservative hold		Swing		

=== Timperley (3) ===
Timperley (3)
Party	Candidate	Votes	%	±%
Conservative	F. Marsland*	uncontested		
Conservative hold		Swing		

=== Timperley (4) ===
Timperley (4)
Party	Candidate	Votes	%	±%
Independent	F. Gibson*	1,367	69.4	N/A
Labour	G. Harmer	603	30.6	N/A
Majority		764	38.8	
Turnout		1,970		
Independent hold		Swing		
