= 1971 Altrincham Municipal Borough Council election =

Local Election in Cheshire, England

← 1970	13 May 1971	1972 →

10 of 32 seats to Altrincham Municipal Borough Council 16 seats needed for a majority
	First party	Second party	Third party
Party	Conservative	Labour	Liberal
Last election	4 seats, 36.8%	2 seats, 25.0%	2 seats, 25.4%
Seats before	22	4	4
Seats won	3	4	3
Seats after	17	7	6
Seat change	▼5	▲3	▲2
Popular vote	5,842	4,999	5,018
Percentage	36.3%	31.0%	31.2%
Swing	▼0.5%	▲4.2%	▲5.8%
	Fourth party
Party	Independent
Last election	0 seats, 0.0%
Seats before	2
Seats won	0
Seats after	2
Seat change	Steady
Popular vote	0
Percentage	0.0%
Swing	Steady
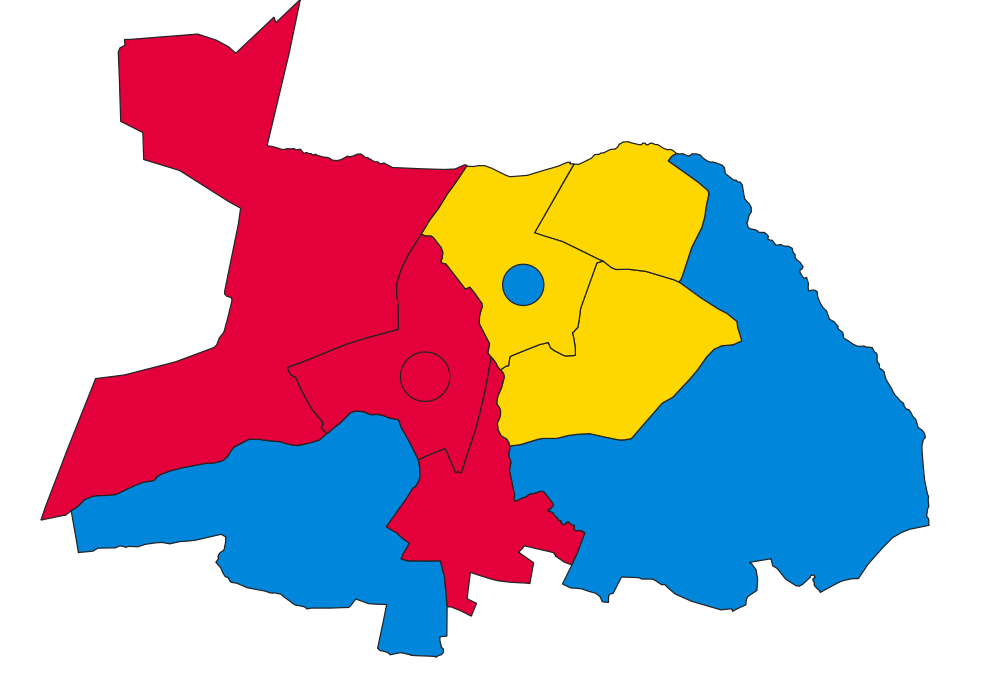
- Map of results of 1971 election
Leader of the Council before election
Conservative
Leader of the Council after election
Conservative

Elections to Altrincham Council were held on Thursday, 13 May 1971. One third of the councillors were up for election, with each successful candidate to serve a three-year term of office. The Conservative Party retained overall control of the council.

== Election result ==
Party	Votes		Seats			Full Council	
Conservative Party	5,842 (36.3%)	▼0.5	3 (30.0%)	3 / 10	▼5	17 (53.1%)	17 / 32
Labour Party	4,999 (31.0%)	▲6.0	4 (40.0%)	4 / 10	▲3	7 (21.7%)	7 / 32
Liberal Party	5,018 (31.2%)	▲5.8	3 (30.0%)	3 / 10	▲2	6 (18.8%)	6 / 32
Independent	0 (0.0%)	Steady	0 (0.0%)	0 / 10	Steady	2 (6.3%)	2 / 32
Communist Party	245 (1.5%)	▼0.4	0 (0.0%)	0 / 10	Steady	0 (0.0%)	0 / 32

=== Full council ===
↓
7	6	2	17

=== Aldermen ===
↓
1	2	5

=== Councillors ===
↓
6	6	12

== Ward results ==
=== Dunham ===
Dunham
Party	Candidate	Votes	%	±%
Labour	E. M. Hoyle*	1,184	94.9	+29.0
Communist	A. Cooper	63	5.1	+2.3
Majority		1,121	89.8	+61.2
Turnout		1,247		
Labour hold		Swing		

=== East Central ===
East Central
Party	Candidate	Votes	%	±%
Labour	R. Crossman	746	64.3	+9.7
Conservative	H. Scholar	415	35.7	−9.7
Majority		331	28.6	+19.4
Turnout		1,161		
Labour gain from Conservative		Swing		

=== North ===
North (2 vacancies)
Party	Candidate	Votes	%	±%
Labour	J. Webb	893	28.9	
Labour	W. Oliver	876	28.4	
Conservative	W. Simm	571	18.5	
Conservative	V. T. J. Symond	565	18.3	
Communist	E. Sheldon	182	5.9	
Majority		305	9.9	
Turnout		3,087		
Labour gain from Conservative		Swing		
Labour gain from Conservative		Swing		

=== South West ===
South West
Party	Candidate	Votes	%	±%
Conservative	K. Harrison*	uncontested		
Conservative hold		Swing		

=== Timperley (1) ===
Timperley (1) (2 vacancies)
Party	Candidate	Votes	%	±%
Liberal	E. Faulkner	795	26.6	N/A
Conservative	F. R. Metcalf*	753	25.2	N/A
Liberal	B. C. Lynch	738	24.7	N/A
Conservative	H. E. Ablard	702	28.4	N/A
Majority		15	0.5	
Turnout		2,988		
Liberal gain from Conservative		Swing		
Conservative hold		Swing		

=== Timperley (2) ===
Timperley (2)
Party	Candidate	Votes	%	±%
Liberal	M. R. Farnsworth	993	52.9	0
Conservative	A. E. Jackson*	885	47.1	0
Majority		108	5.8	0
Turnout		1,878		
Liberal gain from Conservative		Swing		

=== Timperley (3) ===
Timperley (3)
Party	Candidate	Votes	%	±%
Liberal	M. W. F. Hiett*	1,465	70.7	+4.7
Conservative	E. Nisbet	607	29.3	−4.7
Majority		858	41.4	+9.4
Turnout		2,072		
Liberal hold		Swing		

=== Timperley (4) ===
Timperley (4)
Party	Candidate	Votes	%	±%
Conservative	A. R. Weedall*	1,344	36.6	N/A
Labour	J. Hutchinson	1,300	35.4	N/A
Liberal	R. Bowker	1,027	28.0	N/A
Majority		44	1.2	
Turnout		3,671		
Conservative hold		Swing		
