= 1970 Altrincham Municipal Borough Council election =

Local election in Cheshire, England

← 1969	7 May 1970	1971 →

8 of 32 seats to Altrincham Municipal Borough Council 16 seats needed for a majority
	First party	Second party	Third party
Party	Conservative	Labour	Liberal
Last election	6 seats, 58.7%	0 seats, 20.8%	1 seats, 17.9%
Seats before	24	4	3
Seats won	4	2	2
Seats after	22	5	4
Seat change	▼2	▲1	▲1
Popular vote	3,355	2,280	2,318
Percentage	36.8%	25.0%	25.4%
Swing	▼21.9%	▲4.2%	▲7.5%
	Fourth party
Party	Independent
Last election	0 seats, 0.0%
Seats before	1
Seats won	0
Seats after	1
Seat change	Steady
Popular vote	0
Percentage	0.0%
Swing	Steady
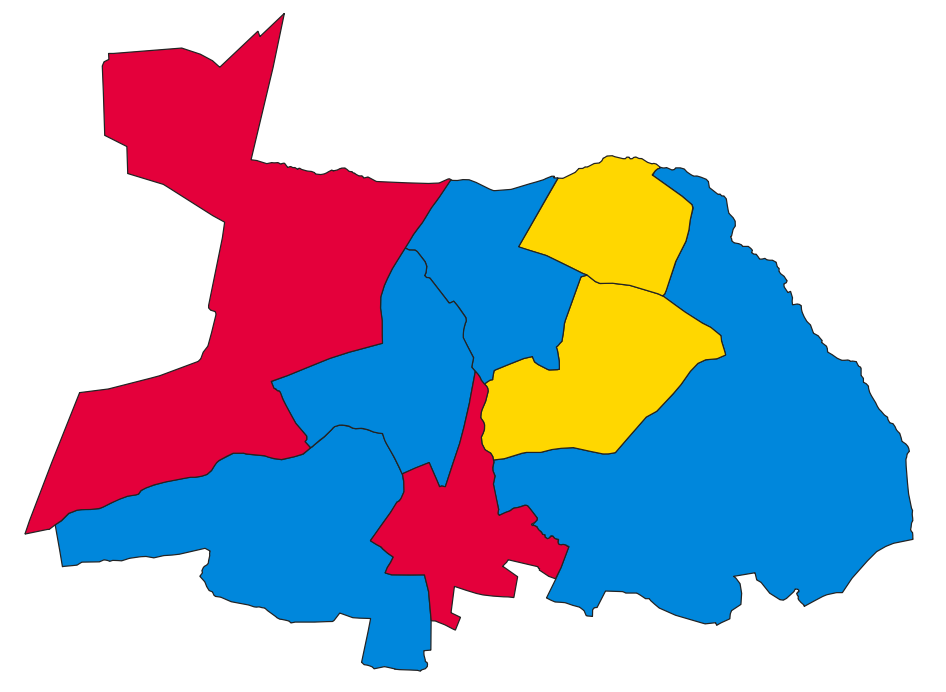
- Map of results of 1970 election
Leader of the Council before election
Conservative
Leader of the Council after election
Conservative

Elections to Altrincham Council were held on Thursday, 7 May 1970. One third of the councillors were up for election, with each successful candidate to serve a three-year term of office. The Conservative Party retained overall control of the council.

== Election result ==
Party	Votes		Seats			Full Council	
Conservative Party	3,355 (36.8%)	▼21.9	4 (50.0%)	4 / 8	▼2	22 (68.8%)	22 / 32
Labour Party	2,280 (25.0%)	▲4.3	2 (25.0%)	2 / 8	▲1	5 (15.6%)	5 / 32
Liberal Party	2,318 (25.4%)	▲7.5	2 (25.0%)	2 / 8	▲1	4 (12.5%)	4 / 32
Independent	0 (0.0%)	Steady	0 (0.0%)	0 / 8	Steady	1 (3.1%)	1 / 32
Communist Party	175 (1.9%)	▼0.7	0 (0.0%)	0 / 8	Steady	0 (0.0%)	0 / 32

=== Full council ===
↓
5	4	1	22

=== Aldermen ===
↓
2	1	5

=== Councillors ===
↓
3	4	17

== Ward results ==
=== Dunham ===
Dunham
Party	Candidate	Votes	%	±%
Labour	G. Hoyle*	1,099	65.9	+35.2
Conservative	A. Whitehurst	522	31.3	−26.0
Communist	B. Rothman	46	2.8	−9.2
Majority		577	28.6	
Turnout		1,667		
Labour hold		Swing		

=== East Central ===
East Central
Party	Candidate	Votes	%	±%
Labour	C. R. Tyrie	589	54.6	+12.2
Conservative	H. Scholar	489	45.4	−12.2
Majority		100	9.2	
Turnout		1,078		
Labour gain from Conservative		Swing		

=== North ===
North
Party	Candidate	Votes	%	±%
Conservative	D. W. Stroud	795	52.4	
Labour	W. J. Webb	592	39.1	
Communist	E. Sheldon	129	8.5	
Majority		203	13.3	
Turnout		1,516		
Conservative hold		Swing		

=== South West ===
South West
Party	Candidate	Votes	%	±%
Conservative	W. A. Ryder	uncontested		
Conservative hold		Swing		

=== Timperley (1) ===
Timperley (1)
Party	Candidate	Votes	%	±%
Conservative	W. A. Cragg*	uncontested		
Conservative hold		Swing		

=== Timperley (2) ===
Timperley (2)
Party	Candidate	Votes	%	±%
Liberal	J. W. Davenport	945	52.9	+13.5
Conservative	H. E. Ablard	843	47.1	−3.5
Majority		102	5.8	
Turnout		1,788		
Liberal gain from Conservative		Swing		

=== Timperley (3) ===
Timperley (3)
Party	Candidate	Votes	%	±%
Liberal	D. Harper*	1,373	66.0	+2.7
Conservative	V. T. J. Symond	706	34.0	−2.7
Majority		667	32.0	+4.4
Turnout		2,079		
Liberal hold		Swing		

=== Timperley (4) ===
Timperley (4)
Party	Candidate	Votes	%	±%
Conservative	D. Sheldon	uncontested		
Conservative hold		Swing		
