= 1956 Altrincham Municipal Borough Council election =

Local election in Cheshire, England

- 10 May 1956

8 of 32 seats to Altrincham Municipal Borough Council 16 seats needed for a majority
	First party	Second party	Third party
Party	Conservative	Independent	Labour
Last election	6 seats, 62.3%	0 seats, 0.0%	2 seats, 28.0%
Seats before	18	8	6
Seats won	6	0	2
Seats after	19	7	6
Seat change	▲1	▼1	Steady
Popular vote	4,717	434	4,351
Percentage	46.0%	4.2%	42.4%
Swing	▼16.3%	▲4.2%	▲14.4%
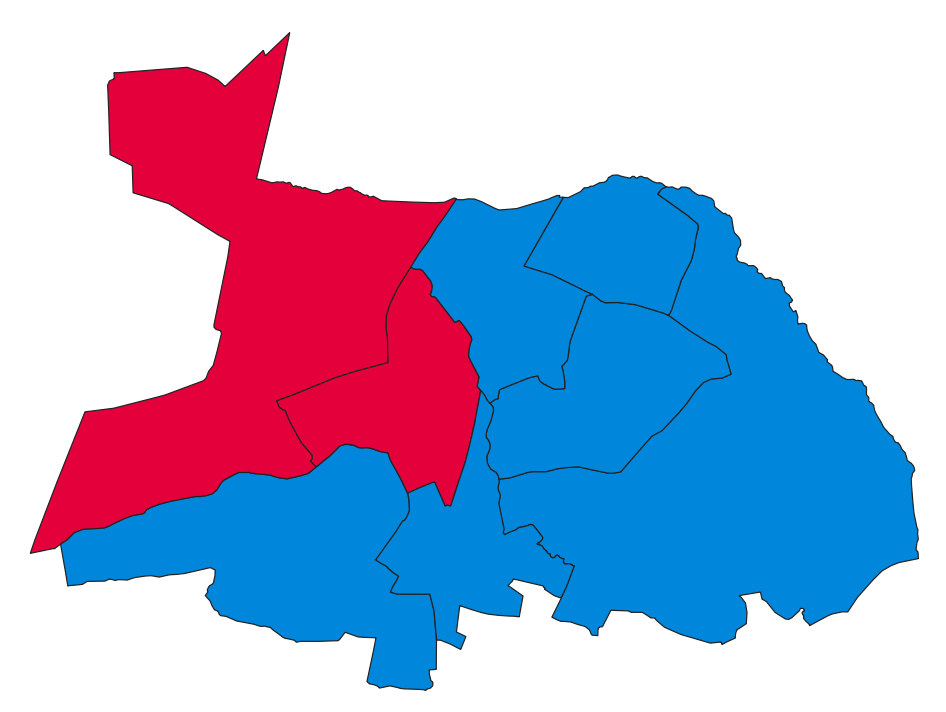
- Map of results of 1956 election
Leader of the Council before election
Conservative
Leader of the Council after election
Conservative

Elections to Altrincham Council were held on Thursday, 10 May 1956. One third of the councillors were up for election, with each successful candidate to serve a three-year term of office. The Conservative Party retained overall control of the council.

== Election result ==
Party	Votes		Seats			Full Council	
Conservative Party	4,717 (46.0%)	▼16.3	6 (75.0%)	6 / 8	▲1	19 (59.4%)	19 / 32
Independent	434 (4.2%)	▲4.2	0 (0.0%)	0 / 8	▼1	7 (21.9%)	7 / 32
Labour Party	4,351 (42.4%)	▲14.4	2 (25.0%)	2 / 8	Steady	6 (18.8%)	6 / 32
Liberal Party	762 (7.4%)	▼2.3	0 (0.0%)	0 / 8	Steady	0 (0.0%)	0 / 32

=== Full council ===
↓
6	7	19

=== Aldermen ===
↓
5	3

=== Councillors ===
↓
6	2	16

== Ward results ==
=== Dunham ===
Dunham
Party	Candidate	Votes	%	±%
Labour	E. M. Hoyle	1,095	71.6	N/A
Independent	H. M. Hodgson	434	28.4	N/A
Majority		661	43.2	
Turnout		1,529		
Labour hold		Swing		

=== East Central ===
East Central
Party	Candidate	Votes	%	±%
Conservative	E. H. Chorlton*	770	55.9	−10.6
Labour	W. J. Webb	608	44.1	+10.6
Majority		162	11.8	−21.2
Turnout		1,378		
Conservative hold		Swing		

=== North ===
North
Party	Candidate	Votes	%	±%
Labour	L. M. Smith*	1,082	60.2	+9.7
Conservative	E. Odlin	716	39.8	−9.7
Majority		366	20.4	+19.4
Turnout		1,798		
Labour hold		Swing		

=== South West ===
South-West
Party	Candidate	Votes	%	±%
Conservative	E. J. Horley*	uncontested		
Conservative hold		Swing		

=== Timperley (1) ===
Timperley (1)
Party	Candidate	Votes	%	±%
Conservative	R. F. Legat	uncontested		
Conservative gain from Independent		Swing		

=== Timperley (2) ===
Timperley (2)
Party	Candidate	Votes	%	±%
Conservative	J. C. Partridge*	830	52.1	0
Liberal	G. C. Dickson	762	47.9	0
Majority		68	4.2	0
Turnout		1,592		
Conservative hold		Swing		

=== Timperley (3) ===
Timperley (3)
Party	Candidate	Votes	%	±%
Conservative	I. M. MacLennan*	925	68.2	N/A
Labour	N. S. Smith	431	31.8	N/A
Majority		494	36.4	
Turnout		1,356		
Conservative hold		Swing		

=== Timperley (4) ===
Timperley (4)
Party	Candidate	Votes	%	±%
Conservative	E. M. Fitton*	1,476	56.5	−6.6
Labour	R. Tomlinson	1,135	43.5	+6.6
Majority		341	13.0	−13.3
Turnout		2,611		
Conservative hold		Swing		
