= 1972 Altrincham Municipal Borough Council election =

Local Election in Cheshire, England

| ← 1971 | 4 May 1972 | 1973 Trafford → |

9 of 32 seats to Altrincham Municipal Borough Council 16 seats needed for a majority
| | First party | Second party | Third party |
|---|---|---|---|
| Party | Labour | Conservative | Liberal |
| Last election | 4 seats, 31.0% | 3 seats, 36.8% | 3 seats, 31.2% |
| Seats before | 8 | 17 | 6 |
| Seats won | 5 | 2 | 3 |
| Seats after | 12 | 11 | 8 |
| Seat change | ▲4 | ▼6 | ▲2 |
| Popular vote | 5,749 | 5,557 | 5,018 |
| Percentage | 33.8% | 32.6% | 32.4% |
| Swing | ▲2.8% | ▼3.7% | ▲1.2% |
| | Fourth party |
| Party | Independent |
| Last election | 0 seats, 0.0% |
| Seats before | 1 |
| Seats won | 0 |
| Seats after | 1 |
| Seat change | Steady |
| Popular vote | 0 |
| Percentage | 0.0% |
| Swing | Steady |
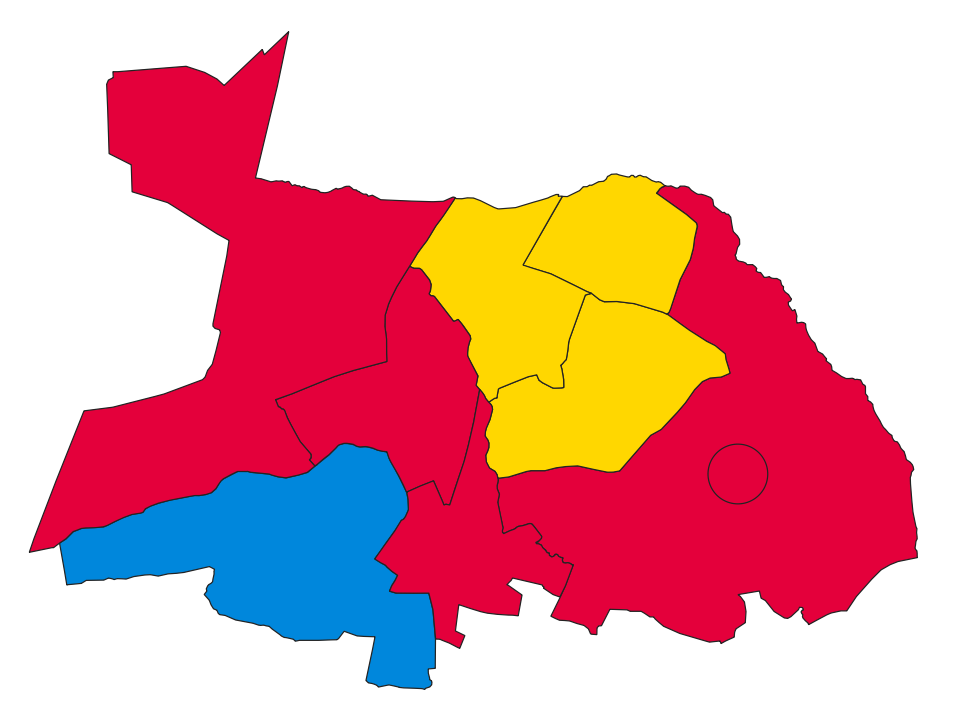
- Map of results of 1972 election
Leader of the Council before election
Conservative
Leader of the Council after election
No overall control

Elections to Altrincham Council were held on Thursday, 4 May 1972. One third of the councillors were up for election, with each successful candidate to serve a two-year term of office. These were the final elections held in Altrincham before it became part of Trafford. The Conservative Party lost overall control of the council.

== Election result ==
| Party | Votes | | Seats | | | Full Council | |
| Labour Party | 5,749 (33.8%) | ▲2.8 | 5 (55.6%) | 5 / 9 | ▲4 | 12 (37.5%) | 12 / 32 |
| Conservative Party | 5,557 (32.6%) | ▼3.7 | 1 (11.1%) | 1 / 9 | ▼6 | 11 (34.4%) | 11 / 32 |
| Liberal Party | 5,521 (32.4%) | ▲1.2 | 3 (33.3%) | 3 / 9 | ▲2 | 8 (25.0%) | 8 / 32 |
| Independent | 0 (0.0%) | Steady | 0 (0.0%) | 0 / 9 | Steady | 1 (3.1%) | 1 / 32 |
| Communist Party | 203 (1.2%) | ▼0.3 | 0 (0.0%) | 0 / 9 | Steady | 0 (0.0%) | 0 / 32 |

=== Full council ===
↓
| 12 | 8 | 1 | 11 |

=== Aldermen ===
↓
| 2 | 1 | 5 |

=== Councillors ===
↓
| 10 | 8 | 6 |

== Ward results ==
=== Dunham ===
Dunham
| Party | Candidate | Votes | % | ±% |
|---|---|---|---|---|
| Labour | J. Hutchinson | 872 | 64.2 | −30.7 |
| Conservative | I. N. Dixon | 424 | 31.2 | N/A |
| Communist | A. Cooper | 63 | 4.6 | −0.5 |
| Majority | | 448 | 33.0 | −56.8 |
| Turnout | | 1,359 | 40.9 | |
| Labour gain from Conservative | | Swing | | |

=== East Central ===
East Central
| Party | Candidate | Votes | % | ±% |
|---|---|---|---|---|
| Labour | P. McGarry | 571 | 60.6 | −3.7 |
| Conservative | F. D. Whiteley | 372 | 39.4 | +3.7 |
| Majority | | 199 | 21.2 | −7.4 |
| Turnout | | 943 | 35.5 | |
| Labour gain from Conservative | | Swing | | |

=== North ===
North
| Party | Candidate | Votes | % | ±% |
|---|---|---|---|---|
| Labour | W. Oliver* | 693 | 83.2 | |
| Communist | E. Sheldon | 140 | 16.8 | |
| Majority | | 553 | 66.4 | |
| Turnout | | 833 | 25.2 | |
| Labour hold | | Swing | | |

=== South West ===
South West
| Party | Candidate | Votes | % | ±% |
|---|---|---|---|---|
| Conservative | J. B. Dunn* | uncontested | | |
| Conservative hold | | Swing | | |

=== Timperley (1) ===
Timperley (1)
| Party | Candidate | Votes | % | ±% |
|---|---|---|---|---|
| Liberal | B. C. Lynch | 871 | 51.7 | |
| Conservative | F. R. Metcalf* | 815 | 48.3 | |
| Majority | | 56 | 3.4 | |
| Turnout | | 1,686 | 50.0 | |
| Liberal gain from Conservative | | Swing | | |

=== Timperley (2) ===
Timperley (2)
| Party | Candidate | Votes | % | ±% |
|---|---|---|---|---|
| Liberal | J. R. Richardson | 1,066 | 60.4 | +7.5 |
| Conservative | J. Somerset* | 700 | 39.6 | −7.5 |
| Majority | | 366 | 20.8 | +15.0 |
| Turnout | | 1,766 | 52.8 | |
| Liberal gain from Conservative | | Swing | | |

=== Timperley (3) ===
Timperley (3)
| Party | Candidate | Votes | % | ±% |
|---|---|---|---|---|
| Liberal | S. Williamson* | 1,379 | 70.7 | 0 |
| Conservative | H. D. Burton | 571 | 29.3 | 0 |
| Majority | | 808 | 41.4 | 0 |
| Turnout | | 1,950 | 53.3 | |
| Liberal hold | | Swing | | |

=== Timperley (4) ===
Timperley (4) (2 vacancies)
| Party | Candidate | Votes | % | ±% |
|---|---|---|---|---|
| Labour | H. Wharton | 1,937 | 46.4 | +11.0 |
| Labour | V. Collett | 1,676 | 40.2 | +4.8 |
| Conservative | R. Holden | 1,366 | 32.7 | −3.9 |
| Liberal | R. Bowker | 1,325 | 31.7 | +3.7 |
| Conservative | D. Bowyer | 1,309 | 31.4 | −4.0 |
| Liberal | T. D. Ballard | 880 | 21.1 | −6.9 |
| Majority | | 310 | 7.4 | |
| Turnout | | 4,174 | 55.8 | |
| Labour gain from Conservative | | Swing | | |
| Labour gain from Conservative | | Swing | | |
