= 1953 Altrincham Municipal Borough Council election =

Local election in England

- 7 May 1953

8 of 32 seats to Altrincham Municipal Borough Council 16 seats needed for a majority
	First party	Second party	Third party
Party	Conservative	Independent	Labour
Last election	6 seats, 52.9%	0 seats, 0.0%	2 seats, 33.0%
Seats before	20	7	5
Seats won	6	0	2
Seats after	19	7	6
Seat change	▼1	Steady	▲1
Popular vote	4,584	0	3,014
Percentage	60.3%	0.0%	39.7%
Swing	▲7.4%	Steady	▲0.2%
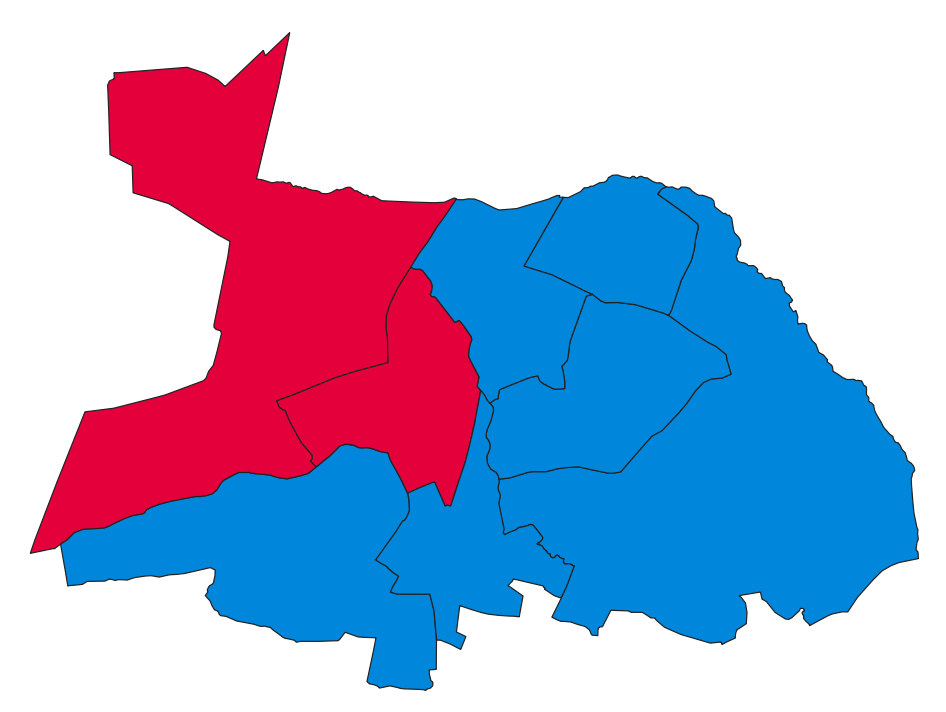
- Map of results of 1953 election
Leader of the Council before election
Conservative
Leader of the Council after election
Conservative

Elections to Altrincham Council were held on Thursday, 7 May 1953. One third of the councillors were up for election, with each successful candidate to serve a three-year term of office. The Conservative Party retained overall control of the council.

== Election result ==
Party	Votes		Seats			Full Council	
Conservative Party	4,584 (60.3%)	▲7.4	6 (75.0%)	6 / 8	▼1	19 (59.4%)	19 / 32
Independent	0 (0.0%)	Steady	0 (0.0%)	0 / 8	Steady	7 (21.9%)	7 / 32
Labour Party	3,014 (39.7%)	▲0.2	2 (25.0%)	2 / 8	▲1	6 (18.8%)	6 / 32

=== Full council ===
↓
6	7	19

=== Aldermen ===
↓
5	3

=== Councillors ===
↓
6	2	16

== Ward results ==
=== Dunham ===
Dunham
Party	Candidate	Votes	%	±%
Labour	A. Vesey*			
Labour hold		Swing		

=== East Central ===
East Central
Party	Candidate	Votes	%	±%
Conservative	E. H. Chorlton*	1,012	62.9	+5.0
Labour	K. S. Robinson	597	37.1	−5.0
Majority		415	25.8	+10.0
Turnout		1,609		
Conservative hold		Swing		

=== North ===
North
Party	Candidate	Votes	%	±%
Labour	L. Smith	1,112	55.0	+1.3
Conservative	H. Cowsill*	911	45.0	−1.3
Majority		201	10.0	+2.6
Turnout		2,023		
Labour gain from Conservative		Swing		

=== South West ===
South West
Party	Candidate	Votes	%	±%
Conservative	E. J. Horley*	uncontested		
Conservative hold		Swing		

=== Timperley (1) ===
Timperley (1)
Party	Candidate	Votes	%	±%
Conservative	J. L. Warren*	uncontested		
Conservative hold		Swing		

=== Timperley (2) ===
Timperley (2)
Party	Candidate	Votes	%	±%
Conservative	J. C. Partridge	1,220	68.1	+0.6
Labour	W. Yates	572	31.9	−0.6
Majority		648	36.2	+1.2
Turnout		1,792		
Conservative hold		Swing		

=== Timperley (3) ===
Timperley (3)
Party	Candidate	Votes	%	±%
Conservative	I. M. MacLennan*	uncontested		
Conservative hold		Swing		

=== Timperley (4) ===
Timperley (4)
Party	Candidate	Votes	%	±%
Conservative	E. M. Fitton*	1,441	66.3	N/A
Labour	R. Pendlebury	733	33.7	N/A
Majority		708	32.6	
Turnout		2,174		
Conservative hold		Swing		
