= 1959 Altrincham Municipal Borough Council election =

Local election in Cheshire, England

← 1958	7 May 1959	1960 →

8 of 32 seats to Altrincham Municipal Borough Council 16 seats needed for a majority
	First party	Second party	Third party
Party	Conservative	Labour	Independent
Last election	5 seats, 50.5%	2 seats, 37.3%	0 seats, 0.0%
Seats before	17	8	6
Seats won	4	3	0
Seats after	16	8	6
Seat change	▼1	Steady	Steady
Popular vote	8,078	4,868	0
Percentage	49.5%	29.8%	0.0%
Swing	▼1.0%	▼7.5%	Steady
	Fourth party
Party	Liberal
Last election	1 seats, 12.3%
Seats before	1
Seats won	1
Seats after	2
Seat change	▲1
Popular vote	3,387
Percentage	20.7%
Swing	▲8.4%
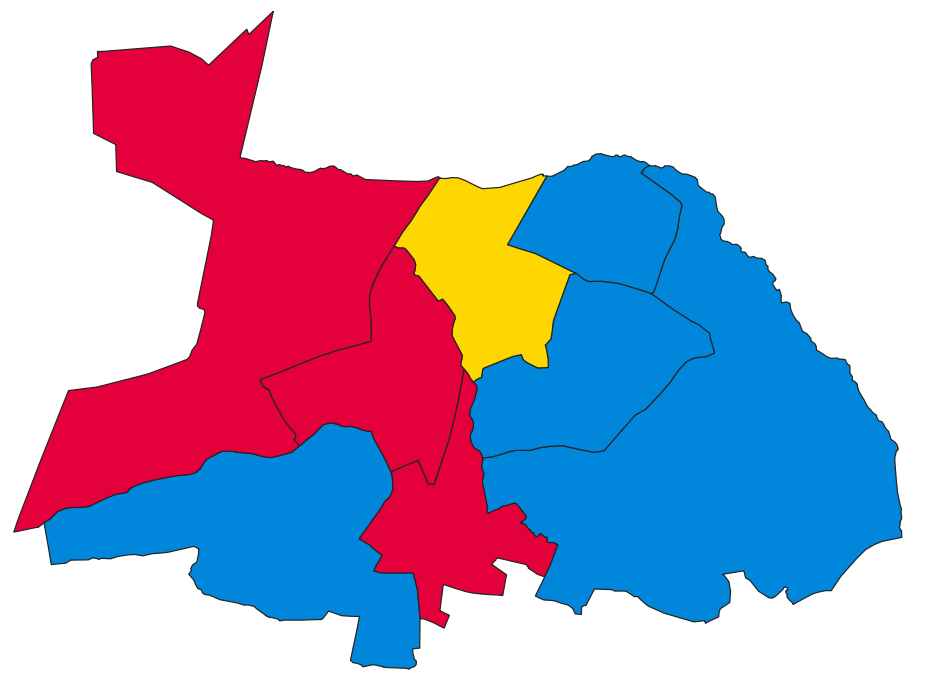
- Map of results of 1959 election
Leader of the Council before election
Conservative
Leader of the Council after election
Conservative

Elections to Altrincham Council were held on Thursday, 7 May 1959. One third of the councillors were up for election, with each successful candidate to serve a three-year term of office. The Conservative Party reatined overall control of the council.

== Election result ==
Party	Votes		Seats			Full Council	
Conservative Party	8,078 (49.5%)	▼1.0	4 (50.0%)	4 / 8	▼1	16 (50.0%)	16 / 32
Labour Party	4,868 (29.8%)	▼7.5	3 (37.5%)	3 / 8	Steady	8 (25.0%)	8 / 32
Independent	0 (0.0%)	Steady	0 (0.0%)	0 / 8	Steady	6 (18.8%)	6 / 32
Liberal Party	3,387 (20.7%)	▲8.4	1 (12.5%)	1 / 8	▲1	2 (6.3%)	2 / 32

=== Full council ===
↓
8	2	6	16

=== Aldermen ===
↓
5	3

=== Councillors ===
↓
8	2	1	13

== Ward results ==
=== Dunham ===
Dunham
Party	Candidate	Votes	%	±%
Labour	E. M. Hoyle*	1,318	70.2	N/A
Conservative	K. C. Jagger	559	29.8	N/A
Majority		759	40.4	
Turnout		1,877		
Labour hold		Swing		

=== East Central ===
East Central
Party	Candidate	Votes	%	±%
Labour	W. J. Webb*	860	50.1	+1.3
Conservative	T. Barry	858	49.9	−1.3
Majority		2	0.2	
Turnout		1,718		
Labour hold		Swing		

=== North ===
North
Party	Candidate	Votes	%	±%
Labour	L. M. Smith*	1,021	56.9	−0.2
Conservative	P. Oliver	773	43.1	+0.2
Majority		248	13.8	−0.4
Turnout		1,794		
Labour hold		Swing		

=== South West ===
South-West
Party	Candidate	Votes	%	±%
Conservative	D. Willeringhouse*	864	63.5	+1.0
Liberal	A. Gibbon	497	36.5	N/A
Majority		248	27.0	+2.0
Turnout		1,361		
Conservative hold		Swing		

=== Timperley (1) ===
Timperley (1)
Party	Candidate	Votes	%	±%
Liberal	M. Prickett	1,055	56.8	N/A
Conservative	R. F. Legat*	804	43.2	−18.8
Majority		274	13.7	
Turnout		1,859		
Liberal gain from Conservative		Swing		

=== Timperley (2) ===
Timperley (2)
Party	Candidate	Votes	%	±%
Conservative	J. C. Partridge*	919	44.7	+4.2
Liberal	P. Franklin	856	41.7	+0.4
Labour	J. B. Cullingworth	279	13.6	−4.6
Majority		63	3.0	
Turnout		2,054		
Conservative hold		Swing		

=== Timperley (3) ===
Timperley (3)
Party	Candidate	Votes	%	±%
Conservative	I. M. MacLennan*	1,027	51.2	+6.4
Liberal	D. Dickson	979	48.8	+7.7
Majority		48	2.4	−1.3
Turnout		2,006		
Conservative hold		Swing		

=== Timperley (4) ===
Timperley (4)
Party	Candidate	Votes	%	±%
Conservative	E. M. Fitton*	2,023	59.3	+6.1
Labour	R. Knowles	1,390	40.7	−6.1
Majority		633	18.6	+12.2
Turnout		3,413		
Conservative hold		Swing		
