= 1967 Altrincham Municipal Borough Council election =

Local election in Cheshire, England

← 1966	11 May 1967	1968 →

8 of 32 seats to Altrincham Municipal Borough Council 16 seats needed for a majority
	First party	Second party	Third party
Party	Conservative	Labour	Liberal
Last election	4 seats, 37.7%	3 seats, 37.6%	1 seats, 20.8%
Seats before	16	10	3
Seats won	6	1	1
Seats after	19	7	3
Seat change	▲3	▼3	Steady
Popular vote	5,556	3,923	1,949
Percentage	48.3%	34.1%	16.9%
Swing	▲10.6%	▼3.5%	▼3.9%
	Fourth party
Party	Independent
Last election	0 seats, 3.1%
Seats before	3
Seats won	0
Seats after	3
Seat change	Steady
Popular vote	0
Percentage	0.0%
Swing	▼3.1
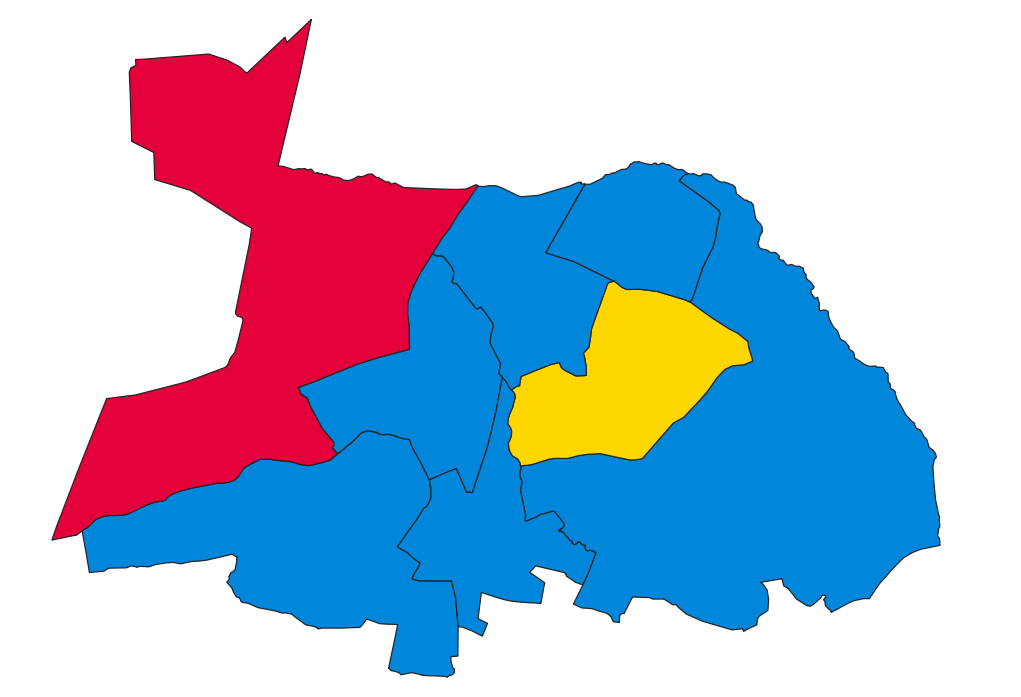
- Map of results of 1967 election
Leader of the Council before election
Conservative
Leader of the Council after election
Conservative

Elections to Altrincham Council were held on Thursday, 11 May 1967. One third of the councillors were up for election, with each successful candidate to serve a three-year term of office. The Conservative Party retained overall control of the council.

== Election result ==
Party	Votes		Seats			Full Council	
Conservative Party	5,556 (48.3%)	▲10.6	6 (75.0%)	6 / 8	▲3	19 (59.4%)	19 / 32
Labour Party	3,923 (34.1%)	▼3.5	1 (12.5%)	1 / 8	▼3	7 (21.9%)	7 / 32
Liberal Party	1,949 (16.9%)	▼3.9	1 (12.5%)	1 / 8	Steady	3 (9.4%)	3 / 32
Independent	0 (0.0%)	▼3.1	0 (0.0%)	0 / 8	Steady	3 (9.4%)	3 / 32
Communist Party	86 (0.7%)	▼0.2	0 (0.0%)	0 / 8	Steady	0 (0.0%)	0 / 32

=== Full council ===
↓
7	3	3	19

=== Aldermen ===
↓
1	3	4

=== Councillors ===
↓
6	3	15

== Ward results ==
=== Dunham ===
Dunham
Party	Candidate	Votes	%	±%
Labour	G. Hoyle*	883	91.1	+3.0
Communist	B. Rothman	86	8.9	−3.0
Majority		797	82.2	+6.0
Turnout		969		
Labour hold		Swing		

=== East Central ===
East Central
Party	Candidate	Votes	%	±%
Conservative	P. Daniels	511	53.6	N/A
Labour	R. E. Singer	442	46.4	−11.0
Majority		69	7.2	
Turnout		953		
Conservative gain from Labour		Swing		

=== North ===
North
Party	Candidate	Votes	%	±%
Conservative	M. G. Hensman	645	44.9	N/A
Labour	W. J. Webb	575	40.0	−19.2
Liberal	S. Hughes	216	15.1	−25.7
Majority		70	4.9	
Turnout		1,436		
Conservative gain from Labour		Swing		

=== South West ===
South West
Party	Candidate	Votes	%	±%
Conservative	W. S. Jones	651	60.2	−28.4
Liberal	R. Wilman	431	39.8	N/A
Majority		220	20.4	−56.8
Turnout		1,082		
Conservative hold		Swing		

=== Timperley (1) ===
Timperley (1)
Party	Candidate	Votes	%	±%
Conservative	W. A. Cragg*	881	71.1	+23.1
Labour	G. Potts	358	28.9	+5.3
Majority		523	42.2	+22.6
Turnout		1,239		
Conservative hold		Swing		

=== Timperley (2) ===
Timperley (2)
Party	Candidate	Votes	%	±%
Conservative	J. C. Partridge*	787	45.5	+7.0
Labour	C. R. Tyrie	592	35.3	+2.7
Liberal	J. T. Podmore	349	20.2	−9.7
Majority		195	11.2	+4.3
Turnout		1,728		
Conservative hold		Swing		

=== Timperley (3) ===
Timperley (3)
Party	Candidate	Votes	%	±%
Liberal	D. Harper*	953	54.7	6.8
Conservative	E. Richardson	789	45.3	+6.7
Majority		164	9.4	+0.1
Turnout		1,742		
Liberal hold		Swing		

=== Timperley (4) ===
Timperley (4)
Party	Candidate	Votes	%	±%
Conservative	J. Levey	1,292	54.6	−0.6
Labour	H. Wharton*	1,073	45.4	+0.6
Majority		219	9.2	−1.2
Turnout		2,365		
Conservative gain from Labour		Swing		
