= 1965 Altrincham Municipal Borough Council election =

Local election in Cheshire, England

← 1964	13 May 1965	1966 →

9 of 32 seats to Altrincham Municipal Borough Council 16 seats needed for a majority
	First party	Second party	Third party
Party	Conservative	Labour	Liberal
Last election	3 seats, 36.1%	4 seats, 29.0%	1 seats, 34.9%
Seats before	12	11	6
Seats won	6	2	1
Seats after	15	10	4
Seat change	▲3	▼1	▼2
Popular vote	7,162	3,633	3,950
Percentage	48.6%	24.6%	26.8%
Swing	▲12.5%	▼4.4%	▼8.1%
	Fourth party
Party	Independent
Last election	0 seats, 0.0%
Seats before	3
Seats won	0
Seats after	3
Seat change	Steady
Popular vote	0
Percentage	0.0%
Swing	Steady
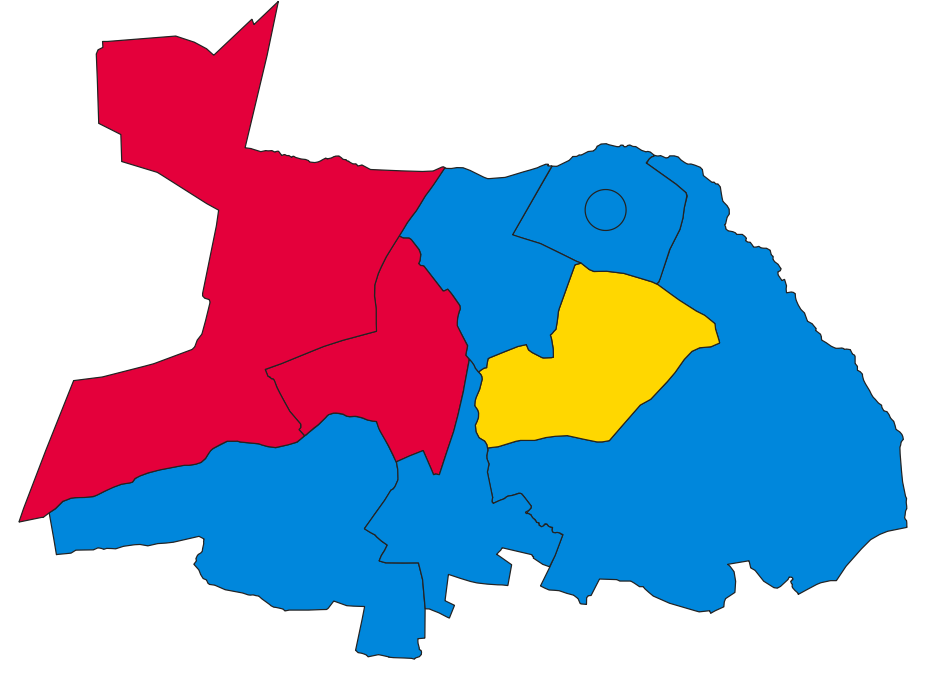
- Map of results of 1965 election
Leader of the Council before election
No overall control
Leader of the Council after election
No overall control

Elections to Altrincham Council were held on Thursday, 13 May 1965. One third of the councillors were up for election, with each successful candidate to serve a three-year term of office. The council remained under no overall control.

== Election result ==
Party	Votes		Seats			Full Council	
Conservative Party	7,162 (48.6%)	▲12.5	6 (66.7%)	6 / 9	▲3	15 (46.9%)	15 / 32
Labour Party	3,633 (24.6%)	▼4.4	2 (22.2%)	2 / 9	▼1	10 (31.6%)	10 / 32
Liberal Party	3,950 (26.8%)	▼8.1	1 (11.1%)	1 / 9	▼2	4 (12.5%)	4 / 32
Independent	0 (0.0%)	Steady	0 (0.0%)	0 / 9	Steady	3 (9.4%)	3 / 32

=== Full council ===
↓
10	4	3	15

=== Aldermen ===
↓
1	3	4

=== Councillors ===
↓
9	4	11

== Ward results ==
=== Dunham ===
Dunham
Party	Candidate	Votes	%	±%
Labour	E. M. Hoyle*	uncontested		
Labour hold		Swing		

=== East Central ===
East Central
Party	Candidate	Votes	%	±%
Conservative	S. T. Jenkinson	864	61.9	+20.8
Labour	W. J. Webb*	531	38.1	−3.2
Majority		333	23.8	
Turnout		1,395		
Conservative gain from Labour		Swing		

=== North ===
North
Party	Candidate	Votes	%	±%
Labour	L. M. Smith*	718	45.1	−11.2
Conservative	R. H. Alcock	481	30.2	N/A
Liberal	R. J. Waddington	394	24.7	−19.0
Majority		237	14.9	+2.3
Turnout		1,593		
Labour hold		Swing		

=== South West ===
South West
Party	Candidate	Votes	%	±%
Conservative	K. A. Harrison	834	64.6	+12.2
Liberal	J. D. Carter	458	35.4	−12.2
Majority		376	29.2	+24.4
Turnout		1,292		
Conservative hold		Swing		

=== Timperley (1) ===
Timperley (1)
Party	Candidate	Votes	%	±%
Conservative	F. R. Metcalf*	829	47.5	+9.4
Liberal	H. C. Kennedy	499	28.6	−1.2
Labour	D. Gill	416	23.9	−8.3
Majority		330	18.9	+13.0
Turnout		1,744		
Conservative hold		Swing		

=== Timperley (2) ===
Timperley (2) (2 vacancies)
Party	Candidate	Votes	%	±%
Conservative	A. E. Jackson	926	24.7	
Conservative	J. Somerset	830	22.1	
Liberal	P. Franklin*	646	17.2	
Liberal	R. G. Sharp	561	15.0	
Labour	C. R. Tyrie	396	10.6	
Labour	R. Wilman	389	10.4	
Majority		184	4.9	
Turnout		3,748		
Conservative gain from Liberal		Swing		
Conservative gain from Liberal		Swing		

=== Timperley (3) ===
Timperley (3)
Party	Candidate	Votes	%	±%
Liberal	M. W. F. Hiett*	1,029	53.9	−7.7
Conservative	F. J. Tansey	880	46.1	+7.7
Majority		149	7.8	−15.4
Turnout		1,909		
Liberal hold		Swing		

=== Timperley (4) ===
Timperley (4)
Party	Candidate	Votes	%	±%
Conservative	R. Hall*	1,518	49.5	+14.3
Labour	R. E. Singer	1,183	38.6	−10.0
Liberal	G. D. Whitworth	363	11.9	−4.3
Majority		335	10.9	
Turnout		2,856		
Conservative hold		Swing		
