= Municipal Borough of Altrincham =

Altrincham Urban District

Coordinates: 53°23′16.4″N 2°11′07.3″W

Altrincham
- Local Board District (1851–1894); Urban District (1894–1937); Municipal Borough (1937–1974)
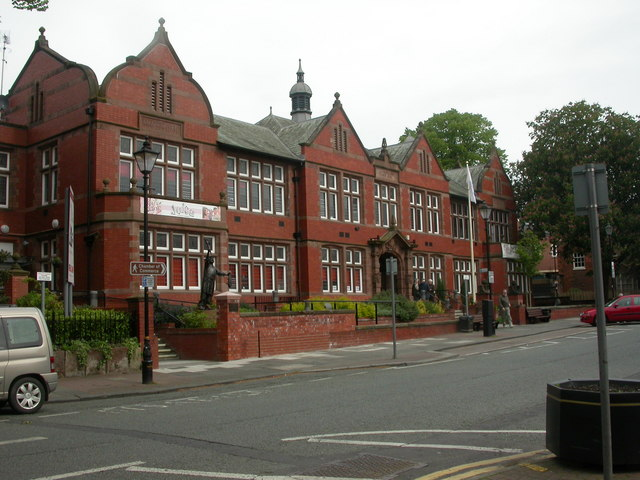
- Altrincham Town Hall

- Altrincham within Cheshire in 1970
- History
  - Succeeded by: Trafford Metropolitan Borough [Greater Manchester]

Altrincham was an administrative district covering the town of Altrincham in Cheshire, England. It was a local board district from 1851 to 1894, an urban district from 1894 to 1937, and a municipal borough from 1937 until 1974. It was abolished in 1974 under the Local Government Act 1972, and the area became a part of the new Metropolitan Borough of Trafford in Greater Manchester.

== History ==
The town of Altrincham had been a seigneurial borough from 1290, with a limited degree of self-governance whilst remaining under the jurisdiction of the lord of the manor. There was no formal borough corporation, with the mayor and other officers of the borough being appointed by the lord of the manor's court leet. Given the old borough's limited powers, it was left unreformed when the Municipal Corporations Act 1835 reformed most ancient boroughs across the country into municipal boroughs. The old borough was eventually abolished in 1886.

In order to provide more modern local government functions, Altrincham was made a local board district in 1851, administered by an elected local board. Local board districts were reconstituted as urban districts under the Local Government Act 1894. The urban district council built itself Altrincham Town Hall on Market Street in 1901 to serve as its headquarters. The urban district was enlarged in 1920 and again in 1936, when it absorbed the area of the abolished parish of Timperley.

In 1937, Altrincham Urban District was granted a charter of incorporation, converting it into a municipal borough. The charter was formally presented by Sir William Bromley-Davenport, Lord Lieutenant of Cheshire at a charter celebration day held on 31 July.

The Municipal Borough of Altrincham was abolished in 1974 under the Local Government Act 1972. The area became part of the Metropolitan Borough of Trafford in Greater Manchester.

== Political control ==
Following Altrincham's incorporation in 1937, the borough council consisted of a mayor, seven aldermen, and twenty-one councillors. In 1947 an additional ward was created bringing the total to eight aldermen, and twenty-four councillors. The charter mayor was the Earl of Stamford whose seat was Dunham Massey, just outside the town. One third of the councillors were elected annually, while half of the aldermen were elected by the council every three years.

The council initially consisted of two groupings, the dominant Independents and the Labour Party, the Independents held control from the borough's creation until 1949 Altrincham Municipal Borough Council election. In 1947, the Conservative Party contested local elections for the first time with eight of their ten candidates being elected, in 1949 they won overall control of the council which they held until 1961, most of the Independents either joined the Conservatives or were defeated. In 1958 the Liberal Party was elected to the council for the first time. From 1961 until 1966 the council was under no overall control with the Labour and Liberal groups outnumbering the Conservatives between 1962 and 1965. The Conservatives won control again in 1966 and held it until the council's final election in 1972 when they became the second-largest single party for the first time since 1949, and their only successful return was unopposed in South West ward.

Party	Period
Independent	1937-1949
Conservative	1949-1961
No overall control	1961-1966
Conservative	1966-1972
No overall control	1972-1974

== Local elections ==
- 1937 Altrincham Municipal Borough Council election
- 1938 Altrincham Municipal Borough Council election
- 1945 Altrincham Municipal Borough Council election
- 1946 Altrincham Municipal Borough Council election
- 1947 Altrincham Municipal Borough Council election
- 1949 Altrincham Municipal Borough Council election
- 1950 Altrincham Municipal Borough Council election
- 1951 Altrincham Municipal Borough Council election
- 1952 Altrincham Municipal Borough Council election
- 1953 Altrincham Municipal Borough Council election
- 1954 Altrincham Municipal Borough Council election
- 1955 Altrincham Municipal Borough Council election
- 1956 Altrincham Municipal Borough Council election
- 1957 Altrincham Municipal Borough Council election
- 1958 Altrincham Municipal Borough Council election
- 1959 Altrincham Municipal Borough Council election
- 1960 Altrincham Municipal Borough Council election
- 1961 Altrincham Municipal Borough Council election
- 1962 Altrincham Municipal Borough Council election
- 1963 Altrincham Municipal Borough Council election
- 1964 Altrincham Municipal Borough Council election
- 1965 Altrincham Municipal Borough Council election
- 1966 Altrincham Municipal Borough Council election
- 1967 Altrincham Municipal Borough Council election
- 1968 Altrincham Municipal Borough Council election
- 1969 Altrincham Municipal Borough Council election
- 1970 Altrincham Municipal Borough Council election
- 1971 Altrincham Municipal Borough Council election
- 1972 Altrincham Municipal Borough Council election
