= 1937 Altrincham Municipal Borough Council election =

1937 UK local government election

- 1 November 1937

21 of 28 seats to Altrincham Municipal Borough Council 15 seats needed for a majority
	First party	Second party
Party	Independent	Labour
Seats won	17	4
Seats after	23	5
Popular vote	15,336	1,736
Percentage	89.3%	10.6%
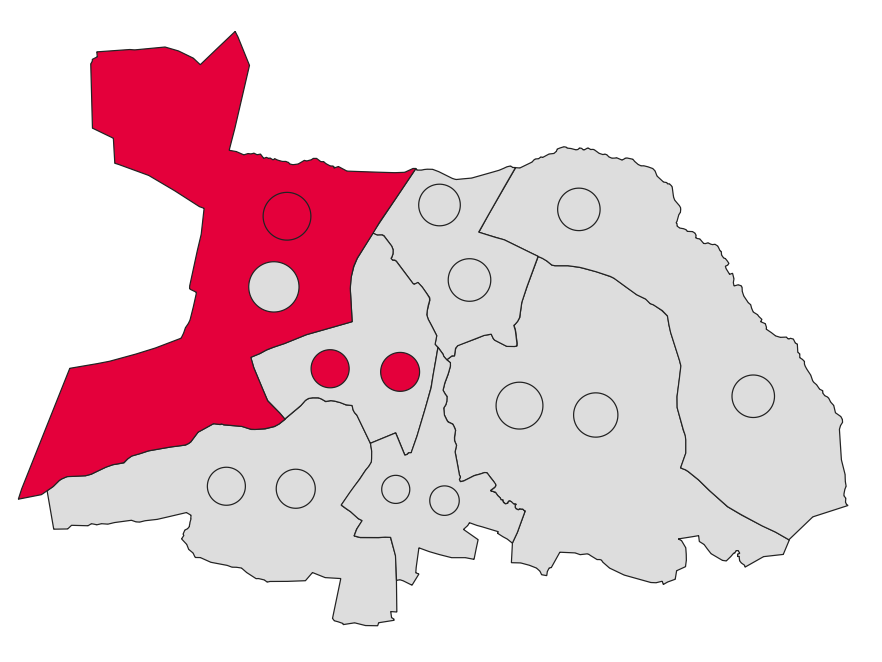
- Map of results of 1937 election
Leader of the Council after election
Independent

The first elections to Altrincham Council were held on Monday, 1 November 1937. This was a new council to replace Altrincham Urban District Council. This election would create the entire 28-member council (three councillors to each ward and seven aldermen) to administer the municipal borough. Independents won overall control of the council.

== Election result ==
Party	Votes	Seats		Full Council	
Independent	15,336 (89.3%)	17 (81.0%)	17 / 21	23 (82.1%)	23 / 28
Labour Party	1,736 (10.6%)	4 (19.0%)	4 / 21	5 (17.9%)	5 / 28

=== Full council ===
↓
5	23

=== Aldermen ===
↓
1	6

=== Councillors ===
↓
4	17

== Ward results ==
=== Dunham ===
Dunham
Party	Candidate	Votes	%	±%
Labour	T. C. Handford*	uncontested		
Labour	A. Vesey*	uncontested		
Independent	W. Waterhouse*	uncontested		
Labour win (new seat)				
Labour win (new seat)				
Independent win (new seat)				

=== East Central ===
East Central
Party	Candidate	Votes	%	±%
Independent	A. Whitley*	1,210	27.8	
Independent	A. E. Weston*	1,077	24.7	
Independent	J. S. Pearson*	1,035	23.8	
Independent	T. Clayton*	1,031	23.7	
Majority		4	0.1	
Turnout		4,353		
Independent win (new seat)				
Independent win (new seat)				
Independent win (new seat)				

=== North ===
North
Party	Candidate	Votes	%	±%
Independent	W. G. H. Biddle*	uncontested		
Labour	T. Farrar*	uncontested		
Labour	R. H. Lee*	uncontested		
Independent win (new seat)				
Labour win (new seat)				
Labour win (new seat)				

=== South West ===
South West
Party	Candidate	Votes	%	±%
Independent	S. N. Garner*	1,086	20.1	
Independent	P. Hewitt*	1,036	19.1	
Independent	T. P. Bell Houlden*	953	17.6	
Independent	H. Bailey*	815	15.1	
Independent	W. Bradley Jones*	782	14.4	
Independent	W. W. Stanier	741	13.7	
Majority		138	2.5	
Turnout		5,414		
Independent win (new seat)				
Independent win (new seat)				
Independent win (new seat)				

=== Timperley (1) ===
Timperley (1)
Party	Candidate	Votes	%	±%
Independent	J. L. Warren*	904	25.5	
Independent	W. H. Walker*	859	24.2	
Independent	A. Edge*	822	23.2	
Labour	F. B. Meadowcroft	501	15.1	
Labour	H. Keay	458	14.1	
Majority		321	9.1	
Turnout		3,544		
Independent win (new seat)				
Independent win (new seat)				
Independent win (new seat)				

=== Timperley (2) ===
Timperley (2)
Party	Candidate	Votes	%	±%
Independent	J. H. Cosgrove*	1,059	27.4	
Independent	C. Applewhite*	986	25.5	
Independent	G. C. Aldhouse	940	24.3	
Labour	J. J. Cummings	440	11.4	
Labour	A. Peacock	437	11.3	
Majority		500	12.9	
Turnout		3,862		
Independent win (new seat)				
Independent win (new seat)				
Independent win (new seat)				

=== Timperley (3) ===
Timperley (3)
Party	Candidate	Votes	%	±%
Independent	S. Dawson*	uncontested		
Independent	G. M. Rourke*	uncontested		
Independent	E. Webb*	uncontested		
Independent win (new seat)				
Independent win (new seat)				
Independent win (new seat)				

== Aldermanic election ==
Aldermanic elections took place at the council's inaugural meeting on 9 November 1937, all seven of the borough's aldermen were up for election by the council.

Altrincham Municipal Borough Aldermanic election
Party	Candidate	Votes	%	±%
Independent	C. Applewhite*	uncontested		
Independent	A. Edge*	uncontested		
Independent	S. N. Garner*	uncontested		
Labour	R. H. Lee*	uncontested		
Independent	W. Waterhouse*	uncontested		
Independent	E. Webb*	uncontested		
Independent	A. E. Weston*	uncontested		
Independent win (new seat)				
Independent win (new seat)				
Independent win (new seat)				
Labour win (new seat)				
Independent win (new seat)				
Independent win (new seat)				
Independent win (new seat)				

== By-elections between 1937 and 1938 ==
By-elections were held in every ward on 4 December 1937 to fill the vacancies created by the Aldermanic election.

Dunham By-election 4 December 1937
Party	Candidate	Votes	%	±%
Labour	W. H. E. Anderson	423	52.7	N/A
Independent	E. T. Lockett	379	47.3	N/A
Majority		44	5.5	
Turnout		802		
Labour gain from Independent		Swing		

East Central By-election 4 December 1937
Party	Candidate	Votes	%	±%
Independent	T. Clayton	uncontested		
Independent hold		Swing		

North By-election 4 December 1937
Party	Candidate	Votes	%	±%
Labour	H. Keay	472	55.7	N/A
Independent	W. H. Lill	222	26.2	N/A
Independent	G. H. Wood	152	18.0	N/A
Majority		250	29.6	
Turnout		846		
Labour hold		Swing		

South West By-election 4 December 1937
Party	Candidate	Votes	%	±%
Independent	H. Bailey	868	84.2	
Labour	G. Cook	163	15.8	
Majority		705	68.4	
Turnout		1,031		
Independent hold		Swing		

Timperley (1) By-election 4 December 1937
Party	Candidate	Votes	%	±%
Independent	S. Dwyer	504	54.3	
Labour	F. B. Meadowcroft	425	45.7	
Majority		79	8.5	
Turnout		929		
Independent hold		Swing		

Timperley (2) By-election 4 December 1937
Party	Candidate	Votes	%	±%
Independent	J. H. Lingard	621	74.1	
Labour	A. Peacock	217	25.9	
Majority		404	48.2	
Turnout		838		
Independent hold		Swing		

Timperley (3) By-election 4 December 1937
Party	Candidate	Votes	%	±%
Independent	W. Bradley Jones	uncontested		
Independent hold		Swing		
