= 1955 Altrincham Municipal Borough Council election =

1955 UK local government election

- 12 May 1955

8 of 32 seats to Altrincham Municipal Borough Council 16 seats needed for a majority
	First party	Second party	Third party
Party	Conservative	Independent	Labour
Last election	6 seats, 52.9%	2 seats, 8.3%	2 seats, 39.1%
Seats before	18	8	6
Seats won	6	0	2
Seats after	18	8	6
Seat change	Steady	Steady	Steady
Popular vote	5,429	0	2,442
Percentage	62.3%	0.0%	28.0%
Swing	▲19.0%	▼8.3%	▼11.1%
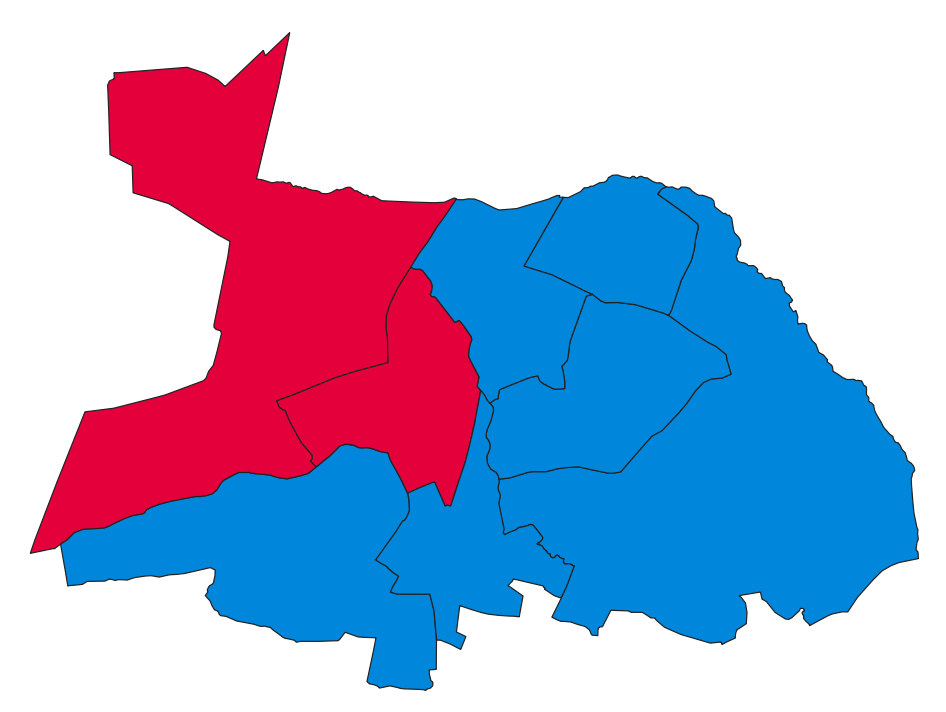
- Map of results of 1955 election
Leader of the Council before election
Conservative
Leader of the Council after election
Conservative

Elections to Altrincham Council were held on Thursday, 12 May 1955. One third of the councillors were up for election, with each successful candidate to serve a three-year term of office. The Conservative Party retained overall control of the council.

== Election result ==
Party	Votes		Seats			Full Council	
Conservative Party	5,429 (62.3%)	▲19.0	6 (75.0%)	6 / 8	Steady	18 (56.3%)	18 / 32
Independent	0 (0.0%)	▼8.3	0 (0.0%)	0 / 8	Steady	8 (25.0%)	8 / 32
Labour Party	2,442 (28.0%)	▼11.1	2 (25.0%)	2 / 8	Steady	6 (18.8%)	6 / 32
Liberal Party	845 (9.7%)	▲0.4	0 (0.0%)	0 / 8	Steady	0 (0.0%)	0 / 32

=== Full council ===
↓
6	8	18

=== Aldermen ===
↓
5	3

=== Councillors ===
↓
6	3	15

== Ward results ==
=== Dunham ===
Dunham
Party	Candidate	Votes	%	±%
Labour	G. Hoyle	uncontested		
Labour hold		Swing		

=== East Central ===
East Central
Party	Candidate	Votes	%	±%
Conservative	A. R. Littler*	975	66.5	N/A
Labour	K. S. Robinson	491	33.5	−13.3
Majority		484	33.0	
Turnout		1,466		
Conservative hold		Swing		

=== North ===
North
Party	Candidate	Votes	%	±%
Labour	G. Harmer*	964	50.5	−3.5
Conservative	R. F. Legat	945	49.5	+3.5
Majority		19	1.0	−7.0
Turnout		1,909		
Labour hold		Swing		

=== South West ===
South West
Party	Candidate	Votes	%	±%
Conservative	C. J. Jones*	uncontested		
Conservative hold		Swing		

=== Timperley (1) ===
Timperley (1)
Party	Candidate	Votes	%	±%
Conservative	J. L. Baxendale*	uncontested		
Conservative hold		Swing		

=== Timperley (2) ===
Timperley (2)
Party	Candidate	Votes	%	±%
Conservative	G. J. Endacott*	918	52.1	−3.2
Liberal	P. Franklin	845	47.9	+3.2
Majority		73	4.2	−6.4
Turnout		1,763		
Conservative hold		Swing		

=== Timperley (3) ===
Timperley (3)
Party	Candidate	Votes	%	±%
Conservative	G. A. Haigh*	uncontested		
Conservative hold		Swing		

=== Timperley (4) ===
Timperley (4)
Party	Candidate	Votes	%	±%
Conservative	A. Melvin Turner*	1,691	63.1	N/A
Labour	N. S. Smith	987	36.9	N/A
Majority		704	26.3	
Turnout		2,678		
Conservative hold		Swing		
