= 1966 Altrincham Municipal Borough Council election =

Local election in Cheshire, England

← 1965	12 May 1966	1967 →

8 of 32 seats to Altrincham Municipal Borough Council 16 seats needed for a majority
	First party	Second party	Third party
Party	Conservative	Labour	Liberal
Last election	6 seats, 48.6%	2 seats, 24.6%	1 seats, 26.8%
Seats before	16	10	4
Seats won	4	3	1
Seats after	17	10	3
Seat change	▲1	Steady	▼1
Popular vote	4,323	4,318	2,391
Percentage	37.7%	37.6%	20.8%
Swing	▼10.9%	▲13.0%	▼6.0%
	Fourth party
Party	Independent
Last election	0 seats, 0.0%
Seats before	3
Seats won	0
Seats after	2
Seat change	Steady
Popular vote	351
Percentage	3.1%
Swing	▲3.1%
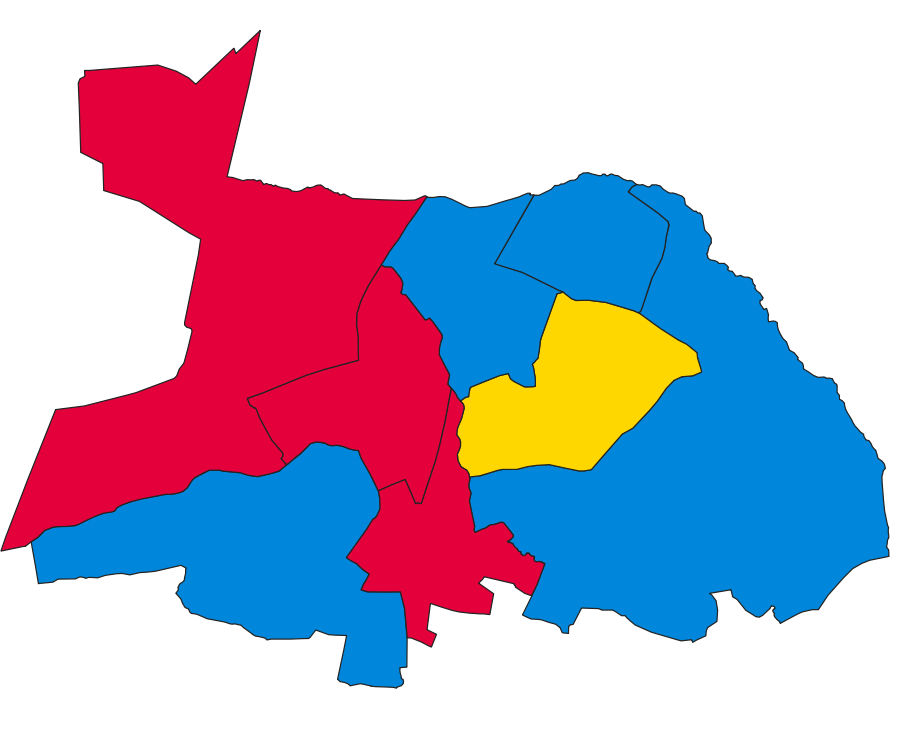
- Map of results of 1966 election
Leader of the Council before election
Conservative
Leader of the Council after election
Conservative

Elections to Altrincham Council were held on Thursday, 12 May 1966. One third of the councillors were up for election, with each successful candidate to serve a three-year term of office. The Conservative Party retained overall control of the council.

== Election result ==
Party	Votes		Seats			Full Council	
Conservative Party	4,323 (37.7%)	▼10.9	4 (50.0%)	4 / 8	▲2	17 (53.1%)	17 / 32
Labour Party	4,318 (37.6%)	▲13.0	3 (37.5%)	3 / 8	Steady	10 (31.6%)	10 / 32
Liberal Party	2,391 (20.8%)	▼6.0	1 (12.5%)	1 / 8	▼1	3 (9.4%)	3 / 32
Independent	351 (3.1%)	▲3.1	0 (0.0%)	0 / 8	Steady	2 (6.3%)	2 / 32
Communist Party	98 (0.9%)	▲0.9	0 (0.0%)	0 / 8	Steady	0 (0.0%)	0 / 32

=== Full council ===
↓
10	3	2	17

=== Aldermen ===
↓
1	2	5

=== Councillors ===
↓
9	3	12

== Ward results ==
=== Dunham ===
Dunham
Party	Candidate	Votes	%	±%
Labour	W. Yates*	728	88.1	N/A
Communist	B. Rothman	98	11.9	N/A
Majority		630	76.2	
Turnout		826		
Labour hold		Swing		

=== East Central ===
East Central
Party	Candidate	Votes	%	±%
Labour	C. Livingstone*	491	58.3	+20.2
Independent	K. Jagger	351	41.7	N/A
Majority		140	16.6	
Turnout		842		
Labour hold		Swing		

=== North ===
North
Party	Candidate	Votes	%	±%
Labour	R. Street*	679	59.2	+14.1
Liberal	S. Hughes	468	40.8	+16.1
Majority		211	18.5	+3.5
Turnout		1,147		
Labour hold		Swing		

=== South West ===
South West
Party	Candidate	Votes	%	±%
Conservative	J. B. Dunn*	743	88.6	+24.0
Labour	R. Wilman	96	11.4	N/A
Majority		647	77.2	+24.4
Turnout		839		
Conservative hold		Swing		

=== Timperley (1) ===
Timperley (1)
Party	Candidate	Votes	%	±%
Conservative	M. Gordon	774	48.0	+0.5
Liberal	N. Schofield*	458	28.4	−0.2
Labour	D. Gill	381	23.6	−0.3
Majority		316	19.6	+0.7
Turnout		1,613		
Conservative gain from Liberal		Swing		

=== Timperley (2) ===
Timperley (2)
Party	Candidate	Votes	%	±%
Conservative	J. Somerset*	700	38.5	
Labour	C. R. Tyrie	575	31.6	
Liberal	P. Franklin	544	29.9	
Majority		125	6.9	
Turnout		1,819		
Conservative hold		Swing		

=== Timperley (3) ===
Timperley (3)
Party	Candidate	Votes	%	±%
Liberal	S. Williamson*	921	47.9	−6.0
Conservative	M. Duffield	742	38.6	−7.5
Labour	G. Potts	259	13.5	N/A
Majority		179	9.3	+1.5
Turnout		1,922		
Liberal hold		Swing		

=== Timperley (4) ===
Timperley (4)
Party	Candidate	Votes	%	±%
Conservative	R. Lydiatt	1,364	55.2	+5.7
Labour	R. E. Singer	1,109	44.8	+6.2
Majority		255	10.4	−0.5
Turnout		2,437		
Conservative hold		Swing		
