= 1969 Altrincham Municipal Borough Council election =

Local election in Cheshire, England

← 1968	8 May 1969	1970 →

9 of 32 seats to Altrincham Municipal Borough Council 16 seats needed for a majority
	First party	Second party	Third party
Party	Conservative	Labour	Liberal
Last election	6 seats, 57.8%	1 seats, 19.5%	1 seats, 18.7%
Seats before	20	7	3
Seats won	8	0	1
Seats after	23	4	3
Seat change	▲3	▼3	Steady
Popular vote	7,689	2,723	2,351
Percentage	58.7%	20.8%	17.9%
Swing	▲1.0%	▲1.3%	▼0.8%
	Fourth party
Party	Independent
Last election	0 seats, 1.6%
Seats before	2
Seats won	0
Seats after	2
Seat change	Steady
Popular vote	0
Percentage	0.0%
Swing	▼1.6
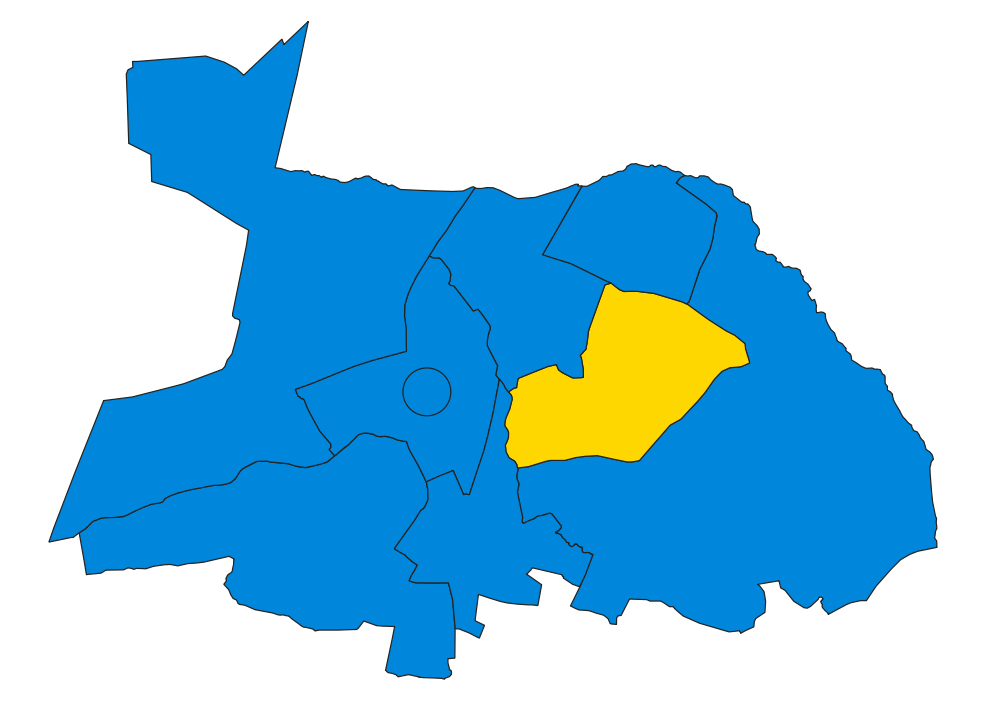
- Map of results of 1969 election
Leader of the Council before election
Conservative
Leader of the Council after election
Conservative

Elections to Altrincham Council were held on Thursday, 8 May 1969. One third of the councillors were up for election, with each successful candidate to serve a three-year term of office. The Conservative Party retained overall control of the council.

== Election result ==
Party	Votes		Seats			Full Council	
Conservative Party	7,689 (58.7%)	▲1.0	8 (88.9%)	8 / 9	▲3	23 (71.9%)	23 / 32
Labour Party	2,723 (20.8%)	▼1.3	0 (0.0%)	0 / 9	▼3	4 (12.5%)	4 / 32
Liberal Party	2,351 (17.9%)	▼0.8	1 (11.1%)	1 / 9	Steady	3 (9.4%)	3 / 32
Independent	0 (0.0%)	▼1.6	0 (0.0%)	0 / 9	Steady	2 (6.3%)	2 / 32
Communist Party	342 (2.6%)	▼0.1	0 (0.0%)	0 / 9	Steady	0 (0.0%)	0 / 32

=== Full council ===
↓
4	3	2	23

=== Aldermen ===
↓
2	2	4

=== Councillors ===
↓
2	3	19

== Ward results ==
=== Dunham ===
Dunham
Party	Candidate	Votes	%	±%
Conservative	N. Spratt	714	57.3	N/A
Labour	W. Yates*	383	30.7	−54.8
Communist	B. Rothman	149	12.0	−2.5
Majority		331	26.6	
Turnout		1,246		
Conservative gain from Labour		Swing		

=== East Central ===
East Central
Party	Candidate	Votes	%	±%
Conservative	F. J. Cable	610	57.6	−6.1
Labour	C. Livingstone*	449	42.4	+6.1
Majority		161	15.2	−12.2
Turnout		1,059		
Conservative gain from Labour		Swing		

=== North ===
North (2 vacancies)
Party	Candidate	Votes	%	±%
Conservative	O. Wilson	939	31.3	
Conservative	F. Dodson	816	27.2	
Labour	W. J. Webb	560	18.7	
Labour	C. R. Tyrie	491	16.4	
Communist	E. Sheldon	193	6.4	
Majority		256	8.5	
Turnout		2,999		
Conservative gain from Labour		Swing		
Conservative hold		Swing		

=== South West ===
South West
Party	Candidate	Votes	%	±%
Conservative	J. B. Dunn*	uncontested		
Conservative hold		Swing		

=== Timperley (1) ===
Timperley (1)
Party	Candidate	Votes	%	±%
Conservative	M. Gordon*	1,142	75.8	+12.1
Liberal	S. Hughes	364	24.2	−12.1
Majority		778	51.6	+24.2
Turnout		1,506		
Conservative hold		Swing		

=== Timperley (2) ===
Timperley (2)
Party	Candidate	Votes	%	±%
Conservative	J. Somerset*	893	50.6	−17.3
Liberal	J. W. Davenport	695	39.4	+7.3
Labour	R. E. Slager	177	10.0	N/A
Majority		198	11.2	−24.6
Turnout		1,765		
Conservative hold		Swing		

=== Timperley (3) ===
Timperley (3)
Party	Candidate	Votes	%	±%
Liberal	S. Williamson*	1,292	63.3	+5.4
Conservative	H. Scholar	750	36.7	−5.4
Majority		542	26.6	+10.8
Turnout		2,042		
Liberal hold		Swing		

=== Timperley (4) ===
Timperley (4)
Party	Candidate	Votes	%	±%
Conservative	R. Lydiatt*	1,824	73.3	+0.2
Labour	V. Collett	663	26.7	−0.2
Majority		1,161	46.6	+0.4
Turnout		2,487		
Conservative hold		Swing		

== By-elections between 1969 and 1970 ==
Timperley (4) By-election 5 June 1969
Party	Candidate	Votes	%	±%
Conservative	A. Weedall	1,019	68.5	−4.8
Labour	V. Collett	468	31.5	+4.8
Majority		551	37.0	−9.6
Turnout		1,487		
Conservative hold		Swing		
