= 1961 Altrincham Municipal Borough Council election =

Local election in Cheshire, England

← 1960	11 May 1961	1962 →

8 of 32 seats to Altrincham Municipal Borough Council 16 seats needed for a majority
	First party	Second party	Third party
Party	Conservative	Labour	Liberal
Last election	6 seats, 51.0%	2 seats, 22.9%	1 seats, 21.7%
Seats before	17	8	3
Seats won	2	3	3
Seats after	15	8	5
Seat change	▼2	Steady	▲2
Popular vote	5,201	3,388	4,542
Percentage	39.6%	25.8%	34.6%
Swing	▼11.4%	▲2.9%	▲12.9
	Fourth party
Party	Independent
Last election	0 seats, 4.4%
Seats before	4
Seats won	0
Seats after	4
Seat change	Steady
Popular vote	0
Percentage	0.0%
Swing	▼4.4%
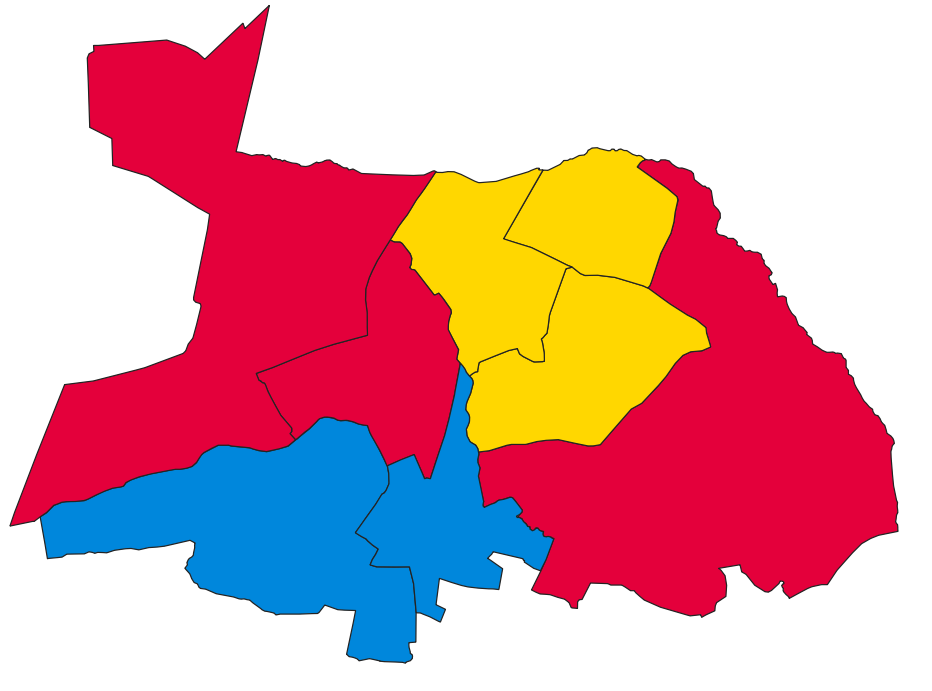
- Map of results of 1961 election
Leader of the Council before election
Conservative
Leader of the Council after election
No overall control

Elections to Altrincham Council of Cheshire, England were held on Thursday, 11 May 1961. One third of the councillors were up for election, with each successful candidate to serve a three-year term of office. The Conservative Party lost overall control of the council.

== Election result ==
Party	Votes		Seats			Full Council	
Conservative Party	5,201 (39.6%)	▼11.4	2 (25.0%)	2 / 8	▼2	15 (46.9%)	15 / 32
Labour Party	3,388 (25.8%)	▲2.9	2 (37.5%)	3 / 8	Steady	8 (25.0%)	8 / 32
Liberal Party	4,542 (34.6%)	▲12.9	3 (37.5%)	3 / 8	▲2	5 (15.6%)	5 / 32
Independent	0 (0.0%)	▼4.4	0 (0.0%)	0 / 8	Steady	4 (12.5%)	4 / 32

=== Full council ===
↓
8	5	4	15

=== Aldermen ===
↓
4	4

=== Councillors ===
↓
8	5	11

== Ward results ==
=== Dunham ===
Dunham
Party	Candidate	Votes	%	±%
Labour	G. Hoyle*	uncontested		
Labour hold		Swing		

=== East Central ===
East Central
Party	Candidate	Votes	%	±%
Conservative	A. R. Littler*	730	52.8	−7.7
Labour	A. Quinn	654	47.2	N/A
Majority		76	5.5	−15.5
Turnout		1,384		
Conservative hold		Swing		

=== North ===
North
Party	Candidate	Votes	%	±%
Labour	G. Harmer*	780	41.5	−12.4
Conservative	P. Oliver	639	34.0	−12.1
Liberal	F. Valentine	461	24.5	N/A
Majority		141	7.5	
Turnout		1,880		
Labour hold		Swing		

=== South West ===
South West
Party	Candidate	Votes	%	±%
Conservative	C. J. Jones*	uncontested		
Conservative hold		Swing		

=== Timperley (1) ===
Timperley (1)
Party	Candidate	Votes	%	±%
Liberal	F. Aldhouse	1,022	51.2	−4.6
Conservative	L. W. Adkin	748	37.5	−6.7
Labour	W. Smith	225	11.3	N/A
Majority		274	13.7	+2.0
Turnout		1,995		
Liberal gain from Conservative		Swing		

=== Timperley (2) ===
Timperley (2)
Party	Candidate	Votes	%	±%
Liberal	W. H. Cawdron*	983	49.2	+15.7
Conservative	R. P. Spragg	739	37.0	−14.7
Labour	B. Mines	277	13.8	−1.0
Majority		244	12.2	
Turnout		1,999		
Liberal hold		Swing		

=== Timperley (3) ===
Timperley (3)
Party	Candidate	Votes	%	±%
Liberal	D. Harper	1,280	58.2	+8.3
Conservative	H. N. Jackson	919	41.8	−8.3
Majority		361	16.4	
Turnout		2,199		
Liberal gain from Conservative		Swing		

=== Timperley (4) ===
Timperley (4)
Party	Candidate	Votes	%	±%
Labour	H. Wharton*	1,452	39.5	
Conservative	R. Hall	1,426	38.8	
Liberal	A. Wright	796	21.7	
Majority		26	0.7	
Turnout		3,674		
Labour hold		Swing		
