= 1962 Altrincham Municipal Borough Council election =

Local election in Cheshire, England

| ← 1961 | 10 May 1962 | 1963 → |

10 of 32 seats to Altrincham Municipal Borough Council 16 seats needed for a majority
| | First party | Second party | Third party |
|---|---|---|---|
| Party | Conservative | Labour | Liberal |
| Last election | 2 seats, 39.6% | 3 seats, 25.8% | 3 seats, 34.6% |
| Seats before | 16 | 8 | 5 |
| Seats won | 2 | 4 | 4 |
| Seats after | 12 | 9 | 8 |
| Seat change | ▼4 | ▲1 | ▲3 |
| Popular vote | 6,478 | 2,959 | 6,357 |
| Percentage | 41.0% | 18.7% | 40.2% |
| Swing | ▲1.4% | ▼7.1% | ▲5.6% |
| | Fourth party |
| Party | Independent |
| Last election | 0 seats, 0.0% |
| Seats before | 3 |
| Seats won | 0 |
| Seats after | 3 |
| Seat change | Steady |
| Popular vote | 0 |
| Percentage | 0.0% |
| Swing | Steady |
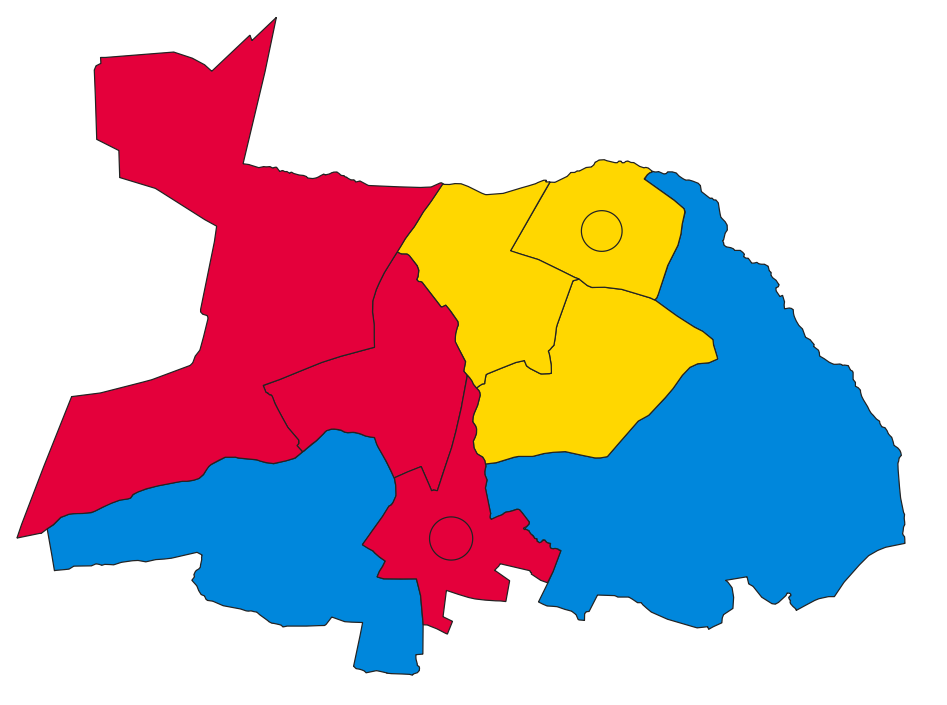
- Map of results of 1962 election
Leader of the Council before election
No overall control
Leader of the Council after election
No overall control

Elections to Altrincham Council were held on Thursday, 10 May 1962. One third of the councillors were up for election, with each successful candidate to serve a three-year term of office. The council remained under no overall control.

== Election result ==
| Party | Votes | | Seats | | | Full Council | |
| Conservative Party | 6,478 (41.0%) | ▲1.4 | 2 (20.0%) | 2 / 10 | ▼4 | 12 (37.5%) | 12 / 32 |
| Labour Party | 2,959 (18.7%) | ▼7.1 | 4 (40.0%) | 4 / 10 | ▲1 | 9 (28.1%) | 9 / 32 |
| Liberal Party | 6,357 (40.2%) | ▲5.6 | 4 (40.0%) | 4 / 10 | ▲3 | 8 (25.0%) | 8 / 32 |
| Independent | 0 (0.0%) | Steady | 0 (0.0%) | 0 / 10 | Steady | 3 (9.4%) | 3 / 32 |

=== Full council ===
↓
| 9 | 8 | 3 | 12 |

=== Aldermen ===
↓
| 3 | 5 |

=== Councillors ===
↓
| 9 | 8 | 7 |

== Ward results ==
=== Dunham ===
Dunham
| Party | Candidate | Votes | % | ±% |
|---|---|---|---|---|
| Labour | E. M. Hoyle* | uncontested | | |
| Labour hold | | Swing | | |

=== East Central ===
East Central (2 vacancies)
| Party | Candidate | Votes | % | ±% |
|---|---|---|---|---|
| Labour | W. J. Webb* | 768 | 57.1 | +9.9 |
| Labour | B. Mines | 697 | 51.8 | +4.6 |
| Conservative | H. N. Jackson | 638 | 47.4 | −5.4 |
| Conservative | F. Megson | 586 | 43.6 | −9.2 |
| Majority | | 59 | 4.4 | |
| Turnout | | 1,345 | 44.0 | |
| Labour hold | | Swing | | |
| Labour gain from Conservative | | Swing | | |

=== North ===
North
| Party | Candidate | Votes | % | ±% |
|---|---|---|---|---|
| Labour | L. M. Smith* | uncontested | | |
| Labour hold | | Swing | | |

=== South West ===
South West
| Party | Candidate | Votes | % | ±% |
|---|---|---|---|---|
| Conservative | D. Willeringhouse* | 701 | 53.4 | N/A |
| Liberal | B. L. Preston | 612 | 46.6 | N/A |
| Majority | | 89 | 6.8 | |
| Turnout | | 1,313 | 39.4 | |
| Conservative hold | | Swing | | |

=== Timperley (1) ===
Timperley (1)
| Party | Candidate | Votes | % | ±% |
|---|---|---|---|---|
| Liberal | M. Prickett* | 1,161 | 64.5 | +13.2 |
| Conservative | F. R. Metcalf | 638 | 35.5 | −2.0 |
| Majority | | 523 | 29.0 | +15.3 |
| Turnout | | 1,799 | 57.5 | |
| Liberal hold | | Swing | | |

=== Timperley (2) ===
Timperley (2) (2 vacancies)
| Party | Candidate | Votes | % | ±% |
|---|---|---|---|---|
| Liberal | P. Franklin | 1,072 | 52.4 | +3.2 |
| Liberal | K. Gardner | 974 | 47.6 | −1.4 |
| Conservative | J. G. Partridge* | 806 | 39.4 | +2.4 |
| Conservative | R. P. Spragg | 790 | 38.6 | +1.6 |
| Labour | A. Peacock | 243 | 11.9 | −1.9 |
| Labour | P. Hawkswood | 204 | 10.0 | −3.8 |
| Majority | | 168 | 8.2 | −4.0 |
| Turnout | | 2,045 | 65.2 | |
| Liberal gain from Conservative | | Swing | | |
| Liberal gain from Conservative | | Swing | | |

=== Timperley (3) ===
Timperley (3)
| Party | Candidate | Votes | % | ±% |
|---|---|---|---|---|
| Liberal | M. W. F. Hiett | 1,236 | 57.1 | −1.1 |
| Conservative | I. M. MacLennan* | 929 | 42.9 | +1.1 |
| Majority | | 307 | 14.2 | −2.2 |
| Turnout | | 2,165 | 64.0 | |
| Liberal gain from Conservative | | Swing | | |

=== Timperley (4) ===
Timperley (4)
| Party | Candidate | Votes | % | ±% |
|---|---|---|---|---|
| Conservative | R. Hall | 1,390 | 37.2 | −1.6 |
| Liberal | A. Wright | 1,302 | 34.8 | +13.1 |
| Labour | W. Oliver | 1,047 | 31.7 | +10.0 |
| Majority | | 88 | 2.4 | |
| Turnout | | 3,739 | 59.8 | |
| Conservative hold | | Swing | | |
