= 1954 Altrincham Municipal Borough Council election =

1954 English local government election

- 13 May 1954

8 of 32 seats to Altrincham Municipal Borough Council 16 seats needed for a majority
	First party	Second party	Third party
Party	Conservative	Independent	Labour
Last election	6 seats, 60.3%	0 seats, 0.0%	2 seats, 39.7%
Seats before	18	8	6
Seats won	4	2	2
Seats after	18	8	6
Seat change	Steady	Steady	Steady
Popular vote	3,520	672	3,177
Percentage	43.3%	8.3%	39.1%
Swing	▼17.0%	▲8.3%	▼0.6%
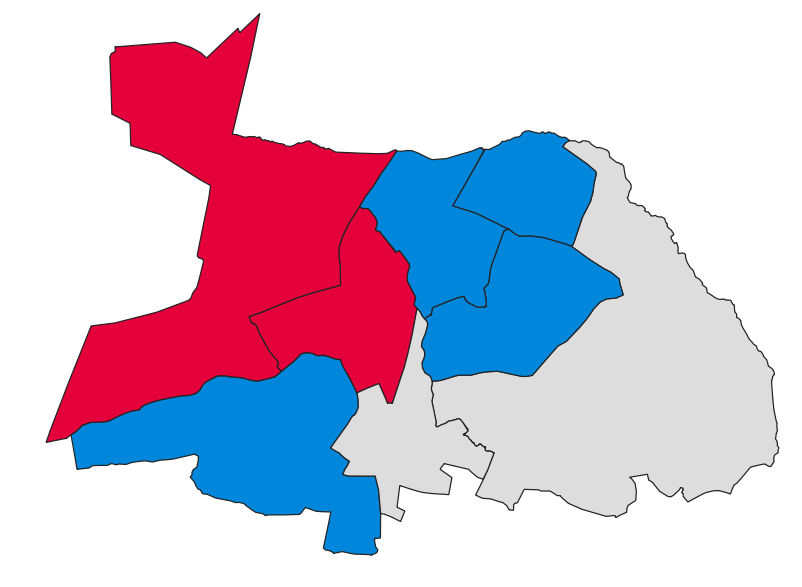
- Map of results of 1954 election
Leader of the Council before election
Conservative
Leader of the Council after election
Conservative

Elections to Altrincham Council were held on Thursday, 13 May 1954. One third of the councillors were up for election, with each successful candidate to serve a three-year term of office. The Conservative Party retained overall control of the council.

== Election result ==
Party	Votes		Seats			Full Council	
Conservative Party	3,520 (43.3%)	▼17.0	4 (50.0%)	4 / 8	Steady	18 (56.3%)	18 / 32
Independent	672 (8.3%)	▲8.3	2 (25.0%)	2 / 8	Steady	8 (25.0%)	8 / 32
Labour Party	3,177 (39.1%)	▼0.6	2 (25.0%)	2 / 8	Steady	6 (18.8%)	6 / 32
Liberal Party	756 (9.3%)	N/A	0 (0.0%)	0 / 8	N/A	0 (0.0%)	0 / 32

=== Full council ===
↓
6	8	18

=== Aldermen ===
↓
5	3

=== Councillors ===
↓
6	3	15

== Ward results ==
=== Dunham ===
Dunham
Party	Candidate	Votes	%	±%
Labour	W. Yates	1,070	61.4	N/A
Conservative	R. F. Legat	672	38.6	N/A
Majority		398	22.8	
Turnout		1,742		
Labour hold		Swing		

=== East Central ===
East Central
Party	Candidate	Votes	%	±%
Independent	J. W. Yarwood*	672	53.2	N/A
Labour	S. G. Marshall	592	46.8	+9.7
Majority		80	6.4	
Turnout		1,264		
Independent hold		Swing		

=== North ===
North
Party	Candidate	Votes	%	±%
Labour	R. Street*	1,023	54.0	−1.0
Conservative	C. W. Thorpe	872	46.0	+1.0
Majority		151	8.0	−2.0
Turnout		1,895		
Labour hold		Swing		

=== South West ===
South West
Party	Candidate	Votes	%	±%
Conservative	T. C. Lochhead*	uncontested		
Conservative hold		Swing		

=== Timperley (1) ===
Timperley (1)
Party	Candidate	Votes	%	±%
Conservative	R. S. Watson*	1,042	67.9	N/A
Labour	E. M. Harmer	492	32.1	N/A
Majority		550	35.9	
Turnout		1,534		
Conservative hold		Swing		

=== Timperley (2) ===
Timperley (2)
Party	Candidate	Votes	%	±%
Conservative	R. M. Kelsall*	934	55.3	−12.8
Liberal	P. Franklin	756	44.7	N/A
Majority		178	10.6	−25.6
Turnout		1,690		
Conservative hold		Swing		

=== Timperley (3) ===
Timperley (3)
Party	Candidate	Votes	%	±%
Conservative	F. Marsland*	uncontested		
Conservative hold		Swing		

=== Timperley (4) ===
Timperley (4)
Party	Candidate	Votes	%	±%
Independent	F. Gibson*	uncontested		
Independent hold		Swing		
