= 1952 Altrincham Municipal Borough Council election =

Local election in England

- 8 May 1952

8 of 32 seats to Altrincham Municipal Borough Council 16 seats needed for a majority
	First party	Second party	Third party
Party	Conservative	Independent	Labour
Last election	4 seats, 32.2%	2 seats, 34.7%	2 seats, 33.0%
Seats before	20	8	4
Seats won	6	0	2
Seats after	20	7	5
Seat change	Steady	▼1	▲1
Popular vote	5,059	0	3,780
Percentage	52.9%	0.0%	39.5%
Swing	▲20.7%	▼34.7%	▲6.5%
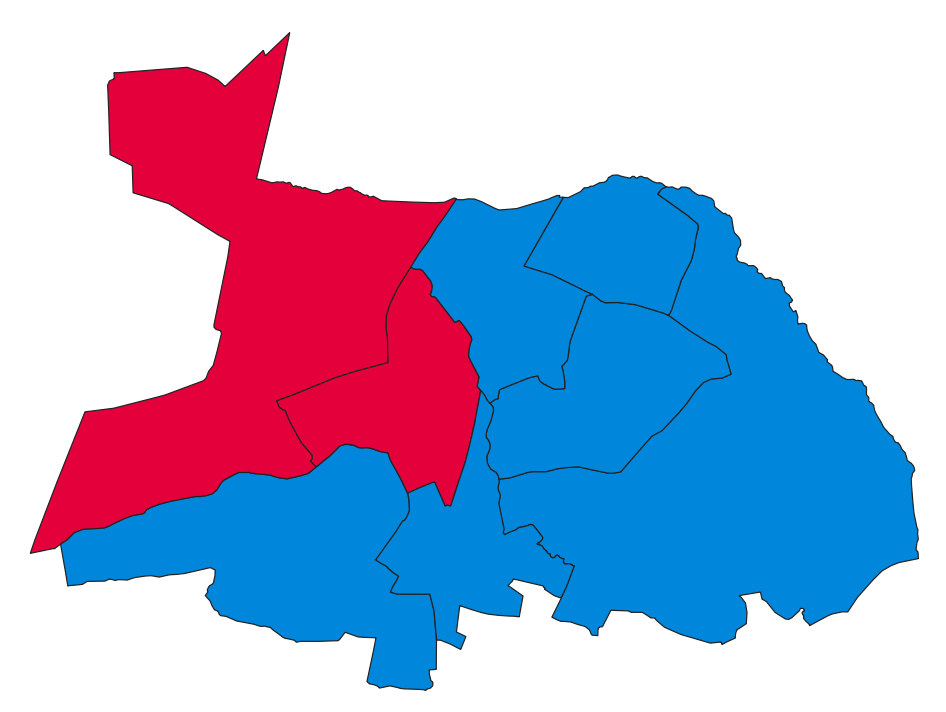
- Map of results of 1952 election
Leader of the Council before election
Conservative
Leader of the Council after election
Conservative

Elections to Altrincham Council were held on Thursday, 8 May 1952. One third of the councillors were up for election, with each successful candidate to serve a three-year term of office. The Conservative Party retained overall control of the council.

== Election result ==
Party	Votes		Seats			Full Council	
Conservative Party	5,059 (52.9%)	▲20.7	6 (75.0%)	6 / 8	Steady	20 (62.5%)	20 / 32
Independent	0 (0.0%)	▼34.7	0 (0.0%)	0 / 8	▼1	7 (21.9%)	7 / 32
Labour Party	3,780 (39.5%)	▲6.5	2 (25.0%)	2 / 8	▲1	5 (15.6%)	5 / 32
Liberal Party	726 (7.6%)	N/A	0 (0.0%)	0 / 8	N/A	0 (0.0%)	0 / 32

=== Full council ===
↓
5	7	20

=== Aldermen ===
↓
5	3

=== Councillors ===
↓
5	2	17

== Ward results ==
=== Dunham ===
Dunham
Party	Candidate	Votes	%	±%
Labour	T. Baxter*	1,295	67.1	+10.0
Conservative	W. E. Bendell	636	42.9	−10.0
Majority		659	34.1	+20.0
Turnout		1,931		
Labour hold		Swing		

=== East Central ===
East Central
Party	Candidate	Votes	%	±%
Conservative	A. R. Littler	1,054	57.9	+10.5
Labour	K. S. Robinson	766	42.1	N/A
Majority		288	15.8	
Turnout		1,820		
Conservative hold		Swing		

=== North ===
North
Party	Candidate	Votes	%	±%
Labour	G. Harmer	1,102	53.7	+2.4
Conservative	A. Fraser	951	46.3	N/A
Majority		151	7.4	+4.7
Turnout		2,053		
Labour gain from Conservative		Swing		

=== South West ===
South West
Party	Candidate	Votes	%	±%
Conservative	E. Ormerod	uncontested		
Conservative hold		Swing		

=== Timperley (1) ===
Timperley (1)
Party	Candidate	Votes	%	±%
Conservative	J. L. Baxendale*	uncontested		
Conservative hold		Swing		

=== Timperley (2) ===
Timperley (2)
Party	Candidate	Votes	%	±%
Conservative	G. J. Endacott	1,282	67.5	N/A
Labour	M. Walsh	617	32.5	N/A
Majority		665	35.0	
Turnout		1,899		
Conservative hold		Swing		

=== Timperley (3) ===
Timperley (3)
Party	Candidate	Votes	%	±%
Conservative	G. A. Haigh*	1,136	61.0	N/A
Liberal	F. Y. Orrell	726	39.0	N/A
Majority		410	22.0	
Turnout		1,862		
Conservative hold		Swing		

=== Timperley (4) ===
Timperley (4)
Party	Candidate	Votes	%	±%
Conservative	A. Melvin Turner	uncontested		
Conservative gain from Independent		Swing		
