= 1938 Altrincham Municipal Borough Council election =

Election in Cheshire, England

- 1 November 1938

7 of 28 seats to Altrincham Municipal Borough Council 14 seats needed for a majority
	First party	Second party
Party	Independent	Labour
Last election	17 seats, 89.3%	4 seats, 10.6%
Seats before	22	6
Seats won	5	2
Seats after	22	6
Seat change	Steady	Steady
Popular vote	2,882	2,310
Percentage	55.5%	44.5%
Swing	▼33.8%	▲33.8%
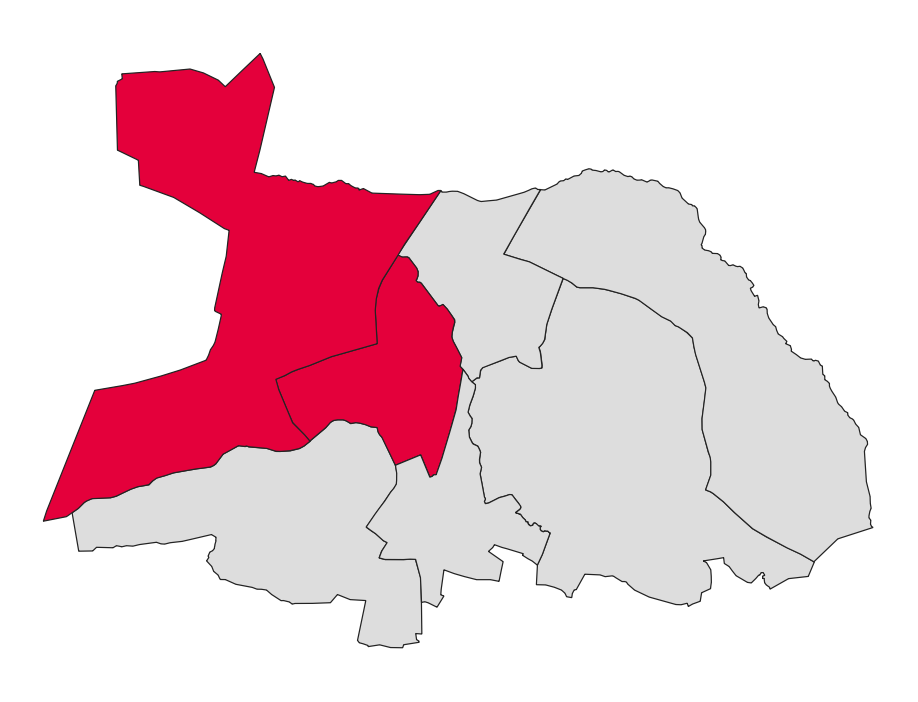
- Map of results of 1938 election
Leader of the Council before election
Independent
Leader of the Council after election
Independent

Elections to Altrincham Council were held on Tuesday, 1 November 1938. One third of the councillors were up for election, with each successful candidate to serve a three-year term of office. Independents retained overall control of the council. These were the last local elections held in Altrincham until after the end of the Second World War.

== Election result ==
Party	Votes		Seats			Full Council	
Independent	2,882 (55.5%)	▼33.8	5 (71.4%)	5 / 7	Steady	22 (78.6%)	22 / 28
Labour Party	2,310 (44.5%)	▲33.8	2 (28.6%)	2 / 7	Steady	6 (21.4%)	6 / 28

=== Full council ===
↓
6	22

=== Aldermen ===
↓
1	6

=== Councillors ===
↓
5	16

== Ward results ==
=== Dunham ===
Dunham
Party	Candidate	Votes	%	±%
Labour	T. C. Handford*	889	64.1	N/A
Independent	B. Freeman	497	35.9	N/A
Majority		392	28.3	
Turnout		1,386		
Labour hold		Swing		

=== East Central ===
East Central
Party	Candidate	Votes	%	±%
Independent	J. S. Pearson*	uncontested		
Independent hold		Swing		

=== North ===
North
Party	Candidate	Votes	%	±%
Labour	T. Farrar*	uncontested		
Labour hold		Swing		

=== South West ===
South West
Party	Candidate	Votes	%	±%
Independent	T. P. Bell Houlden*	uncontested		
Independent hold		Swing		

=== Timperley (1) ===
Timperley (1)
Party	Candidate	Votes	%	±%
Independent	R. S. Watson	541	51.9	
Labour	F. B. Meadowcroft	501	48.1	
Majority		40	3.8	
Turnout		1,042		
Independent hold		Swing		

=== Timperley (2) ===
Timperley (2)
Party	Candidate	Votes	%	±%
Independent	G. C. Aldhouse*	806	67.3	
Labour	A. Peacock	392	32.7	
Majority		414	34.6	
Turnout		1,198		
Independent hold		Swing		

=== Timperley (3) ===
Timperley (3)
Party	Candidate	Votes	%	±%
Independent	G. M. Rourke*	1,038	66.3	
Labour	J. E. Marsden	528	33.7	
Majority		510	32.6	
Turnout		1,566		
Independent hold		Swing		
