= 1957 Altrincham Municipal Borough Council election =

Local election in Cheshire, England

- 9 May 1957

8 of 32 seats to Altrincham Municipal Borough Council 16 seats needed for a majority
	First party	Second party	Third party
Party	Conservative	Labour	Independent
Last election	6 seats, 46.0%	2 seats, 42.4%	0 seats, 4.2%
Seats before	19	6	7
Seats won	5	2	1
Seats after	20	6	6
Seat change	▲1	Steady	▼1
Popular vote	4,254	3,637	843
Percentage	42.0%	35.9%	8.3%
Swing	▼4.0%	▼6.5%	▲4.1%
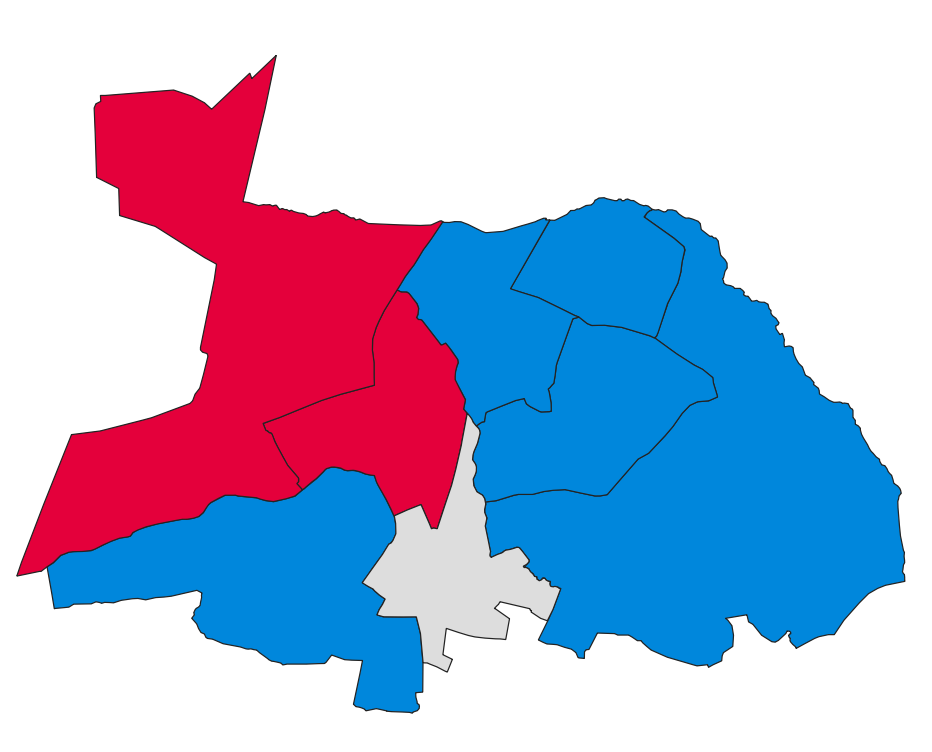
- Map of results of 1957 election
Leader of the Council before election
Conservative
Leader of the Council after election
Conservative

Elections to Altrincham Council were held on Thursday, 9 May 1957. One third of the councillors were up for election, with each successful candidate to serve a three-year term of office. The Conservative Party retained overall control of the council.

== Election result ==
Party	Votes		Seats			Full Council	
Conservative Party	4,254 (42.0%)	▼4.0	5 (62.5%)	5 / 8	▲1	20 (62.5%)	20 / 32
Labour Party	3,637 (35.9%)	▼6.5	2 (25.0%)	2 / 8	Steady	6 (18.8%)	6 / 32
Independent	843 (8.3%)	▲4.1	1 (12.5%)	1 / 8	▼1	6 (18.8%)	6 / 32
Liberal Party	1,406 (13.9%)	▲6.5	0 (0.0%)	0 / 8	Steady	0 (0.0%)	0 / 32

=== Full council ===
↓
6	6	20

=== Aldermen ===
↓
5	3

=== Councillors ===
↓
6	1	17

== Ward results ==
=== Dunham ===
Dunham
Party	Candidate	Votes	%	±%
Labour	W. Yates*	uncontested		
Labour hold		Swing		

=== East Central ===
East Central
Party	Candidate	Votes	%	±%
Independent	B. Byrom	843	52.5	N/A
Labour	W. J. Webb	763	47.5	+3.4
Majority		80	5.0	
Turnout		1,606		
Independent hold		Swing		

=== North ===
North
Party	Candidate	Votes	%	±%
Labour	R. Street*	1,012	56.8	−3.4
Conservative	E. Odlin	771	43.2	+3.4
Majority		241	13.6	−6.8
Turnout		1,783		
Labour hold		Swing		

=== South West ===
South-West
Party	Candidate	Votes	%	±%
Conservative	I. C. Lockhead*	uncontested		
Conservative hold		Swing		

=== Timperley (1) ===
Timperley (1)
Party	Candidate	Votes	%	±%
Conservative	L. W. Adkin	uncontested		
Conservative hold		Swing		

=== Timperley (2) ===
Timperley (2)
Party	Candidate	Votes	%	±%
Conservative	R. M. Kelsall*	908	45.8	−6.3
Liberal	W. H. Cawdron	650	32.8	−15.1
Labour	N. S. South	424	21.4	N/A
Majority		258	13.0	+8.8
Turnout		1,982		
Conservative hold		Swing		

=== Timperley (3) ===
Timperley (3)
Party	Candidate	Votes	%	±%
Conservative	L. Wilson	900	54.3	−13.9
Liberal	D. Dickson	756	45.7	N/A
Majority		144	8.6	−27.8
Turnout		1,656		
Conservative hold		Swing		

=== Timperley (4) ===
Timperley (4)
Party	Candidate	Votes	%	±%
Conservative	A. Leslie	1,675	53.8	−2.7
Labour	R. Tomlinson	1,438	46.2	+2.7
Majority		237	7.6	−6.4
Turnout		3,113		
Conservative gain from Independent		Swing		
