= 1950 Altrincham Municipal Borough Council election =

1950 English local government election

- 11 May 1950

8 of 32 seats to Altrincham Municipal Borough Council 16 seats needed for a majority
	First party	Second party	Third party
Party	Conservative	Independent	Labour
Last election	6 seats, 57.2%	1 seats, 9.2%	1 seats, 31.4%
Seats before	21	9	2
Seats won	7	1	0
Seats after	22	8	2
Seat change	▲1	▼1	Steady
Popular vote	3,189	0	2,037
Percentage	61.0%	0.0%	39.0%
Swing	▲3.8%	▼9.2%	▲7.6%
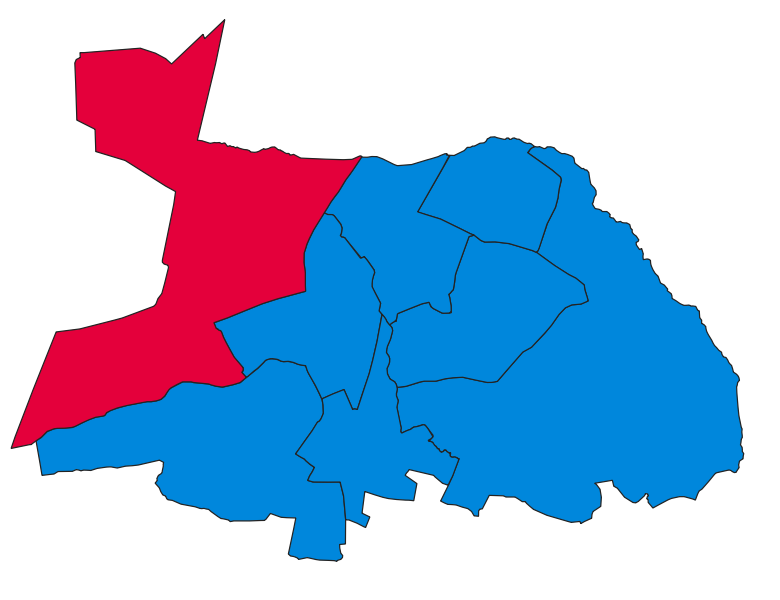
- Map of results of 1950 election
Leader of the Council before election
Conservative
Leader of the Council after election
Conservative

Elections to Altrincham Council were held on Thursday, 11 May 1950. One third of the councillors were up for election, with each successful candidate to serve a three-year term of office. The Conservative Party retained overall control of the council.

== Election result ==
Party	Votes		Seats			Full Council	
Conservative Party	3,189 (61.0%)	▲3.8	7 (87.5%)	7 / 8	▲1	22 (68.8%)	22 / 32
Independent	0 (0.0%)	▼9.2	0 (0.0%)	0 / 8	▼1	8 (25.0%)	8 / 32
Labour Party	2,037 (39.0%)	▲7.6	1 (12.5%)	1 / 8	Steady	2 (6.3%)	2 / 32

=== Full council ===
↓
2	8	22

=== Aldermen ===
↓
5	3

=== Councillors ===
↓
2	3	19

== Ward results ==
=== Dunham ===
Dunham
Party	Candidate	Votes	%	±%
Labour	A. Vesey*	uncontested		
Labour hold		Swing		

=== East Central ===
East Central
Party	Candidate	Votes	%	±%
Conservative	E. H. Chorlton*	1,045	65.6	+1.0
Labour	J. G. Williams	549	34.4	−1.0
Majority		496	31.2	+1.9
Turnout		1,594		
Conservative hold		Swing		

=== North ===
North
Party	Candidate	Votes	%	±%
Conservative	H. Cowsill*	906	52.4	−0.6
Labour	E. Hoyle	822	47.6	+0.6
Majority		84	4.8	−1.2
Turnout		1,728		
Conservative hold		Swing		

=== South West ===
South West
Party	Candidate	Votes	%	±%
Conservative	E. J. Horley*	uncontested		
Conservative hold		Swing		

=== Timperley (1) ===
Timperley (1)
Party	Candidate	Votes	%	±%
Conservative	J. L. Warren*	1,238	65.0	+0.6
Labour	J. Chapman	666	35.0	−0.6
Majority		572	30.0	+1.2
Turnout		1,904		
Conservative hold		Swing		

=== Timperley (2) ===
Timperley (2)
Party	Candidate	Votes	%	±%
Conservative	M. Heath*	uncontested		
Conservative hold		Swing		

=== Timperley (3) ===
Timperley (3)
Party	Candidate	Votes	%	±%
Conservative	I. M. MacLennan	uncontested		
Conservative gain from Independent		Swing		

=== Timperley (4) ===
Timperley (4)
Party	Candidate	Votes	%	±%
Conservative	E. M. Fitton*	uncontested		
Conservative hold		Swing		
