= 1947 Altrincham Municipal Borough Council election =

Local election in England

- 1 November 1947

12 of 32 seats to Altrincham Municipal Borough Council 16 seats needed for a majority
	First party	Second party	Third party
Party	Independent	Conservative	Labour
Last election	7 seats, 53.2%	did not stand	1 seat, 35.8%
Seats before	23	0	5
Seats won	4	8	0
Seats after	20	8	4
Seat change	▼3	▲8	▼1
Popular vote	6,850	11,151	4,873
Percentage	28.4%	46.2%	20.2%
Swing	▼24.8%	▲46.2%	▼15.6%
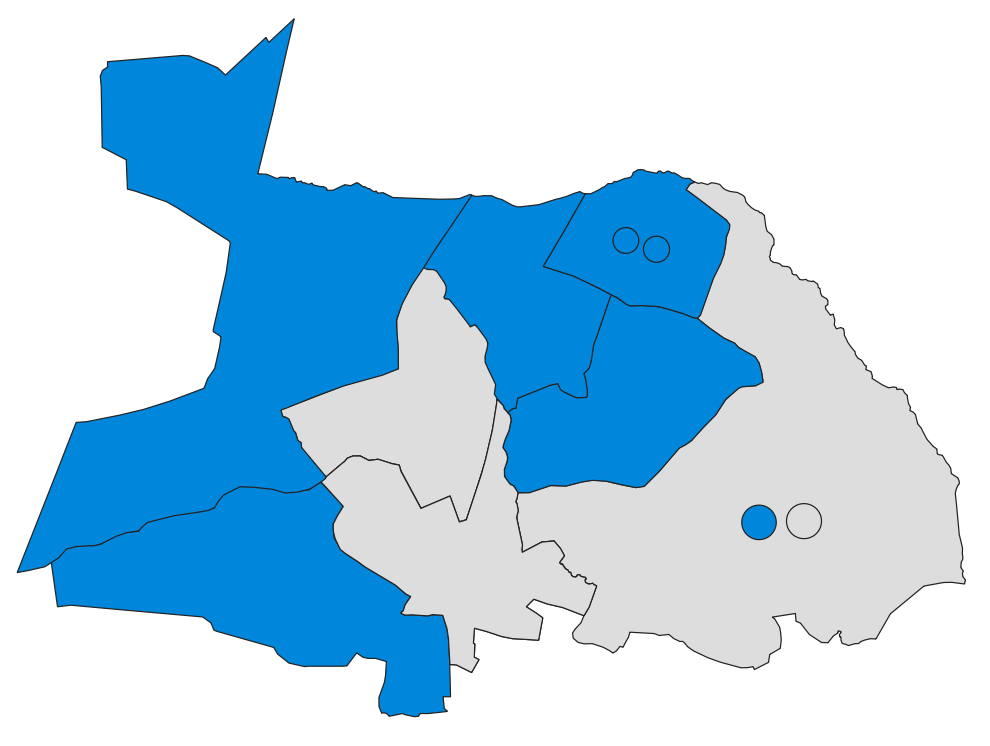
- Map of results of 1947 election
Leader of the Council before election
Independent
Leader of the Council after election
Independent

Elections to Altrincham Council were held on Saturday, 1 November 1947. One third of the councillors were up for election, with each successful candidate to serve a three-year term of office. Due to boundary changes, two wards elected all three of their councillors. It was the first time that the Conservative Party stood candidates for election to Altrincham Council. Independents retained overall control of the council.

== Election result ==
Party	Votes		Seats			Full Council	
Independent	6,850 (28.4%)	▼24.8	4 (33.3%)	4 / 12	▼3	20 (62.5%)	20 / 32
Conservative Party	11,151 (46.2%)	N/A	8 (66.7%)	8 / 12	▲8	8 (25.0%)	8 / 32
Labour Party	4,873 (20.2%)	▼15.6	0 (0.0%)	0 / 12	▼1	4 (12.5%)	4 / 32
Liberal Party	1,270 (5.3%)	▲0.6	0 (0.0%)	0 / 12	Steady	0 (0.0%)	0 / 32

=== Full council ===
↓
4	20	8

=== Aldermen ===
↓
2	6

=== Councillors ===
↓
2	14	8

== Ward results ==
=== Dunham ===
Dunham
Party	Candidate	Votes	%	±%
Conservative	D. J. L. Bryden	1,153	53.4	N/A
Labour	D. Norton	1,008	46.6	−18.2
Majority		145	6.7	
Turnout		2,161		
Conservative gain from Labour		Swing		

=== East Central ===
East Central
Party	Candidate	Votes	%	±%
Independent	J. S. Pearson*	1,533	74.0	−1.0
Labour	J. Cogan	540	26.0	+1.0
Majority		993	48.0	−2.0
Turnout		2,073		
Independent hold		Swing		

=== North ===
North
Party	Candidate	Votes	%	±%
Independent	E. Odlin*	1,393	62.0	+12.1
Labour	H. Keay	853	38.0	−0.3
Majority		540	24.0	+12.5
Turnout		2,246		
Independent gain from Labour		Swing		

=== South West ===
South West
Party	Candidate	Votes	%	±%
Conservative	G. M. Worthington	uncontested		
Conservative gain from Independent		Swing		

=== Timperley (1) ===
Timperley (1)
Party	Candidate	Votes	%	±%
Conservative	R. S. Watson*	1,319	57.7	N/A
Labour	C. Holt	711	31.1	−14.0
Liberal	R. T. A. Prickett	254	11.1	N/A
Majority		608	26.6	
Turnout		2,284		
Conservative gain from Independent		Swing		

=== Timperley (2) ===
Timperley (2)
Party	Candidate	Votes	%	±%
Conservative	R. M. Kelsall	1,529	67.3	
Conservative	M. Heath	1,450	63.8	
Conservative	E. Cashmore	1,320	58.1	
Independent	W. E. Bendell*	868	38.2	
Labour	A. M. Atherton	650	28.6	
Labour	A. Peacock	614	27.0	
Liberal	A. B. Hamer	387	17.0	
Majority		452	19.9	
Turnout		2,273		
Conservative win (new seat)				
Conservative win (new seat)				
Conservative win (new seat)				

=== Timperley (3) ===
Timperley (3)
Party	Candidate	Votes	%	±%
Conservative	F. Marsland	1,250	46.9	N/A
Independent	A. S. Jarratt*	765	28.7	−31.4
Labour	F. Hamer	497	18.6	−21.3
Liberal	A. Hamer	153	5.7	N/A
Majority		485	18.2	
Turnout		2,665		
Conservative gain from Independent		Swing		

=== Timperley (4) ===
Timperley (4)
Party	Candidate	Votes	%	±%
Independent	F. Gibson*	1,178	50.7	
Conservative	E. M. Fitton	1,146	49.3	
Independent	E. Studley*	1,113	47.9	
Conservative	R. H. Lancaster	1,045	45.0	
Conservative	G. B. Jones	937	40.3	
Liberal	P. Fishpool	476	20.5	
Majority		68	2.9	
Turnout		2,323		
Independent win (new seat)				
Conservative win (new seat)				
Independent win (new seat)				
