= The Manchester Rambler =

Song written by the English folk singer Ewan MacColl

"The Manchester Rambler", also known as "I'm a Rambler" and "The Rambler's Song", is a song written by the British folk singer Ewan MacColl in 1932. It was inspired by his participation in the Kinder trespass, a protest by the urban Young Communist League of Manchester, and was the work that began MacColl's career as a singer-songwriter.

Since the 1950s, the song has become a standard among folk musicians, as it was for MacColl himself. It has been covered many times, including by The Dubliners and the Houghton Weavers. It has been sung both in clubs and in the open air on a variety of occasions, including at Kinder Downfall in 2009 when Kinder was designated as a National Nature Reserve.

== Context ==
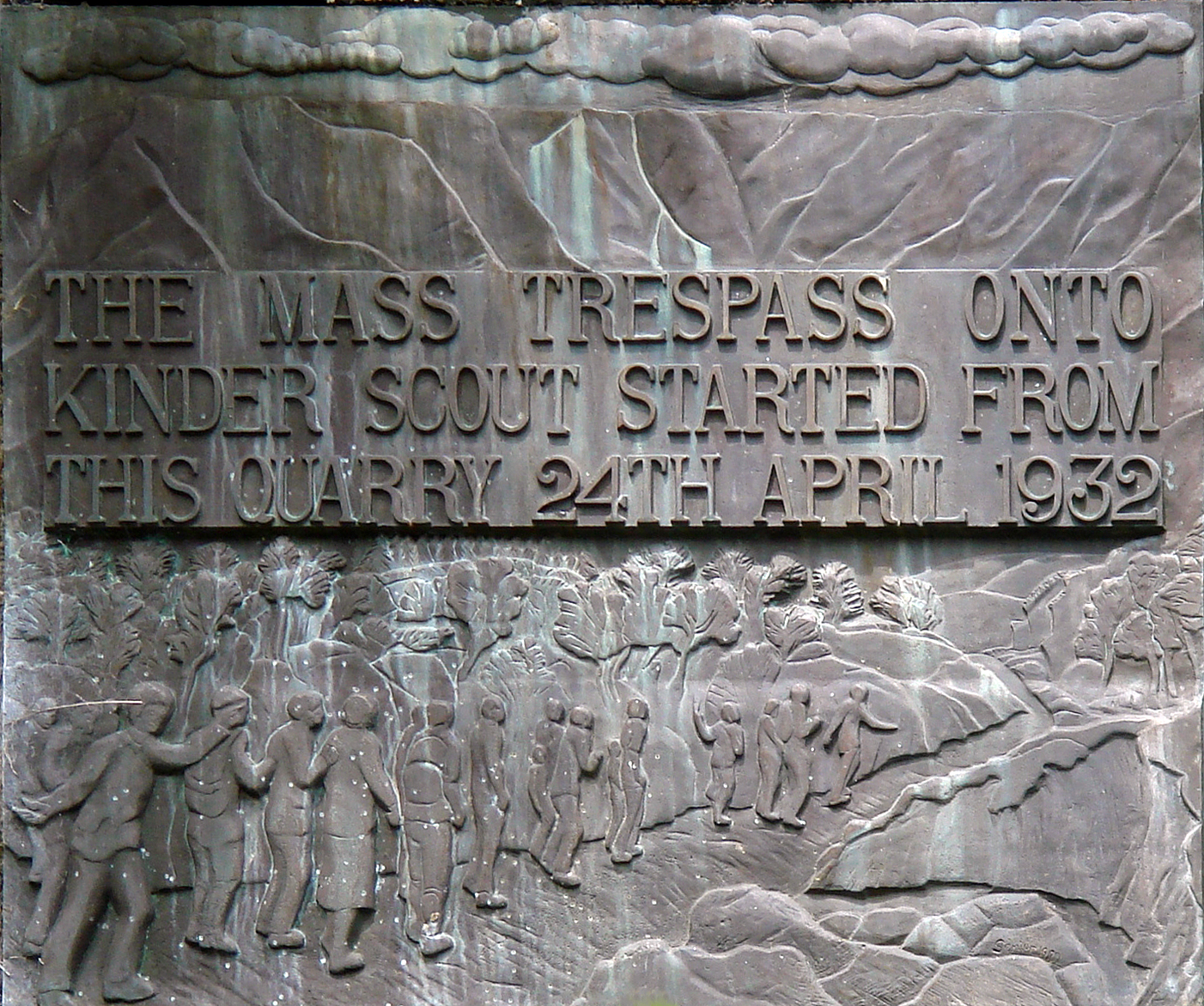
1982 plaque commemorating the 1932 Kinder mass trespass at Bowden Bridge Quarry, near Hayfield, where the walk started

The Kinder mass trespass was a deliberate act of civil disobedience (the law of trespass having already been repealed) by men of the Young Communist League of Manchester, and others from Sheffield. The protest was intended to secure free access to England's mountains and moorlands. The 'ramblers', led by Benny Rothman, walked from Bowden Bridge Quarry, near Hayfield, to climb the hill called Kinder Scout in the Derbyshire Peak District on 24 April 1932. A young man aged 17 called James Henry Miller, better known later as Ewan MacColl, was a keen rambler and an enthusiastic member of the Young Communist League. He played a major part in organising the publicity for the trespass, duplicating and handing out leaflets, though this role is disputed. He took part in the trespass, and was shocked by the violent reaction of the gamekeepers who met the ramblers on the hill, and the extremely harsh sentences handed down by the magistrates to the five ramblers who were arrested that day. What MacColl did not know was that the protest was to have a powerful long-term effect, leading to improved access to the countryside in the shape of national parks (from 1949), long-distance footpaths starting with the Pennine Way (opened in 1965) and various forms of the desired 'right to roam' (such as with the CRoW Act, 2000).

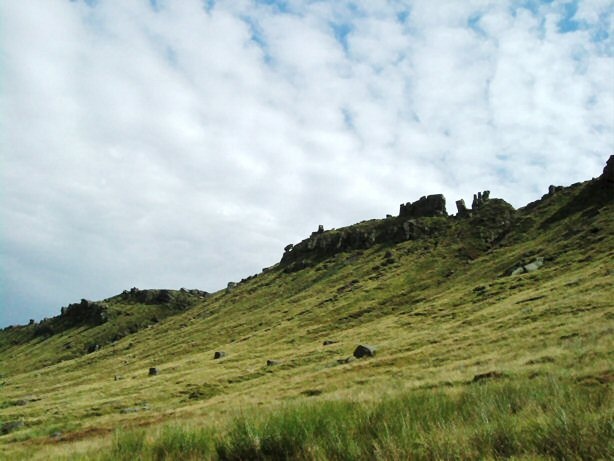
Kinder Scout was part of a private estate in 1932.

In his biographer Ben Harker's view, "It would be difficult to overstate the extent to which MacColl was shaped by the 1930s." MacColl was a keen rambler, travelling out of Manchester by bus into the Peak District, like thousands of other young unemployed people with time on their hands. For MacColl, rambling was integral to his politics; he did not simply find nature beautiful and the urban world ugly: instead, it was an objective of the hoped-for revolution:

to create a world that would harmonize with that other one that you enjoyed so much... If the bourgeoisie had had any sense at all they would never have allowed the working class into that kind of countryside. Because it bred a spirit of revolt.

Groups of ramblers often sang songs such as "I'm Happy When I'm Hiking", as well as bawdy songs, ballads and radical American protest songs at their camps. MacColl published the "Manchester Youth Song" in 1933, singing of "Workers in Cheetham, who slave every day / In waterproof factories at starvation pay". He also wrote the song "Mass Trespass 1932", setting words like "For the mass trespass is the only way there is / To gain access to the mountains once again" to the old Scottish tune of "The Road to the Isles". His friends used to sing it as they rambled in the hills.

== Folk song ==
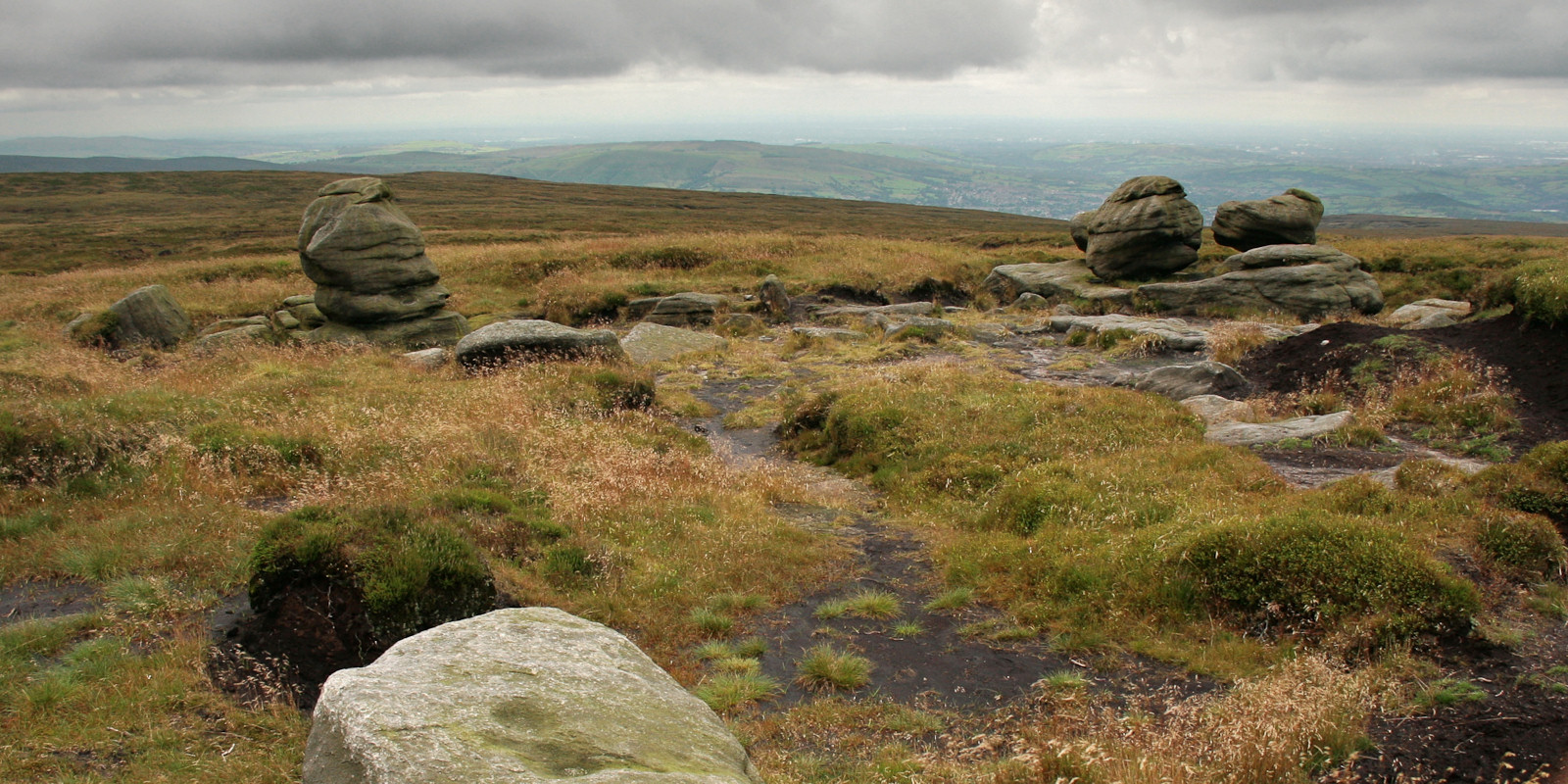
Wain Stones, Bleaklow

"The Manchester Rambler", written in 1932 not long after the Kinder trespass and inspired by that event, was MacColl's first important song, according to Harker, who argues that it "marks a departure from the [singer's] leaden-footed and slogan-heavy juvenilia". It is also the first song that still survives for which he wrote the melody as well as the lyrics. Its swinging, jaunty melody demonstrates MacColl's ability to combine musical forms and popular rhythms to create a song which is at once familiar and unique. Like the melody, the lyrics are witty and playful. They put out a defiant political message with "I may be a wage slave on Monday / But I am a free man on Sunday". MacColl plays with and updates traditional English folksong phraseology with "I once loved a maid, a spot-welder by trade / She was fair as the Rowan in bloom". The lyrics are suitably comical on the confrontation between the ramblers and the gamekeepers in the style of musical theatre, argues Harker, with lines such as "He called me a louse and said 'Think of the grouse'". The song has 5 verses, each of 8 lines, and a 4-line chorus.

The song names the following places: Snowdon (North Wales); Crowden (by the Woodhead Pass road in Derbyshire); the Wainstones (on the Bleaklow plateau in Derbyshire); Kinder Scout; Manchester; Grindsbrook and Upper Tor (both Edale, Derbyshire).

"The Manchester Rambler" is published by Green Linnet on MacColl's 1986 CD Black and White: The Definitive Collection, also released by Cooking Vinyl; the recording lasts 4 minutes 42 seconds, and MacColl is assisted on vocals by his wife, the folk singer Peggy Seeger.

== Reception and influence ==
Ben Harker said of "The Manchester Rambler" that:

Rambler is the song where it all comes together. He'd written these rather earnest agitprop pieces prior to that, but in Rambler, he manages to pull together a political perspective with a more lyrical style... It crystallises his songwriting and that's the first time it happens.

MacColl performed the song as a standard all his life. A recording on his 1983 album Freeborn Man features backing vocals from his second wife, Peggy Seeger, and four of his five children, including the singer Kirsty MacColl; it was later included on Kirsty MacColl's posthumous compilation The One And Only. Cover versions were performed and recorded by dozens of folk musicians from the 1950s onwards, including by The Dubliners on Alive Alive-O and 30 Years A-Greying. while Casey Neill covered it on his eponymous album in 1999. The Houghton Weavers covered it on their 1978 album Sit Thi Deawn, and in 2005 Mick Groves of The Spinners performed it on his album Fellow Journeyman. Patterson Jordan Dipper covered it on their album Flat Earth in 2010, and Danny and Mary O'Leary covered it in 2014.

The Oxford Dictionary of National Biography writes of MacColl that "One of his first and finest protest songs, ‘The Manchester Rambler’, dealt with the ‘mass trespass’ campaigns of the 1930s, in which hikers fought pitched battles with gamekeepers when they invaded privately owned grouse moors." The Encyclopaedia of Contemporary British Culture describes MacColl as "a crucial figure" in the folk revival of the 1950s and 1960s, and names "The Manchester Rambler" as one of his "more famous songs".

The comedian and folk singer Mike Harding, in The Guardian, wrote that:

When I was a young lad walking in the hills for the first time, camping out on the Pots and Pans stone on Saddleworth Moor, getting the last bus back from Hayfield, crawling up Jack's Rake, in Langdale, we sang that song and meant every word of it.

Harding, who was running a Manchester folk club on Sunday nights at that time, said:

on those nights the lobby would be choked with the rucksacks of the people who had just come off the hill and were looking forward to a night of beer and songs... Most nights in the pub we would sing the Manchester Rambler, only too aware that it was people like Rothman and Stephenson who had fought to get the hills opened up for us. We knew that Rothman had gone to jail for walking on Kinder Scout during the mass trespass in 1932.

The song was sung at Kinder Downfall (the waterfall on Kinder Scout) in 2009 when Kinder was designated as a National Nature Reserve (NNR); in attendance were establishment figures including three Members of Parliament, the Chief Executive Officers of three National Parks and the leaders of Natural England. The British Mountaineering Council's booklet issued in 2012 to commemorate 80 years of the Kinder mass trespass reproduced the lyrics of "The Manchester Rambler" in full.

== See also ==
- List of socialist songs
- The Happy Wanderer
- Wandervogel
