= Ewan MacColl =

British folk singer-songwriter and activist (1915–1989)

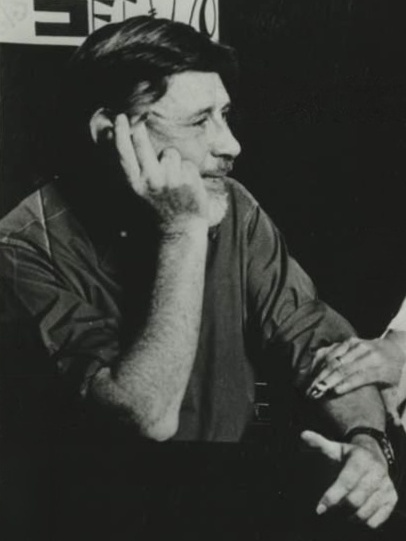
- MacColl c. 1981 – c. 1982
- Born: James Henry Miller; 25 January 1915; Broughton, Lancashire, England
- Died: 22 October 1989 (aged 74); Brompton, London, England
- Occupations: Singer-songwriter; folk song collector; labour activist; actor
- Years active: 1930–1989
- Political party: Communist Party of Great Britain (CPGB)
- Spouses: Joan Littlewood (m. 1934; div. 1949) Jean Newlove (m. 1949; div. 1974) Peggy Seeger (m. 1977)
- Children: 5, including Kirsty MacColl
- Relatives: Pete Seeger (brother-in-law)

James Henry Miller (25 January 1915 – 22 October 1989), better known by his stage name Ewan MacColl, was a British folk singer-songwriter, folk song collector, labour activist and actor. Born in England to Scottish parents, he was one of the originators of the 1960s folk revival and wrote such songs as "The First Time Ever I Saw Your Face" and "Dirty Old Town".

MacColl collected hundreds of traditional folk songs including the version of "Scarborough Fair" later popularised by Simon & Garfunkel, and released dozens of albums with A.L. Lloyd, Peggy Seeger and others, mostly of traditional folk songs. He also wrote many left-wing political songs, remaining a steadfast communist throughout his life and actively engaging in political activism.

== Early life and early career ==
MacColl was born as James Henry Miller at 4 Andrew Street, in Broughton, Salford, England, on 25 January 1915 to Scottish parents, William Miller and Betsy (née Henry), both socialists. William Miller was an iron moulder and trade unionist who had moved to Salford with his wife, a charwoman, to look for work after being blacklisted in almost every foundry in Scotland. Betsy Miller knew many traditional folk songs such as "Lord Randall" and "My Bonnie Laddie's Lang A-growing".

James Miller was the youngest and only surviving child in the family of three sons and one daughter (one of each sex was stillborn and one son died at the age of four). They lived amongst a group of Scots and James was brought up in an atmosphere of fierce political debate interspersed with the large repertoire of songs and stories his parents had brought from Scotland. He was educated at Grecian Street School, Salford, England. He left school in 1930 after an elementary education, during the Great Depression and, joining the ranks of the unemployed, began a lifelong programme of self-education whilst keeping warm in Manchester Central Library. During this period he found intermittent work in a number of jobs and also made money as a street singer.

Miller joined the Young Communist League and a socialist amateur theatre troupe, the Clarion Players. He began his career as a writer helping produce and contributing humorous verse and skits to some of the Communist Party's factory papers. He was an activist in the unemployed workers' campaigns and the mass trespasses of the early 1930s. One of his best-known songs, "The Manchester Rambler", was written just after mass trespass of Kinder Scout. He was responsible for publicity in the planning of the trespass.

In 1932 the British intelligence service MI5 opened a file on MacColl after local police asserted that he was "a communist with very extreme views" who needed "special attention". For a time the Special Branch kept a watch on the Manchester home that he shared with his first wife, Joan Littlewood. MI5 caused some of MacColl's songs to be rejected by the BBC and prevented the employment of Littlewood as a BBC children's programme presenter (see: "Christmas tree" files).

== Personal life ==
He was married three times: to theatre director Joan Littlewood (1914–2002) from 1934 to 1948; to Jean Mary Newlove (1923–2017) from 1949 to 1974, with whom he had two children, a son Hamish (1950–2024), and a daughter, the singer-songwriter Kirsty MacColl (1959–2000); and to American folksinger Peggy Seeger (b. 1935) from 1977 until his death in 1989, with whom he had three children, Neill, Calum, and Kitty. He collaborated with Littlewood in the theatre, and with Seeger in folk music.

== Acting career ==
In 1931, with other unemployed members of the Clarion Players he formed an agit-prop theatre group, the "Red Megaphones". During 1934 they changed the name to "Theatre of Action" and not long after were introduced to a young actress recently moved up from London. This was Joan Littlewood who became MacColl's wife and work partner. In 1936, after a failed attempt to move to London, the couple returned to Manchester, and formed the Theatre Union. In 1940 a performance of The Last Edition – a 'living newspaper' – was halted by the police and MacColl and Littlewood were bound over for two years for breach of the peace. The necessities of wartime brought an end to Theatre Union. MacColl enlisted in the British Army during July 1940, but deserted in December. Why he did so, and why he was not prosecuted after the war, remain a mystery. In an interview in June 1987, he said that he was expelled for "anti-fascist activity". Allan Moore and Giovanni Vacca wrote that MacColl had been subject to Special Observation whilst in the King's Regiment, owing to his political views, and that the records show that, rather than being discharged, he was declared a deserter on 18 December 1940. In her autobiography, Joan Littlewood wrote that MacColl (then still known as Jimmie Miller) was stationed at Richmond, North Yorkshire and wrote to her regularly to say how much he hated it, and that he announced his change of name when she greeted him back at Manchester railway station. Littlewood also wrote that, when they were performing a play about military desertion after the war in Ormesby (close to where he had been stationed), MacColl was briefly arrested, after being recognised locally, and moved to an army detention barracks at Northallerton before being released after a few days.

In 1946, members of Theatre Union and others formed Theatre Workshop and spent the next few years touring, mostly in the north of England. In 1945, Miller changed his name to Ewan MacColl (influenced by the Lallans movement in Scotland).

In the Theatre Union roles had been shared, but now, in Theatre Workshop, they were more formalised. Littlewood was the sole producer and MacColl the dramaturge, art director and resident dramatist. The techniques that had been developed in the Theatre Union now were refined, producing the distinctive form of theatre that was the hallmark of Joan Littlewood's Theatre Workshop, as the troupe was later known. They were an impoverished travelling troupe, but were making a name for themselves.

== Music ==
=== Traditional music ===
During this period MacColl's enthusiasm for folk music grew. Inspired by the example of Alan Lomax, who had arrived in Britain and Ireland in 1950, and had done extensive fieldwork there, MacColl also began to collect and perform traditional ballads. His long involvement with Topic Records started in 1950 with his release of a single, "The Asphalter's Song", on that label. When, in 1953 Theatre Workshop decided to move to Stratford, London, MacColl, who had opposed that move, left the company and changed the focus of his career from acting and playwriting to singing and composing folk and topical songs.

In 1947, MacColl visited a retired lead-miner named Mark Anderson (1874–1953) in Middleton-in-Teesdale, County Durham, England, who performed to him a song called "Scarborough Fair"; MacColl recorded the lyrics and melody in a book of Teesdale folk songs, and later included it on his and Peggy Seeger's The Singing Island (1960). Martin Carthy learnt the song from MacColl's book, before teaching it to Paul Simon; Simon & Garfunkel released the song as "Scarborough Fair/Canticle" on their album Parsley, Sage, Rosemary and Thyme, popularising the obscure and unique folk tune. Ewan MacColl, a decade after collecting the song, released his own version accompanied by Peggy Seeger on guitar in 1957 on the LP "Matching Songs of the British Isles and America" and an a capella rendition another decade later on "The Long Harvest" (1967).

Over the years MacColl recorded and produced upwards of a hundred albums, many with English folk song collector and singer A. L. Lloyd. The pair released an ambitious series of eight LP albums of some 70 of the 305 Child Ballads. MacColl produced a number of LPs with Irish singer songwriter Dominic Behan, a brother of Irish playwright Brendan Behan.

In 1956, MacColl caused a scandal when he fell in love with 21-year-old Peggy Seeger, who had come to Britain to transcribe the music for Alan Lomax's anthology Folk Songs of North America (published in 1961). At the time MacColl, who was twenty years older than Peggy, was still married to his second wife.

=== Singer-songwriter ===
Seeger and MacColl recorded several albums of searing political commentary songs. MacColl himself wrote over 300 songs, some of which have been recorded by artists (in addition to those mentioned above) such as Planxty, the Dubliners, Dick Gaughan, Phil Ochs, the Clancy Brothers, Elvis Presley, Weddings Parties Anything, The Pogues and Johnny Cash. In 2001, The Essential Ewan MacColl Songbook was published, which includes the words and music to 200 of his songs. Dick Gaughan, Dave Burland and Tony Capstick collaborated in The Songs of Ewan MacColl (1978; 1985).

Many of MacColl's best-known songs were written for the theatre. For example, he wrote "The First Time Ever I Saw Your Face" very quickly at the request of Seeger, who needed it for use in a play she was appearing in. He taught it to her by long-distance telephone while she was on tour in the United States (from where MacColl had been barred because of his Communist past). Seeger said that MacColl used to send her tapes to listen to whilst they were apart and that the song was on one of them. This song, which was recorded by Roberta Flack for her debut album, First Take, issued by Atlantic records in June 1969, became a No. 1 hit in 1972 and won MacColl a Grammy Award for Song of the Year, while Flack received a Grammy Award for Record of the Year.

In 1959, MacColl began releasing LP albums on Folkways Records, including several collaborative albums with Peggy Seeger. His song "Dirty Old Town", inspired by his home town of Salford in Lancashire, was written for the play Landscape with Chimneys (1949) produced by Joan Littlewood and Theatre Workshop. (Note: In a BBC radio documentary about "Dirty Old Town", Professor Ben Harker (author of Class Act: The Cultural and Political Life of Ewan MacColl, 2007, Pluto Press) explains that although MacColl later claimed the song was written as an interlude "to cover an awkward scene change", studying the script of the play Landscape with Chimneys reveals the song occurs at the beginning and end of the play. Harker argues the song is important to the play because "it captures the movement from dreamy optimism and romance to militancy, frustration and anger. That's the trajectory of the song and of the play."Mike Sweeney (6 July 2024). "Dirty Old Town at 75". BBC Sounds.) It went on to become a folk-revival staple and was recorded by the Spinners (1964), Donovan (1964), Roger Whittaker (1968), Julie Felix (1968), the Dubliners (1968), Rod Stewart (1969), the Clancy Brothers (1970), the Pogues (1985), the Mountain Goats (2002), Simple Minds (2003), Ted Leo and the Pharmacists (2003), Frank Black (2006) and Bettye LaVette (2012).

MacColl's song "The Shoals of Herring", based on the life of Norfolk fisherman and folk singer Sam Larner was recorded by the Dubliners, the Clancy Brothers, the Corries and more. Other popular songs written and performed by MacColl include "The Manchester Rambler", "The Moving-On Song" and "The Joy of Living".

Ewan has a short biography of his work in the accompanying book of the Topic Records 70-year anniversary boxed set Three Score and Ten. Five of his recordings, three of them solo, appear in the boxed set:

- on CD #4:
  - track 2, "Come All Ye Fisher Lads", with the Fisher Family, from their album The Fisher Family.
- on CD #5:
  - track 4, "Go Down You Murderers", from Chorus from the Gallows
- on CD #6:
  - track 9, "To the Begging I Will Go", from Manchester Angel
  - track 14, "Sixteen Tons", with Brian Daly, from the single Sixteen Tons/The Swan Necked Valve
  - track 18, Dirty Old Town, from the single Dirty Old Town/Sheffield Apprentice.

=== Political songs ===
MacColl was one of the main composers of British protest songs during the folk revival of the 1950s and 1960s. In the early 1950s he penned "The Ballad of Ho Chi Minh" and "The Ballad of Stalin" for the British Communist Party.

Joe Stalin was a mighty man and a mighty man was he
He led the Soviet people on the road to victory.
All through the revolution he fought at Lenin's side,
And they made a combination till the day that Lenin died.

When asked about the song in a 1985 interview, he said that it was "a very good song" and that "it dealt with some of the positive things that Stalin did". In 1992, after his death, Peggy Seeger included it as an annex in her Essential Ewan MacColl Songbook, saying that she had originally planned to exclude the song on the grounds that Ewan would not have wanted it included, but decided to include it as an example of his work in his early career. The B-side of the record, Sovietland (Land of Freedom) was not included in the songbook.

MacColl sang and composed numerous protest and topical songs for the nuclear disarmament movement, for example "Against the Atom Bomb", The Vandals, Nightmare, and Nuclear Means Jobs.

He wrote "The Ballad of Tim Evans" (also known as "Go Down You Murderer") a song protesting against capital punishment, based on an infamous murder case in which an innocent man, Timothy Evans, was condemned and executed, before the real culprit was discovered.

MacColl was very active during the miners' strike of 1984–85 in distributing free cassettes of songs supportive of the National Union of Mineworkers, entitled Daddy, what did you do in the strike? The title song was unusually aggressive in its language towards the strikebreakers. This collection was only released on cassette and remaining copies are rare, but some of the less aggressive songs have featured on other compilations. At MacColl's 70th birthday party, he was presented by Arthur Scargill with a miner's lamp to show appreciation for his support.

In his last interview in August 1988, MacColl stated that he still believed in a socialist revolution and that the communist parties of the west had become too moderate. He stated that he had been a member of the Communist Party but left because he felt that the Soviet Union was "not communist or socialist enough".

== Radio ==
MacColl had been a radio actor since 1933. By the late 1930s he was writing scripts as well. In 1957 producer Charles Parker asked MacColl to collaborate in the creation of a feature programme about the heroic death of train driver John Axon. Normal procedure would have been to use the recorded field interviews only as source for writing the script. MacColl produced a script that incorporated the actual voices and so created a new form that they called the radio ballad.

Between 1957 and 1964, eight of these were broadcast by the BBC, all created by the team of MacColl and Parker together with Peggy Seeger who handled musical direction, conducted a great many field interviews, and wrote songs, either together with MacColl or alone. MacColl wrote the scripts and songs, as well as, with the others, collecting the field recordings which were the heart of the productions.

== Teaching and theatre ==
In 1965 Ewan and Peggy formed the Critics Group from a number of young followers, with Charles Parker in attendance, frequently recording the group's weekly sessions at MacColl and Seeger's home. The initial aim of improving musical skills soon broadened to performing at political events, the Singers' Club where MacColl, Seeger and Lloyd were featured artists and theatre productions. Members who became performing folk singers in their own right included Frankie Armstrong, John Faulkner, Sandra Kerr, Dennis Turner, Terry Yarnell, Bob Blair, Jim Carroll, Brian Pearson and Jack Warshaw. Other members, including Michael Rosen, joined primarily for theatre productions, the Festival of Fools, a political review of the previous year.

As the theatre group's importance grew, members more interested in singing left. The productions ran until the winter of 1972–73. Members' differences with MacColl's vision of a full-time touring company led to the group's breakup. The offshoot group became Combine Theatre, with a club of their own mixing traditional and original folksongs and theatrical performances based on contemporary events, into the 1980s.

== Death and legacy ==
After many years of poor health (in 1979 he suffered the first of many heart attacks), MacColl died on 22 October 1989, in the Brompton Hospital, in London, after complications following heart surgery. His autobiography Journeyman was published the following year. The lifetime archive of his work with Peggy Seeger and others was passed on to Ruskin College in Oxford.

There is a plaque dedicated to MacColl in Russell Square in London. The inscription includes: "Presented by his communist friends 25.1.1990 ... Folk Laureate – Singer – Dramatist – Marxist ... in recognition of strength and singleness of purpose of this fighter for Peace and Socialism". In 1991 he was awarded a posthumous honorary degree by the University of Salford.

His daughter from his second marriage, Kirsty MacColl, followed him into a musical career, albeit in a different genre. She died in a boating accident in Mexico in 2000. His son with Peggy Seeger, Neill MacColl, is the long-standing guitarist for Mancunian musician David Gray. His grandson Jamie MacColl has also developed a musical career of his own with the band Bombay Bicycle Club.

In 2025, punk band Dropkick Murphys along with guest Billy Bragg covered MacColl's song "School Days Are Over" on their album For the People. The song is a favorite of Bragg's.

== Bibliography ==
- Goorney, Howard and MacColl, Ewan (eds.) (1986) Agit-Prop to Theatre Workshop, Political Playscripts, 1930–1950. Manchester: Manchester University Press ISBN 0-7190-2211-8
- Harker, Ben (2007) Class Act: the Cultural and Political Life of Ewan MacColl. London: Pluto Press ISBN 978-0-7453-2165-3 (chapters: 1. Lower Broughton—2. Red Haze—3. Welcome, Comrade—4. Browned Off—5. A Richer, Fuller Life—6. Towards a People's Culture—7. Croydon, Soho, Moscow, Paris—8. Bard of Beckenham—9. Let a Hundred Flowers Blossom—10. Sanctuary—11. Endgame)
- Littlewood, Joan (1994) Joan's Book: Joan Littlewood's Peculiar History As She Tells It. London: Methuen ISBN 0-413-77318-3"Joan's Book reissued".
- MacColl, Ewan (1963) Ewan MacColl- Peggy Seeger Songbook. New York: Oak Publications, Inc Library of Congress Card Number, 63-14092
- MacColl, Ewan (1990) Journeyman: an Autobiography; introduction by Peggy Seeger. London: Sidgwick & Jackson ISBN 0-283-06036-0
- MacColl, Ewan (1998) The Essential Ewan MacColl Songbook: sixty years of songmaking; ed. Peggy Seeger. New York: Oak Publications
- Myer, Michael Grosvenor (1972): The Radio Ballads Revisited, Folk Review magazine, September 1972
- O'Brien, Karen (2004) Kirsty MacColl, The One and Only: the definitive biography . London: Andre Deutsch. ISBN 0-233-00070-4
- Pegg, Carole A. (1999) British Traditional and Folk Musics, in: British Journal of Ethnomusicology, vol. 7, pp. 193–98
- Samuel, Raphael; MacColl, Ewan; and Cosgrove, Stuart (1985) Theatres of the Left, 1880–1935: Workers' Theatre Movements in Britain and America. London: Routledge & Kegan Paul ISBN 0-7100-0901-1
- Vacca, Giovanni and Moore, Allan F. (2014) Legacies of Ewan MacColl – The Last Interview. Farnham: Ashgate. ISBN 978-1-4094-2431-4

== Discography ==
Solo albums

- Scots Street Songs (1956)
- Shuttle and Cage (1957)
- Barrack Room Ballads (1958)
- Still I Love Him (1958)
- Bad Lads and Hard Cases (1959)
- Songs of Robert Burns (1959)
- Haul on the Bowlin'(1961)
- The English and Scottish Popular Ballads (Child Ballads) (1961)
- Broadside Ballads, vols 1 and 2 (1962)
- Off to Sea Once More (1963)
- Four Pence a Day (1963)
- British Industrial Folk songs (1963)
- Bundook Ballads (1967)
- The Wanton Muse (1968)
- Paper Stage 1 (1969)
- Paper Stage 2 (1969)
- Solo Flight (1972)

Collaboration – Bob and Ron Copper, Ewan MacColl, Isla Cameron, Seamus Ennis and Peter Kennedy

- As I Roved Out (1953–54)

Collaboration – A. L. Lloyd, Ewan MacColl, Louis Killen, Ian Campbell, Cyril Tawney, Sam Larner and Harry H. Corbett

- Blow the Man Down (EP) (1956)

Collaboration – with A. L. Lloyd

- A Hundred Years Ago (EP) (1956)
- The Coast of Peru (EP) (1956)
- The Singing Sailor (1956)
- The English and Scottish Popular Ballads (The Child Ballads) Vol 1 (1956)
- The English and Scottish Popular Ballads (The Child Ballads) Vol 2 (1956)
- The English and Scottish Popular Ballads (The Child Ballads) Vol 3 (1956)
- The English and Scottish Popular Ballads (The Child Ballads) Vol 4 (1956)
- The English and Scottish Popular Ballads (The Child Ballads) Vol 5 (1956)
- Gamblers and Sporting Blades (E.P.) (1962) (accompanied by Steve Benbow)
- Bold Sportsmen All: Gamblers & Sporting Blades (1962, with Roy Harris)
- English and Scottish Folk Ballads (1964)
- A Sailor's Garland (1966)
- Blow Boys Blow (1967)

Ewan MacColl and Peggy Seeger

- Matching Songs of the British Isles and America (1957)
- Bless 'Em All and other British Soldier's Songs (1957)
- Second Shift – Industrial Ballads (1958)
- Chorus From The Gallows (1960)
- Popular Scottish Songs (1960)
- New Briton Gazette, Vol. 1 (1960)
- Songs Against the Bomb (1960)
- Classic Scots Ballads (1961)
- Bothy Ballads of Scotland (1961)
- Two Way Trip (1961)
- New Briton Gazette, Vol. 2 (1962)
- Jacobite Songs – The Two Rebellions 1715 and 1745 (1962)
- Steam Whistle Ballads (1964)
- Traditional Songs and Ballads (1964)
- The Amorous Muse (1966)
- The Manchester Angel (1966)
- The Long Harvest 1 (1966)
- The Long Harvest 2 (1967)
- The Long Harvest 3 (1968)
- The Angry Muse (1968)
- The Long Harvest 4 (1969)
- The Long Harvest 5 (1970)
- The World Of Ewan MacColl And Peggy Seeger (1970)
- The Long Harvest 6 (1971)
- The Long Harvest 7 (1972)
- The World Of Ewan MacColl And Peggy Seeger Vol. 2 – Songs from Radio Ballads (1972)
- At The Present Moment (1972)
- Folkways Record of Contemporary Songs (1973)
- The Long Harvest 8 (1973)
- The Long Harvest 9 (1974)
- The Long Harvest 10 (1975)
- Saturday Night at The Bull and Mouth (1977)
- Cold Snap (1977)
- Hot Blast (1978)
- Blood and Roses (1979)
- Kilroy Was Here (1980)
- Blood and Roses 2 (1981)
- Blood and Roses 3 (1982)
- Blood and Roses 4 (1982)
- Blood and Roses 5 (1983)
- Freeborn Man (1983) [reissued 1989]
- Daddy, What did You Do in The Strike? (1984) [cassette mini-album]
- White Wind, Black Tide – Anti-Apartheid Songs (1986) [cassette album]
- Items of News (1986)

Ewan MacColl/The Radio Ballads (1958–1964)*

- Ballad of John Axon (1958)
- Song of a Road (1959)
- Singing The Fishing (1960)
- The Big Hewer (1961)
- The Body Blow (1962)
- On The Edge (1963)
- The Fight Game (1964)
- The Travelling People (1964)

(* Mixture of documentary, drama and song: broadcast on BBC radio)

Singles

- "Van Dieman's Land" / "Lord Randall"
- "Sir Patrick Spens" / "Eppie Morrie"
- "Parliamentary Polka" / "Song of Choice"
- "Housewife's Alphabet" / "My Son"
- "The Shoals of Herring"

Posthumous compilations

- Naming of Names (1990) (LP/CD)
- Black and White (1991) (CD)

Compilation appearances

- The Unfortunate Rake (1960)
- The Iron Muse (1993) (CD)
- It Was Mighty – The Early Days of Irish Music in London (2016) from Topic Records includes a number of recordings made by MacColl

== Quotation ==
My function is not to reassure people. I want to make them uncomfortable. To send them out of the place arguing and talking.
