= Timperley =

Suburb of Trafford, in Greater Manchester, England

Coordinates: 53.387°N 2.328°W

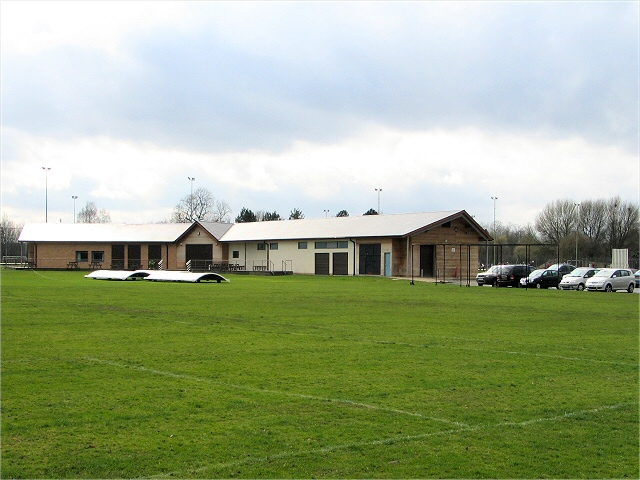
- Timperley Sports Club in 2006

- Location within Greater Manchester
- Population: 11,323 (2021 census)
- Metropolitan borough: Trafford
- Metropolitan county: Greater Manchester
- Region: North West
- Country: England
- Sovereign state: United Kingdom
- Post town: ALTRINCHAM
- Postcode district: WA15
- Dialling code: 0161
- Police: Greater Manchester
- Fire: Greater Manchester
- Ambulance: North West
- UK Parliament: Altrincham and Sale West

Timperley is a suburban area in the borough of Trafford, in Greater Manchester, England. Within the boundaries of the historic county of Cheshire, it lies approximately 6 miles (10 km) south-west of central Manchester. The population at the 2021 census was 11,323.

Timperley extends from the A56 road, in the west, to the main Stockport Road roundabout on the A560, in the east. Much of the housing stock dates from the 1930s onwards. Typically, houses are slightly larger than the traditional northern terraces; older houses tend to be in the red brick cottage style of north Cheshire.

== History ==
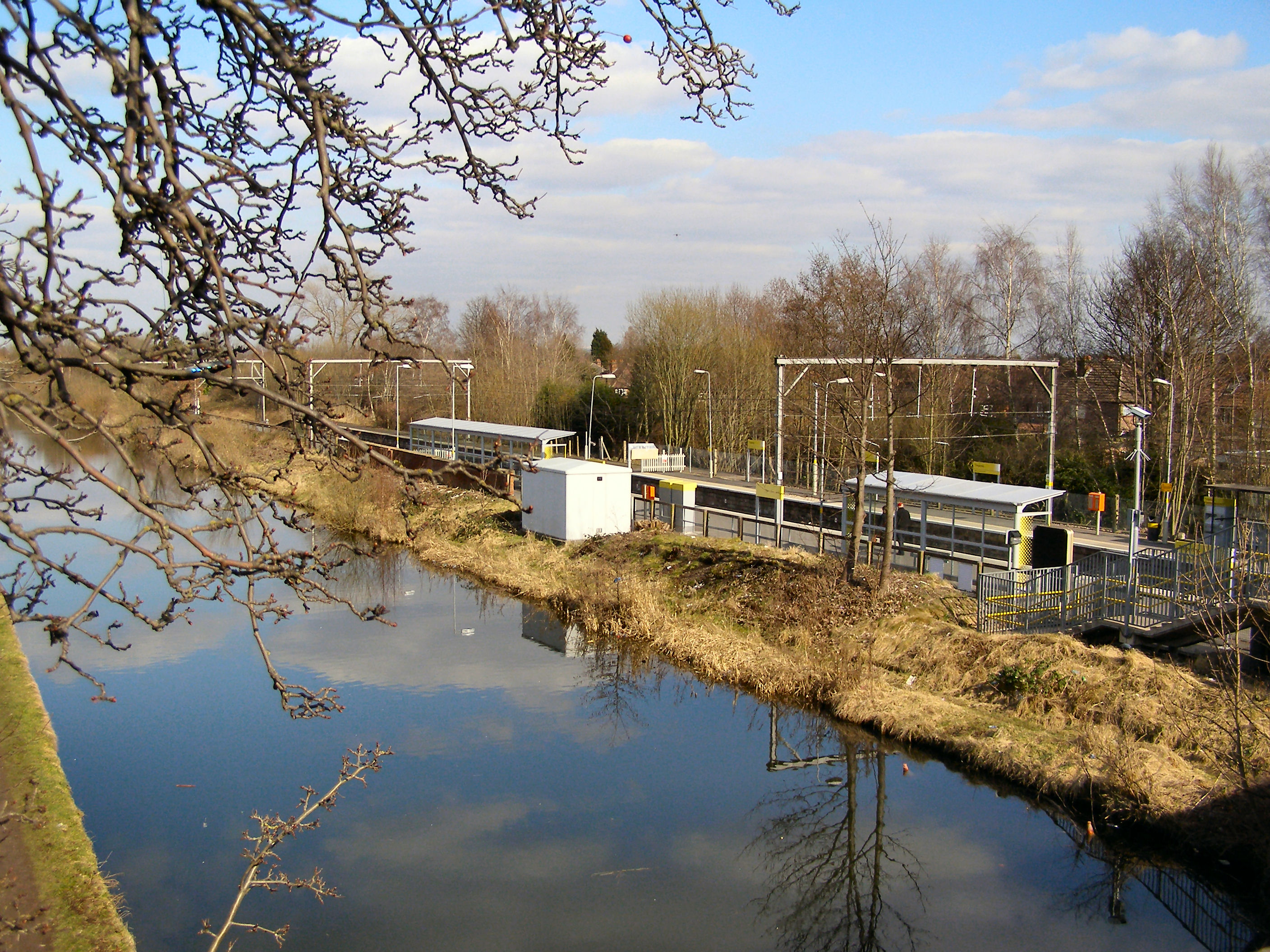
The Bridgewater Canal, with the Metrolink station in the background

The name Timperley derives from Timber Leah, the Anglo-Saxon (Old English) for a "clearing in the forest"; this can be used to roughly date the settlement of Timperley to between the 7th and 8th centuries. It was a predominantly agricultural settlement before the Industrial Revolution, focusing mainly on arable crops.

The Bridgewater Canal branch from Stretford to Runcorn was built through Timperley and opened in 1776. This improvement in transport encouraged the development of market gardening in the area to serve the growing city of Manchester. The city also provided a source of night soil, which was unloaded from the canal by Deansgate Lane to provide manure for farms and market gardens.

=== Railways ===
During the mid-19th century, four railways were built in Timperley:

- The Manchester, South Junction and Altrincham Railway (MSJAR) opened in 1849, with a station in Timperley on Wash Lane (now Park Road).
- The Warrington and Stockport Railway (W&SR) opened in 1854 from Timperley Junction, just south of the station on the MSJAR. It became part of the London and North Western Railway (LNWR) in 1859.
- Timperley curve was built in 1879 by the Manchester, Sheffield and Lincolnshire Railway (MS&LR) linking Skelton Junction with Timperley Junction.
- The Stockport, Timperley and Altrincham Junction Railway was built through Timperley to link with the now LNWR W&S at Broadheath Junction opening in February 1866 and, from Skelton Junction, to link with the MSJAR at Deansgate Junction opening in December 1865. This became part of the Cheshire Lines Committee (CLC). Baguley station also served the area on this line.

The CLC line (often referred to as the West Timperley line) from Skelton Junction to Glazebrook was opened in 1873. West Timperley station on this line was actually in Broadheath. The arrival of the railways brought the middle classes from the centre of Manchester and this is reflected by the increase of numbers in domestic services in Timperley at the same time. The impact of the railway can be seen in Timperley's population between 1851 and 1871, which more than doubled from 1,008 to 2,112.

In 1931, the MSJAR line was electrified; it was one of the first railway lines in Great Britain to use supply by overhead cables. A large electrical substation was built in connection with this, just south of Timperley station.

The line was converted to light rail in 1992, forming part of Manchester Metrolink.

== Governance ==
Timperley was formerly a township and chapelry in the parish of Bowdon. In 1866, the township became a separate civil parish; Timperley Parish Council was established in 1894 and it became part of Bucklow Rural District.

In 1931, the parish had a population of 7,080. On 1 April 1936, the parish was abolished and merged with Altrincham, Hale and Sale and it became part of Altrincham Urban District (UD).

In 1974, Altrincham UD was merged into the new Metropolitan Borough of Trafford in Greater Manchester. The wards of Timperley Central and Timperley North have six of the 63 seats on Trafford Council; both wards returned three Liberal Democrats each at the 2023 local elections. Parts of Timperley are also in Broadheath and Hale Barns & Timperley South wards.

Since 1997, Timperley has formed part of the Altrincham and Sale West constituency; before that, it was encompassed by the Altrincham and Sale constituency. Since 2024, it has been represented in the House of Commons by Connor Rand of the Labour Party.

== Geography ==
Timperley lies to the north-east of Altrincham; it is bounded by Fairywell Brook to the east, Hale Moss and Well Green to the south, Timperley Brook to the west, and Baguley Brook to the north.

It has borders with the areas of Altrincham to the south, Sale to the north and the City of Manchester suburb of Wythenshawe to the east.

Areas of Timperley include:

- Village - the main focal point, at the junction of Stockport Road/Thorley Lane/Park Road
- West Timperley - north-west from the Metrolink station towards Manchester Road
- Timperley Heyes - to the north, covering Grange Estate, Heyes Lane and Riddings
- Timperley Brook - to the west, towards Altrincham
- Higher Timperley - area to the south-west, bounded by Thorley Lane/Wood Lane
- Broomwood estate - to the south.

Timperley was struck by an F0/T1 tornado on 23 November 1981, as part of the record-breaking nationwide tornado outbreak on that day.

== Demography ==
Timperley ethnicity compared
UK Census 2021	Timperley	Trafford	England
Total population	11,323	235,100	56,489,800
White	82.7%	77.8%	81.7%
Asian	11.1%	12.6%	9.3%
Black	1.6%	3.4%	4.0%
Christian	54.0%	48.4%	46.2%
Muslim	5.1%	8.7%	6.5%
No religion	32.0%	33.1%	37.2%
Over 65 years old	19.9%	17.6%	18.6%

At the 2021 UK census, the area of Timperley delivered the following statistics: (Note: Percentages are taken from averages of data from West Timperley, Timperley North, Timperley South and Timperley East (which includes Broomwood).)

- It had a total population of 11,323. The population density was 4,215 per km^{2}; for every 100 females, there were 95.1 males. Of those aged over 16, 11.6% had no academic qualifications, lower than the 14% in all of Trafford and 18.2% in England. Of all households, 55.1% were married heterosexual couples living together and 0.3% were cohabiting married same-sex couples.
- With 87.8% being born in United Kingdom, there is a low proportion of foreign-born residents. There is also a low proportion of non-white people, as 82.7% of residents were recorded as white. The largest minority group was recorded as Asian, at 11.1% of the population.

== Economy ==
At the 2021 UK census, Timperley had a low rate of unemployment (1.8%), compared with Trafford (2.6%) and England (3.4%). People living in Timperley were also typically close to their workplace, with 42.5% mainly working from home and 34.5% being fewer than 6.2 miles (10 km) from where they work.

According to the 2001 UK census, the industry of employment of residents in Timperley was 17.8% property and business services, 16.2% retail and wholesale, 11.9% manufacturing, 11.2% health and social work, 8.6% education, 8.0% transport and communications, 6.4% finance, 6.0% construction, 4.3% public administration and defence, 3.6% hotels and restaurants, 0.9% energy and water supply, 0.6% agriculture, and 4.2% other.

== Education ==
Primary schools in Timperley include:

- Broomwood
- Cloverlea
- Heyes Lane
- Park Road
- St Hugh's Catholic
- Willows.

Secondary schools include:

- Altrincham College
- Wellington School.

Brentwood School and Pictor School are special schools in Timperley, while Forest School is a private school.

Trafford College has a campus in West Timperley, offering further education to students from across the borough.

== Religion ==
According to the 2011 UK census, the religious make up of Trafford is 63.4% Christian, 5.7% Muslim, 1.0% Hindu, 1.1% Jewish and 0.3% Buddhist. 21.2% were recorded as having no religion, 0.2% had an alternative religion and 6.3% did not state their religion.

Timperley is in the Church of England Diocese of Chester with Christ Church as the parish church and Holy Cross Church as a second place of worship. Timperley is in the Roman Catholic Diocese of Shrewsbury,

== Transport ==
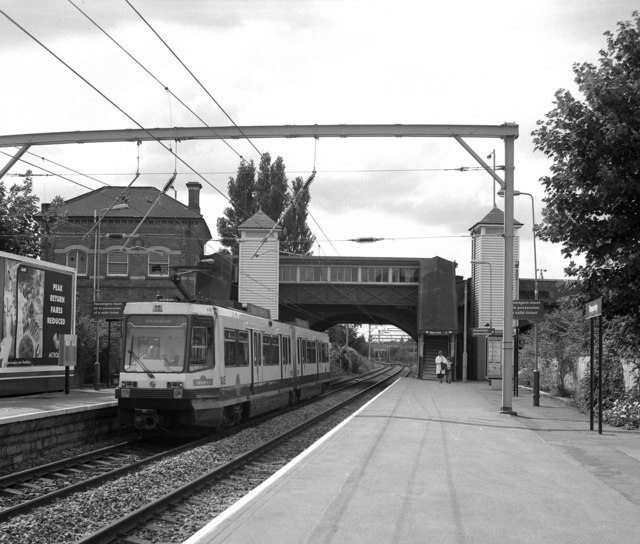
Timperley Metrolink station

The Manchester Metrolink tram network passes about 0.75 miles (1.2 km) west of the village centre. Timperley tram stop is on Park Road and lies on the Altrincham Line. It is served by two lines; the service pattern is:

- Green line: services between Altrincham and Bury, via Manchester Victoria, depart every 12 minutes
- Purple line: services between Altrincham and Piccadilly depart every 12 minutes; evening services extend to Etihad Campus.

Navigation Road station is located just outside Timperley, in east Altrincham, on the Mid-Cheshire Line. Northern Trains operates hourly services between Manchester Piccadilly, Stockport, Northwich and Chester, with additional trains at peak times. The Sunday service runs at a two-hourly frequency.

Timperley is served by Metroline Manchester and Stagecoach Manchester bus routes, which connect the area with Altrincham, Cheadle, Sale and Stockport.

== Culture ==
The South Trafford Archaeological Group (STAG) was formed in 1979, which provides facilities for volunteer archaeologists from south Manchester and north-east Cheshire. The group is based near Timperley Old Hall and the clubhouse of the Altrincham Municipal Golf Course. STAG have been involved with sites such as Carrs Mill in Stalybridge, Moss Brow farm in Warburton, Moore's hat factory in Denton, the medieval hall in Urmston and the medieval moated site of Timperley Old Hall.

Since 1984, Timperley has held a country fair every September on the open ground of Lark Hill, by Thorley Lane. It has a variety of art, craft and charity stalls, all organised by a small committee of local residents.

The Altrincham and District Astronomical Society meets ten times a year.

== Sport ==
Timperley Cricket Club was founded in 1877; itmoved to its present site in 1883, near Altrincham Municipal Golf Club.

Timperley Hockey Club was formed in 1886, the first in the north of England.

Timperley Sports Club provides facilities for cricket, hockey, football and lacrosse. In 2006, the club was named Trafford Sports Club of the Year and Greater Manchester Sports Club of the Year.

Golf has been played on the site of Altrincham municipal course since 1893, when Timperley Golf Club was founded. Altrincham Golf Club offers competitive golf on a large scale. There are major competitions on most weekends between April and October.

== Notable residents ==
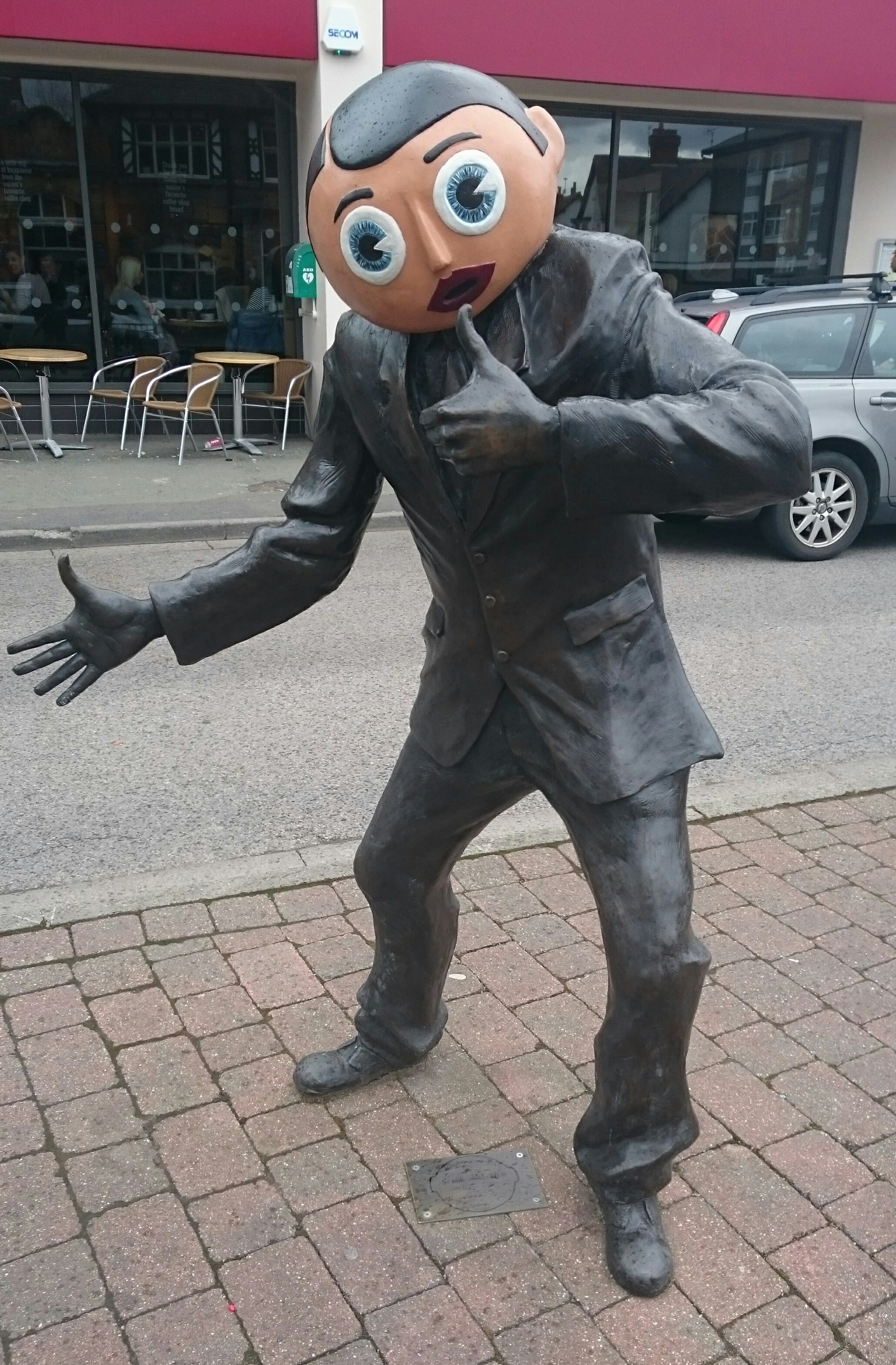
The Frank Sidebottom statue in Timperley town centre

- Ian Brown and John Squire, founders of the Stone Roses
- Caroline Aherne, comedy writer and actress (The Royle Family, The Fast Show and The Mrs Merton Show), died in 2016.
- Roger Ashton-Griffiths, film actor (Gangs of New York, Brazil and Young Sherlock Holmes), grew up in Timperley
- Paul Hanley, member of the Lovers and former member of the Fall
- John Noel Nichols, wholesaler of spices and medicines and inventor of Vimto, died in 1966
- Louis Oosthuizen, professional golfer and winner of the 2010 British Open (one of golf's majors), based in Timperley during the European season
- Benny Rothman, political activist, most famous for his leading role in the mass trespass of Kinder Scout in 1932, died in 2002
- Chris Sievey (more popularly known as his comic character Frank Sidebottom), comedian and musician, died 2010. A statue of Sievey in his Frank Sidebottom guise was unveiled in Timperley town centre on 20 October 2013
- Cyril Washbrook, cricketer Lancashire and England, died in 1999
- Keith Skues, BBC radio presenter and producer, born in 1939 at Timperley Lodge
- John Thompson, English-born, Canadian poet, born in Timperley, 1938, died in Sackville, New Brunswick in 1976.

== See also ==
- Listed buildings in Altrincham
