= 1968 Altrincham Municipal Borough Council election =

Local election in Cheshire, England

- 9 May 1968

8 of 32 seats to Altrincham Municipal Borough Council 16 seats needed for a majority
	First party	Second party	Third party
Party	Conservative	Labour	Liberal
Last election	6 seats, 48.3%	1 seats, 34.1%	1 seats, 16.9%
Seats before	19	7	3
Seats won	6	1	1
Seats after	20	6	3
Seat change	▲1	▼1	Steady
Popular vote	6,897	2,324	2,231
Percentage	57.7%	19.5%	18.7%
Swing	▲9.4%	▼14.6%	▲1.8%
	Fourth party
Party	Independent
Last election	0 seats, 0.0%
Seats before	3
Seats won	0
Seats after	3
Seat change	Steady
Popular vote	189
Percentage	1.6%
Swing	▲1.6
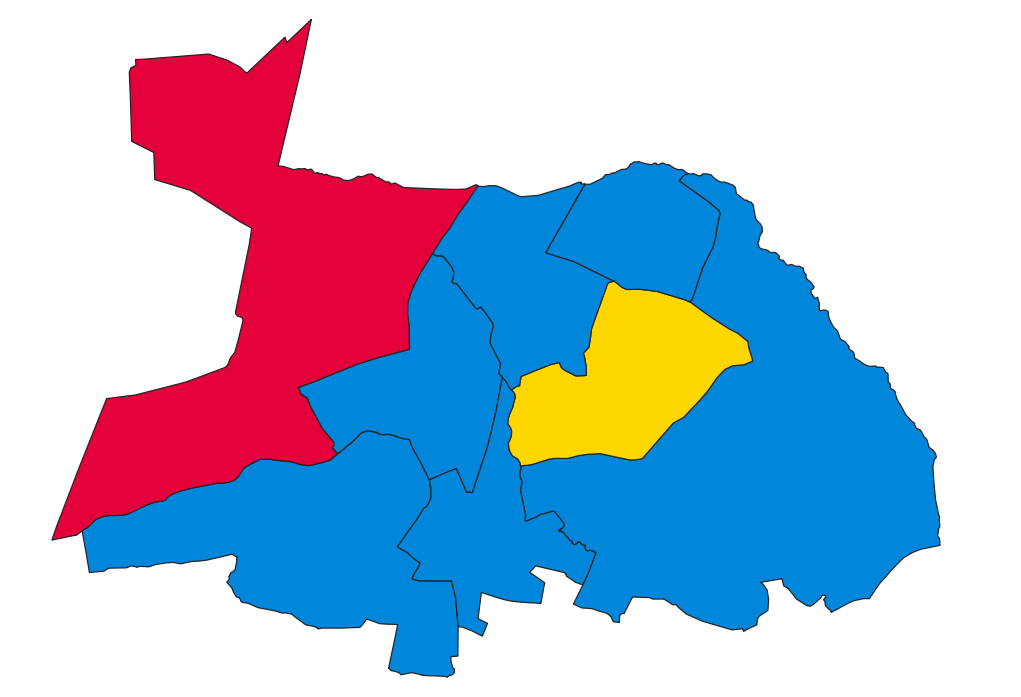
- Map of results of 1968 election
Leader of the Council before election
Conservative
Leader of the Council after election
Conservative

Elections to Altrincham Council were held on Thursday, 9 May 1968. One third of the councillors were up for election, with each successful candidate to serve a three-year term of office. The Conservative Party retained overall control of the council.

== Election result ==
Party	Votes		Seats			Full Council	
Conservative Party	6,897 (57.7%)	▲9.4	6 (75.0%)	6 / 8	▲1	20 (62.5%)	20 / 32
Labour Party	2,324 (19.5%)	▼14.6	1 (12.5%)	1 / 8	▼1	6 (18.8%)	6 / 32
Liberal Party	2,231 (18.7%)	▲1.8	1 (12.5%)	1 / 8	Steady	3 (9.4%)	3 / 32
Independent	189 (1.6%)	▲1.6	0 (0.0%)	0 / 8	Steady	3 (9.4%)	3 / 32
Communist Party	303 (2.5%)	▼1.8	0 (0.0%)	0 / 8	Steady	0 (0.0%)	0 / 32

=== Full council ===
↓
6	3	3	20

=== Aldermen ===
↓
1	3	4

=== Councillors ===
↓
5	3	16

== Ward results ==
=== Dunham ===
Dunham
Party	Candidate	Votes	%	±%
Labour	E. M. Hoyle*	845	85.5	−5.6
Communist	B. Rothman	143	14.5	+5.6
Majority		702	71.0	−11.2
Turnout		988		
Labour hold		Swing		

=== East Central ===
East Central
Party	Candidate	Votes	%	±%
Conservative	S. T. Jenkinson	613	63.7	+10.1
Labour	R. E. Singer	350	36.3	−10.1
Majority		263	27.4	+20.2
Turnout		963		
Conservative gain from Labour		Swing		

=== North ===
North
Party	Candidate	Votes	%	±%
Conservative	J. G. Warburton	852	57.2	+12.3
Labour	L. M. Smith*	478	32.1	−7.9
Communist	E. Sheldon	160	10.7	N/A
Majority		374	25.1	+20.2
Turnout		1,490		
Conservative gain from Labour		Swing		

=== South West ===
South West
Party	Candidate	Votes	%	±%
Conservative	K. A. Harrison*	830	81.5	+21.3
Independent	K. Jagger	189	18.5	N/A
Majority		641	63.0	+42.6
Turnout		1,019		
Conservative hold		Swing		

=== Timperley (1) ===
Timperley (1)
Party	Candidate	Votes	%	±%
Conservative	F. R. Metcalf*	967	63.7	−7.4
Liberal	R. Sands	552	36.3	N/A
Majority		415	27.4	−14.8
Turnout		1,519		
Conservative hold		Swing		

=== Timperley (2) ===
Timperley (2)
Party	Candidate	Votes	%	±%
Conservative	A. E. Jackson	989	67.9	+22.4
Liberal	K. D. Burton	468	32.1	+11.9
Majority		521	35.8	+24.6
Turnout		1,457		
Conservative hold		Swing		

=== Timperley (3) ===
Timperley (3)
Party	Candidate	Votes	%	±%
Liberal	M. W. F. Hiett*	1,211	57.9	+3.2
Conservative	E. Richardson	879	42.1	−3.2
Majority		332	15.8	+6.4
Turnout		2,090		
Liberal hold		Swing		

=== Timperley (4) ===
Timperley (4)
Party	Candidate	Votes	%	±%
Conservative	R. Hall*	1,767	73.1	+18.5
Labour	J. Siddall	651	26.9	−18.5
Majority		1,116	46.2	+37.0
Turnout		2,418		
Conservative hold		Swing		
