= Altrincham College =

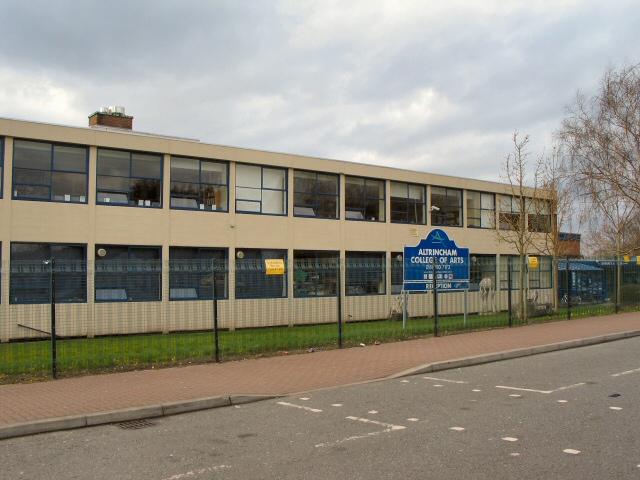

Location
- Green Lane; Timperley; Altrincham, Greater Manchester, WA15 8QW; England; 53.38677°N 2.32157°W

Information
- Type: Academy
- Local authority: Trafford Council
- Trust: Achieve + Learn Trust
- Department for Education URN: 138614 Tables
- Ofsted: Reports
- Head teacher: K Earle
- Gender: Coeducational
- Age: 11 to 18
- Website: www.altrinchamcollege.com

Altrincham College is a non-selective secondary school and sixth form located in Timperley (near Altrincham ), Trafford, England. The school is an academy and is part of the Achieve and Learn Trust.

== Description ==
There are approximately 80 teachers in the school and approximately 1000 pupils.

== Buildings ==
Recent additions in previous years to the school include a large sports hall (on opening the guest of honour was Bobby Charlton) with a fitness suite also a separate building for 2 history rooms and an extra art room. In 2011, a £5.6million sixth form was added onto the school, allowing the school's students to carry on their education in the school from the ages of 11–18 years old. The school is affiliated with Young Enterprise which some pupils are involved in, during year 10 & 11.
