= John Thompson (Canadian poet) =

English-born Canadian poet (1938–1976)

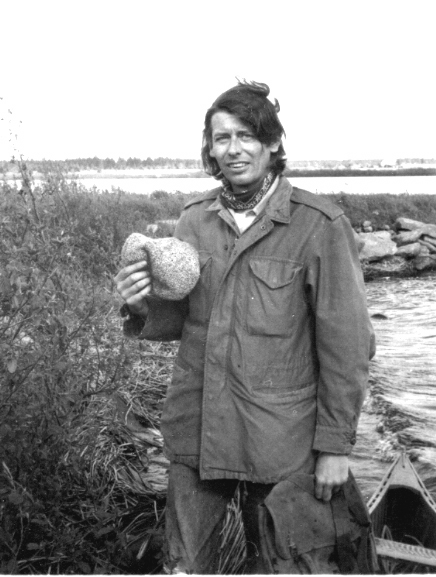
- John Thompson in 1971
- Born: March 17, 1938; Timperley, England
- Died: April 26, 1976 (aged 38); Sackville, New Brunswick
- Citizenship: Canadian
- Education: PhD
- Alma mater: Michigan State University
- Occupations: Poet, translator, professor
- Writing career
- Genre: Poetry
- Notable works: At the Edge of the Chopping there are no Secrets, Stilt Jack

John Thompson (17 Mar 1938 – 26 Apr 1976) was an English-born, Canadian poet, translator and university professor. He is noted for his mastery of poetic forms, which he used to express the intensity and power of images in spare and precise language evoking beauty and wonder, anguish and despair. Thompson's second and best-known book, Stilt Jack, a collection of 38 ghazals published after his death, records his poetic journeys through darkness in an uncertain quest for the light. His first collection, At the Edge of the Chopping there are no Secrets published in 1973, conveys vivid images of natural cycles of death and rebirth in the wooded and marshy landscapes of southeastern New Brunswick where an apple tree in late summer is seen as a cauldron of leaves, a charred dancer and a head of burnt hair. Thompson has been described as one of 20th century Canada's most influential poets.

Periodically throughout his short life, Thompson suffered from severe mental disorders including depression, mania and paranoia. He also struggled with the alcoholism that contributed to his early death. Other poets who influenced him, such as Dylan Thomas, Theodore Roethke and John Berryman, were afflicted in similar ways. Thompson's erratic behaviour combined with his frequent hostility to others he considered literary philistines hampered his academic career and blighted his closest personal relationships. One critic complained that some of his poems read less like "stunning epiphanies" than "crossword puzzles" because Thompson composed them while he was drinking, but others praised him for his disciplined and meticulous dedication to his poetic art.

In his introduction to Stilt Jack in which he writes briefly about ghazals (or "guzzles" as he called them), Thompson could have been describing the essential elements of his own poetry when he asserted that the form allows the imagination to move in its own natural ways: "discovering an alien design, illogical and without sense — a chart of the disorderly, against false reason and the tacking together of poor narratives. It is the poem of contrasts, dreams, astonishing leaps. The ghazal has been called 'drunken and amatory' and I think it is."

== Life ==
John Thompson was born in Timperley, England in 1938. Following the death of his father and abandonment by his mother, he was educated at various boarding schools and the Manchester Grammar School. He received his B.A. in honours psychology from the University of Sheffield in 1958. Following two years service in the British Army intelligence corps, he studied comparative literature at Michigan State University and received his Ph.D. He studied under A. J. M. Smith and his thesis entailed the translation of poems by the French poet René Char. In 1966 he moved to Canada and taught English literature at Mount Allison University in New Brunswick. His first collection of poetry, At the Edge of the Chopping there are no Secrets (1973), received mixed reviews. This was followed by a divorce and a fire that consumed his home and most of his manuscripts. He wrote the 38 poems in his second - and last - collection, Stilt Jack, while in Toronto on a sabbatical.

The cause of his death at the age of 38, immediately after Stilt Jack was completed, remains the subject of debate. In the fall of 1975, Thompson wrote his will. At Christmas, he broke down and ended up in the hospital. On his release three months later, instead of abiding by the doctor's orders not to mix drugs and alcohol, he continued to drink steadily. He finished Stilt Jack in April. On April 24, Thompson gave the manuscript to his friend and fellow poet, Douglas Lochhead. After he had returned home, the tenants in the apartment below heard muffled choking and cries. He was discovered comatose and pronounced dead on arrival at the hospital. James Polk describes the cause of death as "a brutal mix of barbiturates and liquor." The autopsy did not provide conclusive evidence that Thompson killed himself.

Thompson's poems, published and unpublished, including his translations of French and Québécois poets, John Thompson: Collected Poems and Translations, and a biographical essay by the editor, Peter Sanger, were published by Goose Lane Editions (Fredericton) in 1995.

In 2000, in The Danforth Review, Dan Reve wrote, "[The ghazal] is a rarefied, peculiar and therefore powerful form... John Thompson is to be credited with the introduction and dissemination of the ghazal in Canada. His Stilt Jack is one of literature's odd, incommensurable works of genius."

== Bibliography ==
- At the Edge of the Chopping there are No Secrets (1973)
- Stilt Jack (1978)
- I Dream Myself Into Being: Collected Poems, foreword by James Polk (Anansi, 1991, reissued in 2006)
- John Thompson: Collected Poems and Translations, edited by Peter Sanger (Goose Lane Editions, 1995)
