= Challenge (Communist journal) =

Magazine of Britain's communist youth

- Format: Online
- Publisher: Young Communist League
- Founded: 1935
- Country: United Kingdom
- Based in: London
- Language: English
- Website: https://challenge-magazine.org/
- ISSN: 2634-2197

Challenge is the magazine of the Young Communist League, the youth wing of the Communist Party of Britain. It was originally called Young Worker, and then Young Communist, before being re-established in 1935. The magazine is not to be confused with The Challenge of Youth which was, in its day, a primary publication of the Young People's Socialist League back when it was associated with the Socialist Party of America (YPSL is now politically and organisationally separate from the SPA).

== History ==
The first issue was published in March 1935, and it has been produced intermittently ever since. In the mid-1970s while the YCL was influenced by youth trends, the publication was re-designed to give it a punk zine aesthetic. When the Communist Party was re-established in 1988 as the Communist Party of Britain, the YCL published its magazine under the title Young Communist, however in 2000 it was renamed back to Challenge with issue No.1 published in November/October that year. An online edition was launched in May 2020.

The magazine was sold outside factories and schools, alongside the Daily Worker. In 1971, each issue sold around 9000 times, and there were 17000 copies of the summer edition.

== Aims ==
The aim of the journal is, according to the YCL, to cover

all the latest news and views of the YCL, as well as articles covering important international developments, working-class history, culture, different campaigns and struggles taking place in Britain and the rest of the world, as well as regular features such as the Back 2 Basics series (Marxist concepts made easy), the Industrial Diary, and Uncle Joe's Book at Bedtime (a review of some classic Marxist texts).

— "Challenge". Young Communist League. Archived from the original on 30 October 2008.

Challenge aims to be the voice of Britain’s young communists reporting on the latest domestic and international news from a Marxist–Leninist and anti-imperialist perspective.

== See also ==
- Young Communist League
