= Alive Alive-O =

Live album by The Dubliners
- Released: 1997
- Recorded: 1996
- Genre: Irish folk

The Dubliners chronology
Further Along (1996)	Alive Alive-O (1997)	40 Years (2002)

Alive Alive-O is a double album by the Irish folk group The Dubliners which was recorded live over several evenings in December 1996 in Germany at the end of their European tour.

After the departure of Ronnie Drew, The Dubliners were joined by the famous Irish singer Paddy Reilly who lends his voice to several ballads on the album. John Sheahan's daughter Ceoladh guests with her father, duetting on fiddle with him on his composition, "Among Friends".

The album is notable for some mixed German-English song introductions by Sean Cannon, causing widespread laughter among the audience.

== Track listing ==
=== Disc One ===
1. "Fairmoye Lassies and Sporting Paddy"
2. "The Banks of the Roses"
3. "The Black Velvet Band"
4. "The Foggy Dew"
5. "The Town I Loved So Well"
6. "The Showman's Fancy/The Wonder Hornpipe/The Swallow's Tail"
7. "The Sick Note"
8. "The Manchester Rambler"
9. "Job of Journeywork/The Cork Hornpipe"
10. "The Maid Behind the Bar/The Boyne Hunt/The Shaskeen Reel/The Mason's Apron"

=== Disc Two ===
1. "Kelly the Boy from Killane"
2. "The Fields of Athenry"
3. "Step It Out Mary"
4. "Chief O'Neill's Hornpipe/Ryan's Hornpipe/The Mullingar Races"
5. "South Australia"
6. "Dirty Old Town"
7. "Among Friends"
8. "Drag That Fiddle"
9. "Whiskey in the Jar"
10. "The Wild Rover"
11. "Molly Malone"

== Mislabelled instrumental tracks ==
The tune labelled "Fairmoye Lassies" is generally spelled "Fermoy Lasses" (O'Neill 573). "Chief O'Neill's Hornpipe" is more commonly known as "Chief O'Neill's Favourite (O'Neill 806), from O'Neill's Dance Music of Ireland.

== Personnel ==
- Eamonn Campbell – acoustic guitar, mandolin, vocals
- Seán Cannon – vocals, acoustic guitar
- Barney McKenna – Tenor banjo, vocals
- Paddy Reilly – vocals, acoustic guitar
- John Sheahan – fiddle, tin whistle
