= London Recruits =

2012 book edited by Ken Keable

London Recruits: The Secret War Against Apartheid
- Author: Ken Keable
- Language: English
- Subject: Apartheid South Africa
- Published: Pontypool
- Publisher: Merlin Press
- Publication date: 2012
- Publication place: United Kingdom
- Media type: Print
- Pages: 348
- ISBN: 9780850366556
- Dewey Decimal: 323.168

London Recruits: The Secret War Against Apartheid is a 2012 book edited and compiled by Ken Keable, with an introduction by Ronnie Kasrils and a foreword by Pallo Jordan. It inspired a documentary film, London Recruits, directed by Gordon Main.

== Synopsis ==
The book details the secret activities of foreign volunteers, especially from the United Kingdom and the rest of Western Europe, who worked covertly to assist the African National Congress during apartheid. Ronnie Kasrils, a South African young communist, met with George Bridges, London Secretary of the Young Communist League in 1967 and began the process of reviving the ANC presence in South Africa through propaganda. These volunteers were mostly young communists, socialists and Trotskyists. The book reveals work done by volunteers, such as the transport of anti-apartheid leaflets and cassettes from London to counter the South African government's own overseas propaganda machine. A number of the activists were students at the London School of Economics and Political Science, including Ronnie Kasrils. Ronnie Kasrils subsequently became a leader of the armed struggle and a minister in Mandela's cabinet.

== Reception ==
In the Buffalo News the book was described as a series of "revealing, firsthand accounts" and was reviewed in the International Review of Social History from Cambridge University. The first film made about the Recruits was made by Disobedient Films' Leah Borromeo and Katharine Round for an exhibition called Disobedient Objects at the V&A Museum in London while a talk on the book was held at the Bishopsgate Institute. A documentary film of the book was released in 2024.
