= Christ Church, Timperley =

Coordinates: 53.3902°N 2.3159°W

Christ Church
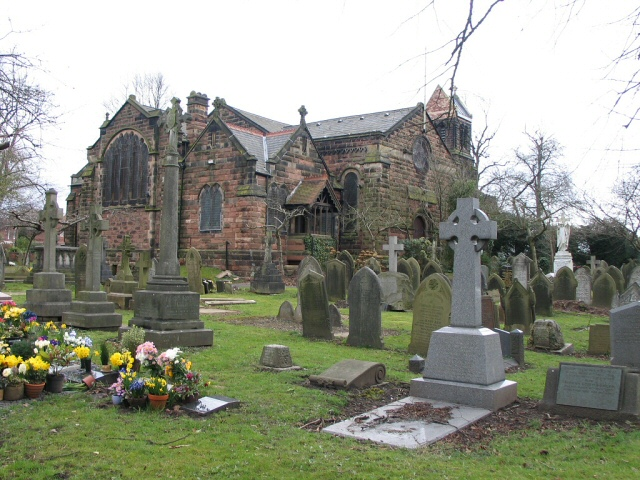

- Location in Greater Manchester
- OS grid reference: SJ 79026 88181
- Location: Timperley, Altrincham, Greater Manchester
- Country: England
- Denomination: Anglican
- Website: Christ Church, Timperley

History
- Status: Parish church

Architecture
- Functional status: Active
- Architectural type: Church
- Completed: 1849

Administration
- Province: York
- Diocese: Chester
- Archdeaconry: Macclesfield
- Deanery: Bowdon
- Parish: Timperley

Clergy
- Vicar: Revd Stephen Dunton

Christ Church is a Church of England church in the village of Timperley near Altrincham, Greater Manchester, England. It is recorded in the National Heritage List for England (NHLE) as a designated Grade II listed building. It is an active Anglican parish church in the Diocese of Chester, the archdeaconry of Macclesfield and the deanery of Bowdon.
