= Benny Rothman =

British left-wing political activist (1911–2002)

- Born: Bernard Rothman; 1 June 1911; Cheetham Hill, Manchester
- Died: 23 January 2002 (aged 90)
- Known for: Political activist Mass trespass of Kinder Scout
- Political party: Communist Party of Great Britain

Bernard "Benny" Rothman (1 June 1911 – 23 January 2002) was a British political activist. He is known for organizing the mass trespass of Kinder Scout in 1932, which led to the establishment of the National Parks and Access to the Countryside Act 1949.

== Biography ==
Rothman was born in Cheetham Hill, Manchester, into a Jewish family from Romania, who arrived to Britain in the early 1900s. Due to the poor financial situation of the family, Rothman had to leave school at the age of 14 and start work as an errand boy in the motor trade, despite receiving a scholarship to Central High School for Boys (now Manchester Academy).

He became a trainee mechanic and studied geography and economics at the YMCA in his spare time. In 1929, he attended a meeting of the Young Communist League, invited by a coworker.

Increasingly committed to the causes of socialism and communism, Rothman lost his job and was arrested after promoting his sales of the Daily Worker by chalking on the pavement, which received attention from the press.

While unemployed, with the help of a bicycle salvaged from spare parts, Rothman discovered the nearby wilderness regions of the Peak District and North Wales, ascending Mount Snowdon alone. In 1931, he helped organize a chapter of the British Workers' Sports Federation.

The combination of his political activism and interest in the outdoors led him organizing the mass trespass of Kinder Scout in 1932, resulting in his arrest and further employment difficulties.

In 1933 and 1934, he worked at a garage. In 1934, Rothman began working at an aircraft factory owned by Avro in Newton Heath and instantly became an officer of the Amalgamated Engineering Union (AEU). His political views became increasingly visible to his employer and he was fired. Rothman was active in working with Jewish groups in Manchester to oppose the campaigns of Oswald Mosley's British Union of Fascists.

In 1936, he started work at Metropolitan-Vickers at Trafford Park and was again soon an AEU official.

Rothman ran for the council of the Municipal Borough of Altrincham as a member of the Communist Party of Great Britain in the elections of 1966, 1967, 1968, 1969, and 1970. He received only a minimal number of votes.

In 1979, he campaigned against the Tory countryside legislation, led by Margaret Thatcher.

== Personal life ==
Rothman was five feet tall. His wife, Lily Crabtree, a fellow communist whom he met while working at Avro, pre-deceased him. He had a daughter and a son. He lived in Timperley. He died in 2002 from a stroke.

In 2012, a plaque was installed at his former home in Timperley honouring his contributions to the establishment of national parks.

== Bibliography ==
- Rothman, B. (1982) 1932 Kinder Trespass: Personal View of the Kinder Scout Mass Trespass ISBN 0-9506043-7-2
