= Mass trespass of Kinder Scout =

1932 protest in the UK

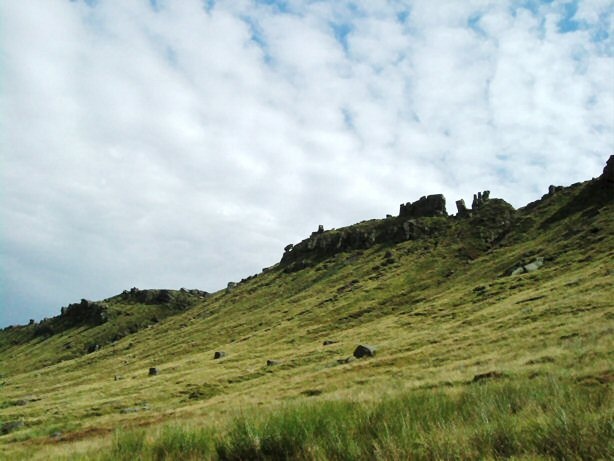
- Date: 24 April 1932; 94 years ago
- Location: Kinder Scout
- Result: Increase in both public awareness and support for the ramblers.; Six trespassers arrested for related offences; five convicted.

Parties
Young Communist League (Great Britain); Communist Party of Great Britain	Gamekeepers for wealthy landowners British government

Lead figures
Benny Rothman; Ewan MacColl	Ramsay Macdonald

The mass trespass of Kinder Scout was a trespass protest at Kinder Scout in the Peak District, Derbyshire, England, on 24 April 1932. The protest sought to highlight that walkers were denied access to areas of open countryside which had been fenced off by wealthy landowners who forbade public access. It was organised by communist leader and Jewish anti-fascist Benny Rothman, the secretary of the British Workers' Sports Federation and a member of the Young Communist League.

Although the mass trespass was a controversial strategy at the time, the imprisonment of some of the trespassers led to public outrage, which increased public support for open access land. Some of the trespassers went on to become successful activists and politicians, and some later died fighting for the Republicans in the Spanish Civil War.

Many details of the event such as the exact turnout of protesters, whether the trespass helped the cause of public access in the immediate aftermath of the event, and even whether some of the trespassers ever made it to the summit, have been heavily debated by historians.

== Background ==
In the early 1800s the moorland of Kinder Scout was a popular area for hikers (known as ramblers) to visit and enjoy the natural beauty of the area. However, wealthy landowners began to guard the land zealously, forcefully evicting members of the public, leading to Kinder Scout being nicknamed "forbidden Kinder". All legal attempts to open the land failed as the landowners were unwilling to compromise, and landowners began attacking members of the public with dogs. Without any evidence, the landowners claimed that hikers disturbed grouse bird nesting, which the landowners sought to profit from.

During the 1930s, there was increasing pressure for greater public freedom to access mountains and moorlands as members of the public sought to escape the grim conditions of towns and cities. There was also a massive increase in sports clubs led by Marxist political activists, who opposed the private ownership of large areas of countryside. Frustrated by the lack of progress achieved through lobbying parliament to grant the public free access to the countryside, some activists took to trespassing on privately owned countryside as a form of protest against wealthy landowners.

== The event ==
The 1932 trespass was a coordinated protest involving three groups of walkers who approached Kinder Scout from different directions at the same time. Accounts of the numbers involved vary widely: a Times article at the time reported that it was about 100, Benny Rothman claimed it was between 600 and 800, and poet and folk singer Ewan MacColl, who participated in the walk and wrote a song sung by the walkers, remembered it as over 3,000. The generally accepted figure is that reported by the Manchester Guardian at the time, of an estimated 400 people. The trespassers began at Bowden Bridge quarry near Hayfield. They proceeded via William Clough to the plateau of Kinder Scout, where there were violent scuffles with gamekeepers. The ramblers were able to reach their destination and meet with another group at Ashop Head. On the return, five ramblers were arrested, with another detained earlier. They were put on trial at the Derby Assizes in July. One was acquitted; one was convicted of causing bodily harm and sentenced to six months in prison; the remainder received sentences of between two and four months for incitement to cause riotous assembly.

== Political effects ==
According to the Hayfield Kinder Trespass Group website, this act of civil disobedience was one of the most successful in British history. It arguably led to the passage of the National Parks legislation in 1949 and helped pave way for the establishment of the Pennine Way and other long-distance footpaths. Walkers' rights to travel through common land and uncultivated upland were eventually protected by the Countryside and Rights of Way Act (CROW Act) of 2000. Though controversial when it occurred, it has been interpreted as the embodiment of "working class struggle for the right to roam versus the rights of the wealthy to have exclusive use of moorlands for grouse shooting."

The Kinder mass trespass was one of a number of protests at the time seeking greater access to the moorlands of the northern Peak District. What set it apart from the others was it marked a new and more radical approach to the problem which was not universally popular with rambling groups. The harshness of the sentences imposed on the leaders of the protest was headline news in local and national newspapers, resulting in the issue gaining public attention and sympathy. The subsequent access rally staged in Winnats Pass attracted 10,000 people to attend in support of greater access to the adjacent moorland.

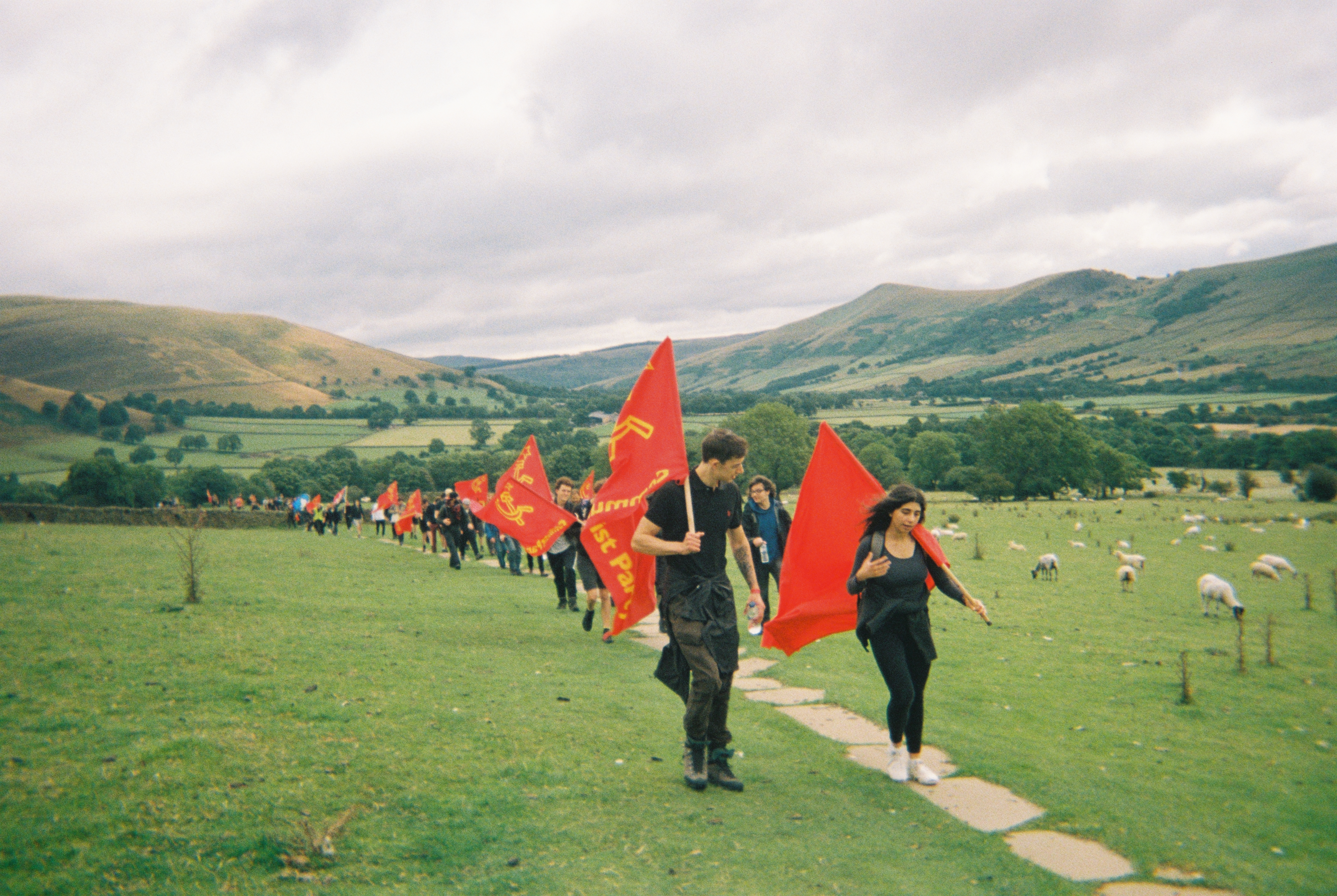
Activists from the Young Communist League (Great Britain) in 2021 marking the mass trespass of Kinder Scout

An unintended consequence of the mass trespass was greater interest being paid to ramblers' behaviour and potential ways to regulate it. This resulted in a 'Code of Courtesy for the Countryside' being produced, which was a forerunner of the modern Countryside Code.

== Revisionism ==
A number of writers have criticised the narrative of the success of the Kinder Scout trespass. In 2011, historian David Hey questioned the narrative of the Kinder Scout trespass as "a simple explanation of the triumph of the 'right to roam' movement". According to Hey, the trespass on balance did "more harm than good". In 2002, Philip Day of the Manchester Ramblers' Federation stated the trespass was commonly used by opponents of the access movement as an argument for denying access even into the 1950s and 1960s, bringing a "positive hindrance" to the efforts of the movement. In 1989, walkers' rights activist Tom Stephenson challenged the assertion that the trespassers had reached the summit of Kinder Scout, saying they made it only as far as Ashop Head. In 2013, historian John K. Walton questioned the absolutism of this revisionism. He advocated a post-revisionist stance on the mass trespass, acknowledging its positive effects both in the short and long term. He pointed to its symbolic role in the access campaign over the rest of the century that led to the CROW Act.

== Commemoration ==
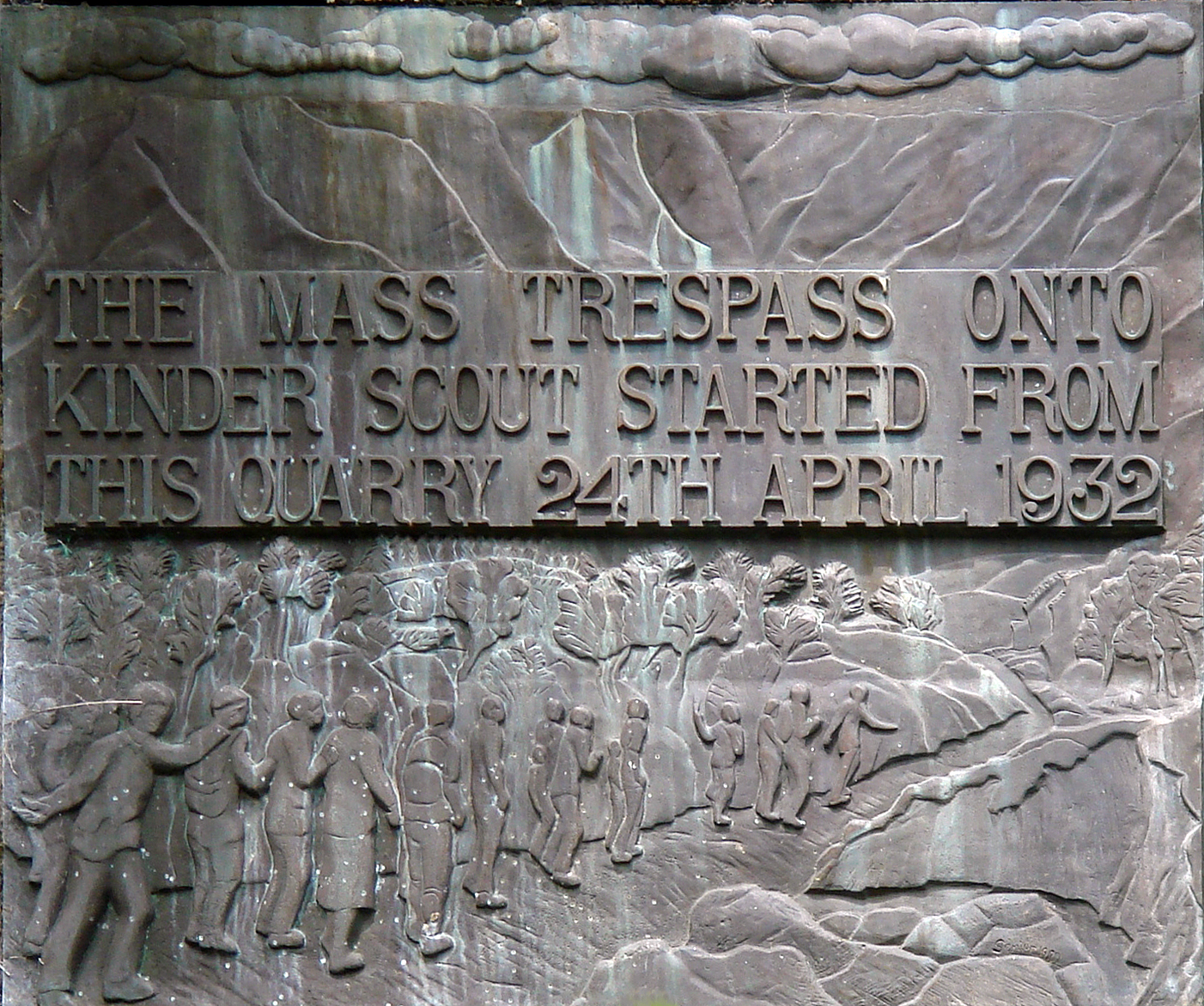
Commemorative plaque at Bowden Bridge Quarry, unveiled in 1982

Ewan MacColl (then known by his birth name, Jimmie Miller) commemorated these events in his 1932 song "The Manchester Rambler". The events form the subject of the song "You Can (Mass Trespass, 1932)" on Chumbawamba's 2005 album A Singsong and a Scrap and inspiration for "Walking in the Footsteps of Giants" by northern folk band Harp and a Monkey.

Each year, a combination of wardens and rangers from both The National Trust and the Peak District National Park Authority hold a walking event to mark the anniversary of the trespass. A commemorative plaque marks the start of the trespass at Bowden Bridge quarry near Hayfield, now a popular area for ramblers. It was unveiled in April 1982 by Benny Rothman (then aged 70) during a rally to mark the 50th anniversary.

The Young Communist League hikes up Kinder Scout every year on their annual Communist Summer Camp to commemorate their involvement in the trespass.

== See also ==
- Fell running
- Freedom to roam
- G. H. B. Ward
- Open Country
