= Young Communist League (Great Britain) =

Communist youth organisation in Great Britain

- Motto(s): "Peace, Jobs, and Socialism"
- Chairperson: Maise Riley
- General Secretary: Georgina Andrews
- Founded: 20–26 August 1921; 105 years ago
- Merger of: Young Workers' League; International Communist Schools Movement
- Headquarters: Ruskin House, Croydon, London, England
- Membership: 500 (2023)
- Ideology: Communism; Marxism–Leninism
- Mother party: Communist Party of Great Britain (1921–1991); Communist Party of Britain (since 1991)
- International affiliation: World Federation of Democratic Youth; International Peoples' Assembly; Meeting of European Communist Youth Organisations (MECYO)
- Magazine: Challenge
- Website: ycl.org.uk

The Young Communist League (YCL) is the youth section of the Communist Party of Britain. Although its headquarters is based in London, the YCL has active branches across England, Scotland, and Wales. Aside from sports and social programs, the YCL heavily focuses on publishing political literature, with its own political journal called Challenge.

Originally founded in 1921 as a merger between two existing youth movements, the YCL was the youth section of the Communist Party of Great Britain (CPGB) until 1991 when the CPGB dissolved. It then reorganised as the youth section of the newly founded Communist Party of Britain, which still exists today. During the 1920s and 1930s much of the YCL's activities focused on sports as a recruitment and organising tool for socialist causes. In 1932 its members led the Mass trespass of Kinder Scout to protest against land enclosures. Many of its members fought against fascism in the Spanish Civil War (1936-1939), with notable examples including John Cornford and Charlie Hutchison. During the Vietnam War the YCL led a successful campaign to raise large amounts of supplies to be donated to the Viet Cong, and during the 1970s undertook missions to resist Apartheid in South Africa by supplying personnel for the London Recruits. During the 1980s, the YCL's chairman Mark Ashton, led a successful drive to win working class support for LGBT causes in Britain after founding the Lesbians and Gays Support the Miners alliance.

Today much of the YCL's activities revolve around issues such as trade unionism, anti-austerity causes, and climate change.

== Youth section of the Communist Party of Great Britain (1921–1988) ==
=== Establishment ===
In August 1921, two of Great Britain's leading radical youth organisations, the Young Workers' League and the International Communist Schools Movement, gathered at a special conference held at Birmingham. The assembled delegates to this Unity Conference passed a proposal calling for the two standing groups to merge under a new name, that of the Young Communist League. This proposal was taken to the rank-and-file of each group, and the proposed unified constitution and organisational rules ratified in a referendum of branches held in October.

Logo of the Young Communist League as it appeared in 1923.

The YCL was the youth wing of the Communist Party of Great Britain (CPGB), which exercised oversight over the group. The YCL modelled itself upon the adult party and, in the estimation of historian Thomas Linehan, "functioned as a younger version of it." In 1954, the YCL supported 'The Red Scout', Paul Garland, who had been dismissed from his local Scout Group in Bristol following his dual membership. This was a controversy with wide media coverage and a debate in the House of Lords. While formally independent, the group was always closely linked to the CPGB and its activities and fortunes broadly followed those of its parent organisation. As with the adult party, the YCL saw itself as part of a unified world movement, and took its ultimate direction from the Young Communist International (CYI), with headquarters in Moscow.

The YCL was seen as a recruiting school for activists in the adult party, and the organisation's structure, internal relationships, and tactical activities closely paralleled and followed those of the CPGB. This was in turn a reflection of the structure and practise of the Russian Communist Party (later known as the Communist Party of the Soviet Union). Similarly, the Young Communist International, which formally stood at the head of the YCL's decision-making process, was closely modelled upon the adult Communist International, which itself was shaped by Russian Communist Party practice.

The fledgling YCL published its own official monthly periodical, known as The Young Communist; it was replaced by Challenge in 1935, which continues to be published today.

=== 1920s and 1930s ===
In 1923 the YCL founded their Red Sports Clubs, aiming to rival the Boy Scouts and Girl Scouts. The YCL was very successful in using sports to organise young people politically against imperialism and poverty, and by 1932 the British Workers' Sports Federations were dominated by members of the YCL. As a result of their involvement of the BWSF, the Manchester and Sheffield YCL organised the Mass trespass of Kinder Scout.

=== The Spanish Civil War ===
Between 1936 and 1939 over 35,000 men and women, from over 50 countries, left their homes to volunteer for the Republican forces of the Spanish Civil War within the British Battalion. More than 2,300 of these came from Britain, Ireland and the Commonwealth, with as many as 80% being members of the Communist Party of Great Britain and the Young Communist League. The volunteers came from overwhelmingly working-class backgrounds, with large numbers hailing from cities such as London, Manchester, Liverpool and Glasgow. Only a small number were unemployed with large numbers involved in industrial occupations, such as labouring, construction, shipbuilding and mining. The average age for the volunteers from Britain was twenty-nine.

Volunteers included John Cornford; a poet and Young Communist League member from Cambridge who was also the great-grandson of Charles Darwin, and Charlie Hutchison; chair of the Young Communist League branch in Fulham and the only black British volunteer to join the International Brigades.

=== The 1940s and 1970s ===
The YCL was known to have enjoyed close contacts with the London branch of the Caribbean Labour Congress, led by communist activist and pioneer of Black civil rights in Britain, Billy Strachan.

During the 1960s, the Young Communist League actively supported the National Liberation Front (Viet Cong) and the Vietnamese people during the Vietnam War. They supplied large quantities of Blood plasma, as well as collecting funds to buy over one hundred bicycles, many of which were donated to the Vietnamese at the 9th World Festival of Youth and Students in Bulgaria, 1968.

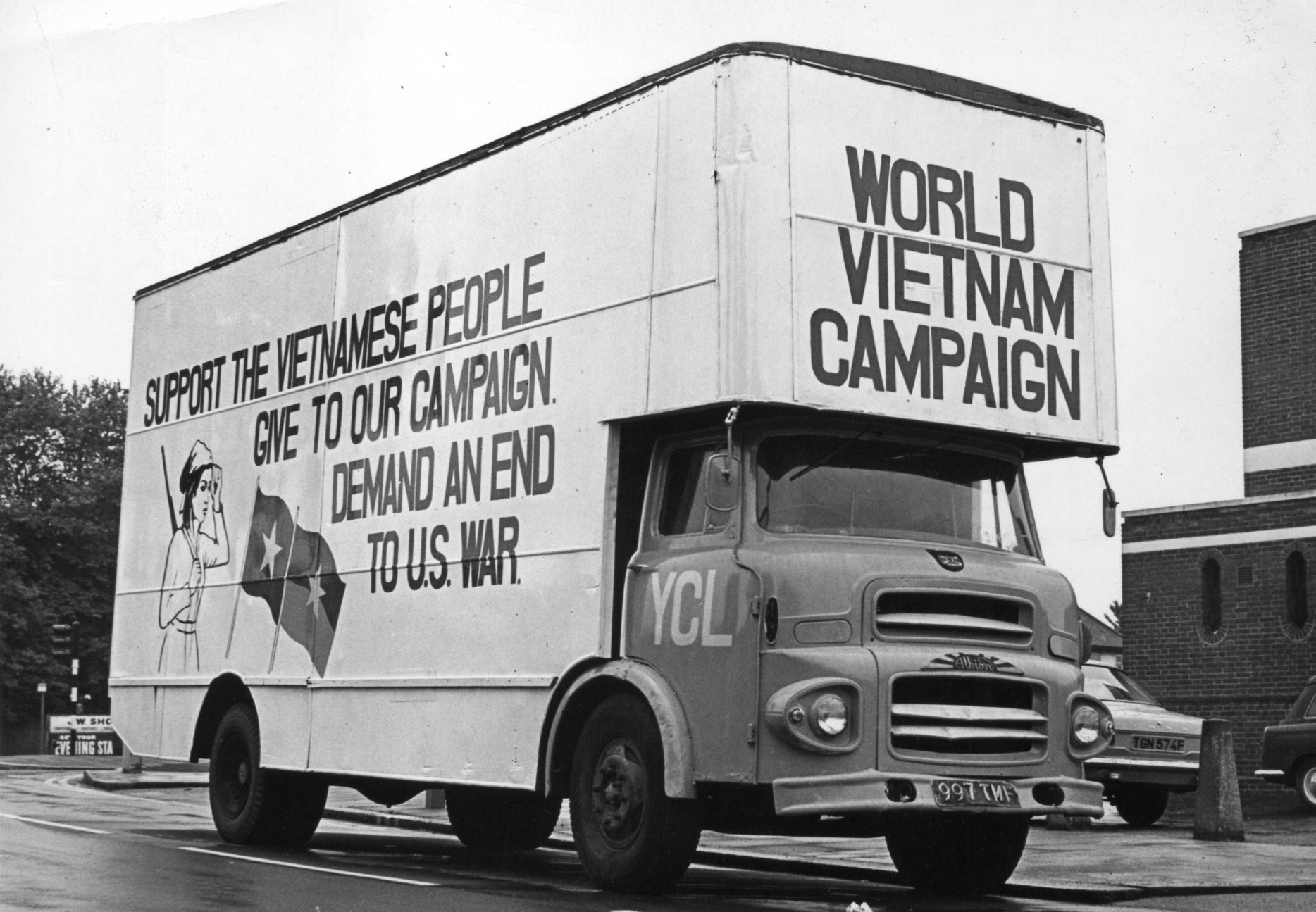
Young Communist League, Vietnam campaign lorry, 1968

A recruitment drive started in 1966 around the slogan "The Trend - Communism" associated the group with wider cultural trends in society; "The Trend" campaign emphasised the power of music in social change (Irish folk singer Luke Kelly was also a member in the 60s). Throughout this period, YCL membership grew to over 6,000 members and a generation of young members, led by Barney Davis (national secretary), George Bridges (London secretary) and others challenged the political approach of the parent party. The League continued engaging in new musical cultures through the late 1970s, as young communists participated in a Camden squat along with the punk band Scritti Politti.

The YCL took a lead in condemning Soviet invasion of Czechoslovakia (calling it such, the Party called it an "intervention" at the time), but the position was only adopted by a 60:40 vote. Some members who favoured a Soviet line, including John Chamberlain (Jack Conrad), left the YCL to join the New Communist Party of Britain in 1977. Chamberlain was to become head of the NCP's youth section; however, shortly after this, he attempted to rejoin the CPGB.

=== The 1970s and 1980s ===
1968 proved the start of a long decline in membership, characterised by competition between different tendencies. The leadership tended to be eurocommunist, but opposition to it was stronger than in the CPGB.

During the early 1970s the Young Communist League supported the African National Congress by supplying volunteers, later known as the London Recruits, for secret missions against South Africa's Apartheid system. Young white members were chosen as they could move freely around South Africa at the time. Due to the Suppression of Communism Act, 1950, people were legally not allowed to hand out ANC leaflets in the street, so devices known as leaflet bombs were set off in a number of different cities and locations, promoting the ANC and letting the African people know that they were still around regardless of the state suppression against them.

In 1979, its congress adopted a new programme, Our Future, which did not verbally commit the group to Marxism and removed the policy of democratic centralism. The new programme exacerbated divisions in the group, and in 1983, with membership down to 510, democratic centralism was re-imposed.

In 1985, Mark Ashton became General Secretary of the YCL, having co-founded Lesbians and Gays Support the Miners to raise funds supporting the National Union of Mineworkers during the year-long strike of 1984–1985. By the end of the strike, eleven different LGSM groups had emerged throughout the UK, with the London group alone raising £22,500 by 1985 (equivalent to £69,000 in 2019) in support. The events of Mark Ashton and LGSM have since been dramatised in the 2014 film Pride.

However membership in the League continued to decline, and by 1986 the league had fewer than 300 members.

== Youth section of the Communist Party of Britain (1991 to present) ==
After the split in the CPGB leading to the creation of the Communist Party of Britain in 1988 (and the dissolution of the CPGB in 1991), the Young Communist League was re-established in 1991, based on the CPB Youth Section, and recommitting itself as a Marxist-Leninist organisation. The YCL is organisationally autonomous to the Communist Party of Britain, deciding its own activities and priorities with its own Congress & resolutions, but is constitutionally committed to support for the CPB's programme, Britain's Road to Socialism which entered its 9th edition in April 2020. The YCL is a member of the World Federation of Democratic Youth (WFDY) and participates in international gatherings, such as the World Festival of Youth and Students.

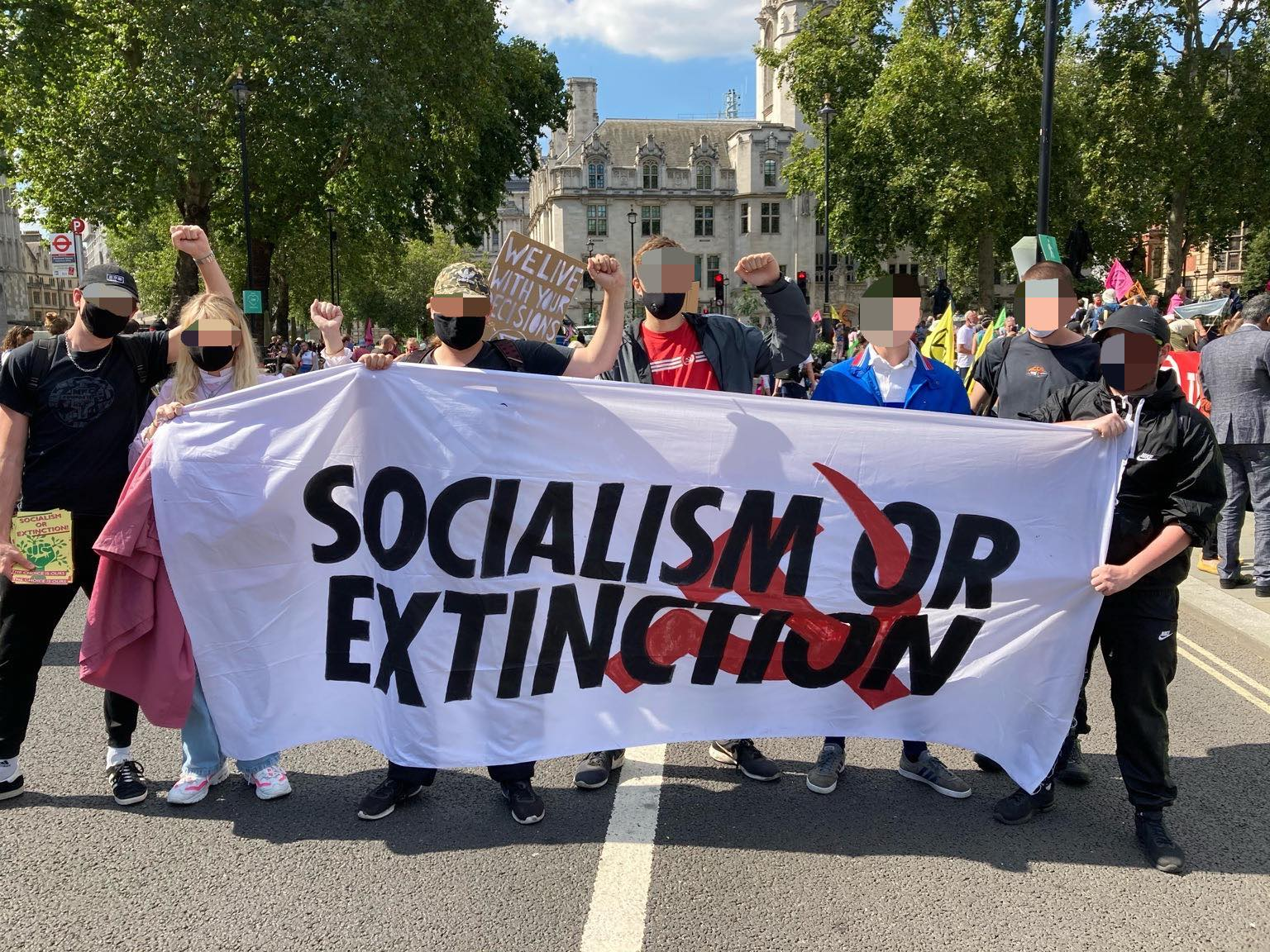
Young Communist League attending an Extinction Rebellion protest in London, September 2020

After a resurge in popularity from 2017, the Young Communist League focuses on community, tenants and trade union work and has seen fast growth, particularly in Scotland. The YCL sees itself as a centre for political education for young people with an organiser describing themselves as "arming young communists with the tools to build themselves up in as many fields as we can".

In September 2020, after environmental protests in London called by Extinction Rebellion, The Telegraph reported that "Extinction Rebellion at war with itself after infiltration by Marxists" and The Times reported that “Extinction Rebellion has allowed a hard core of ideologues and Marxist infiltrators to dictate its agenda”, in relation to the attendance of a Young Communist League block on the demo brandishing a banner declaring "Socialism or Extinction" alongside an image of the hammer and sickle. The Young Communist League responded, stating that: "We refuse to accept any division pushed by the despicable Murdoch press between the socialist left and the ecological movement. If stating the obvious truth that countless rank and file XR groups and members have stated this week, that capitalism itself is unsustainable, makes us "hard left" then we proudly say yes: we are the hard left."

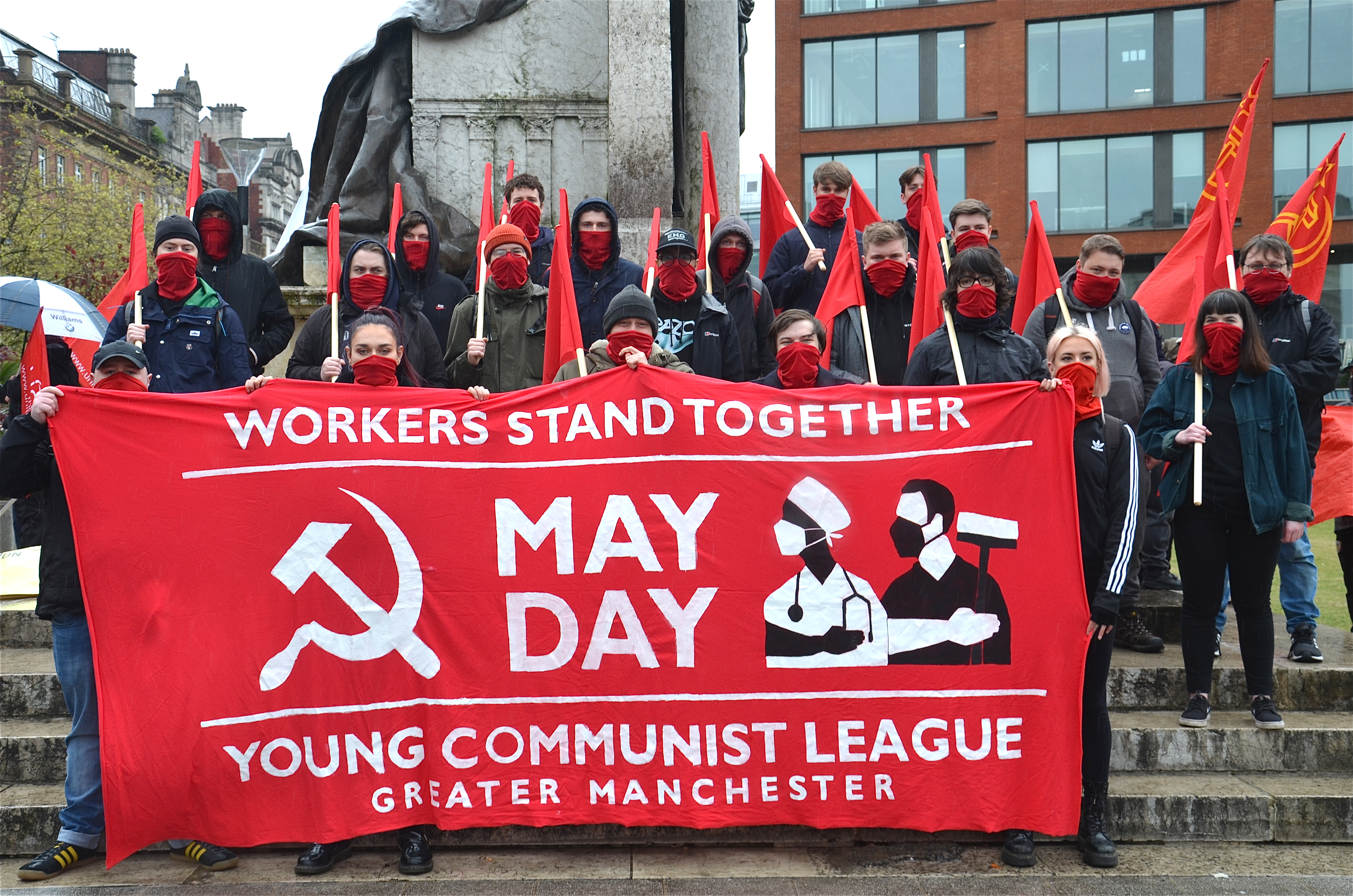
Young Communist League celebrating May Day in Manchester, May 2021

Celebrations began in 2021 as the Young Communist League commemorates 100 years since its original founding in 1921, with the YCL reflecting and drawing attention to its achievements throughout that time from the testimonies of past members, and a rejuvenation of its current organisation leading up to its 50th Congress due to take place in August 2021.

The YCL holds an annual Summer Camp in Edale, to commemorate their involvement in the Mass trespass of Kinder Scout of 1932 led by YCL member Benny Rothman to win access to the countryside for working people for recreation and leisure. The Summer Camp intend to "give young workers from across Britain the opportunity to come together for political education and to socialise and enjoy our natural heritage."

In 2024 the Young Communist League launched a fundraiser for the Democratic Front for the Liberation of Palestine

== Beliefs ==
=== "Socialist Patriotism" as a core to National Identity ===
The Young Communist League has advocated for what it calls "Socialist Patriotism" in its political documents and through individual writers in its political journal Challenge. The Leagues 50th Congress Political Resolution stated that communists should "fight to make socialist patriotism central to national identity", arguing that it is for "Communists, Socialists, and trade unionists to identify, develop, and build in each nation’s culture, and also in the collective legacy of shared struggles between working people in those nations, only the democratic and socialist elements" . The organisation presents this position as distinct from Bourgeois Nationalism and consistent with Socialist-Internationalism.

Supporters along with writers in Challenge Magazine, the YCL's political journal, have described this as a continuation of the Marxist–Leninist tradition of Socialist Patriotism, pointing to passages by Karl Marx and Vladimir Lenin suggesting that workers must first win power in their own countries and engage with the national consciousness of the masses.

=== LGBT+ rights and other views ===
The Young Communist League of Britain supports LGBT+ rights and opposes discrimination based on sexual orientation and gender identity. In its 50th Congress Political Resolution, the organisation described anti-LGBTQ+ views as "another form of discrimination faced by people under the Capitalist system" and advocates for the promotion of LGBTQ+ rights and the right to sexual diversity. It also states that anti-LGBTQ+ discrimination is interconnected with other forms of oppression, stating that the struggle against homophobia and transphobia is linked to wider issues like patriarchal family structures, negative masculinity, womens oppression, and sexual exploitation.

Writers in the YCL's political journal, Challenge magazine, defend that sex is socially significant, while gender is not. They believe that women's oppression under capitalism is rooted in sex based material conditions, while gender is treated as a social construct historically shaped by class society. They reaffirm support for trans rights and healthcare access, but criticise what they describe as "gender ideology", arguing it prioritises subjective identity over material reality and can cause confusion in general organisation wellbeing, political analysis and workplace research.

In regards to trans self-identification, the Communist Party of Britain and the YCL released a joint statement in April 2025 in accordance to the UK Supreme Court ruling in which both organisations declared their opposition to self-identification as a basis for legal sex or access to single-sex spaces for the transgender community.

== Coppice Camp ==
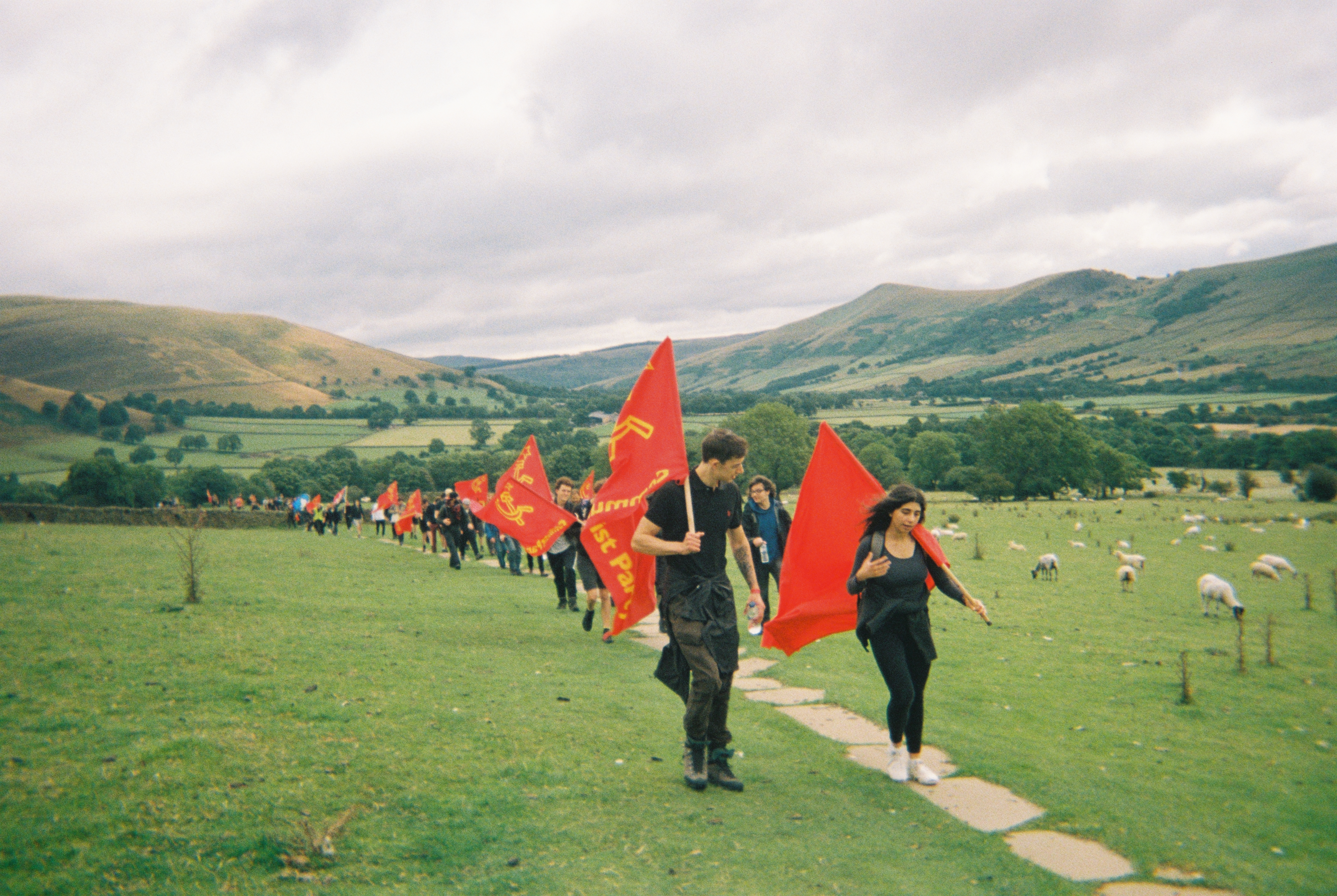
Young communists walking to Kinder Scout (2021)

Following the Fifth YCL Congress in 1928, the league began actively organising cultural events for young people. Regular political work was accompanied by film showings, football games, dances, recreational excursions, as well as a series of summer camps. These summer camps would become a regular feature of life in the league, accompanied by trips out to youth hostels in the winter.

In the 1930s, Carl Cullen bought a plot of land near the village of Kelvedon Hatch, which came to be used by the YCL as a campsite. This plot would later be named 'Coppice Camp', and it was donated to the Communist Party shortly before Cullen died in 1966. As well as summer camps for the YCL, the party made use of the campsite as a venue for weekend schools.

The land for Coppice Camp was sold during the dissolution of the old CPGB; however, the present-day YCL continues to hold summer camps every year in Edale.

== General Secretaries ==
Year	Secretary
1921–1923	Harry Gilbert
1923–1929	William Rust
1929–1935	Wally Tapsell
1935–1941	John Gollan
1941–1946	Ted Willis
1946–1950	Bill Brooks
1950–1958	John Moss
1958–1964	Jimmy Reid
1964–1970	Barney Davis
1970–1979	Tom Bell
1979–1983	Nina Temple
1983–1985	Doug Chalmers
1985–1987	Mark Ashton
1987–1991	Kenny Coyle (Acting)
Refounded YCL
1991–2003	Kenny Coyle
1991–2003	Unknown
2003–2006	Gawain Little
2006–2010	Ben Stevenson
2010–2012	Mick Carty
2012–2014	George Waterhouse
2014–2016	Zoe Hennessey
2016–2018	Owain Holland
2018–2023	Johnnie Hunter
2023–	Georgina Andrews
