= 1963 Altrincham Municipal Borough Council election =

Local election in Cheshire, England

← 1962	9 May 1963	1964 →

8 of 32 seats to Altrincham Municipal Borough Council 16 seats needed for a majority
	First party	Second party	Third party
Party	Conservative	Labour	Liberal
Last election	2 seats, 41.0%	4 seats, 18.7%	3 seats, 40.2%
Seats before	12	9	8
Seats won	2	3	3
Seats after	10	10	9
Seat change	▼2	▲1	▲1
Popular vote	5,330	2,625	4,455
Percentage	42.9%	21.2%	35.9%
Swing	▲1.9%	▲2.5%	▼4.3%
	Fourth party
Party	Independent
Last election	0 seats, 0.0%
Seats before	3
Seats won	0
Seats after	3
Seat change	Steady
Popular vote	0
Percentage	0.0%
Swing	Steady
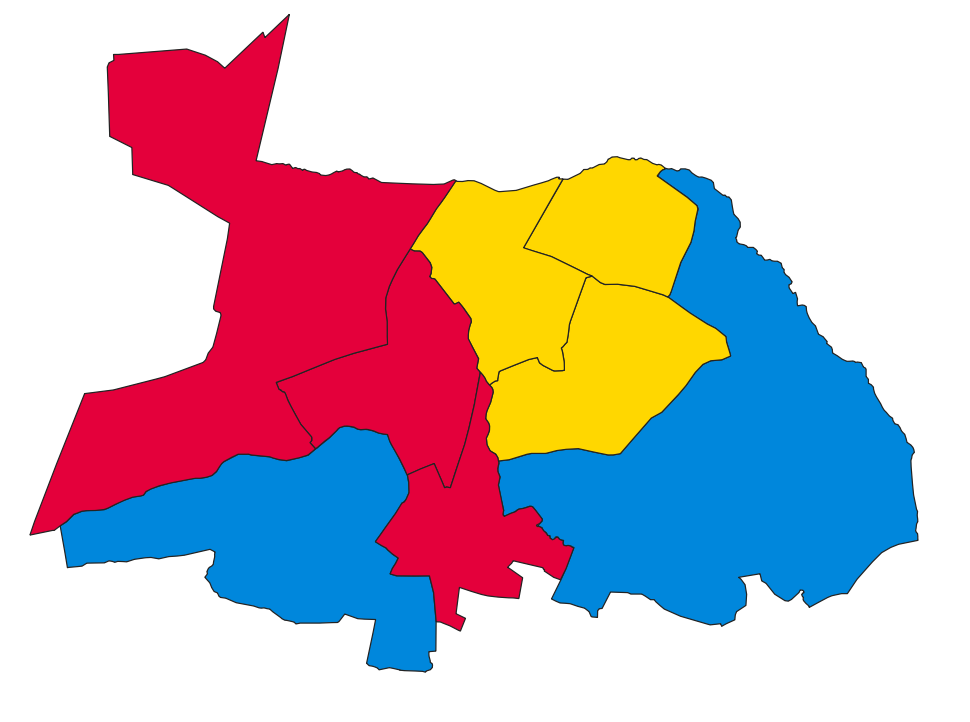
- Map of results of 1963 election
Leader of the Council before election
No overall control
Leader of the Council after election
No overall control

Elections to Altrincham Council were held on Thursday, 9 May 1963. One third of the councillors were up for election, with each successful candidate to serve a three-year term of office. The council remained under no overall control.

== Election result ==
Party	Votes		Seats			Full Council	
Conservative Party	5,330 (42.9%)	▲1.9	2 (25.0%)	2 / 8	▼2	10 (31.3%)	10 / 32
Labour Party	2,625 (21.2%)	▲2.5	3 (37.5%)	3 / 8	▲1	10 (31.3%)	10 / 32
Liberal Party	4,455 (35.9%)	▼4.3	3 (37.5%)	3 / 8	▲1	9 (28.1%)	9 / 32
Independent	0 (0.0%)	Steady	0 (0.0%)	0 / 8	Steady	3 (9.4%)	3 / 32

=== Full council ===
↓
10	9	3	10

=== Aldermen ===
↓
3	5

=== Councillors ===
↓
10	9	5

== Ward results ==
=== Dunham ===
Dunham
Party	Candidate	Votes	%	±%
Labour	W. Yates*	uncontested		
Labour hold		Swing		

=== East Central ===
East Central
Party	Candidate	Votes	%	±%
Labour	C. Livingstone	728	41.4	−15.7
Conservative	T. Barry*	648	36.8	−10.6
Liberal	G. Leak	383	21.8	N/A
Majority		80	4.6	+0.2
Turnout		1,759		
Labour gain from Conservative		Swing		

=== North ===
North
Party	Candidate	Votes	%	±%
Labour	R. Street*	uncontested		
Labour hold		Swing		

=== South West ===
South West
Party	Candidate	Votes	%	±%
Conservative	J. B. Dunn*	778	69.3	+15.9
Liberal	B. L. Preston	345	30.7	−15.9
Majority		433	38.6	+31.8
Turnout		1,123		
Conservative hold		Swing		

=== Timperley (1) ===
Timperley (1)
Party	Candidate	Votes	%	±%
Liberal	N. Schofield*	790	39.5	−25.0
Conservative	F. R. Metcalf	671	33.5	−2.0
Labour	K. G. Dunning	540	27.0	N/A
Majority		119	6.0	−23.0
Turnout		2,001		
Liberal hold		Swing		

=== Timperley (2) ===
Timperley (2)
Party	Candidate	Votes	%	±%
Liberal	K. Gardner*	811	43.7	−8.7
Conservative	J. C. Partridge	771	41.5	+2.1
Labour	P. Hawkshead	275	14.8	+2.9
Majority		40	2.2	−6.0
Turnout		1,857		
Liberal hold		Swing		

=== Timperley (3) ===
Timperley (3)
Party	Candidate	Votes	%	±%
Liberal	S. Williamson	1,287	56.9	−0.2
Conservative	D. Hall	973	43.1	+0.2
Majority		314	13.8	−0.4
Turnout		2,260		
Liberal gain from Conservative		Swing		

=== Timperley (4) ===
Timperley (4)
Party	Candidate	Votes	%	±%
Conservative	K. Jagger*	1,489	43.7	+6.5
Labour	A. Peacock	1,082	31.7	0
Liberal	M. Walker	839	24.6	−10.2
Majority		407	12.0	+9.6
Turnout		3,410		
Conservative hold		Swing		
