= 1964 Altrincham Municipal Borough Council election =

Local election in Cheshire, England

← 1963	7 May 1964	1965 →

8 of 32 seats to Altrincham Municipal Borough Council 16 seats needed for a majority
	First party	Second party	Third party
Party	Conservative	Labour	Liberal
Last election	2 seats, 42.9%	2 seats, 21.2%	3 seats, 35.9%
Seats before	11	11	8
Seats won	3	4	1
Seats after	13	11	6
Seat change	▲2	Steady	▼2
Popular vote	4,454	3,575	4,307
Percentage	36.1%	29.0%	34.9%
Swing	▼6.8%	▲7.8%	▼1.0%
	Fourth party
Party	Independent
Last election	0 seats, 0.0%
Seats before	2
Seats won	0
Seats after	2
Seat change	Steady
Popular vote	0
Percentage	0.0%
Swing	Steady
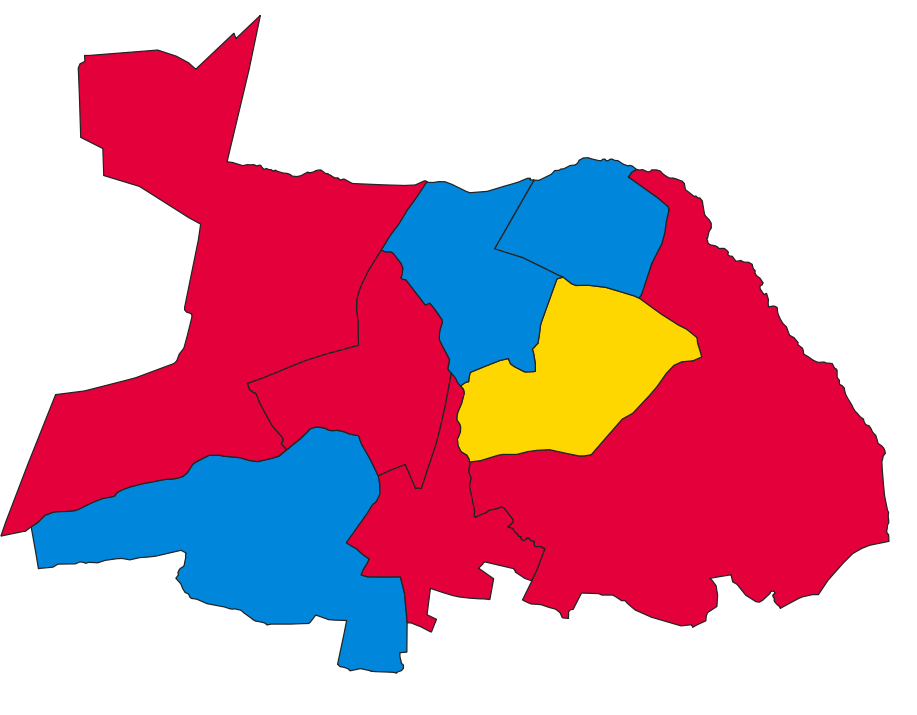
- Map of results of 1964 election
Leader of the Council before election
No overall control
Leader of the Council after election
No overall control

Elections to Altrincham Council were held on Thursday, 7 May 1964. One third of the councillors were up for election, with each successful candidate to serve a three-year term of office. The council remained under no overall control.

== Election result ==
Party	Votes		Seats			Full Council	
Conservative Party	4,454 (36.1%)	▼6.8	3 (37.5%)	3 / 8	▲2	13 (40.6%)	13 / 32
Labour Party	3,575 (29.0%)	▲7.8	4 (50.0%)	4 / 8	Steady	11 (34.4%)	11 / 32
Liberal Party	4,307 (34.9%)	▼1.0	1 (12.5%)	1 / 8	▼2	6 (18.8%)	6 / 32
Independent	0 (0.0%)	Steady	0 (0.0%)	0 / 8	Steady	2 (6.3%)	2 / 32

=== Full council ===
↓
11	6	2	13

=== Aldermen ===
↓
1	2	5

=== Councillors ===
↓
10	6	8

== Ward results ==
=== Dunham ===
Dunham
Party	Candidate	Votes	%	±%
Labour	G. Hoyle*	uncontested		
Labour hold		Swing		

=== East Central ===
East Central
Party	Candidate	Votes	%	±%
Labour	A. Peacock	545	41.3	0
Conservative	S. T. Jenkinson	543	41.1	+4.3
Liberal	G. Leak	230	17.5	−4.3
Majority		2	0.2	−4.4
Turnout		1,318		
Labour hold		Swing		

=== North ===
North
Party	Candidate	Votes	%	±%
Labour	G. Harmer*	756	56.3	N/A
Liberal	R. J. Waddington	587	43.7	N/A
Majority		169	12.6	
Turnout		1,343		
Labour hold		Swing		

=== South West ===
South West
Party	Candidate	Votes	%	±%
Conservative	C. J. Jones	738	52.4	−16.9
Liberal	J. D. Carter	671	47.6	+16.9
Majority		67	4.8	−33.8
Turnout		1,409		
Conservative hold		Swing		

=== Timperley (1) ===
Timperley (1)
Party	Candidate	Votes	%	±%
Conservative	W. A. Cragg	749	38.1	+4.6
Labour	K. G. Dunning	633	32.2	+5.2
Liberal	F. Aldhouse*	586	29.8	−9.7
Majority		116	5.9	
Turnout		1,968		
Conservative gain from Liberal		Swing		

=== Timperley (2) ===
Timperley (2)
Party	Candidate	Votes	%	±%
Conservative	J. C. Partridge	739	44.0	+0.3
Liberal	R. G. Sharp	683	40.8	−2.9
Labour	D. Gill	254	15.2	+0.4
Majority		56	3.3	
Turnout		1,676		
Conservative gain from Liberal		Swing		

=== Timperley (3) ===
Timperley (3)
Party	Candidate	Votes	%	±%
Liberal	D. Harper*	1,087	61.6	+4.7
Conservative	F. J. Tansey	679	38.4	−4.7
Majority		408	23.2	+9.4
Turnout		1,766		
Liberal hold		Swing		

=== Timperley (4) ===
Timperley (4)
Party	Candidate	Votes	%	±%
Labour	H. Wharton*	1,387	48.6	+16.9
Conservative	R. H. Alcock	1,006	35.2	−8.5
Liberal	G. D. Whitworth	463	16.2	−8.4
Majority		381	13.4	
Turnout		2,856		
Labour hold		Swing		
