= 1960 Altrincham Municipal Borough Council election =

Local election in Cheshire, England

← 1959	12 May 1960	1961 →

9 of 32 seats to Altrincham Municipal Borough Council 16 seats needed for a majority
	First party	Second party	Third party
Party	Conservative	Labour	Independent
Last election	4 seats, 49.5%	3 seats, 29.8%	0 seats, 0.0%
Seats before	18	8	4
Seats won	6	2	0
Seats after	17	8	4
Seat change	▼1	Steady	Steady
Popular vote	7,074	3,170	608
Percentage	51.0%	22.9%	4.4%
Swing	▲1.5%	▼6.9%	▲4.4
	Fourth party
Party	Liberal
Last election	1 seats, 20.7%
Seats before	2
Seats won	1
Seats after	3
Seat change	▲1
Popular vote	3,006
Percentage	21.7%
Swing	▲1.0%
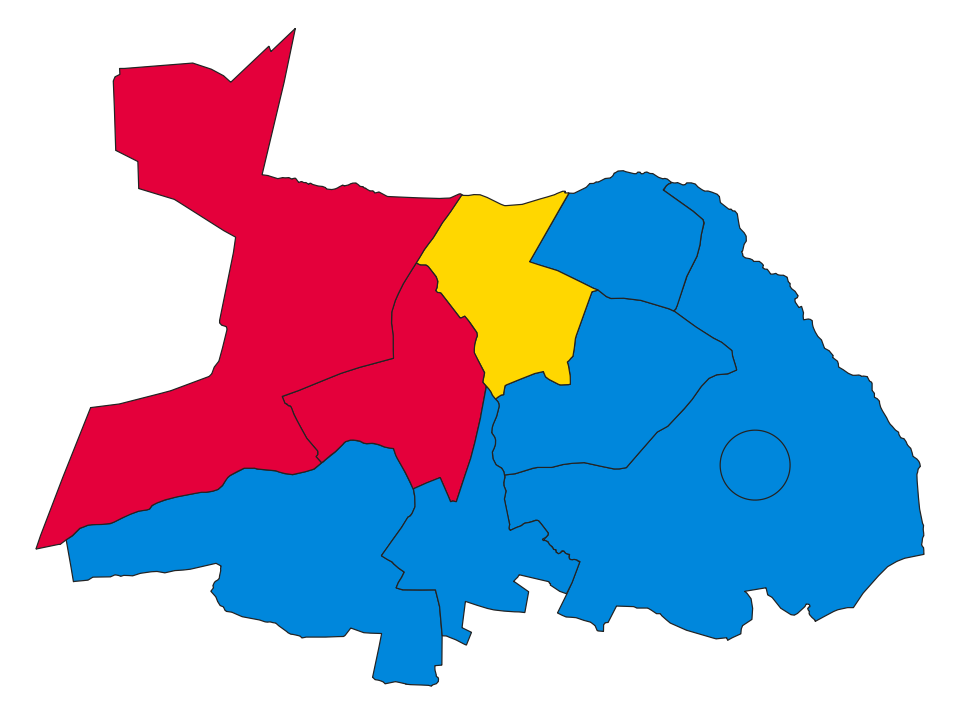
- Map of results of 1960 election
Leader of the Council before election
Conservative
Leader of the Council after election
Conservative

Elections to Altrincham Council were held on Thursday, 12 May 1960. One third of the councillors were up for election, with each successful candidate to serve a three-year term of office. The Conservative Party retained overall control of the council.

== Election result ==
Party	Votes		Seats			Full Council	
Conservative Party	7,074 (51.0%)	▲1.5	6 (66.7%)	6 / 9	Steady	17 (53.1%)	17 / 32
Labour Party	3,170 (22.9%)	▼6.9	2 (22.2%)	2 / 9	Steady	8 (25.0%)	8 / 32
Independent	608 (4.4%)	▲4.4	0 (0.0%)	0 / 9	Steady	4 (12.5%)	4 / 32
Liberal Party	3,009 (21.7%)	▲1.0	1 (11.1%)	1 / 9	▲1	3 (9.4%)	3 / 32

=== Full council ===
↓
8	3	4	17

=== Aldermen ===
↓
4	4

=== Councillors ===
↓
8	3	13

== Ward results ==
=== Dunham ===
Dunham
Party	Candidate	Votes	%	±%
Labour	W. Yates*	uncontested		
Labour hold		Swing		

=== East Central ===
East Central
Party	Candidate	Votes	%	±%
Conservative	T. Barry	930	60.5	+10.6
Independent	W. Murphy	608	39.5	N/A
Majority		322	21.0	
Turnout		1,538		
Conservative hold		Swing		

=== North ===
North
Party	Candidate	Votes	%	±%
Labour	R. Street*	843	53.9	−3.0
Conservative	P. Oliver	720	46.1	+3.0
Majority		123	7.8	−6.0
Turnout		1,563		
Labour hold		Swing		

=== South West ===
South West
Party	Candidate	Votes	%	±%
Conservative	J. B. Dunn	uncontested		
Conservative hold		Swing		

=== Timperley (1) ===
Timperley (1)
Party	Candidate	Votes	%	±%
Liberal	N. Schofield	905	55.8	−1.0
Conservative	L. W. Adkin	716	44.2	+1.0
Majority		189	11.7	−2.0
Turnout		1,621		
Liberal gain from Conservative		Swing		

=== Timperley (2) ===
Timperley (2)
Party	Candidate	Votes	%	±%
Conservative	R. M. Kelsall*	985	51.7	+7.0
Liberal	A. Gibbon	638	33.5	−8.2
Labour	B. Culkingworth	282	14.8	+1.2
Majority		347	18.2	+15.2
Turnout		1,905		
Conservative hold		Swing		

=== Timperley (3) ===
Timperley (3)
Party	Candidate	Votes	%	±%
Conservative	L. R. Wilson*	922	50.1	−1.1
Liberal	D. Harper	920	49.9	+1.1
Majority		2	0.2	−2.2
Turnout		1,842		
Conservative hold		Swing		

=== Timperley (4) ===
Timperley (4) (2 vacancies)
Party	Candidate	Votes	%	±%
Conservative	K. Jagger	1,463	27.1	
Conservative	W. Glenfield	1,338	24.8	
Labour	E. Richardson	1,039	19.3	
Labour	C. Mack	1,006	18.7	
Liberal	P. Tinker	546	10.1	
Majority		299	5.5	
Turnout		5,392		
Conservative hold		Swing		
Conservative hold		Swing		
