= 1946 Altrincham Municipal Borough Council election =

Local election in Cheshire, England

← 1945	1 November 1946	1947 →

8 of 28 seats to Altrincham Municipal Borough Council 14 seats needed for a majority
	First party	Second party
Party	Independent	Labour
Last election	7 seats, 57.1%	2 seats, 42.9%
Seats before	22	6
Seats won	7	1
Seats after	23	5
Seat change	▲1	▼1
Popular vote	8,646	5,824
Percentage	53.2%	35.8%
Swing	▼3.9%	▼7.1%
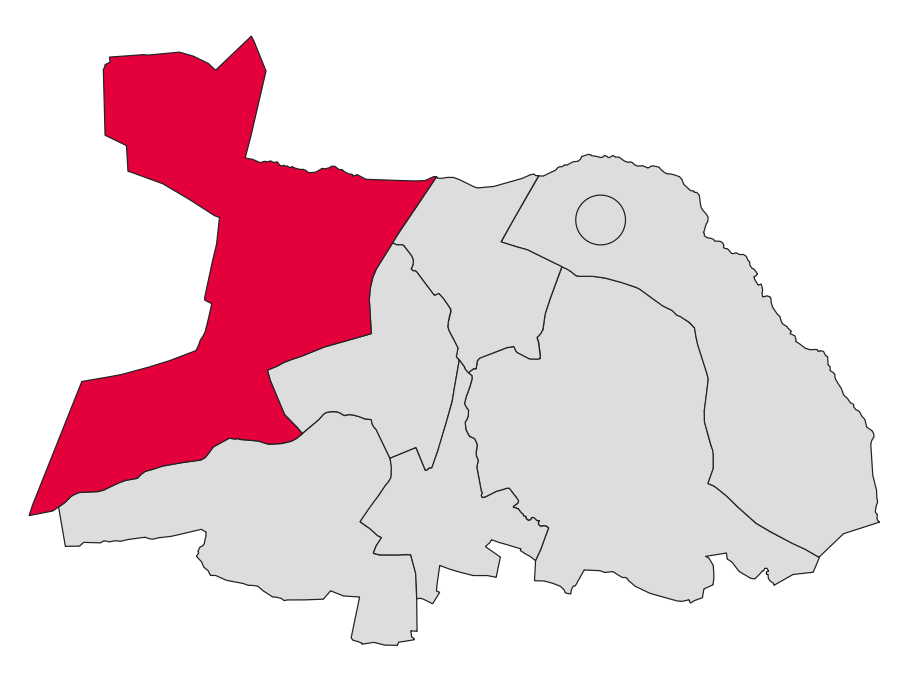
- Map of results of 1946 election
Leader of the Council before election
Independent
Leader of the Council after election
Independent

Elections to Altrincham Council were held on Friday, 1 November 1946. One third of the councillors were up for election, with each successful candidate to serve a three-year term of office. It was the first time that the Liberal Party and an independent conservative stood for election to Altrincham Council. Independents retained overall control of the council.

== Election result ==
Party	Votes		Seats			Full Council	
Independent	8,646 (53.2%)	▼3.9	7 (87.5%)	7 / 8	▲1	23 (82.1%)	23 / 28
Labour Party	5,824 (35.8%)	▼7.1	1 (12.5%)	1 / 8	▼1	5 (17.9%)	5 / 28
Independent Conservative	828 (5.1%)	N/A	0 (0.0%)	0 / 8	N/A	0 (0.0%)	0 / 28
Liberal Party	757 (4.7%)	N/A	0 (0.0%)	0 / 8	N/A	0 (0.0%)	0 / 28
Communist Party	198 (1.2%)	N/A	0 (0.0%)	0 / 8	N/A	0 (0.0%)	0 / 28

=== Full council ===
↓
5	23

=== Aldermen ===
↓
2	5

=== Councillors ===
↓
3	18

== Ward results ==
=== Dunham ===
Dunham
Party	Candidate	Votes	%	±%
Labour	A. Vesey*	1,163	64.8	
Independent	N. Boden	633	35.2	
Majority		530	29.5	
Turnout		1,796		
Labour hold		Swing		

=== East Central ===
East Central
Party	Candidate	Votes	%	±%
Independent	A. Whitley*	1,250	75.0	+17.5
Labour	S. G. Marshall	416	25.0	−17.5
Majority		834	50.0	+35.0
Turnout		1,666		
Independent hold		Swing		

=== North ===
North
Party	Candidate	Votes	%	±%
Independent	H. Cowsill	839	49.9	
Labour	H. Keay*	645	38.3	
Communist	E. Sheldon	198	11.8	
Majority		194	11.5	
Turnout		1,682		
Independent gain from Labour		Swing		

=== South West ===
South West
Party	Candidate	Votes	%	±%
Independent	E. J. Horley	1,246	75.7	+11.8
Labour	D. Norton	400	24.3	−11.8
Majority		846	51.4	+23.6
Turnout		1,646		
Independent hold		Swing		

=== Timperley (1) ===
Timperley (1)
Party	Candidate	Votes	%	±%
Independent	J. L. Warren*	916	54.9	−4.4
Labour	C. Holt	751	45.1	+4.4
Majority		165	9.9	−8.7
Turnout		1,667		
Independent hold		Swing		

=== Timperley (2) ===
Timperley (2) (2 vacancies)
Party	Candidate	Votes	%	±%
Independent	E. Studley	1,284	24.4	
Independent	W. E. Bendell*	953	18.1	
Ind. Conservative	M. Heath	828	15.8	
Labour	A. M. Atherton	769	14.6	
Labour	J. F. Donaldson	666	12.7	
Liberal	A. B. Hamer	408	7.8	
Liberal	P. Fishpool	349	6.6	
Majority		125	2.3	
Turnout		5,257		
Independent hold		Swing		
Independent hold		Swing		

=== Timperley (3) ===
Timperley (3)
Party	Candidate	Votes	%	±%
Independent	H. Howson	1,525	60.1	−4.0
Labour	F. B. Meadowcroft	1,014	39.9	+4.0
Majority		511	20.1	−8.0
Turnout		2,539		
Independent hold		Swing		
