= Didsbury railway station (disambiguation) =

Didsbury railway station may refer to:

- Didsbury railway station, a former station in Didsbury, Greater Manchester, UK
- a Canadian Pacific Railway station in Didsbury, Alberta, Canada
- Didsbury Village tram stop, a stop on the Manchester Metrolink system in Greater Manchester, UK
- East Didsbury railway station, a railway station in Didsbury, Greater Manchester, UK
- East Didsbury tram stop, a stop on the Manchester Metrolink system in Greater Manchester, UK
- West Didsbury tram stop, a stop on the Manchester Metrolink system in Greater Manchester, UK
- Withington and West Didsbury railway station, former station in Greater Manchester, UK
