= Withington railway station =

Withington railway station may refer to:

- Withington railway station (Gloucestershire), former station in Withington, Gloucestershire, England
- Withington railway station (Herefordshire), former station in Withington, Herefordshire, England
- Withington tram stop, a stop on the Manchester Metrolink system in Greater Manchester
- Withington and West Didsbury railway station, former station in Greater Manchester, originally named Withington
