= Withington tram stop =

Manchester Metrolink tram stop

Withington
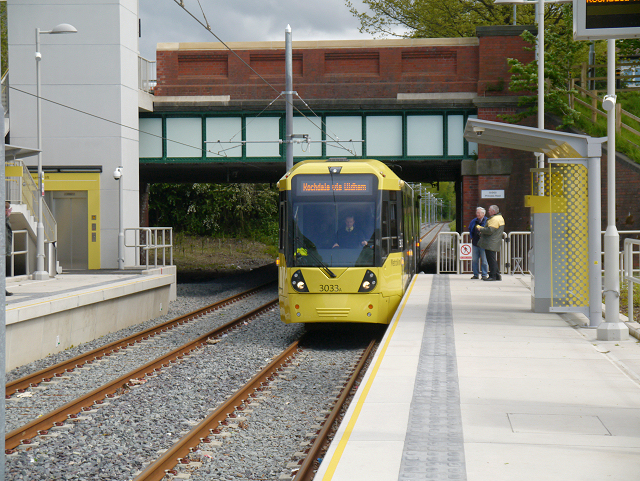

General information
- Location: Withington, Manchester, England
- Coordinates: 53.43284°N 2.24948°W
- Grid reference: SJ833929
- System: Metrolink station
- Line: South Manchester Line
- Platforms: 2

Other information
- Status: In operation
- Fare zone: 3

Key dates
- 23 May 2013: Opened
Route map
Location

Withington tram stop serves the suburb of Withington, in south Manchester, England. It lies on the South Manchester Line of Greater Manchester's light-rail Metrolink system, on the west side of Princess Road.

The tram stop was opened on 23 May 2013, which was built in a cutting on a section of abandoned railway which was reopened for light rail operation. The line was originally opened in 1880 by the Cheshire Lines Committee as the Manchester South District Line, which ran trains from Manchester Central. The line was closed in 1967, but was reopened in the 21st century as part of the Metrolink network. Trams now run from East Didsbury through Withington to Manchester city centre tram stops and on to Rochdale Town Centre.

== History ==
In 1880, the Midland Railway, in partnership with the Cheshire Lines Committee, opened its new Manchester South District Line out of Manchester Central. After Chorlton-cum-Hardy, the line ran south-east through the area with no stations until Withington, on the corner of Lapwing Lane and Palatine Road. Withington station was renamed Withington & Albert Park in 1884 and then Withington & West Didsbury in 1915. Withington & West Didsbury station closed in July 1961, although British Rail trains continued to use this route until 1969, when the entre line was closed as part of the Beeching cuts.

In 1984, Greater Manchester Council and GMPTE announced the Project Light Rail scheme to develop a new light rail/tram system by reopening use of disused railway lines in the region, including the route from Chorlton to East Didsbury. The first phase of the Manchester Metrolink system opened in 1992, but the East Didsbury line was not included.

Funding was limited and reopening the former Midland Line took place in segments. In 2006, it was announced that the Metrolink network would extend as far as St Werburgh's Road and, with funding from the Greater Manchester Transport Fund, extension of the line to East Didsbury was announced in 2008. Tram tracks were laid along the former trackbed and a new intermediate tram stop was constructed by the Princess Road bridge next to Hough End playing fields. Withington Metrolink stop opened on 23 May 2013. Further south along the line, the original Withington railway station was not reopened, but was replaced with a new Metrolink stop, West Didsbury, in close proximity to the old station site.

== Location ==
Withington tram stop is situated on Princess Road in the Hough End area of Manchester, between Withington and Chorlton-cum-Hardy. It serves Hough End playing fields and Southern Cemetery, as well as the residential area to the east of Princess Road.

Despite its name, the tram stop is located approximately 1 mile (1.6 km) from the present-day suburb of Withington. The choice of name has been criticised by local residents, who consider it to be incorrect. The surrounding area was historically considered to be part of Withington. The tram stop lies close to Hough End Hall, the historic seat of Withington Manor in medieval times, but in the 19th century the centre of Withington shifted to its present situation further east. Burton Road and West Didsbury are the closest Metrolink tram stops to Withington itself.

== Service ==
Tram services are scheduled to operate at the following general off-peak frequencies:

- Every 12 minutes to Shaw and Crompton
- Every 12 minutes to Rochdale Town Centre
- Every six minutes to East Didsbury.

Preceding station	Manchester Metrolink	Following station
Burton Road towards East Didsbury	East Didsbury–Rochdale	St Werburgh's Road towards Rochdale Town Centre
Burton Road towards East Didsbury	East Didsbury–Shaw (peak only)	St Werburgh's Road towards Shaw and Crompton

== Gallery ==
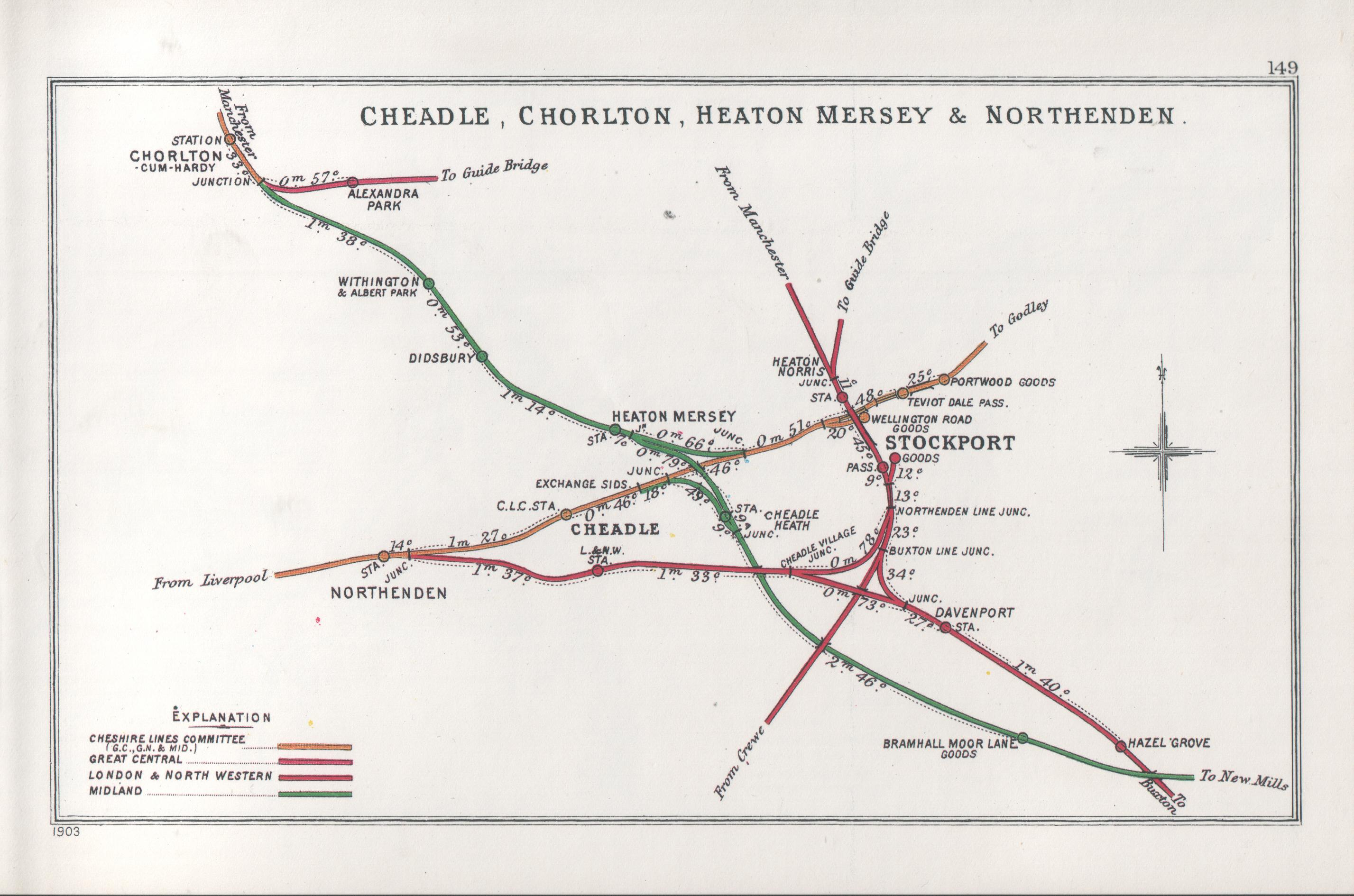
1914 map of South Manchester railways

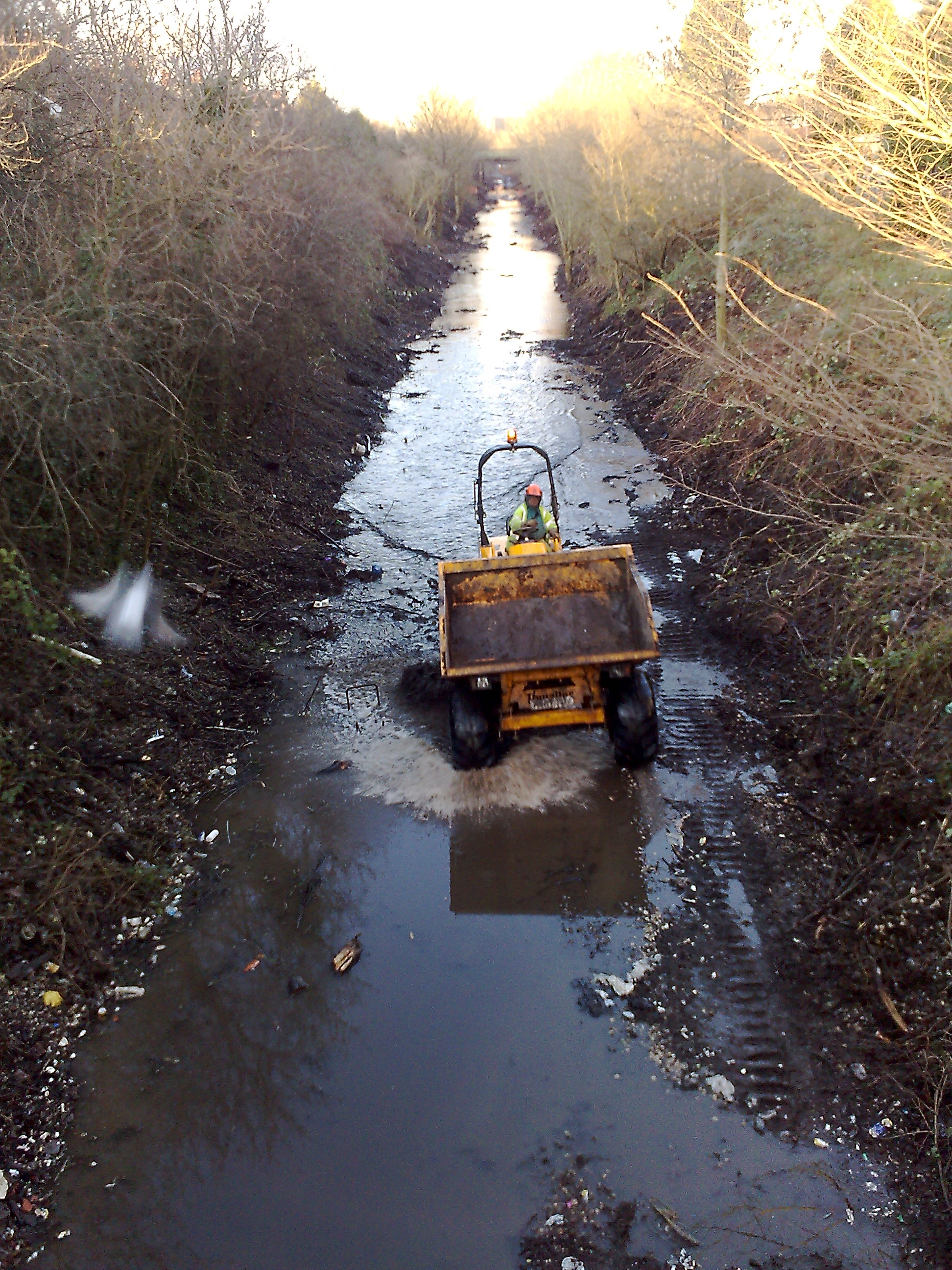
The derelict South Manchester line in 2008

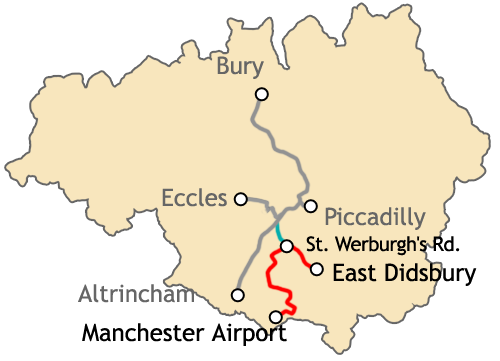
Map of the South Manchester line extensions 2006–2013

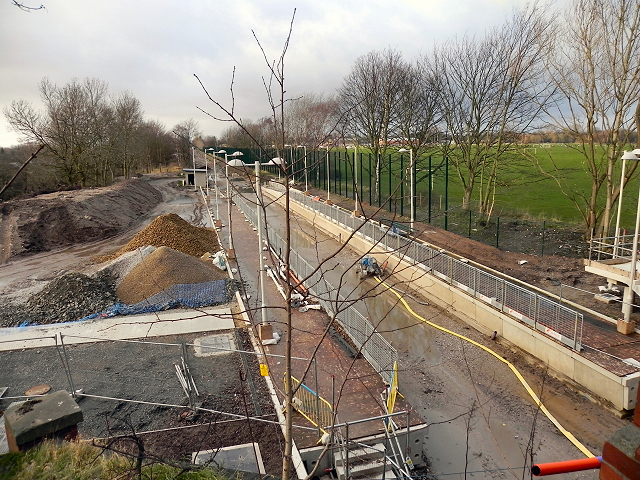
Construction of Withington tram stop (2012)

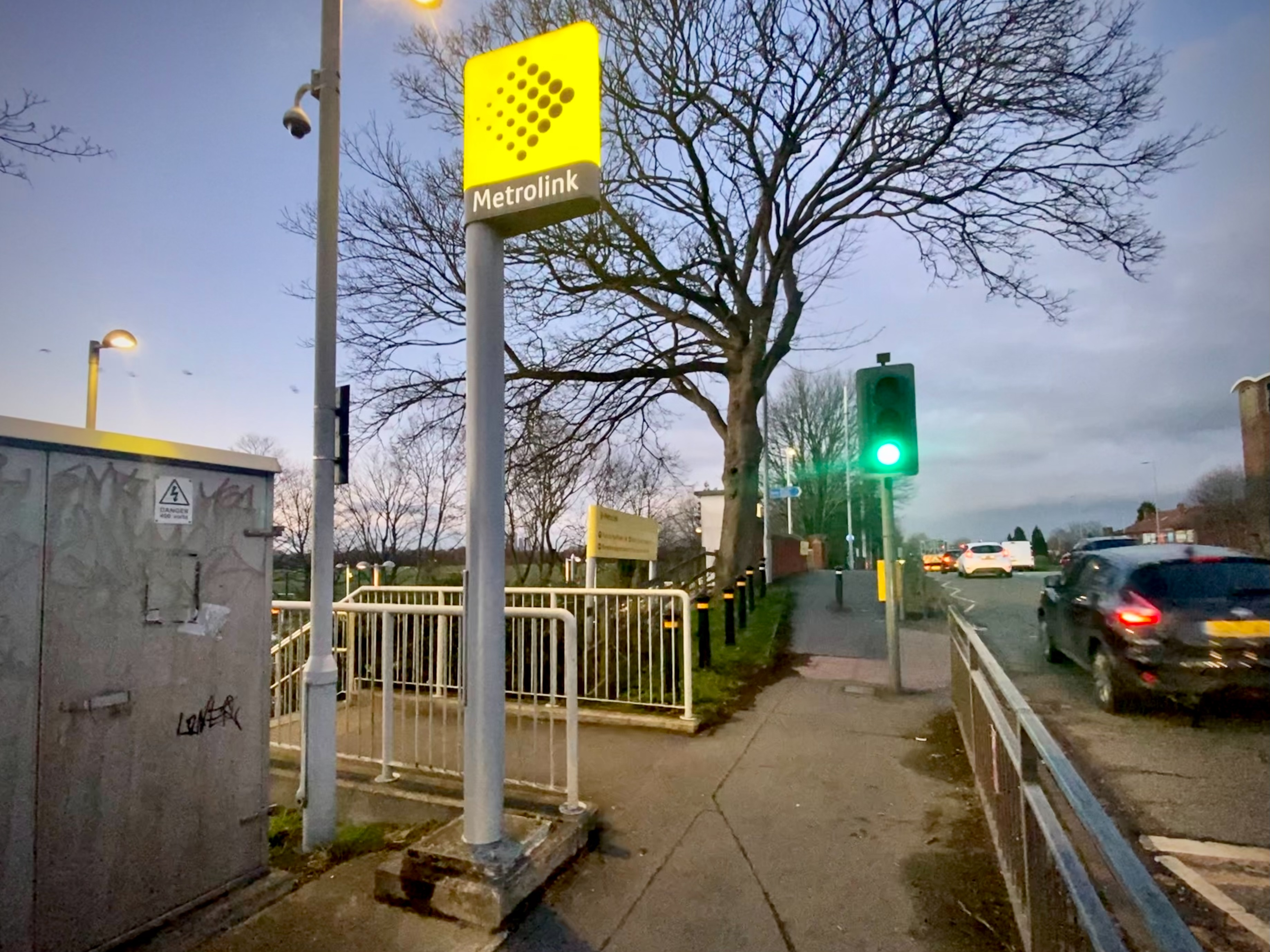
The entrance of Withington tram stop on Princess Road

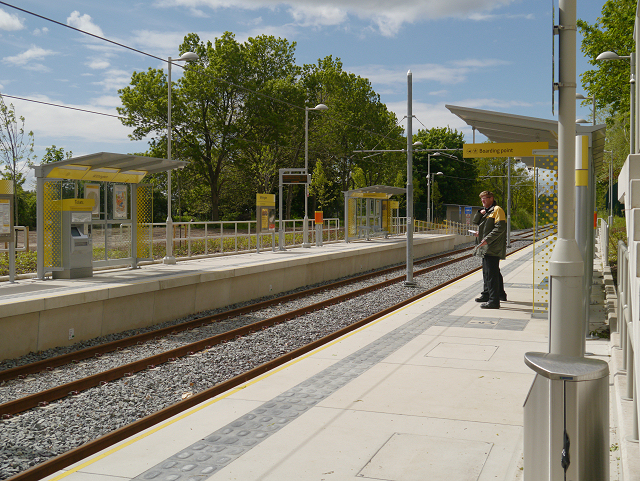
Withington tram stop platforms

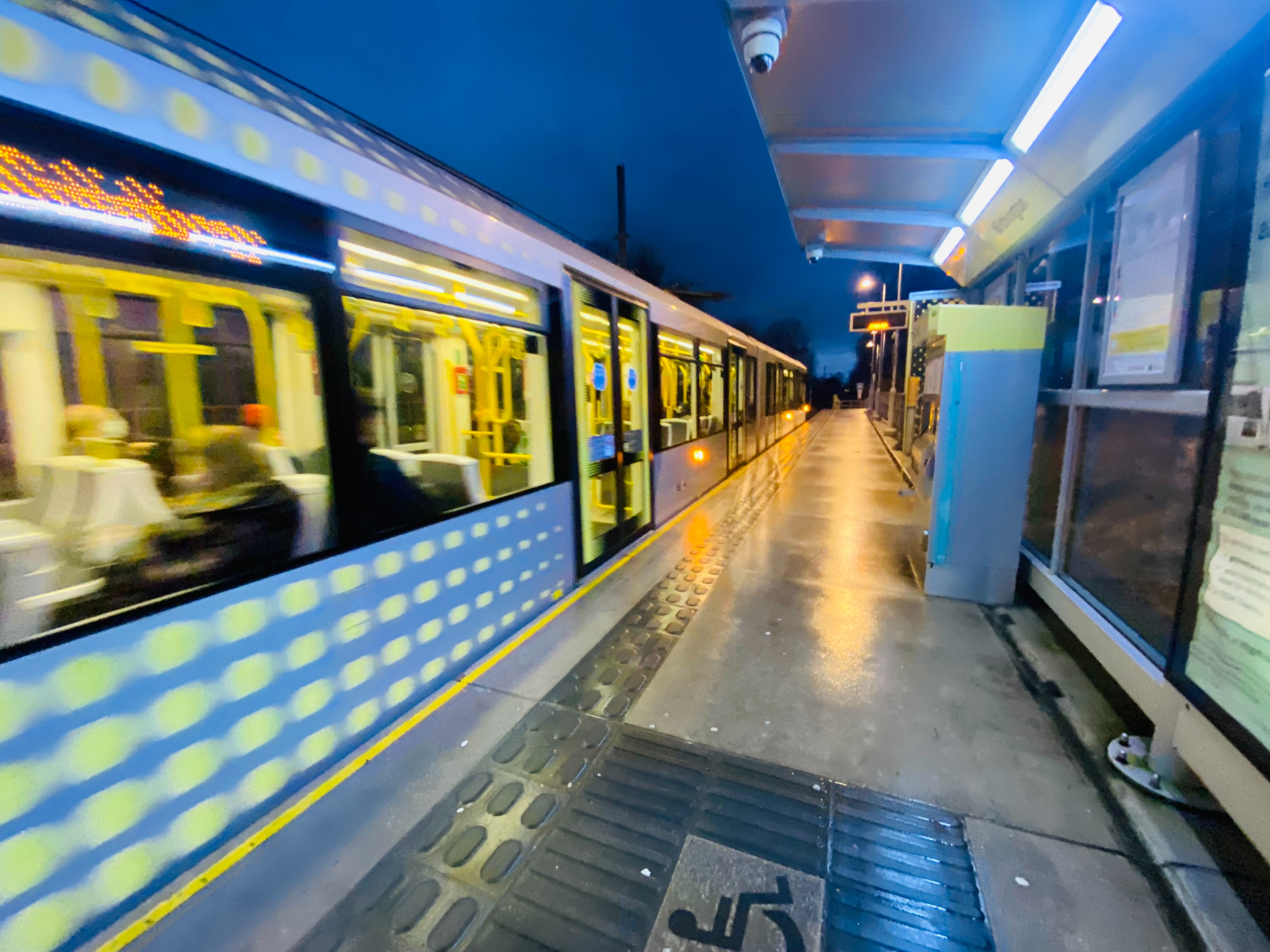
A Metrolink tram at Withington tram stop

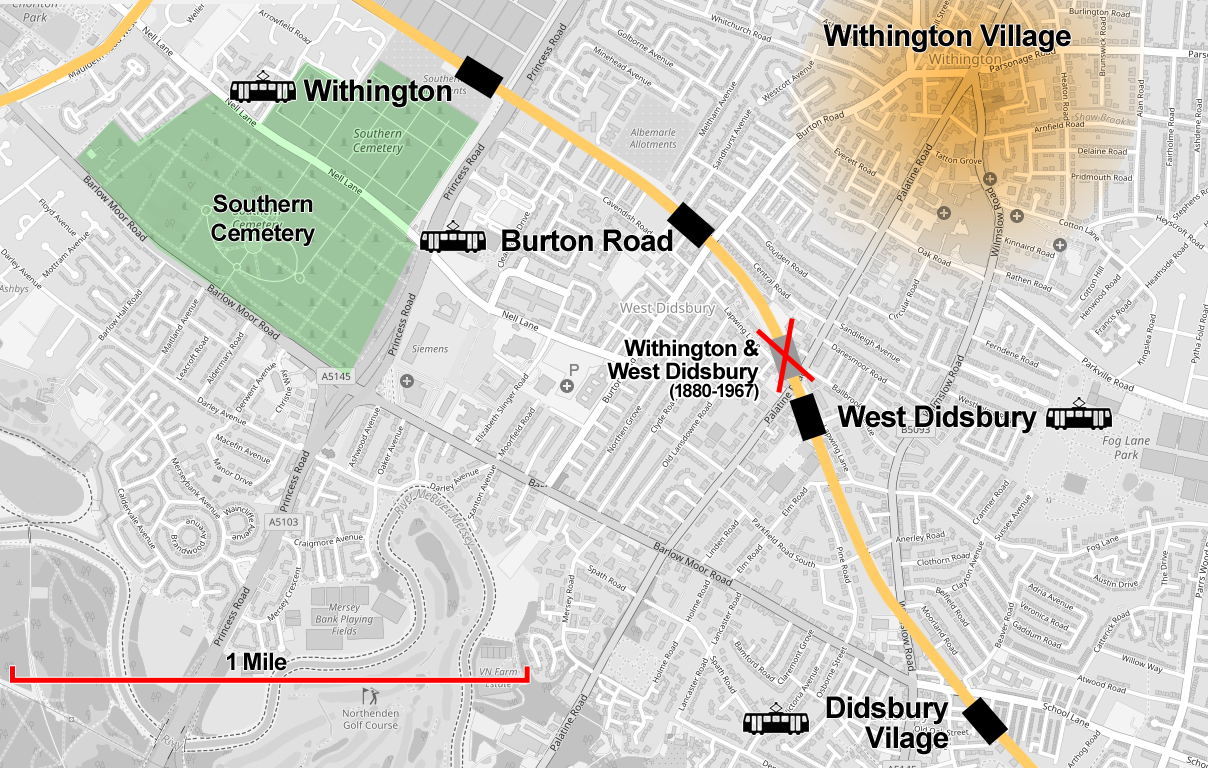
Map showing Metrolink tram stops in the vicinity of Withington
