= Burton Road tram stop =

Manchester Metrolink tram stop

Burton Road
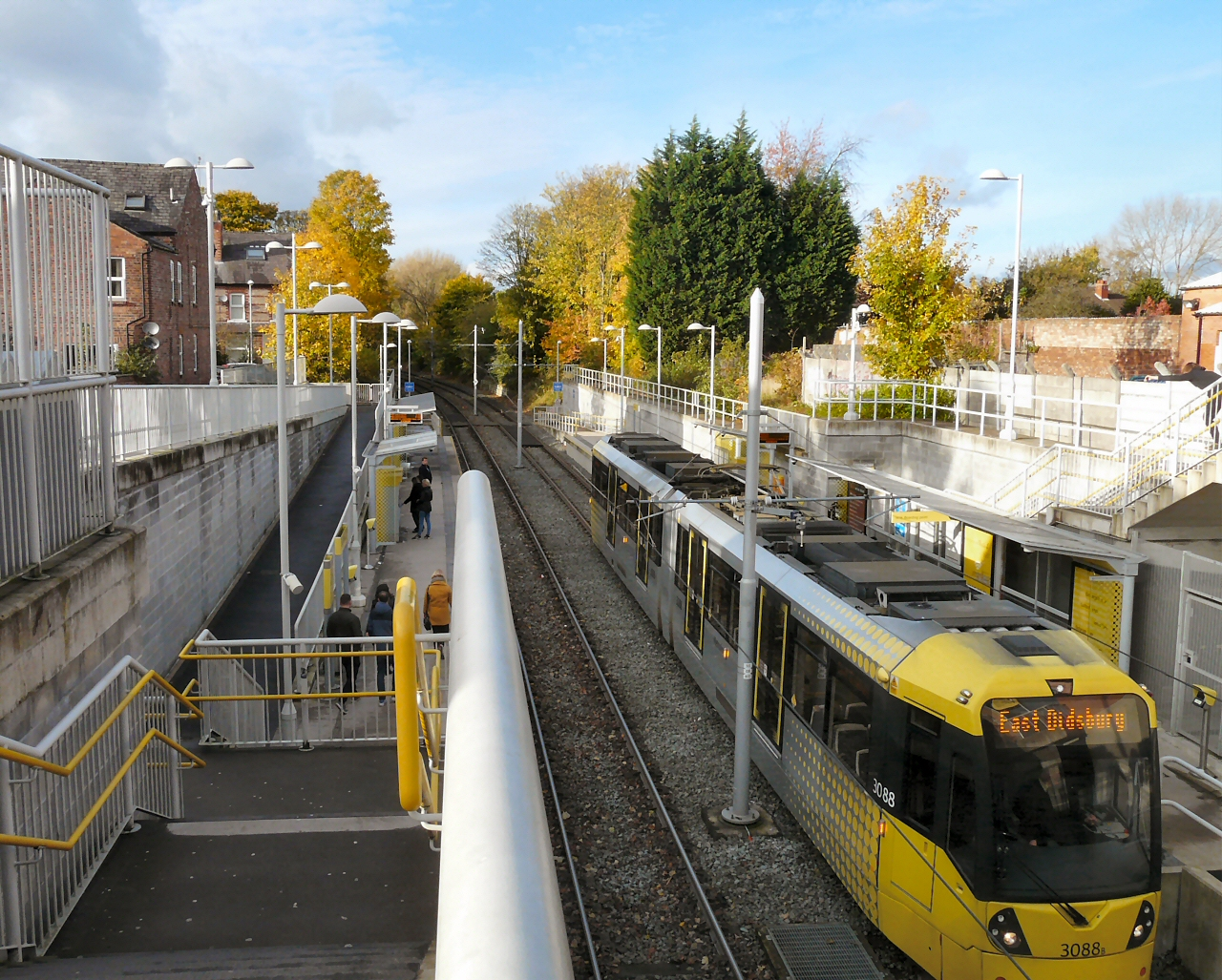

General information
- Location: Withington, Manchester, England
- Coordinates: 53.42924°N 2.24074°W
- Grid reference: SJ840924
- System: Metrolink station
- Line: South Manchester Line
- Platforms: 2

Other information
- Status: In operation
- Fare zone: 3

Key dates
- 23 May 2013: Opened

Services
Preceding station	Manchester Metrolink	Following station
West Didsbury towards East Didsbury	East Didsbury–Rochdale	Withington towards Rochdale Town Centre
West Didsbury towards East Didsbury	East Didsbury–Shaw (peak only)	Withington towards Shaw and Crompton
Route map
Location

Burton Road is a stop on the South Manchester Line of Greater Manchester's light rail Metrolink system, on Burton Road in West Didsbury, Manchester, England. The stop opened on 23 May 2013; it was built in a cutting on a section of abandoned railway, which was reopened for light rail operation. The line opened originally in 1880, as the Manchester South District Line which facilitated services from Manchester Central, and was closed in 1967.

== History ==
In 1880, the Midland Railway opened the new Manchester South District Line which ran from Throstle Nest Junction, Old Trafford to Heaton Mersey. The line north of Chorlton Junction (with the Manchester, Sheffield & Lincolnshire Railway's line to Fallowfield) was later operated by the Cheshire Lines Committee from 1891, when the Fallowfield line opened, and railway services ran out of Manchester Central to the southern suburbs.

South of Chorlton-cum-Hardy, the line ran south-east through the area with the first station at Withington, on the corner of Lapwing Lane and Palatine Road; it was renamed Withington & Albert Park in 1884 and then Withington & West Didsbury in 1915. Withington & West Didsbury station closed in July 1961, although British Rail services continued to use this route until 1969, when the whole line was closed as part of the Beeching cuts.

In 1984, Greater Manchester Council and Greater Manchester Passenger Transport Executive announced the Project Light Rail scheme to develop a new light rail/tram system by reopening use of disused railway lines in the region, including the route from Chorlton to East Didsbury. The first phase of the Manchester Metrolink system opened in 1992, but the Manchester South line was not included. Plans to reopen the line for light rail use were proposed in the early 1980s, but these proposals failed several times due to problems securing funding.

With limited funding available, reopening the former Midland line took place in segments; in 2006, it was announced that the Metrolink network would extend as far St Werburgh's Road in Chorlton. In 2008, with funding from the Greater Manchester Transport Fund, the line was extended to East Didsbury. Tram tracks were laid along the former trackbed, and a new tram stop was constructed by the Burton Road bridge in Withington. Burton Road Metrolink stop opened on 23 May 2013. Further south along the line, the original Withington railway station was not reopened, but was replaced with a new Metrolink stop, West Didsbury, in close proximity to the old station site.

== Location ==
Burton Road tram stop is located in the area between Withington and West Didsbury, off Burton Road. The preceding stop on the line is named Withington, but is located approximately 1 mile (1.6 km) from the suburb. Burton Road is the closest stop to Withington Community Hospital.

== Services ==
The general off-peak service pattern is:

- Every 12 minutes to Shaw & Crompton
- Every 12 minutes to Rochdale Town Centre
- Every 6 minutes to East Didsbury.

== Gallery ==
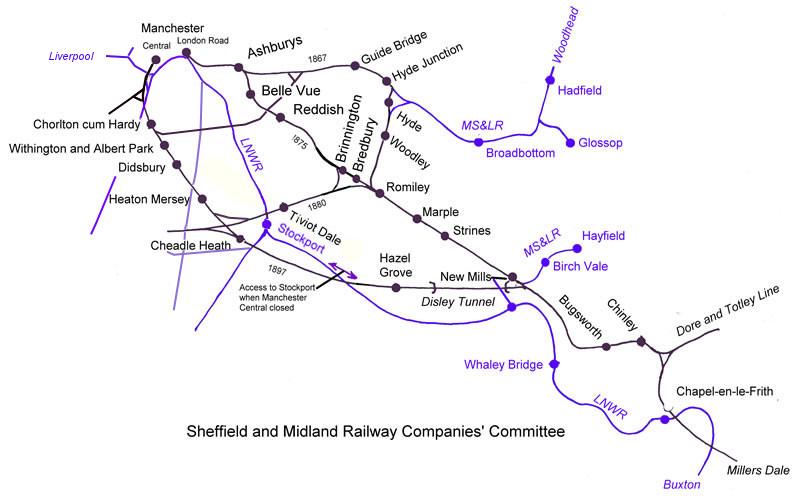
Midland Railway lines in Manchester

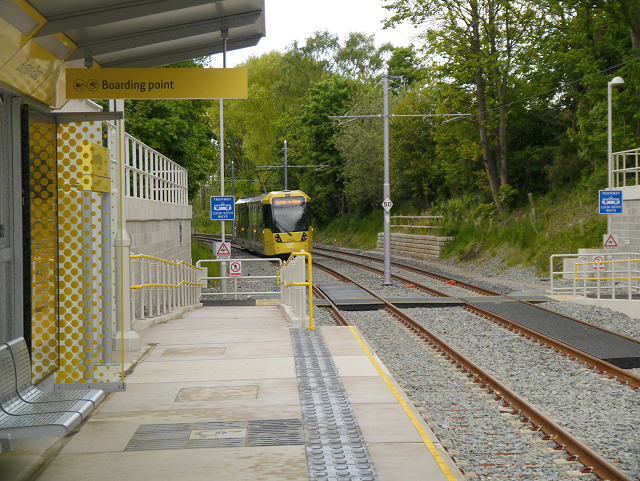
The station, on its opening day

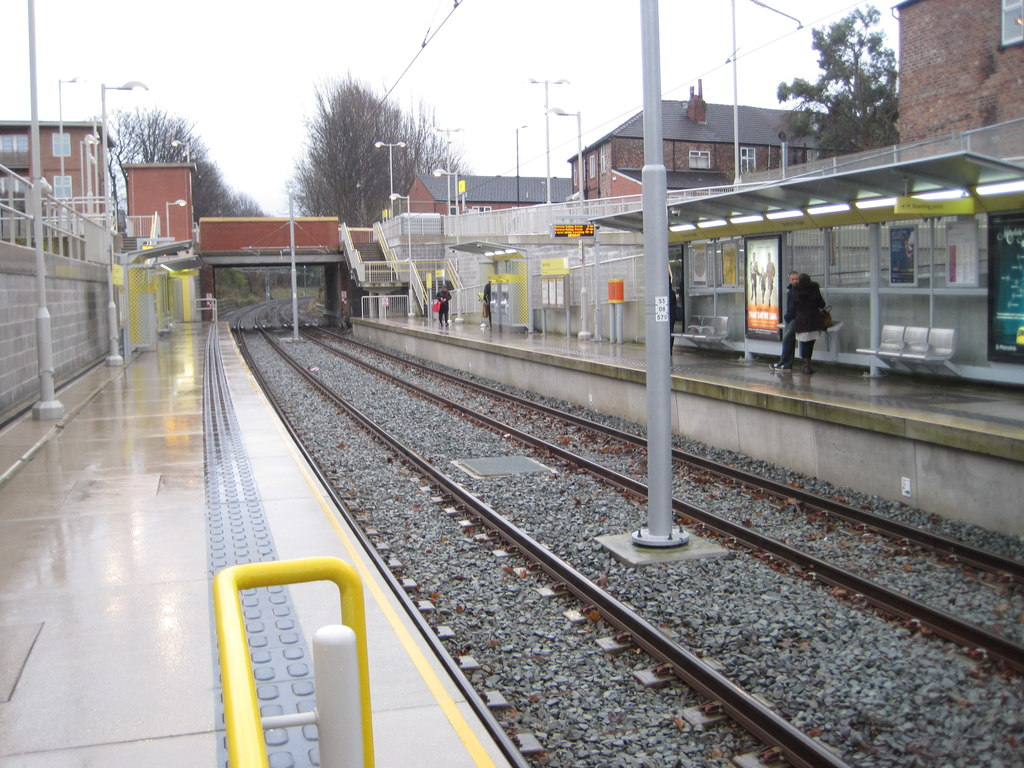
The station, looking towards West Didsbury

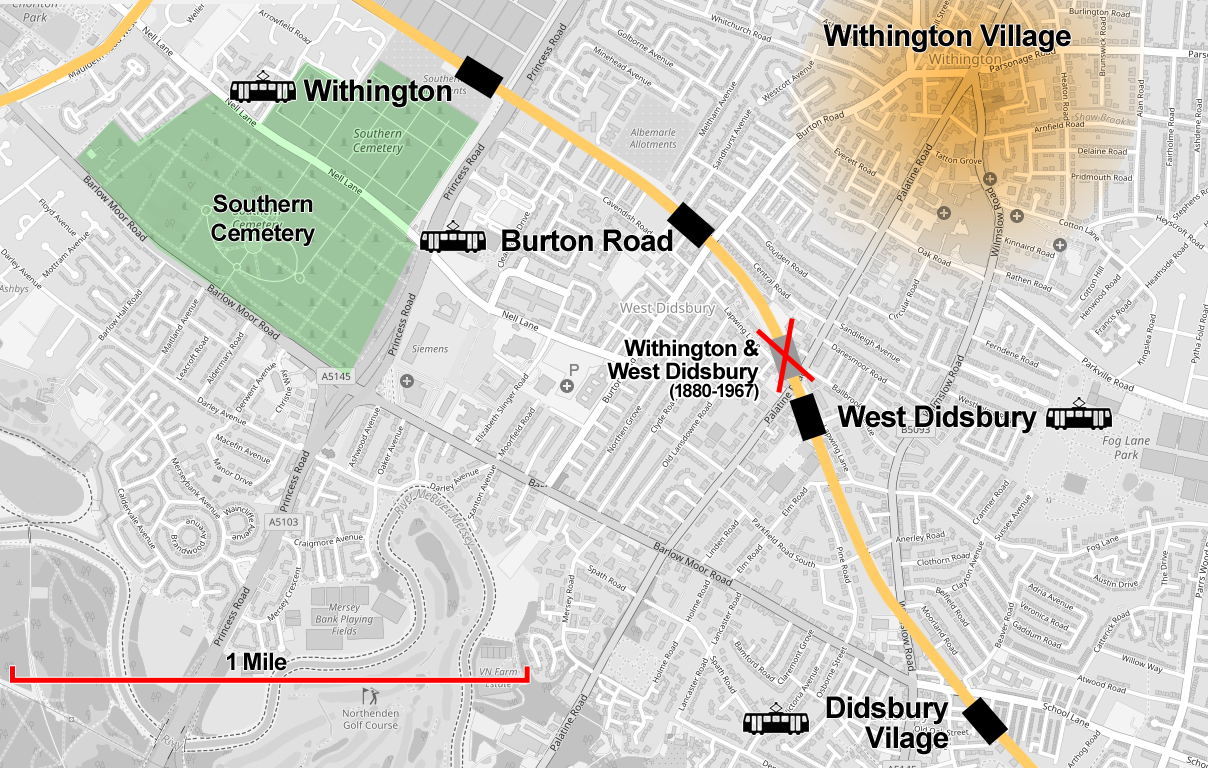
Map showing Metrolink tram stops in the vicinity of Withington
