= South Manchester Line =

Manchester Metrolink line

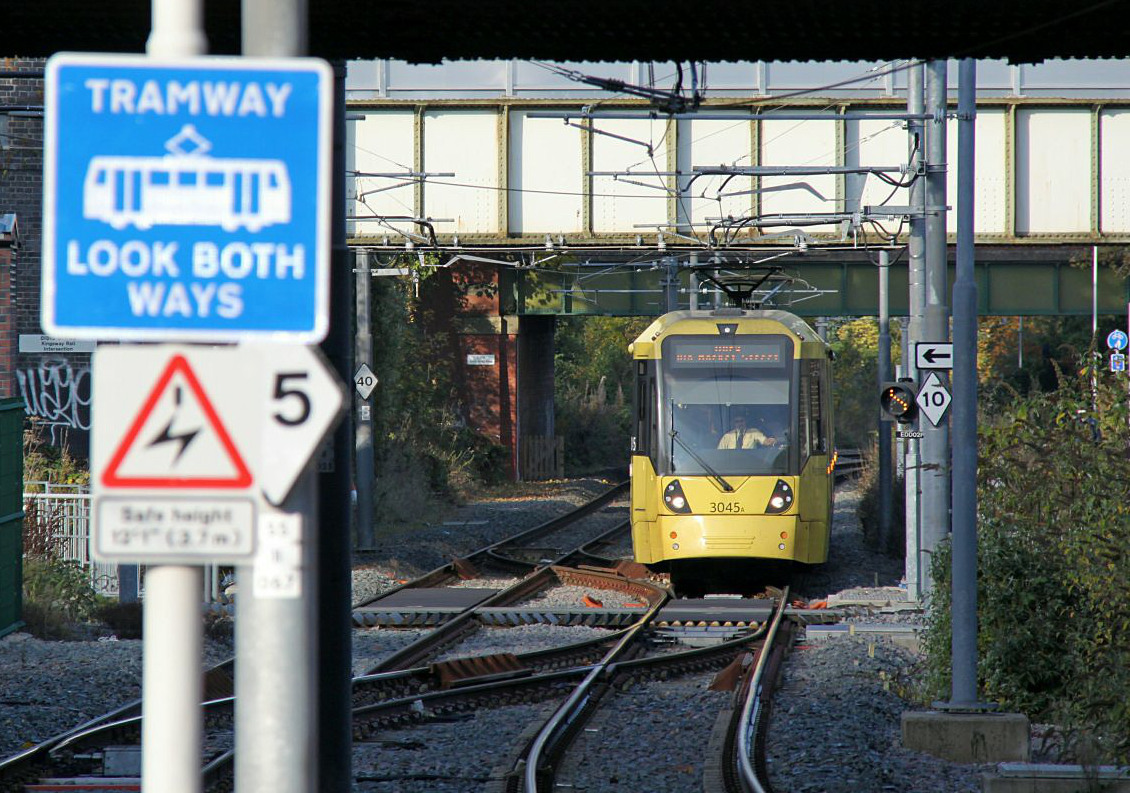
- A M5000 tram approaching East Didsbury.

Overview
- Locale: Manchester
- Termini: Trafford Bar; East Didsbury
- Stations: 8

Service
- Type: Tram/Light rail
- System: Manchester Metrolink
- Rolling stock: M5000

History
- Opened: 7 July 2011 (Trafford Bar to St. Werburgh's Road); 23 May 2013 (St. Werburgh's Road to East Didsbury)

Technical
- Line length: 7.4 km (4.6 mi)
- Character: Reopened former railway trackbed
- Track gauge: 1,435 mm (4 ft 8 1/2 in) standard gauge
- Electrification: 750 volts DC overhead
- Operating speed: 50 mph (80km/h)

The South Manchester Line (SML) is a tram line of the Manchester Metrolink in Manchester, England, running from Manchester city centre to Didsbury. The line opened as far as St. Werburgh's Road in 2011 and then to East Didsbury in 2013 as part of phase three of the system's expansion, along a former railway trackbed.

== Route ==
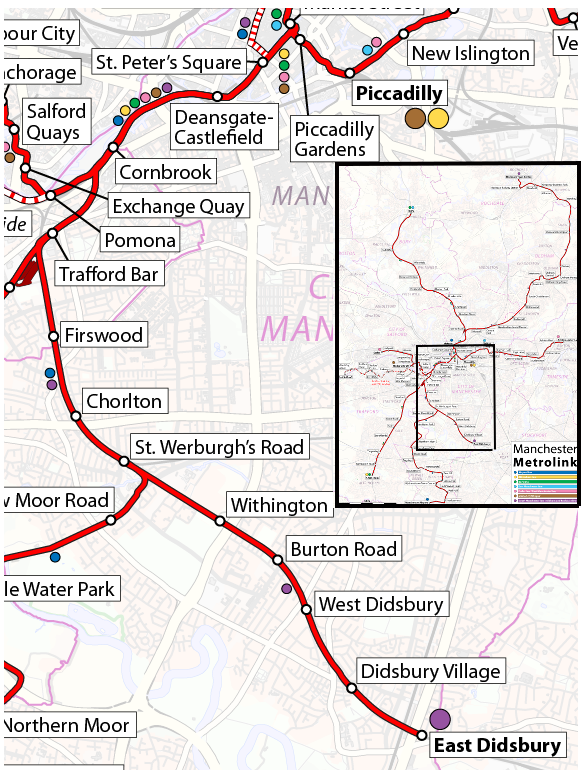
Map of the route

From Manchester city centre, the line follows the Altrincham Line as far as Trafford Bar, after which it diverges south-east on a grade separated junction, passing the Trafford Metrolink tram depot. The line then continues south-east along a former railway alignment serving stops at Firswood, Chorlton and St Werburgh's Road. This stretch is shared with trams on the Airport Line, which diverges south just after St Werburgh's Road.

The line then continues south-east serving stops at Withington, Burton Road, West Didsbury and Didsbury Village, to its terminus at East Didsbury, which is a short distance away from East Didsbury railway station.

== History ==
=== Pre-Metrolink ===
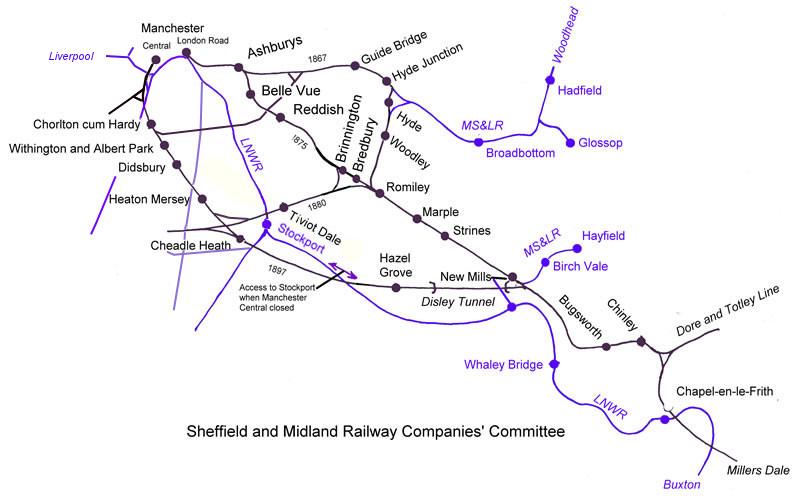
Map of CLC lines running into Manchester, The MSDR is to the left of the map.

The line was originally a suburban railway, the Manchester South District Railway (MSDR), which was opened by the Midland Railway in 1880, in order to allow Midland Railway expresses from London to reach Manchester Central station. The line ran south from Manchester Central to Stockport Tiviot Dale. The line was partially transferred to the ownership of the Cheshire Lines Committee in 1891, and remained in their ownership until nationalisation in 1948.

From the beginning, the line carried both a regular local service between Manchester Central and Stockport Tiviot Dale (these were known as the South District trains), trains to Buxton, and long distance Midland Railway expresses to London, running via Matlock and Derby.

In 1892 the Fallowfield Loop Line was opened, from Chorlton to Guide Bridge; this had been built by the Manchester, Sheffield and Lincolnshire Railway (MSLR) so that trains from their main line between Manchester and Sheffield, via Woodhead, could access Manchester Central Station.

In 1901 the Midland Railway opened a new line between Heaton Mersey and New Mills via Cheadle Heath. The new line was built to provide a faster route to the south for express services, avoiding Stockport Tiviot Dale. From this date, many South District services ran to Cheadle Heath, which was provided as an interchange station so that passengers could transfer between long distance and local trains. Express services were using the new route by July 1902.

Local passenger traffic on the line went into sharp decline in the 1950s and 60s, leading to the closure of Tiviot Dale station, and withdrawal of the local South District services in January 1967. Express trains continued to run until May 1969, when Manchester Central station was closed, after this, the line between Chorlton and Cheadle Heath was closed, and the track lifted in 1970. The route between Manchester and Chorlton which formed part of the Fallowfield Loop Line, continued in use by freight trains until 1989, when the track was lifted.

=== Partial reopening as a Metrolink line ===
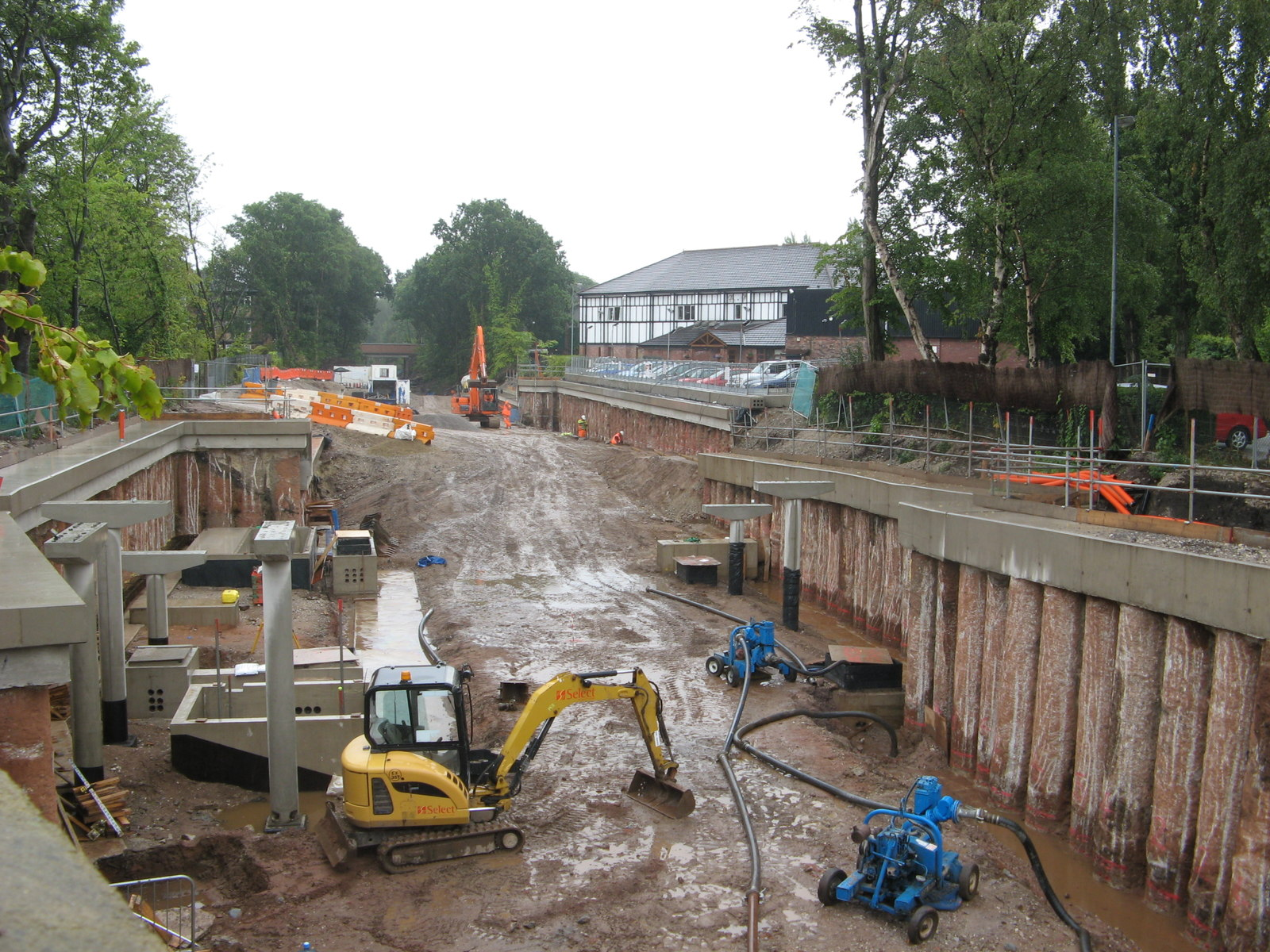
Construction work to re-open the former British Rail line in 2011

Proposals to reopen the line for light rail use had been made in the 1980s, but the necessary funding only materialised in the 2000s, to reopen the line as far as East Didsbury as part of the third phase of the system's expansion, which also included new lines to Oldham and Rochdale, Ashton-under-Lyne and Manchester Airport.

Clearance work started in October 2008, and the first stage; the 1.8 miles (3 km) from Trafford Bar to St Werburgh's Road was opened on 7 July 2011.

The second stage, the 2.8 miles (4.4 km) from St Werburgh's Road to East Didsbury was opened on 23 May 2013.

== Proposed future development ==
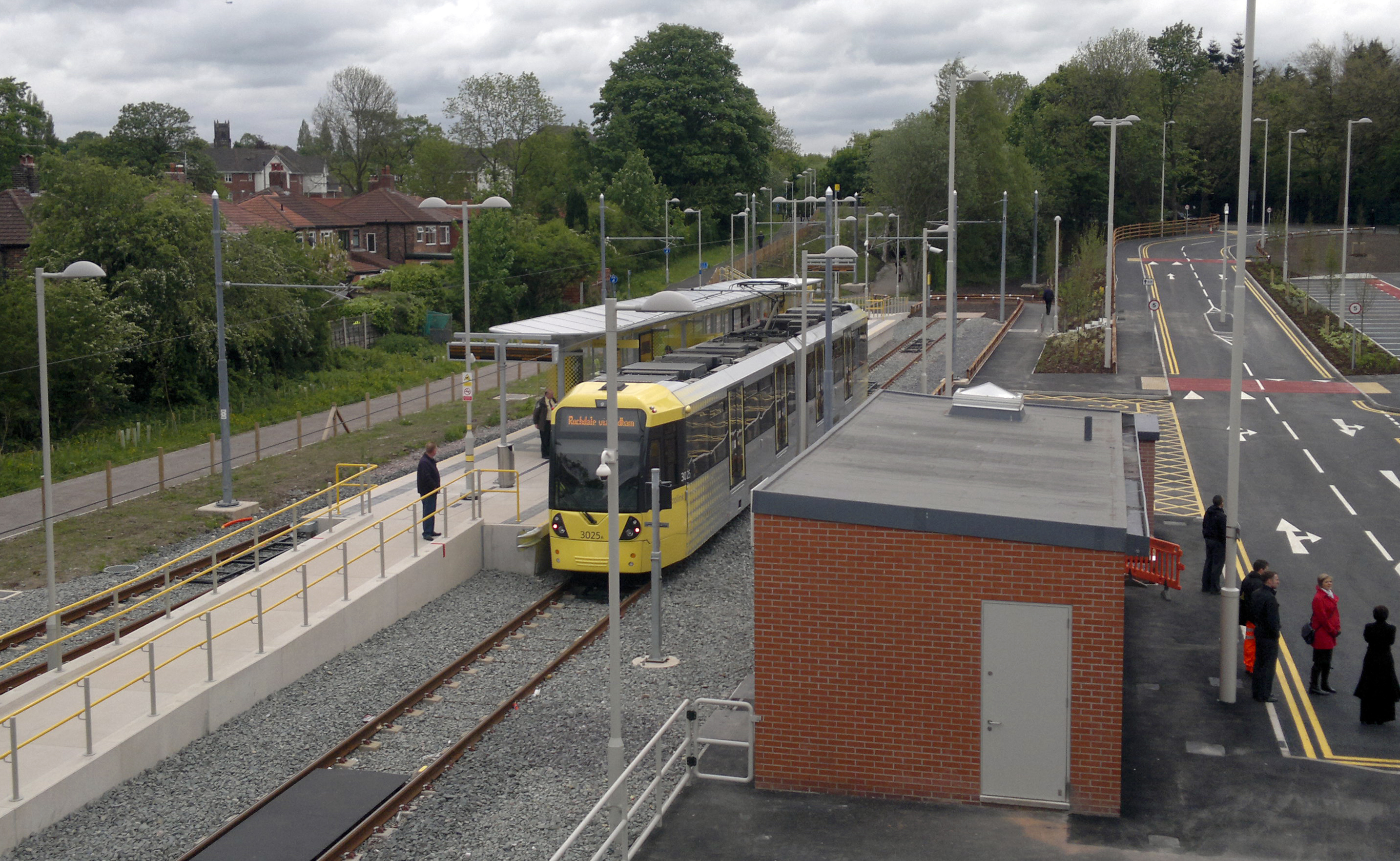
The current terminus at East Didsbury; proposals have been made to extend the line to Stockport and beyond.

The Stockport–Stalybridge line as a proposed line of Metrolink

=== Stockport extension ===
==== 2004 proposal ====
An extension to the line from East Didsbury to Stockport was planned in 2004, and GMPTE applied for powers to build it. However, the process came to a halt when the big bang extension was stopped.

The proposed extension would have reused some of the former railway alignment. However some of it was built on or filled in after closure, making re-opening more difficult, so the proposed line would have included some new infrastructure and street running sections to take it into Stockport. In these plans, the line would have terminated at Stockport bus station.

==== Tram-train proposal ====
Stockport MBC commissioned a study from the firm Atkins into the potential for the use of tram-trains on local railway lines in the area, which would be able to use both existing Metrolink lines, and existing heavy rail lines. The report, published in January 2015, proposed that the line from East Didsbury could be extended via a link to existing railway lines into both Stockport railway station, and to Hazel Grove railway station.

== Services ==
As of February 2017, the following services operate on the East Didsbury Line:

- A 12-minute interval service from East Didsbury to Rochdale Town Centre.
- A second service operates every 12 minutes from East Didsbury, terminating at Shaw and Crompton. This service operates during Monday to Saturday daytimes and early evenings.

These two services combined mean that trams operate every six minutes between central Manchester and East Didsbury during Monday to Saturday daytimes.
