= West Didsbury tram stop =

Manchester Metrolink tram stop

West Didsbury
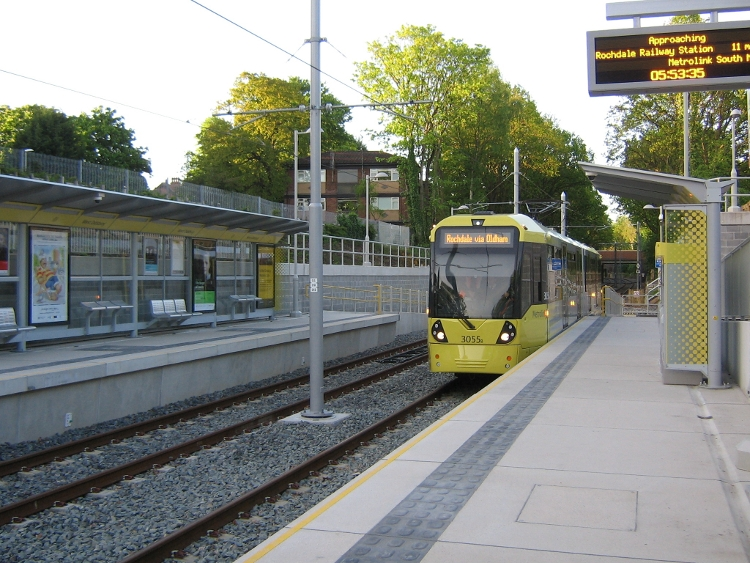

General information
- Location: Didsbury, Manchester; England
- Coordinates: 53.42441°N 2.23602°W
- Grid reference: SJ842921
- System: Metrolink station
- Line: South Manchester Line
- Platforms: 2

Other information
- Status: In operation
- Fare zone: 3

History
- Original company: South District Railway
- Pre-grouping: Midland Railway
- Post-grouping: London, Midland and Scottish Railway; British Rail (London Midland Region)

Key dates
- 1 January 1880: Opened as Withington
- 1 July 1884: Renamed Withington and Albert Park
- 1 April 1915: Renamed Withington and West Didsbury
- 3 July 1961: Closed
- 23 May 2013: Reopened and renamed West Didsbury

Services
| Preceding station | Manchester Metrolink | Following station |
|---|---|---|
| Didsbury Village towards East Didsbury | East Didsbury–Rochdale | Burton Road towards Rochdale Town Centre |
| Didsbury Village towards East Didsbury | East Didsbury–Shaw (peak only) | Burton Road towards Shaw and Crompton |
Disused railways
| Chorlton-cum-Hardy; Line closed, station open | Midland Railway; South District Railway | Didsbury; Line and station closed |
Route map
Location

West Didsbury is a tram stop on the South Manchester Line (SML) of Greater Manchester's light-rail Metrolink system. It opened to passengers on 23 May 2013, in West Didsbury, south Manchester, England.

The Metrolink stop is 300m south-east of the former heavy rail station of the Midland Railway, which opened 1 January 1880 as Withington; was renamed on 1 July 1884 to Withington and Albert Park; renamed again on 1 April 1915 to Withington and West Didsbury; and closed on 3 July 1961. The route was earmarked for redevelopment with a light rail system during the 1980s, and was confirmed and funded as part of Metrolink's Phase 3b of expansion in 2006.

== Service pattern ==
- 12 minute service to Shaw and Crompton, with double trams at peak times;
- 12 minute service to Rochdale Town Centre, with double trams at peak times;
- 6 minute service to East Didsbury, with double trams at peak times.

== History ==
=== Railway station ===
Withington and West Didsbury railway station opened in 1880 as "Withington" when the Midland Railway opened its new Manchester South District Line out of Manchester Central Station. The station was renamed "Withington & Albert Park" in 1884 and then "Withington & West Didsbury" in 1915.

The station closed in July 1961, although local services to other stations on the Manchester South District line continued to pass through until January 1967, and express trains continued to use this route until 1969, when the entre line was closed as part of the Beeching cuts. By the 2000s, the original cobbled station approach road and wall were still visible off Lapwing Lane, and the remains of the station platforms could still be seen at the bottom of the overgrown embankment.

=== Metrolink stop ===
In 1984, Greater Manchester Council and GMPTE announced the Project Light Rail scheme to develop a new light rail/tram system by re-opening use of disused railway lines in the region, including the route through West Didsbury. The first phase of the Manchester Metrolink system opened in 1992, but it was not until 2013 that the network was expanded to reach as far as East Didsbury, as part of Phase 3b of the Metrolink expansion project. Tram tracks were laid along the former trackbed and a new tram stop was constructed in the railway cutting on the opposite side of Palatine Road from the original railway station. The West Didsbury Metrolink stop opened on 23 May 2013.

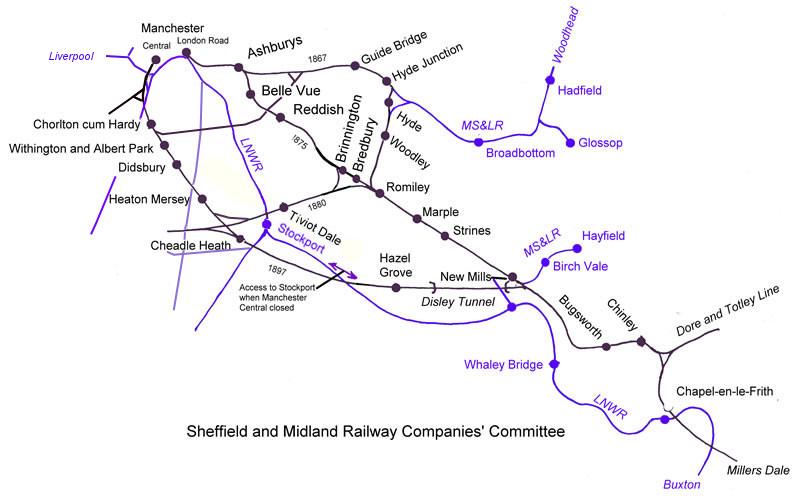
Midland Railway lines out of Manchester, showing the Manchester South District line

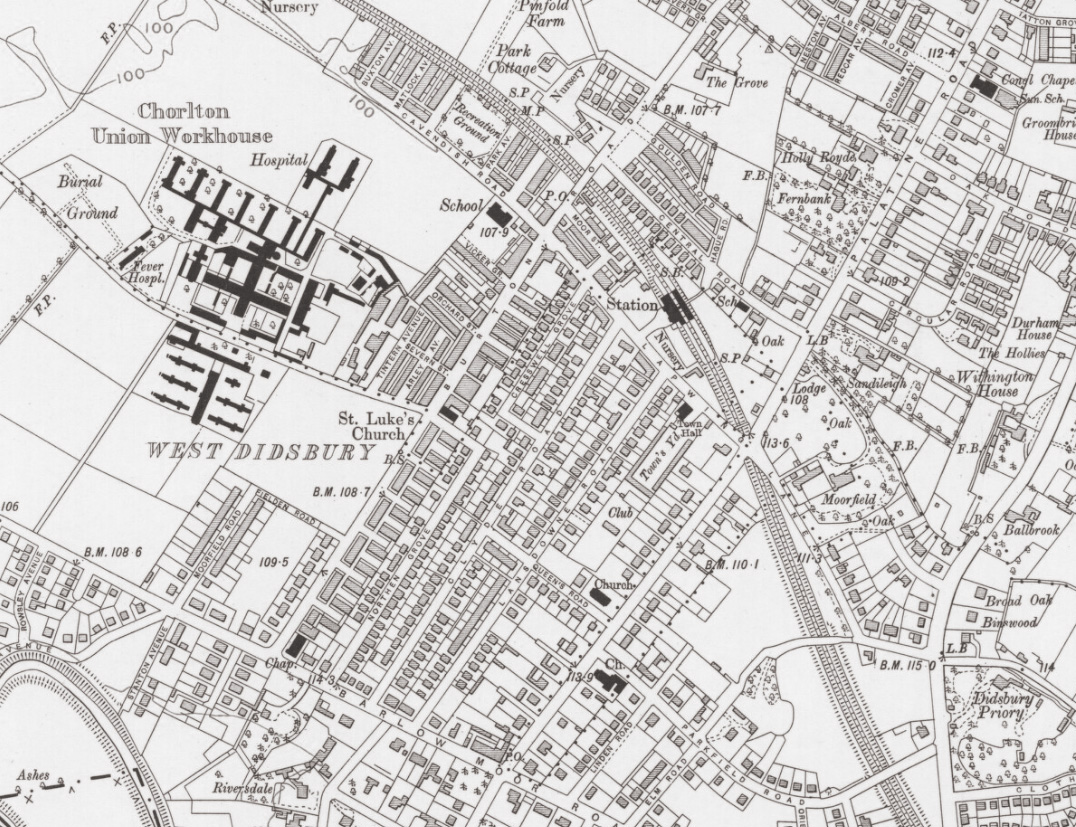
1911 OS map of West Didsbury, showing the old railway station to the north of the present tram stop

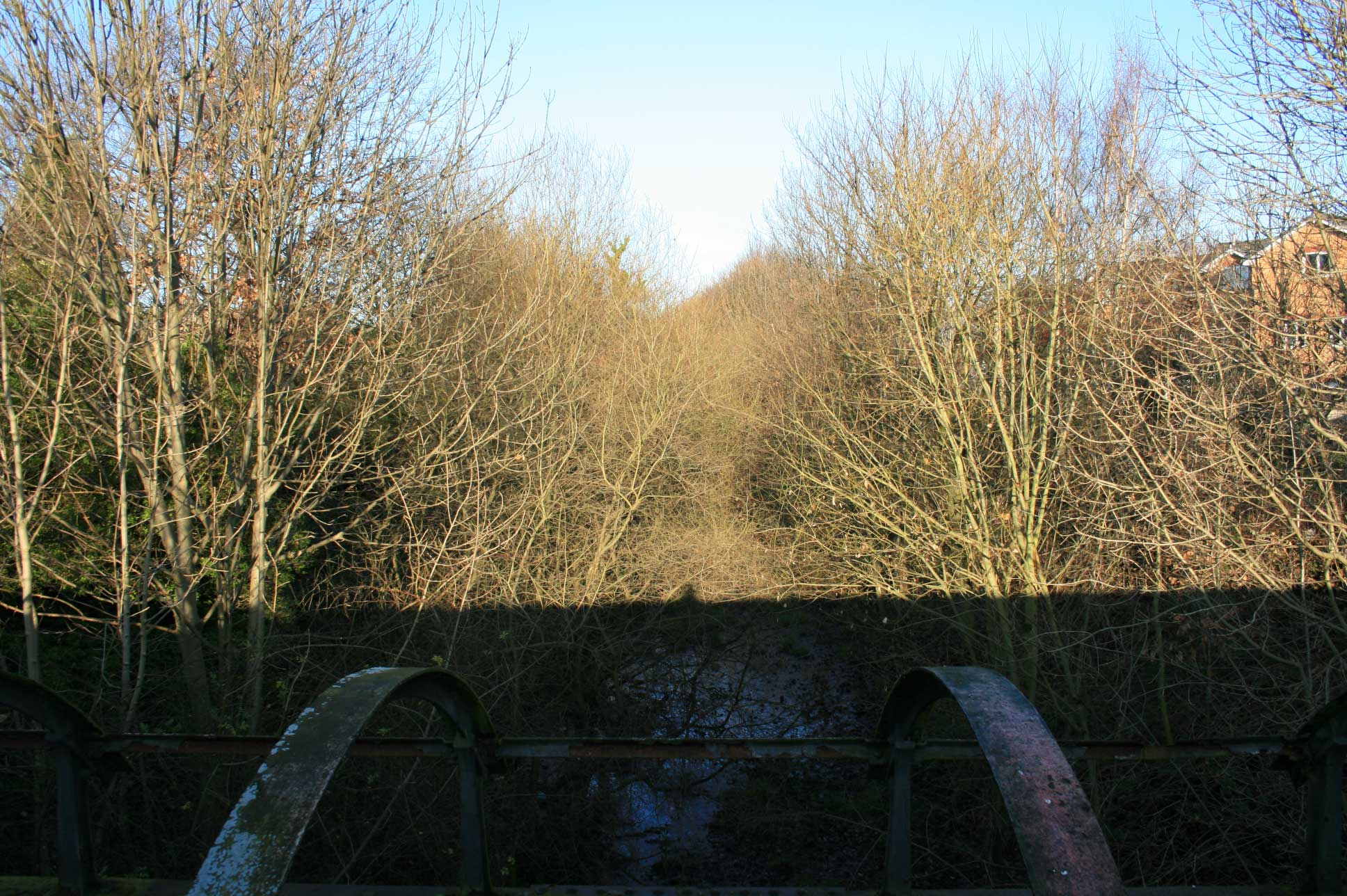
The disused railway line (pictured in 2008)

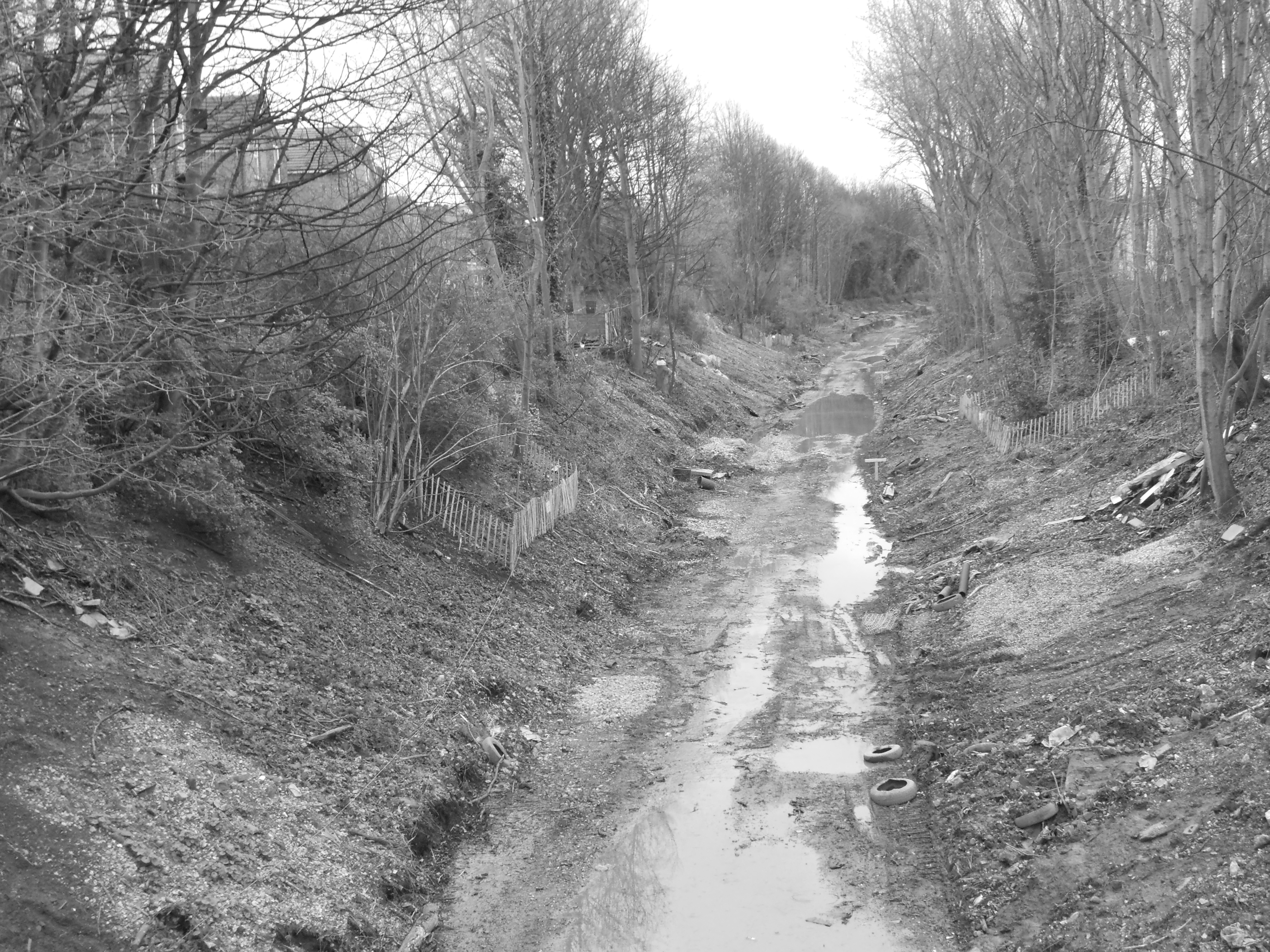
The disused railway line (pictured in 2011)

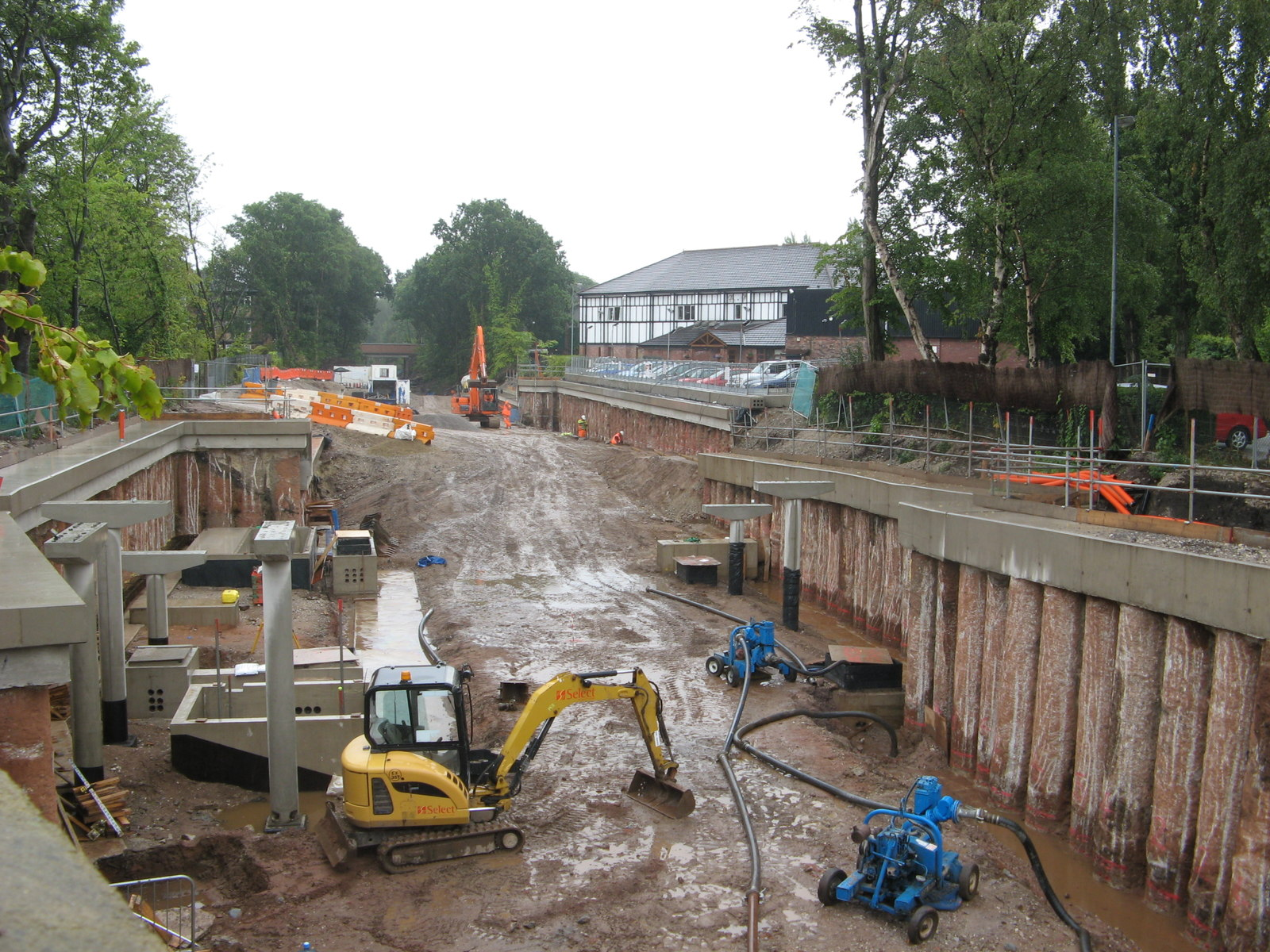
Construction of the new West Didsbury Metrolink strop in 2011

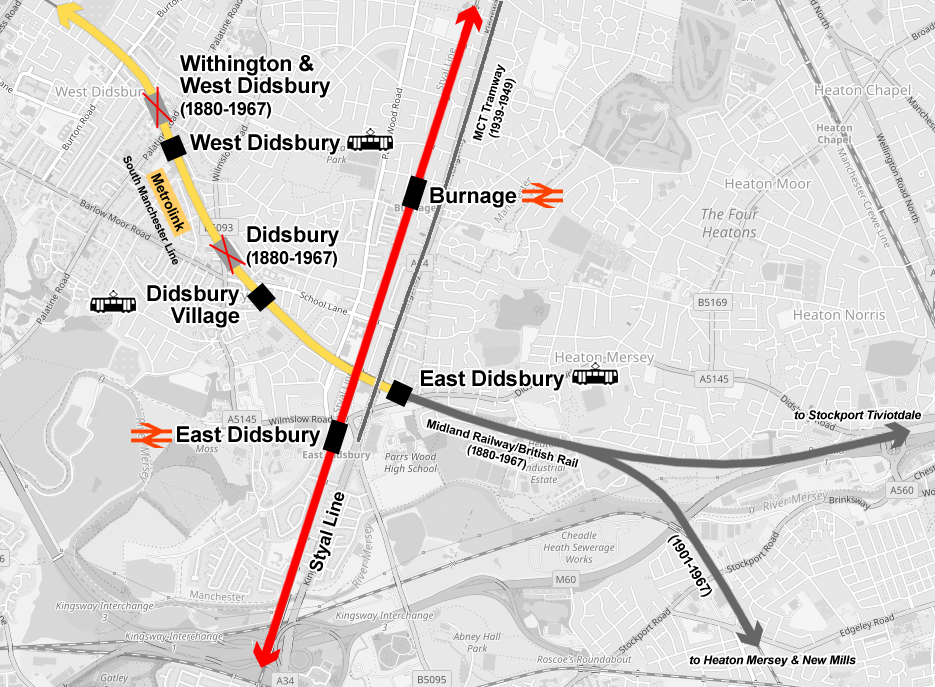
Map of Didsbury showing the locations of the old station and the tram stop

== See also ==
- Sheffield and Midland Railway Companies' Committee
- Midland Railway
- Didsbury railway station
