= Didsbury Village tram stop =

Manchester Metrolink tram stop

Didsbury Village
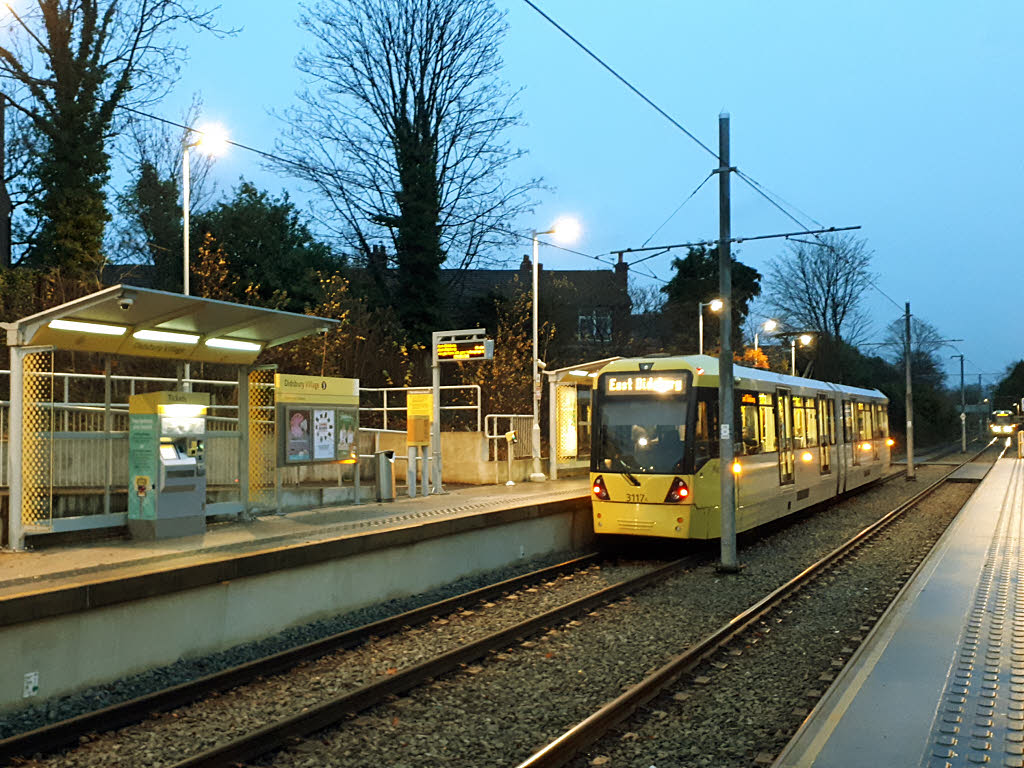

General information
- Location: Didsbury, Manchester; England
- Coordinates: 53.41672°N 2.22853°W
- Grid reference: SJ849910
- System: Metrolink station
- Line: South Manchester Line
- Platforms: 2

Other information
- Status: In operation
- Fare zone: 3

Key dates
- 23 May 2013: Opened

Services
Preceding station	Manchester Metrolink	Following station
East Didsbury Terminus	East Didsbury–Rochdale	West Didsbury towards Rochdale Town Centre
East Didsbury Terminus	East Didsbury–Shaw (peak only)	West Didsbury towards Shaw and Crompton
Route map
Location

Didsbury Village is a tram stop on the South Manchester Line on the light-rail Metrolink network in Greater Manchester, England. It serves the South Manchester suburb of Didsbury.

== History ==
The Manchester South District Line was opened by the Midland Railway in 1880. Originally, Didsbury was served by Didsbury railway station, which was located opposite Didsbury Library on Wilmslow Road, approximately 290 metres (0.18 mi) further north along the line from the present tram stop. The railway station was closed in 1967 as part of the Beeching cuts and was demolished in 1982, and the old railway line lay derelict for several decades.

In 1984, Greater Manchester Council and GMPTE announced the Project Light Rail scheme to develop a new light rail/tram system by re-opening use of disused railway lines in the region, including the route through Didsbury. The first phase of the Manchester Metrolink system opened in 1992, but it was not until 2013 that the network was expanded to reach Didsbury, as part of Phase 3b of the Metrolink expansion project. Tram tracks were laid along the former trackbed, but as Didsbury station had been demolished over 30 years earlier, a new tram stop was constructed further down the line on School Lane.

There were plans to extend the line to Stockport, which were cancelled on grounds of cost.

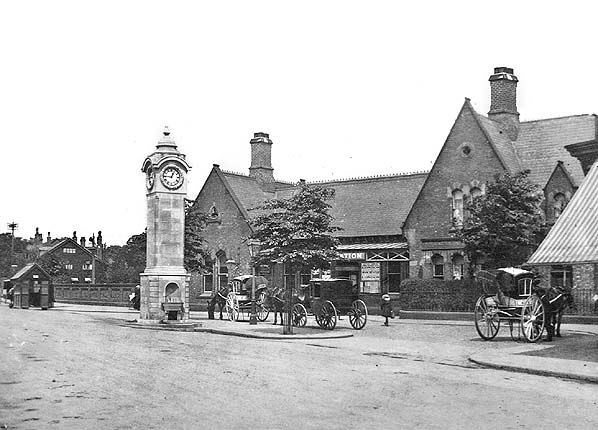
The tram stop replaced the old Didsbury Railway Station (closed 1967)

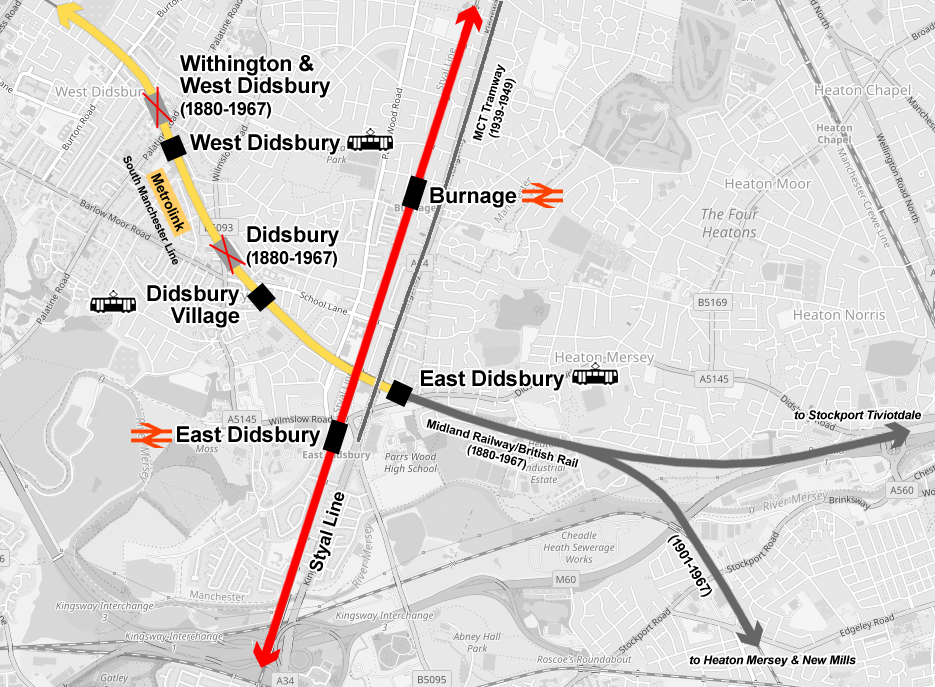
Map of Didsbury showing the locations of the old station and the tram stop

== Service pattern ==
- 12 minute service to Shaw and Crompton with double trams in the peak
- 12 minute service to Rochdale Town Centre with double trams in the peak
- 6 minute service to East Didsbury with double trams in the peak
