= Didsbury railway station =

Former railway station in Greater Manchester, England

Didsbury
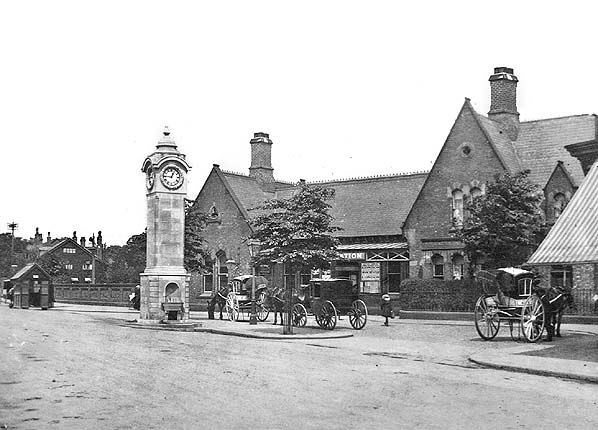
- Didsbury railway station, c.1910

General information
- Location: Didsbury, City of Manchester, England
- Coordinates: 53.4186°N 2.2313°W
- Grid reference: SJ847913
- Platforms: 2

Other information
- Status: Disused

History
- Original company: South District Railway
- Pre-grouping: Midland Railway
- Post-grouping: London, Midland and Scottish Railway, London Midland Region of British Railways

Key dates
- 1 January 1880: Station opened
- 2 January 1967: Station closed
Location

Didsbury railway station served the suburb of Didsbury, in south Manchester, England. It was located on Wilmslow Road, just north of the junction with Barlow Moor Road and opposite Didsbury Library. Nothing now remains of the old station buildings, which have been demolished, but the surviving white Portland stone clock tower is a local landmark. The suburb is now served by Didsbury Village tram stop, which is close to the site of the former station.

== History ==
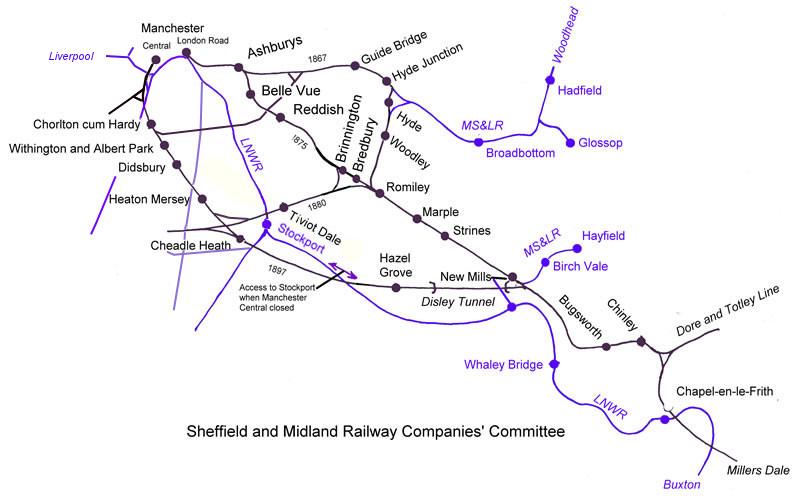
Midland Railway lines into Manchester showing the Manchester South District Line

In 1873, the Manchester South District Railway obtained permission to construct a new railway line from Manchester to Alderley. The company fell into financial difficulty and was eventually bought out by the Midland Railway in 1877, which went on to build the line. Construction began in 1878 and the line — including Didsbury station — opened to passenger service on 1 January 1880, running from the new Manchester Central station through south Manchester suburbs to Stockport Tiviot Dale.

The line ran south through Didsbury, via a cutting, passing underneath Wilmslow Road. Didsbury station was situated on the east side of Wilmslow Road, set back from the road with a small forecourt area. The station building was a red brick Gothic Revival house with a booking office, ladies' and gentlemen's waiting rooms and an adjacent stationmaster's house. There were two platforms in the cutting, with glass canopies and a footbridge. It was served initially by the South District Service commuter route and, from August 1880, by express trains running from Manchester Central to London St Pancras.

Didsbury's location on the network ensured frequent services. From 1901, the MR opened a new route to New Mills Central, via Heaton Mersey, and peak-time services through Didsbury reached over 38 trains per hour in each direction. Direct services operated between Didsbury and destinations such as Derby, Sheffield Midland and the Peak District.

Around 1910, a memorial clock was erected in the station forecourt dedicated to local philanthropist John Milson Rhodes (1847-1909). The 8-metre (26 ft) clock tower is built of Portland stone in an Edwardian Baroque style and incorporates a pair of drinking fountains. On one side, there is a bronze plaque which displays a relief medallion portrait of Rhodes and the inscription "In memory of Dr.J.Milson Rhodes JP.CA. 1847-1909. A Friend to Humanity".

From 1923, the MR was absorbed into the LMS and, after 1948, the line became part of British Rail. In the post-war period, while the South District Service declined in frequency, Manchester Central-London express services increased, although the new Blue Pullmans did not call at Didsbury but at Cheadle Heath instead.

=== Closure ===
When the former London & North Western Railway line from Manchester Piccadilly became the principal route for London express trains, the South District Line lost its importance; the route and its stations were listed for closure in the Beeching cuts. The last train to depart from Didsbury was the 18:45 express to London St Pancras on 2 January 1967. Passenger express and freight trains continued to run through Didsbury until the line was fully closed in 1969.

The station building remained standing for a number of years and was used as a hardware store, named Didsbury Station Hardware. After the store closed, the building fell derelict and was demolished in 1982.

Preceding station	Historical railways	Following station
Withington and West Didsbury; Station closed	Midland Railway; South District Railway	Heaton Mersey; Station closed

=== Line reopening ===
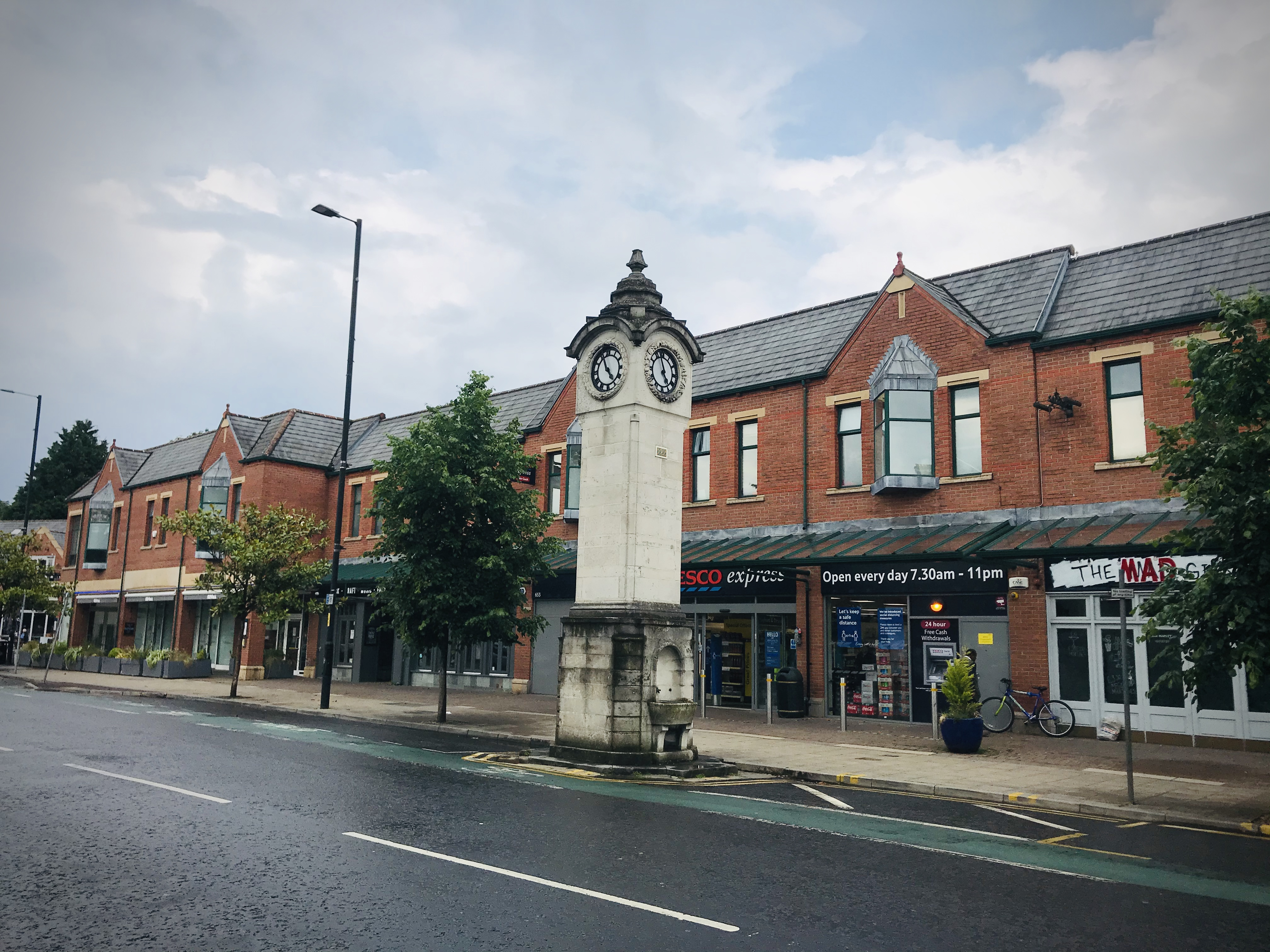
The former site of Didsbury station, with the clock on Wilmslow Road

The former South District Line lay derelict for several decades. In 1984, Greater Manchester Council and Greater Manchester Passenger Transport Executive announced the Project Light Rail scheme to develop a new light rail/tram system by reopening use of disused railway lines in the region, including the route through Didsbury.

The first phase of the Manchester Metrolink system opened in 1992, but it was not until 2013 that the network was expanded to reach Didsbury. Tram tracks were laid along the former trackbed but, as Didsbury station had been demolished over 30 years earlier, it was decided to locate the new Didsbury Village tram stop further down the line on School Lane.

== The site today ==
Nothing remains today of the old Midland Railway station building; the site today is occupied by a row of shops and pubs. The station clock is still standing and is a local landmark.

== Gallery ==
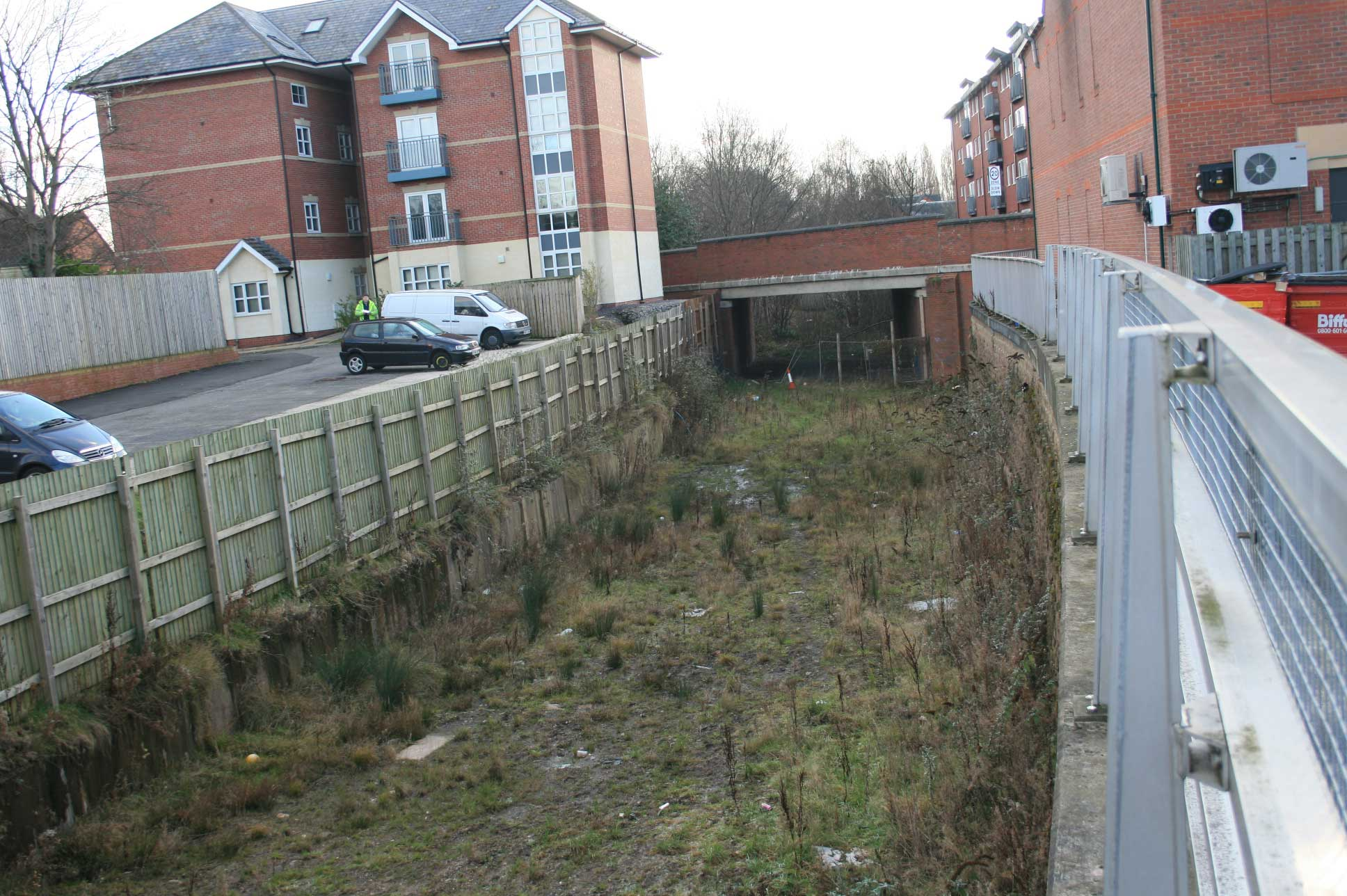
The empty trackbed at Didsbury prior to reopening

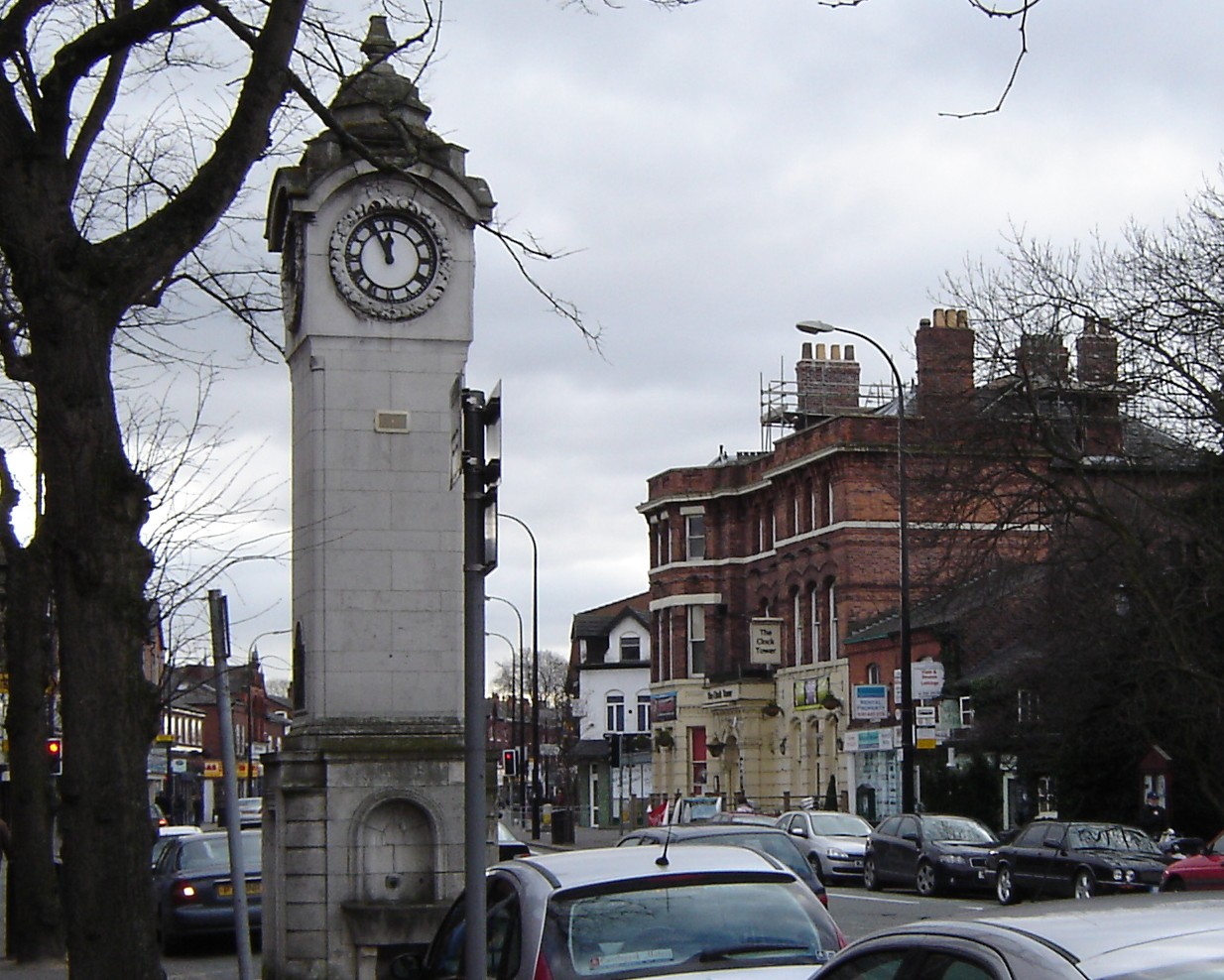
Rhodes memorial clock

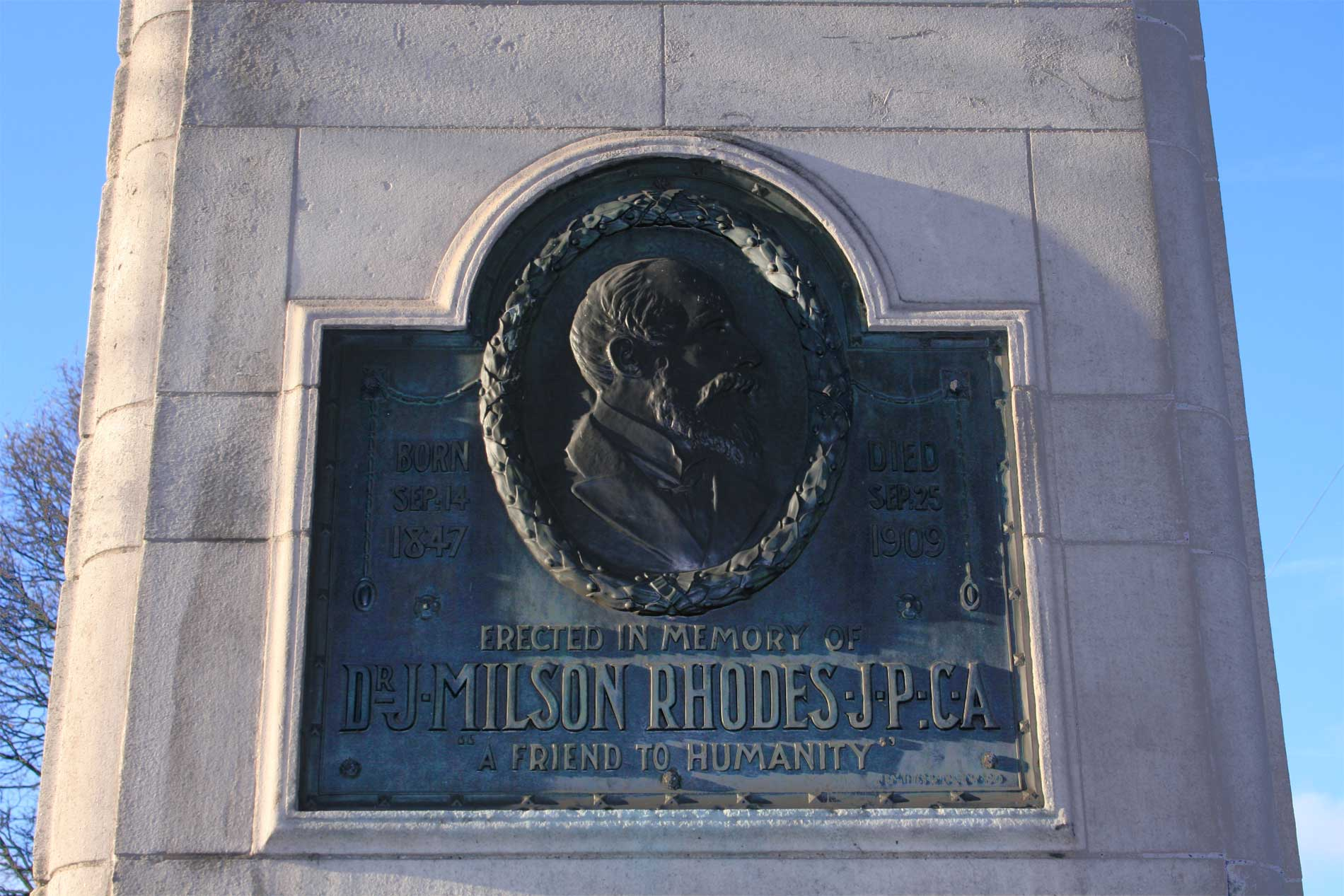
Plaque on the station clock

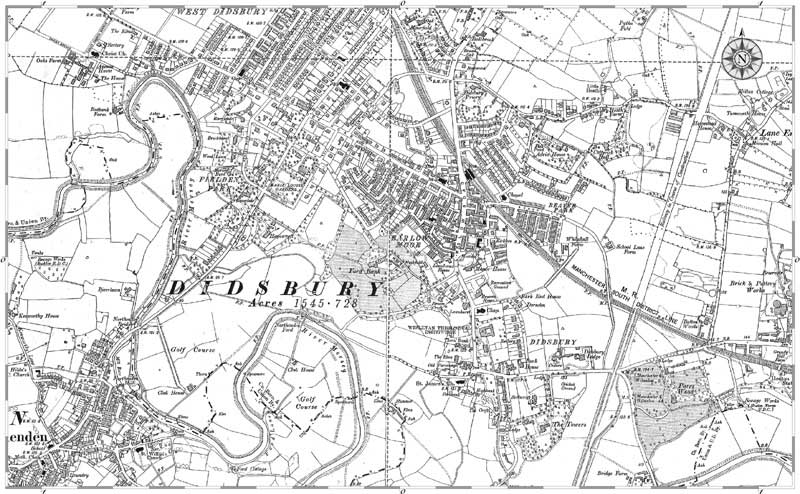
The station on a 1905 OS map

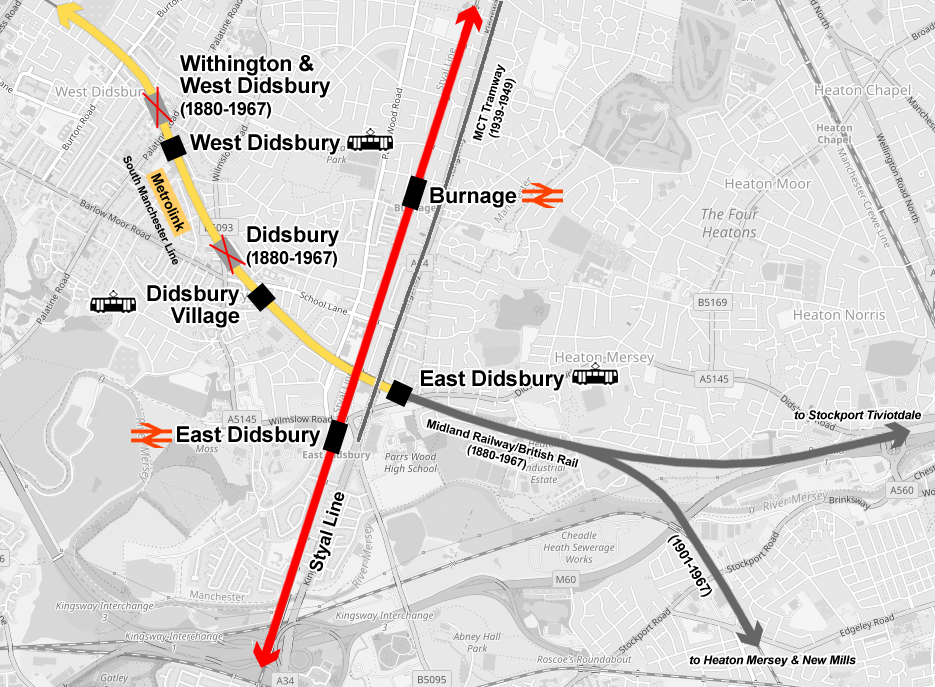
Map of railways past and present in Didsbury

== See also ==
- Sheffield and Midland Railway Companies' Committee
- Midland Railway
- Withington and West Didsbury railway station
