= East Didsbury tram stop =

Manchester Metrolink tram stop

East Didsbury
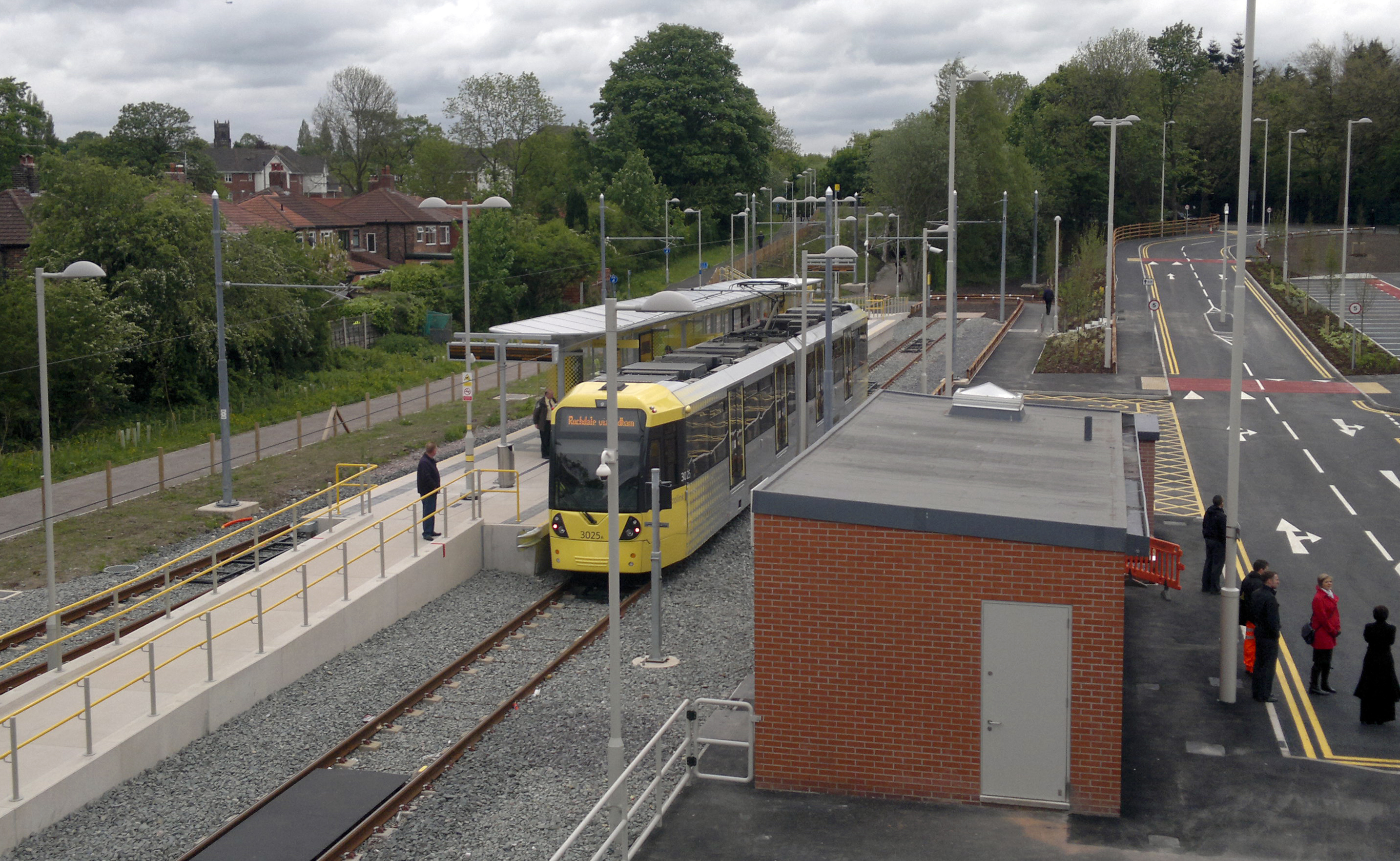

General information
- Location: Didsbury, Manchester; England
- Coordinates: 53.41209°N 2.21736°W
- Grid reference: SJ856905
- System: Metrolink station
- Line: South Manchester Line
- Platforms: 2 (island)

Other information
- Status: In operation
- Fare zone: 3

Key dates
- 23 May 2013: Opened

Services
Preceding station	Manchester Metrolink	Following station
Terminus	East Didsbury–Rochdale	Didsbury Village towards Rochdale Town Centre
Terminus	East Didsbury–Shaw (peak only)	Didsbury Village towards Shaw and Crompton
Route map
Location

East Didsbury is a tram stop on Greater Manchester's light rail Metrolink system and the terminus of the system's South Manchester Line (SML). It is on the east side of Kingsway in East Didsbury, close to Manchester's boundary with Heaton Mersey in the Metropolitan Borough of Stockport. It was built as part of Phase 3b of the network's expansion and opened on 23 May 2013.

== History ==
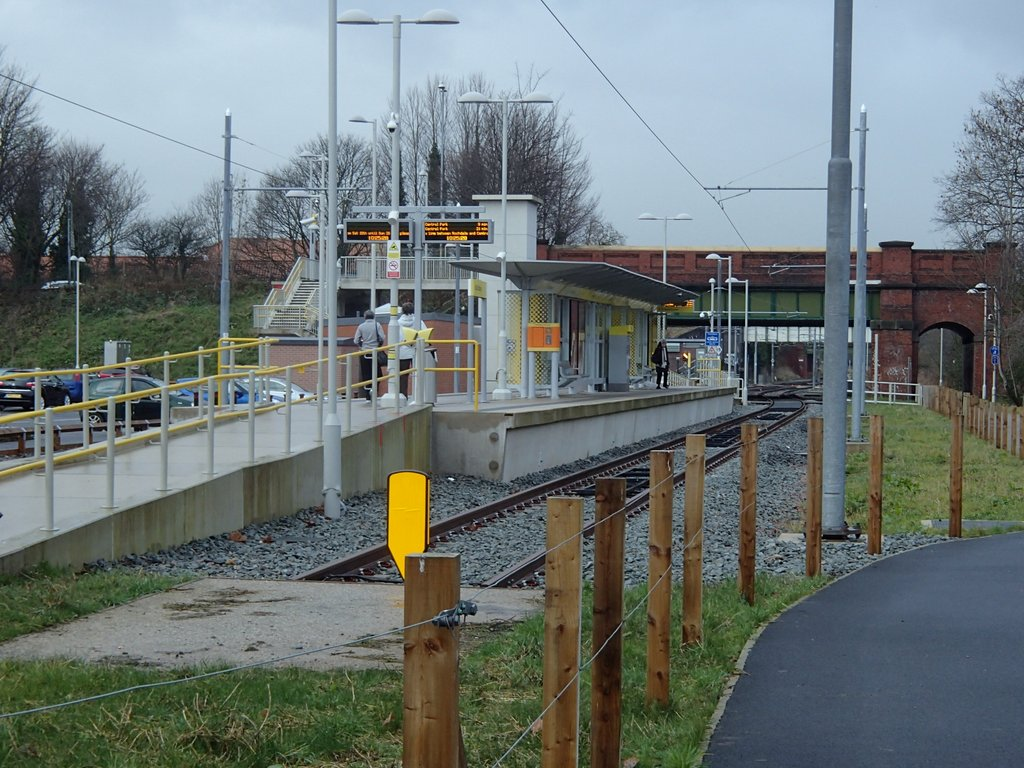
The tram stop viewed northwards

East Didsbury tram stop was built on the Midland Railway's former Manchester South District Line from Manchester Central Station. East Didsbury Metrolink station is 200 metres (660 ft) north-east of East Didsbury railway station, which is a National Rail station on the Styal Line.

Together with West Didsbury and Didsbury Village Metrolink stops, East Didsbury had been a feature of proposals to extend the Metrolink system since 1983. In 2006, it was announced that the CLC line would be re-opened as part of an expansion project, and that the extension would initially go only as far as St Werburgh's Road in a project named Phase 3a. Following the rejection of the Greater Manchester Transport Innovation Fund in a public referendum in 2008, Phase 3b of the extension of the line to East Didsbury went ahead using the Greater Manchester Transport Fund.

Construction of the line through Chorlton began in April 2009 and that part of the new line became operational in July 2011. The extension to East Didsbury opened on 23 May 2013. Passengers could now travel on the old rail alignment into Manchester for the first time since 1967.

Although the station is currently the terminus of the South Manchester Line, the line could be extended to Stockport, a proposal which was originally submitted in 2001, but was cancelled due to the lack of funding. Due to sections of the former railway alignment being built on, an extension to Stockport might involve street running into the town centre.

== Service pattern ==
- Services every 12 minutes to Shaw and Crompton, with double trams at peak times;
- Services every 12 minutes to Rochdale Town Centre, with double trams at peak times.
