= Withington and West Didsbury railway station =

Former railway station in Greater Manchester, England

Withington and West Didsbury
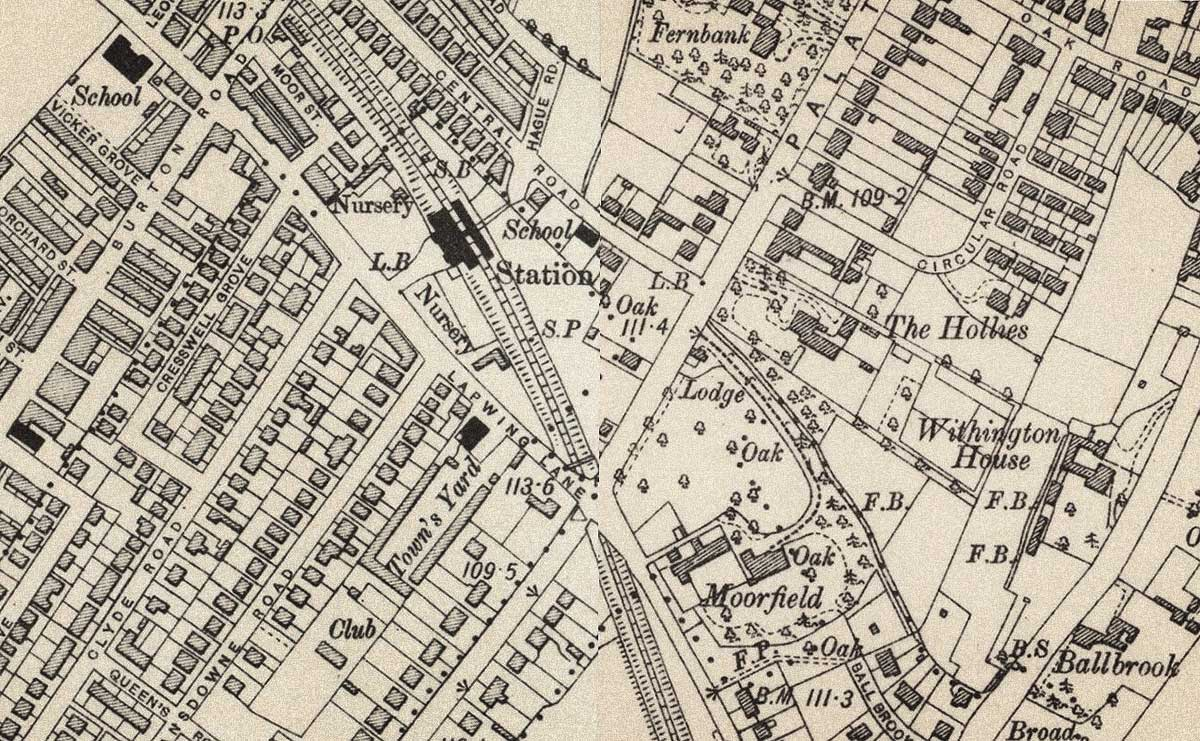
- A 1908 map of West Didsbury, showing the railway station on Lapwing Lane

General information
- Location: West Didsbury, City of Manchester, England
- Coordinates: 53.42702°N 2.23790°W
- Grid reference: SJ847913
- Platforms: 2

Other information
- Status: Disused

History
- Original company: South District Railway
- Pre-grouping: Midland Railway
- Post-grouping: London, Midland and Scottish Railway, London Midland Region of British Railways

Key dates
- 1 January 1880: Station opened as Withington
- 1884: Station renamed Withington & Albert Park
- 1 April 1915: Station renamed Withington & West Didsbury
- 2 July 1961: Station closed
- 17 August 1967: Line fully closed
Location

Withington and West Didsbury (previously named Withington and Withington & Albert Park) is a former railway station in West Didsbury, in south Manchester, England. It was located on Lapwing Lane, close to the junction with Palatine Road and opposite Withington Town Hall. Nothing now remains of the old station buildings, which have been demolished. The area is now served by West Didsbury tram stop, which is approximately 85 metres (279 ft) further down the line from the original station.

== History ==
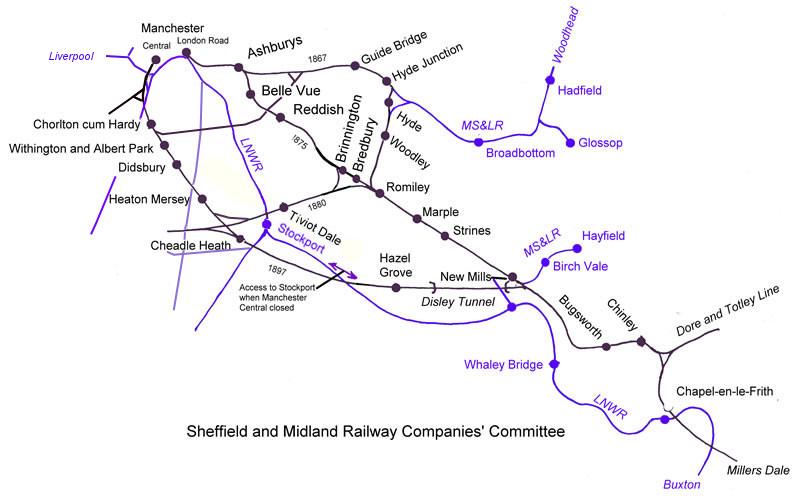
Midland Railway lines into Manchester showing the Manchester South District Line

In 1873, the Manchester South District Railway obtained permission to construct a new railway line from Manchester to Alderley. The company fell into financial difficulty and was eventually bought out by the Midland Railway in 1877, which went on to build the line. Construction began in 1878 and the line opened to passenger service on 1 January 1880, running from the new Manchester Central station through south Manchester suburbs to Stockport Tiviot Dale.

The station at West Didsbury opened on 1 January 1880 and was originally named Withington, even though it was located around 1 mile (1.6 km) south of Withington. There was uncertainty concerning the station name; four years later in 1884, the Midland Railway decided to rename the station Withington and Albert Park, possibly in an effort to associate it with the fashionable Albert Park housing development and to attract more passengers. In 1915, the station was renamed once again, to Withington & West Didsbury, reflecting its geographical location.

The line ran south through West Didsbury, via a cutting, passing underneath Palatine Road. Withington & West Didsbury station was situated on the north side of Lapwing Lane, set back from the road with a small forecourt area. The station building was a red brick Gothic Revival house, almost identical in style to other nearby stations of the period such as Didsbury. The building incorporated a booking hall, a parcels office, and ladies' and gentlemen's waiting rooms, as well as a two-storey stationmaster's house. There were two platforms in the cutting with glass canopies and a footbridge. Withington Town Hall, which stood opposite the station, was built for Withington Local Board in the early 1880s.

From 1923, the MR was absorbed into the London, Midland and Scottish Railway and, after 1948, the line became part of British Railways.

=== Closure ===
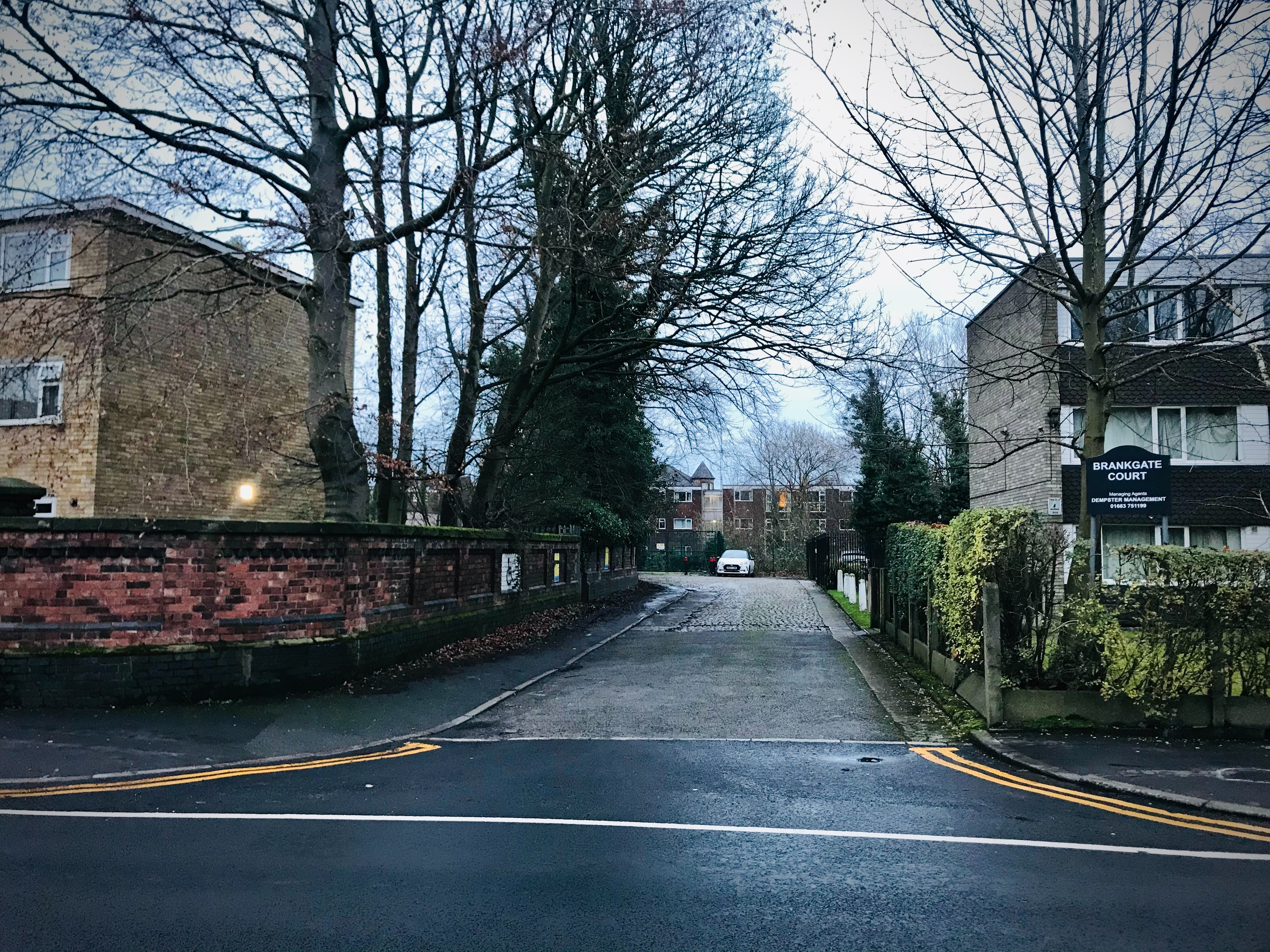
Brankgate Court flats on Lapwing Lane, built on the former station site in the early 1970s

After the station's initial popularity, passenger use from Withington & West Didsbury declined after 1900; this was possibly brought about by competition from Manchester Corporation Tramways, which opened a tram line along Palatine Road to West Didsbury in 1900. When the former London & North Western Railway line from Manchester Piccadilly became the principal route for London express trains, the South District Line lost its importance.

In the post-war period, the South District Service declined in frequency and, in 1961, British Railways decided to close the station due to low footfall. The last passenger train departed Withington & West Didsbury station on 2 July 1961. Passenger express and freight trains continued to run through the site until the line was fully closed in 1969.

The station building was demolished in around 1969. Nothing remains today of the old Midland Railway station building, although the platforms remained extant; the site today is occupied by a block of flats.

Preceding station	Historical railways	Following station
Chorlton-cum-Hardy; Station closed	Midland Railway; South District Railway	Didsbury; Station closed

== Line reopening ==
The former South District Line lay derelict for several decades. In 1984, Greater Manchester Council and the Greater Manchester Passenger Transport Executive announced the Project Light Rail scheme to develop a new light rail/tram system by reopening use of disused railway lines in the region, including the route through West Didsbury.

The first phase of the Manchester Metrolink system opened in 1992, but it was not until 2013 that the network was expanded to reach West Didsbury. Tram tracks were laid along the former trackbed but, as West Didsbury station had been demolished over 40 years earlier, it was decided to locate the new West Didsbury tram stop approximately 85 metres (279 ft) further down the line from the original railway station, on the other side of Palatine Road.

== Gallery ==
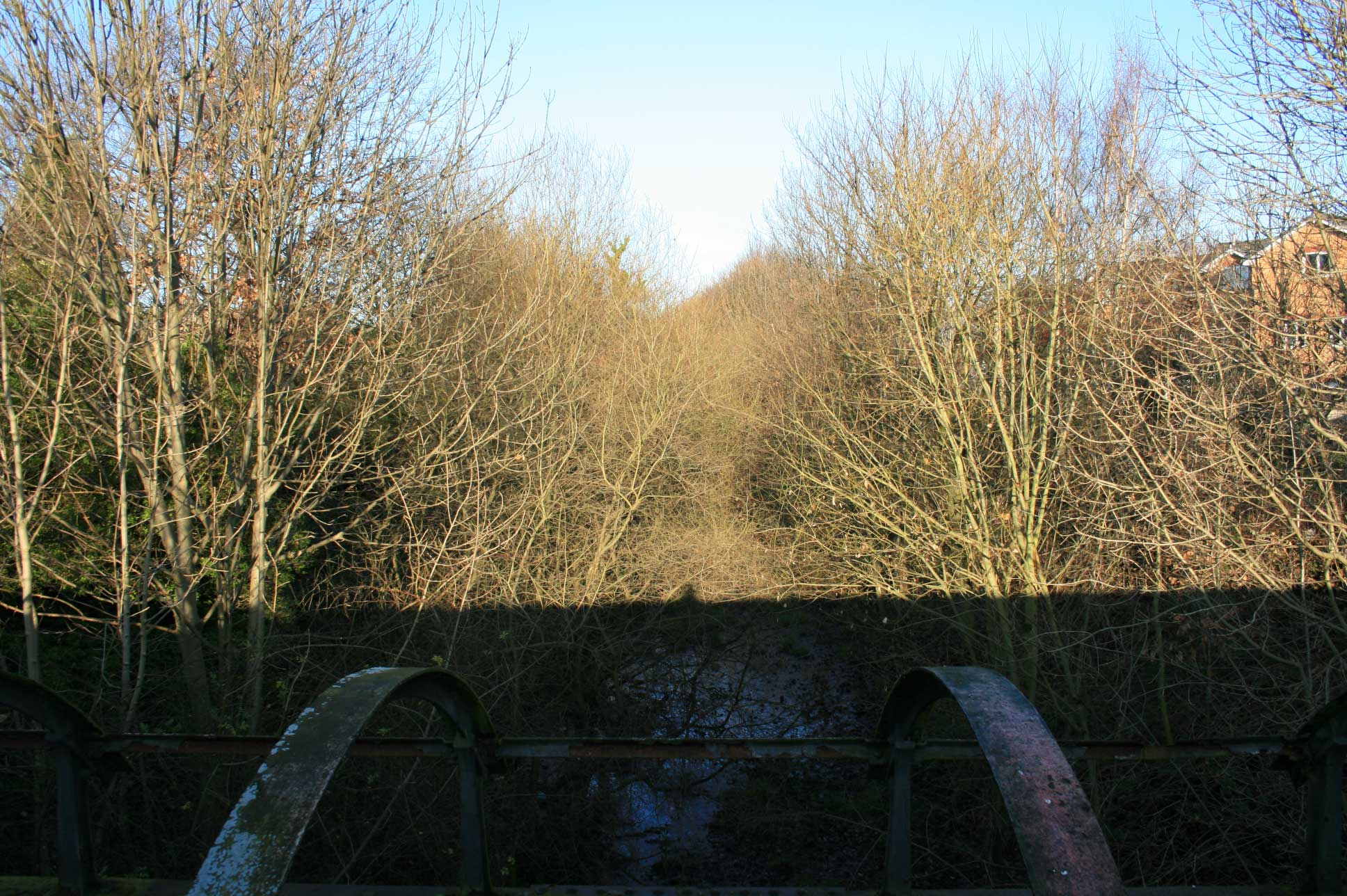
The derelict site of the station, 2008

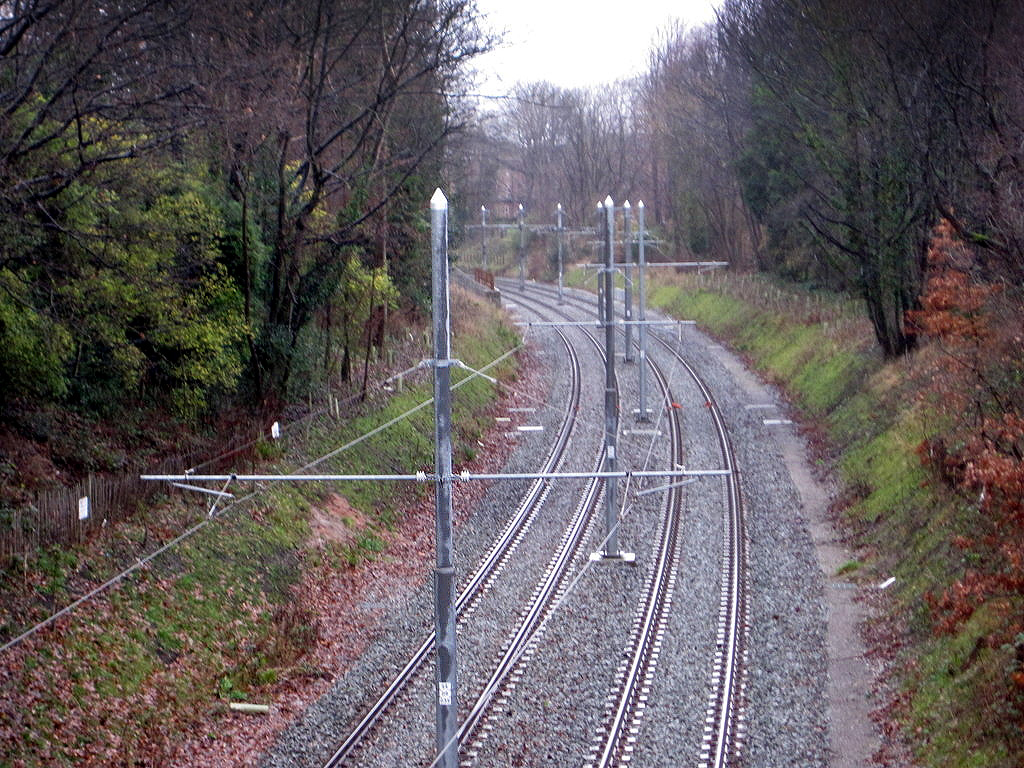
The site of the station on the new Metrolink line

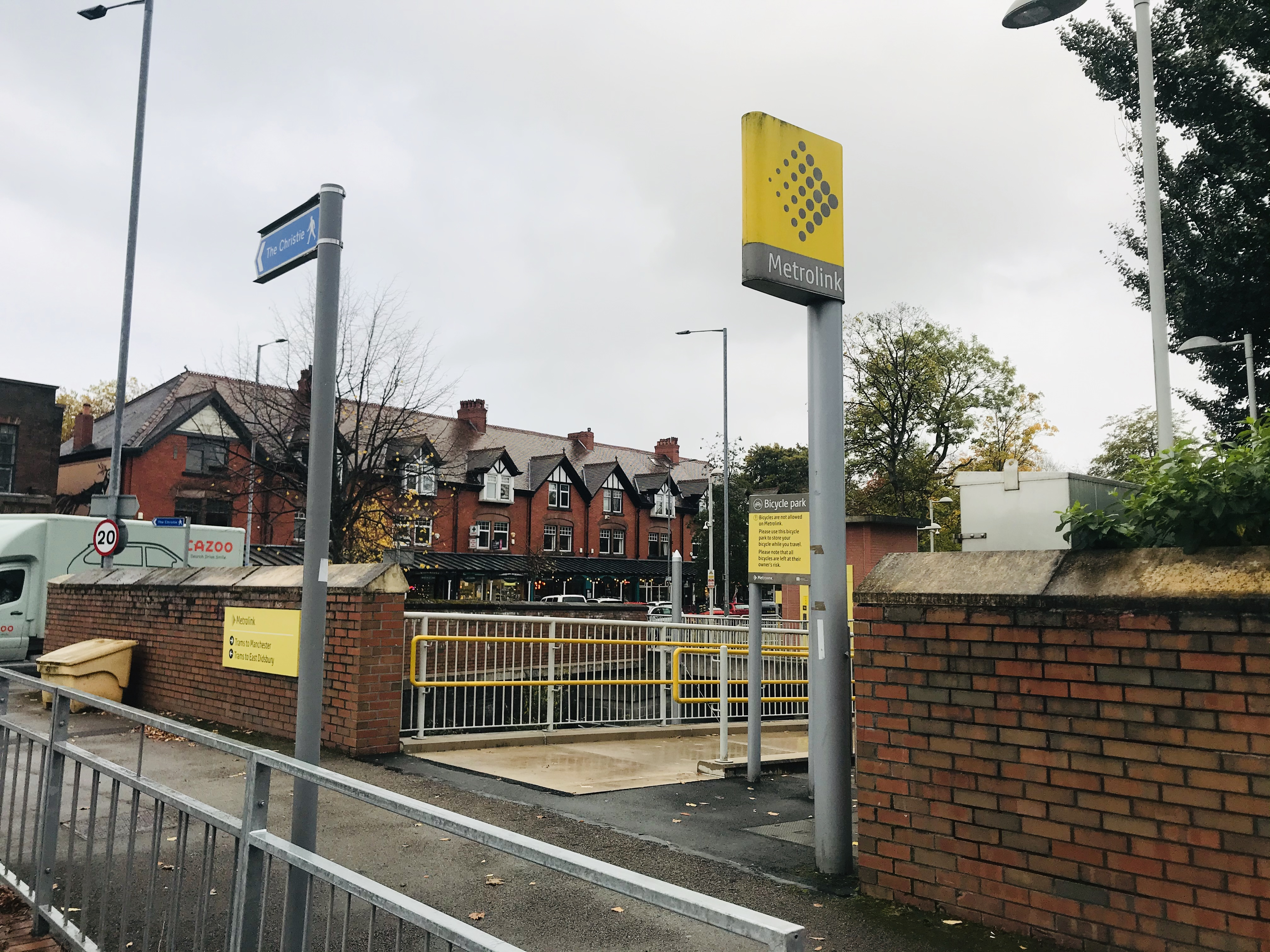
West Didsbury Metrolink stop, on the opposite side of Palatine Road

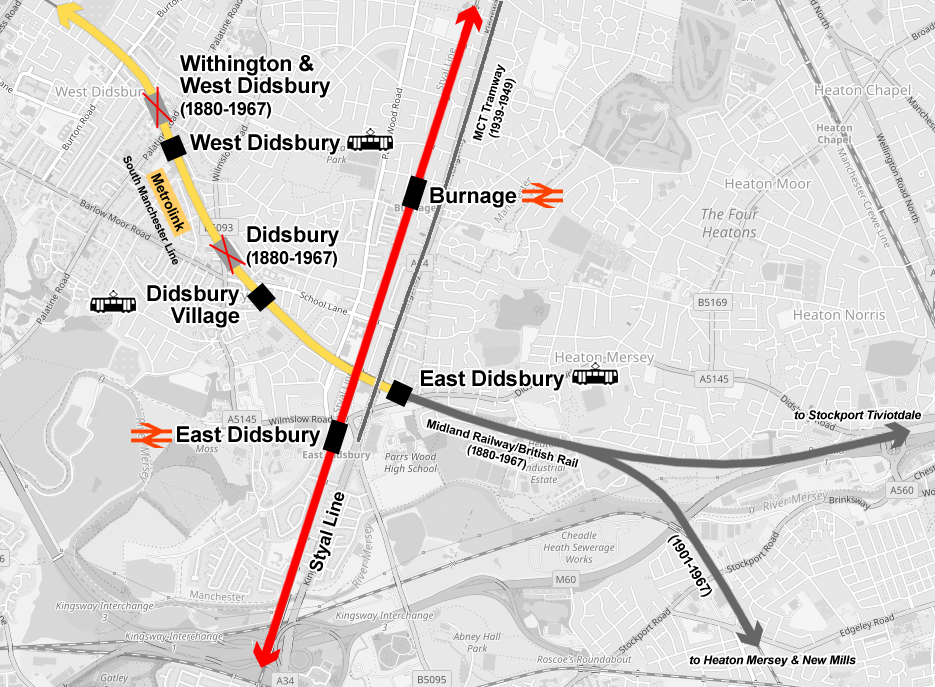
Map of railways past and present in Didsbury

== See also ==
- Sheffield and Midland Railway Companies' Committee
- Transport in Manchester
