= Allport (surname) =

Allport is a surname. Notable people with the surname include:

- Alan Allport (born 1970), British historian
- Alfred Allport (1867–1949), English rugby union player
- Carolyn Allport (c. 1950 – 2017), Australian historian and activist
- Chris M. Allport (born 1977), American composer, conductor, filmmaker, actor
- Christopher Allport (1947–2008), American actor
- Floyd Henry Allport, (1890–1978) American psychologist
- Gordon Allport, (1897–1967) American psychologist
- Harry Allport (1873–?), English footballer
- James Joseph Allport (1811–1892), English railway manager
- (James) Russell Allport (d. 1914), Australian electrical engineer in Hobart, Tasmania.
- Lily Allport (1860–1949), Australian artist
- Mary Morton Allport (1806–1895), English-Australian artist
- Morton Allport (1830–1878), Australian naturalist and solicitor
- Samuel Allport (1816–1897), English petrologist
- Walter Webb Allport (1824–1893), American dentist
