= Edward J. Steele =

Australian molecular immunologist

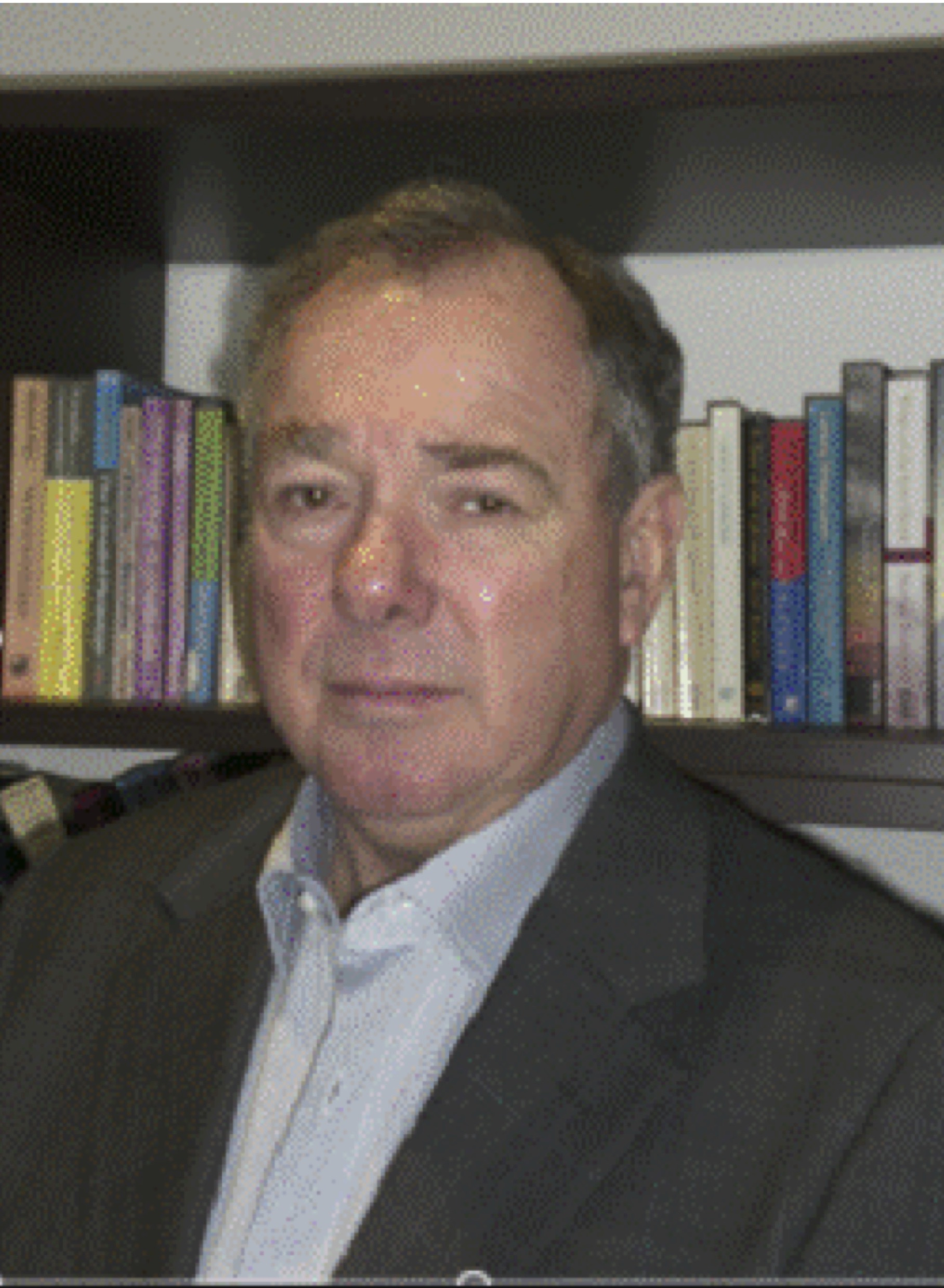
- Born: 27 October 1948 (age 78); Darwin, Australia
- Citizenship: Australian
- Known for: Somatic Hypermutation
- Scientific career
- Fields: Biology; Virology
- Workplaces: University of Adelaide [1971-1975], University of Toronto (Ontario Cancer Institute) [1977-1980], Australian National University (John Curtin School of Medical Research [1975-1977, 1981-1985], University of Wollongong [1985-2003], CYO’Connor ERADE Foundation 24 Genomics Rise, Piara Waters, WA, Australia[2009-2010, 2014 - ]
- Doctoral advisor: Professor Derrick Rowley, Department of Microbiology, University of Adelaide 1970 -1975 Qualifications : BSc (Hons), PhD, ASCIA, AIMS, ASI ( Membership Key = ASCIA- Australian Society of Clinical Immunology and Allergy; AIMS, Australian Institute of Medical Sciences; ASI – Australian Society for Immunology)

Edward J. "Ted" Steele is an Australian molecular immunologist with interests in virology and evolution. He is an honorary research associate at the C.Y.O'Connor ERADE Village Foundation in Piara Waters, WA, Australia.

== Scientific interests ==
Ted Steele hypothesized the RNA/RT-based mechanism of somatic hypermutation.

This is known as neo-Lamarckism. Steele's hypothesis provided the first mechanism to explain Lamarckian evolution: when successful somatic cell changes occur due to environmental changes, copies of the copious new messenger-RNA that have been produced by the successful cells are picked up by harmless retroviruses acting as gene shuttles and transported across the tissue barrier – the Weismann Barrier – to the germline. Finally, the new genetic information is integrated into the DNA by a process involving reverse transcription. This process of writing or translating new information into the DNA provides the essential precursor to acquired changes being passed on to progeny; to the next generation, thereby demonstrating Lamarckian inheritance of acquired characters. Darwinian natural selection then goes to work on the progeny and subsequent generations: those fit for survival do so and those not fit die out. This recombination of Darwin and Lamarck by Steele has been described as meta-Lamarckism.

During the 1980s and 1990s, Ted Steele clashed with the scientific establishment, particularly in the UK, over this hypothesis and his support for Lamarck's place in modern science. Steele has stated publicly in an interview with the ABC program Lateline that his controversial theories have had a strong impact on his career: "To be branded a heretic and a pariah meant that my career to keep doing research in this area were extremely limited."

From 2010 to 2018, Ted Steele continued to explore reverse transcription as a mechanism to explain the emergence of complex retroviruses of vertebrate lines at or just before the Cambrian Explosion of ～500 Ma.

=== Dismissal and dispute ===
In January 2001, Steele made several allegations to the media in regard to 'soft' marking resulting in the upgrading of full fee paying international students. Steele was summarily dismissed by UoW's Vice-Chancellor Gerard Sutton, stating that the university's reputation was "placed at a serious and imminent risk as a result of Associate Professor Steele's claims." Steele declared his dismissal unfair and instituted legal proceedings. The case received wide media coverage.

In August 2001, the Australian Federal Court found that the University of Wollongong had breached its staff enterprise agreement by not following correct conduct and dismissal procedures in Steele's case. Following the verdict Steele expressed publicly that he wanted his job back.

On 5 April 2002, UoW Vice Chancellor Gerard Sutton acceded to NTEU demands and reinstated Steele to his position within the Department of Biological Sciences at the University of Wollongong. It was made public that Steele's reinstatement was unconditional and involved backpay. President of the National Tertiary Education Union, Carolyn Allport, announced the importance of the victory and precedent that the court's ruling set. "The NTEU has said all along that Dr Steele was dismissed illegally. The union's position has been completely vindicated by the findings of four judges of the Federal Court and Dr Steele's subsequent reinstatement. The reinstatement comes after a 15 month legal and political campaign by the NTEU. It is a victory for all NTEU members because it clearly demonstrates that university staff cannot be dismissed without a proper and fair hearing. This requirement is the fundamental protection of intellectual freedom in Australia's universities and the successful campaign to reinstate Dr Steele has reaffirmed that protection for all Australian university staff and for the community that our universities serve."

The unfair dismissal issue was resolved on 6 July 2002 when Steele and the University of Wollongong came to a confidential agreement.

=== COVID-19 ===
In 2020, Steele, along with researcher N. Chandra Wickramasinghe and others, claimed in ten research papers that COVID-19 originated from a meteor spotted as a bright fireball over the city of Songyuan in Northeast China on October 11, 2019, and that a fragment of the meteor landed in the Wuhan area, which started the first COVID-19 outbreaks. However, the researchers, including Steele, did not provide any direct evidence proving this theory. The pseudonymous science blogger Neuroskeptic, writing in Astronomy magazine, called the meteor origin theory "so remarkable that it makes the others look boring by comparison".

== Selected publications ==
- Steele, E.J.- Somatic Selection and Adaptive Evolution: On the Inheritance of Acquired Characters. 2nd Edition. Revised with an author's Postscript, University of Chicago Press, Chicago, 1981.
- Steele, E.J., Lindley, R.A. & Blanden, R.V. Lamarck's Signature: How retrogenes are changing Darwin's natural selection paradigm. Allen & Unwin, Frontiers of Science: Series Editor Paul Davies, Sydney, Australia, 1998. In the US, published by Addison-Wesley-Longman under Perseus Book imprint, Reading, MT, 1998
- Honeywill, Ross - Lamarck's Evolution: two centuries of genius and jealousy. Pier 9 (Murdoch Books), Sydney. 2008

== See also ==
- Marion J. Lamb
- Eva Jablonka
