= Manchester South District Railway =

Former British railway operator

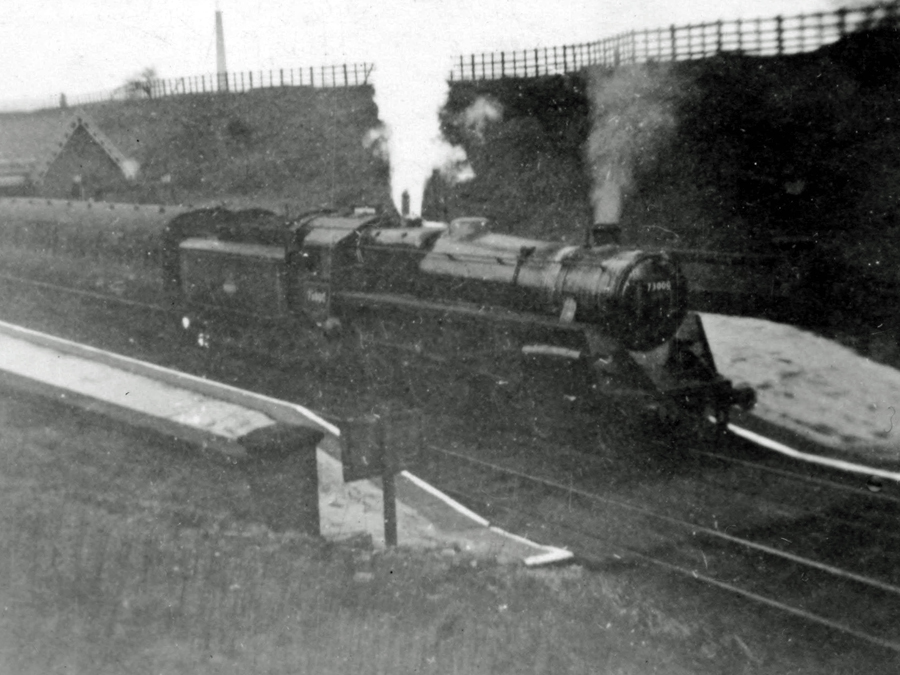
- A 5MT 73000 at Heaton Mersey in 1951

Overview
- Status: Closed/partially converted to light rail
- Owner: Midland Railway/British Rail
- Locale: Manchester, UK
- Termini: Cornbrook, Manchester; Stockport
- Stations: 6

Service
- Type: Commuter rail/Express line
- System: British Rail

History
- Opened: 1 January 1880
- Track removed: 1969
- Re-opening (to Chorlton): 7 July 2011
- Re-opening (to East Didsbury): 23 May 2013
- Closed: 2 January 1967

Technical
- Track gauge: 1,435 mm (4 ft 8 1/2 in) standard gauge

The Manchester South District Railway (MSDR) was a British railway company that was formed in 1873. It was formed by a group of landowners and businessmen in the south of Manchester, England, with the purpose of building a new railway line through the city's southern suburbs.

After some commercial difficulties, the MSDR line was eventually built by the Midland Railway and opened in 1880. A section of the line became part of the Cheshire Lines Committee and it was later absorbed into British Rail in 1948. The line was closed in the 1960s as part of the Beeching cuts. In the 2010s the line was partially reopened as part of the Manchester Metrolink network, and today forms the South Manchester Line.

== History ==
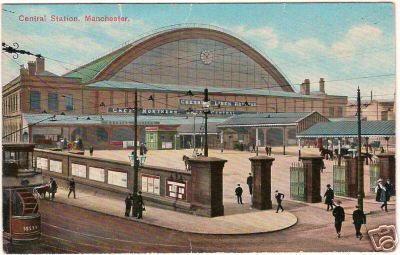
Postcard of Manchester Central c.1905

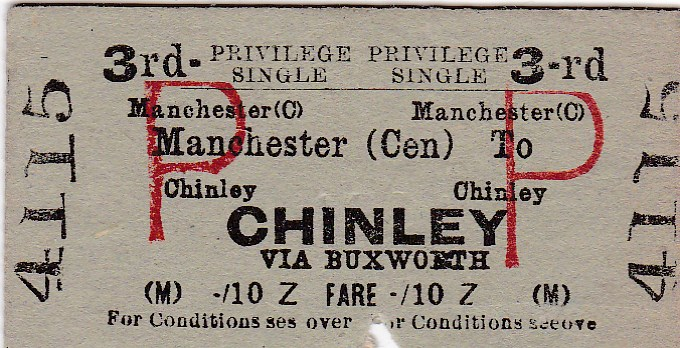
Services from Manchester to the Peak District were possible via the MSDR, as shown by this 1966 ticket from Manchester Central to Chinley

The mid-19th century was a time of rapid expansion of Britain's railway network and new lines were being planned around major cities such as Manchester.

Manchester South District Railway Act 1873
- Act of Parliament
- Parliament of the United Kingdom
- Long title: An Act for making a Railway between Manchester, in the county of Lancaster, and Alderley, in the county of Chester, with Branches therefrom; and for other purposes.
- Citation: 36 & 37 Vict. c. ccxxii

Dates
- Royal assent: 5 August 1873

Text of statute as originally enacted

Manchester South District Railway Act 1874
- Act of Parliament
- Parliament of the United Kingdom
- Long title: An Act to enable the Manchester South District Railway Company to abandon portions of their authorised undertaking, and to construct new Railways; and for other purposes.
- Citation: 37 & 38 Vict. c. lxiii

Dates
- Royal assent: 30 June 1874

Text of statute as originally enacted

A group of landowners in South Manchester formed the Manchester South District Railway to develop a line through the local area. By creating a new rapid link to the economic centre of Manchester they hoped to attract prosperity to the growing outer districts. Their intended route would run from a planned junction at Cornbrook in central Manchester to Alderley, Cheshire, passing through the southern Lancashire villages of Chorlton-cum-Hardy, Withington and Didsbury, and on into Cheshire through Gatley and Styal. The MSDR company was sanctioned by act of Parliament, the Manchester South District Railway Act 1873 (36 & 37 Vict. c. ccxxii), on 5 August 1873, but progress on the new line stalled for years.

Development of the delayed MSDR line was eventually made possible as a result of the fierce competition between two railway companies on the lucrative long-distance Manchester-London route. The first line between the two cities had been opened in 1840 by the Manchester and Birmingham Railway, and the company was absorbed six years later into the LNWR. The LNWR's competitor, the Midland Railway (MR) sought to capture the profitable Manchester-London market by opening up its own railway line. Its route through the Peak District proved difficult to construct, and lacking its own line into central Manchester, the MR was forced to share the congested Manchester London Road railway station with the LNWR for several years. In 1876, the Midland was served notice on its access to London Road, and faced with eviction, the company was compelled to develop a new route into the city.

In its quest for its own independent line into the city, the MR considered an 1864 scheme of the Manchester and Cheadle Railway to build a railway line from Old Trafford to Heaton Mersey, passing through the suburbs of Old Trafford, Hough End and longside the River Mersey via Church of St James, Didsbury to a junction with the Stockport, Timperley and Altrincham Junction Railway. This proposal was eventually aborted, but the Manchester South District Railway's 1873 scheme emerged as a viable plan.

To build the line, the Midland tried to set up a joint venture with the Great Northern and the Manchester, Sheffield and Lincolnshire Railways, but disagreements over funding delayed the project. The Midland eventually took the decision to take over the entire MSDR scheme alone. Powers to build the line were transferred to the Manchester and Stockport Railway by the Midland Railway (Further Powers) Act 1876 (39 & 40 Vict. c. ccix), and the Midland Railway (Further Powers) Act 1877 (40 & 41 Vict. c. lxxxvi) vested the MSDR in a joint railway, the Sheffield and Midland Railway Companies' Committee on 11 August 1877.

The Midland was also a partner in another joint railway, the Cheshire Lines Committee (CLC) which was building its own railway terminus, Manchester Central. A new junction was constructed at Throstle Nest near Cornrook, connecting the new MSDR to the CLC's Liverpool–Manchester lines; this would enable trains from the MSDR line to run into central Manchester and terminate at Central Station. The Manchester South District Line opened on 1 January 1880. More importantly for the Midland, this development opened up a new long-distance route to the south, and the Midland Railway closed its operation at London Road station on 1 August 1880, moving all its services to Central Station. Initially, trains terminated at a temporary Free Trade Hall Station until the main station opened in July 1880.

The new route proved successful, and the Midland ran express trains from Manchester Central to London St Pancras calling at Didsbury. The Great Northern commenced a passenger express from Manchester Central to London King's Cross in 1899.

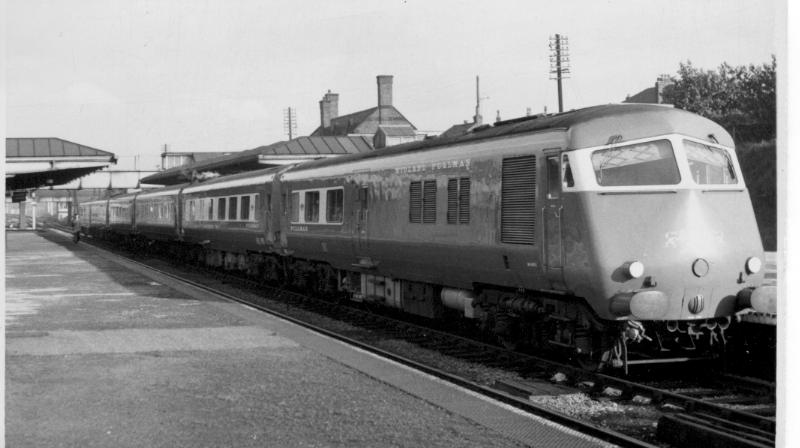
A British Rail Midland Pullman at Cheadle Heath in 1960

On 1 October 1901 a new line was opened enabling the Midland to run trains along the MSDR via Cheadle Heath, Hazel Grove, Bugsworth and Chinley, and opening a new southern route for its London express trains. By 1910, the Midland was also operating additional services to Derby and Sheffield.

From 1923, the MR was absorbed into the LMS, and after 1948 the line became part of British Rail. In the postwar period, suburban services on the South District Line declined in frequency. In the late 1950s, British Rail introduced the new Blue Pullmans Manchester-London express train which called at Cheadle Heath.

=== Closure ===
When the former LNWR line from Manchester Piccadilly became the principal route for London express trains, the South District Line lost its importance; the route and its stations were listed for closure in the Beeching cuts. Passenger services on the Manchester South District Line ceased after 1 January 1967. The line remained in use for freight and other uses until all of the MSDR's track east of Chorlton Junction was closed to all traffic after 17 August 1969 and lifted in 1970. The Fallowfield Loop continued to operate as a freight line following this and closed later in 1988.

After closure, the suburban stations fell derelict and were eventually demolished. Manchester Central was mothballed and eventually repurposed as an exhibition centre, the G-Mex in 1986.

=== Metrolink re-opening ===
The Manchester South District Line lay derelict for several decades. In 1984, Greater Manchester Council and GMPTE announced the Project Light Rail scheme to develop a new light rail/tram system by re-opening a number of disused railway lines in the region, including part of the former MSDR line as far as East Didsbury. The first phase of the Manchester Metrolink system opened in 1992, but conversion of the MSDR line to light rail did not begin until the early 2010s. Tram tracks were laid along the former trackbed, and new trams stops were constructed, mostly at new locations, as the former Midland Railway stations had been demolished. The new Metrolink South Manchester Line opened as far as St Werburgh's Road on 7 July 2011, and the extension to East Didsbury on 23 May 2013.

Conversion to Metrolink

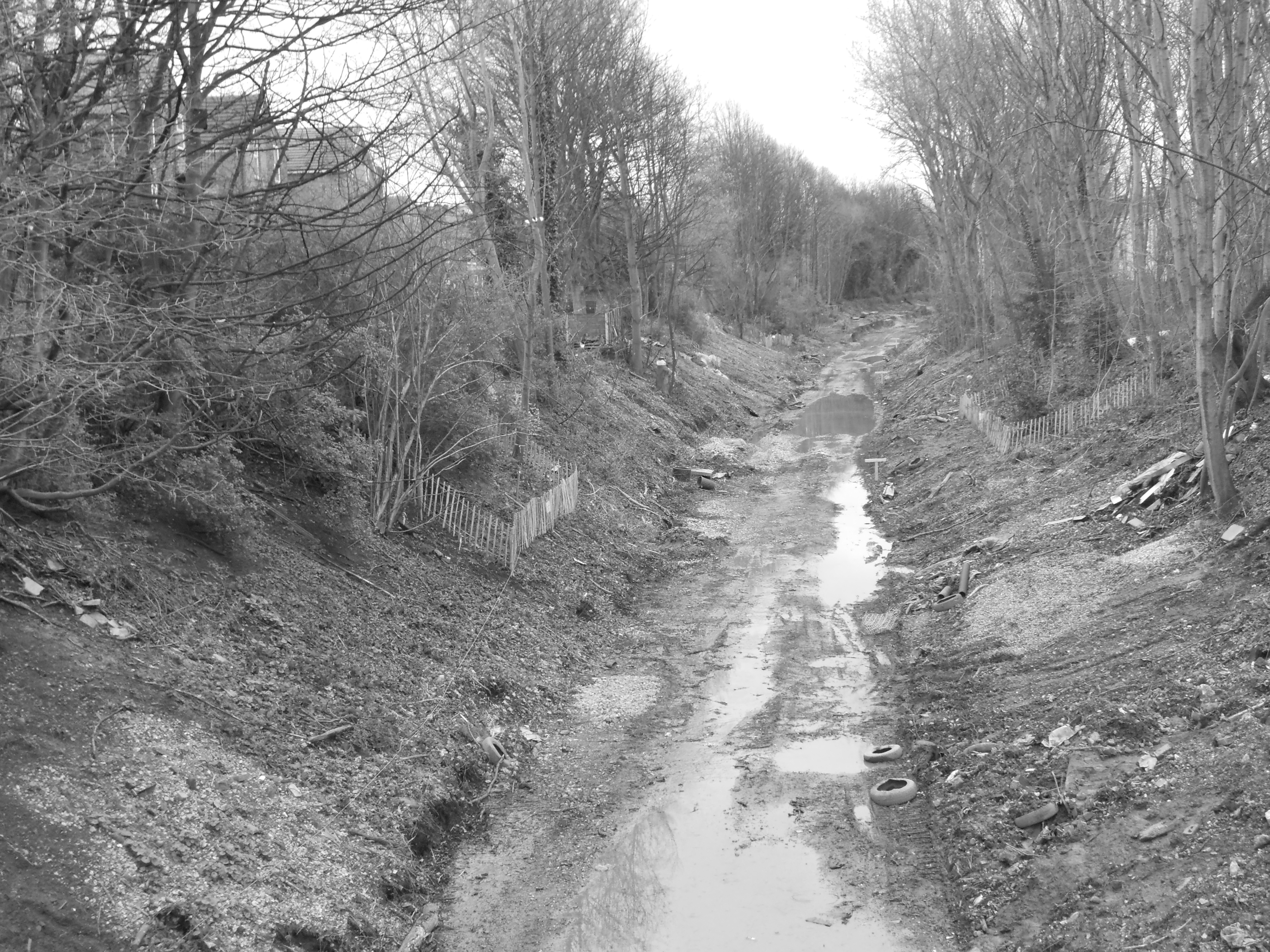
The derelict MSDR line at West Didsbury in 2011

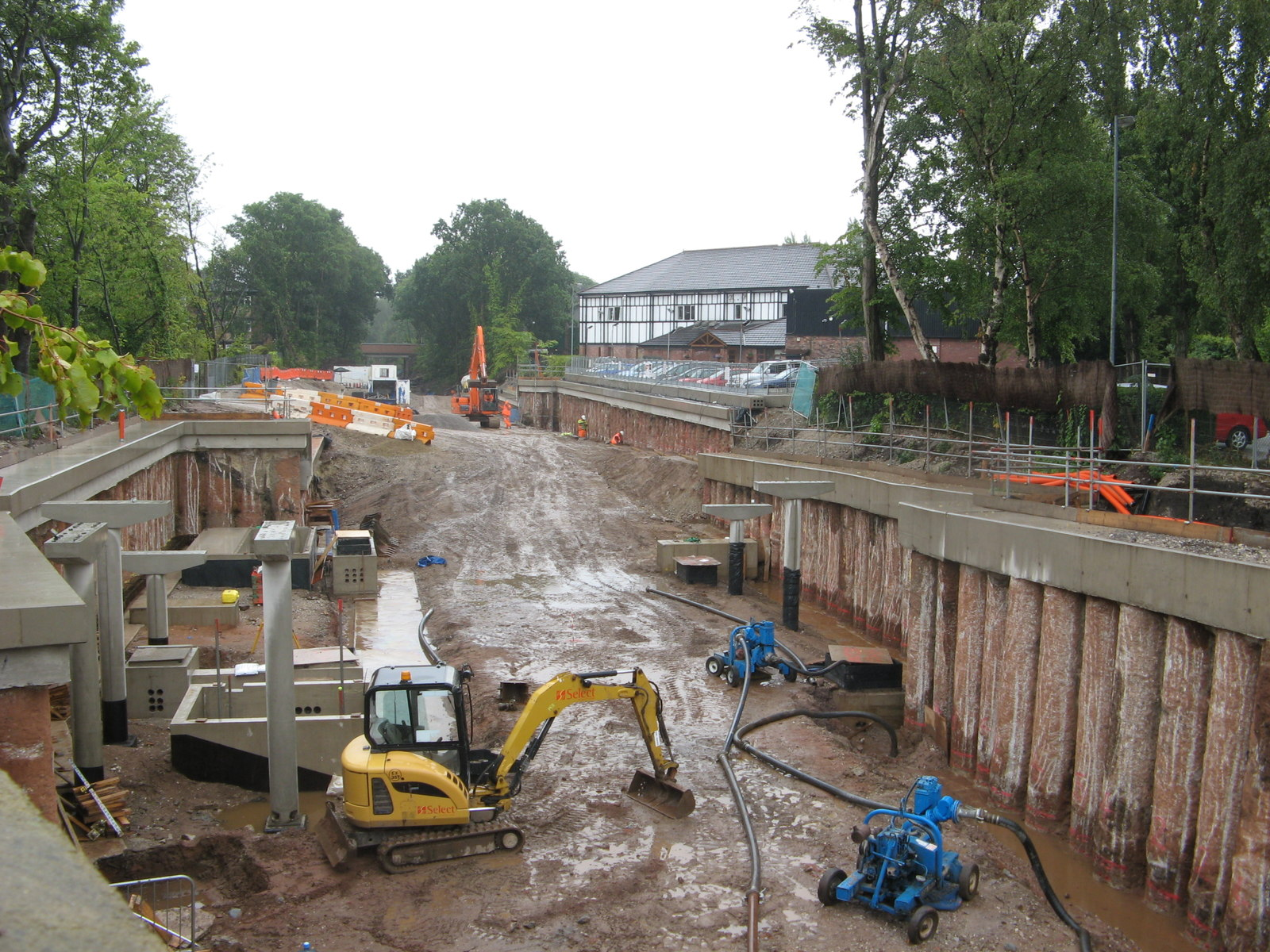
Construction of West Didsbury tram stop (2011)

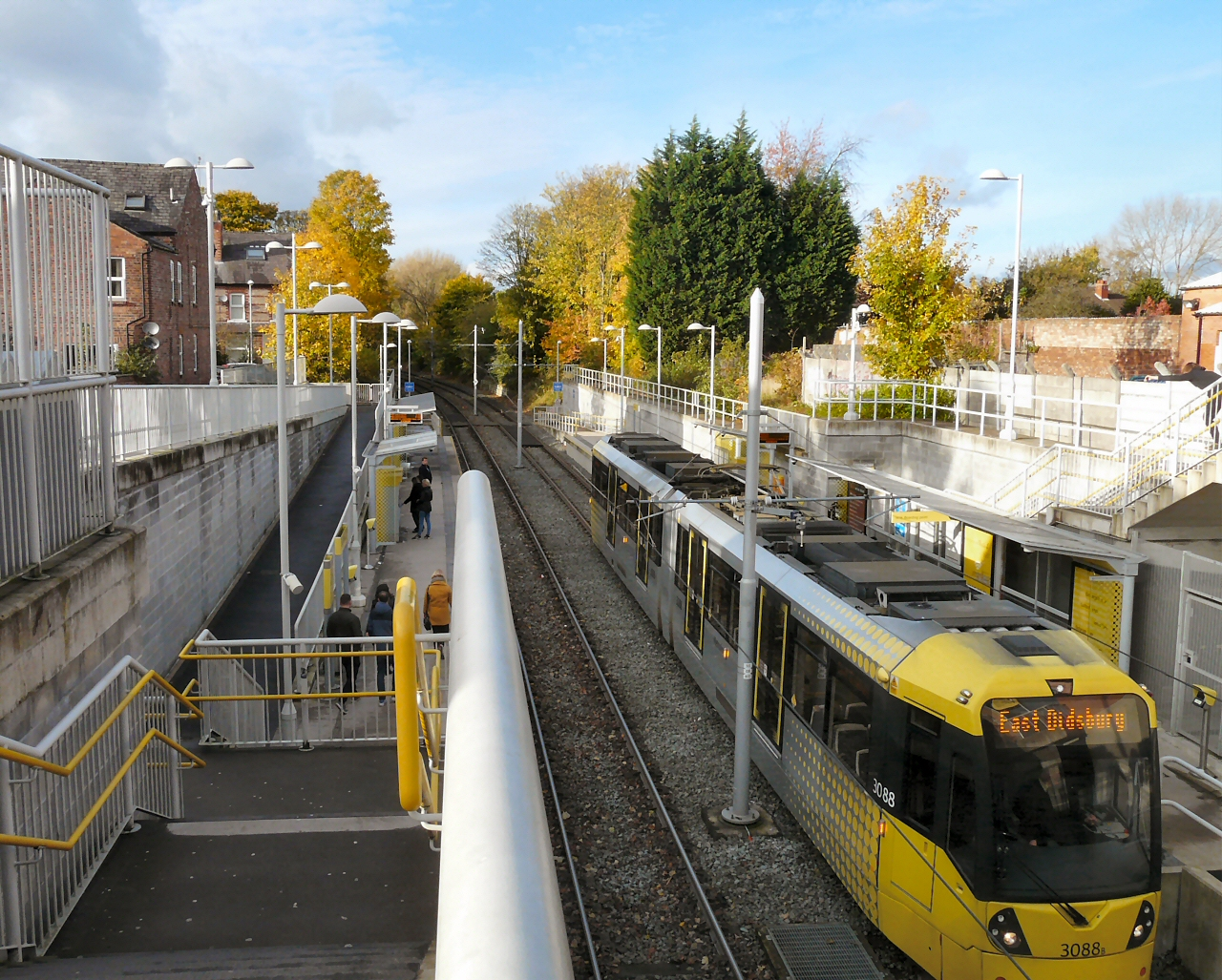
The reopened MSDR line at Burton Road

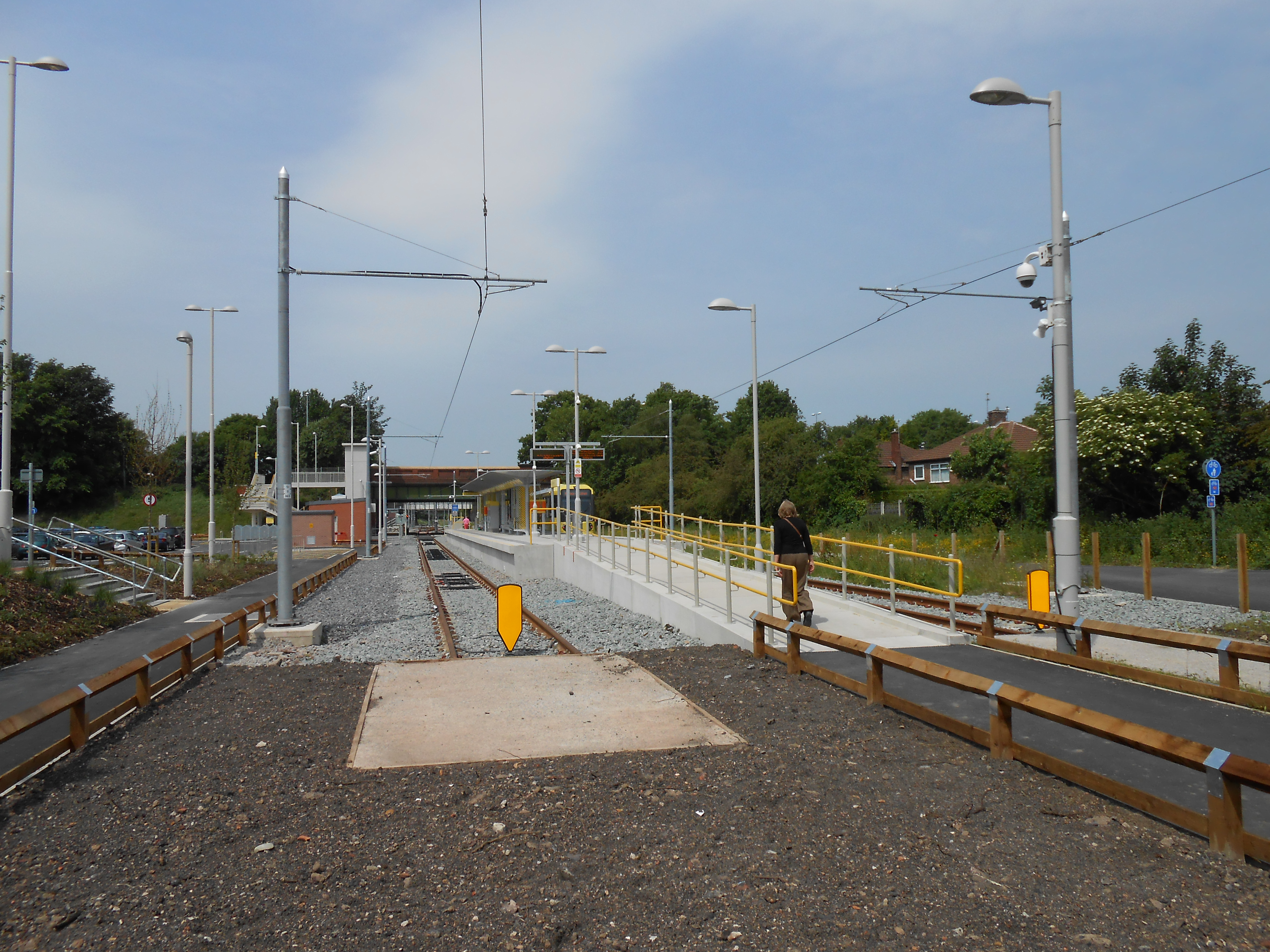
The new tram terminus at East Didsbury

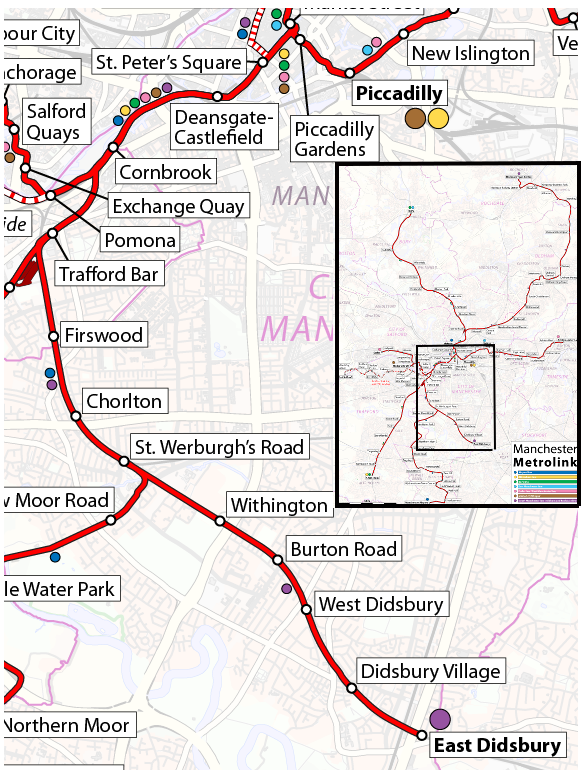
The Metrolink South Manchester Line

== Route ==
From its opening in 1880, local services were operated on the Manchester South District Line between Manchester and Stockport:

- Manchester Central
- Chorlton-cum-Hardy
- Withington
- Didsbury
- Heaton Mersey.
- Stockport Tiviot Dale
Midland stations on the MSDR

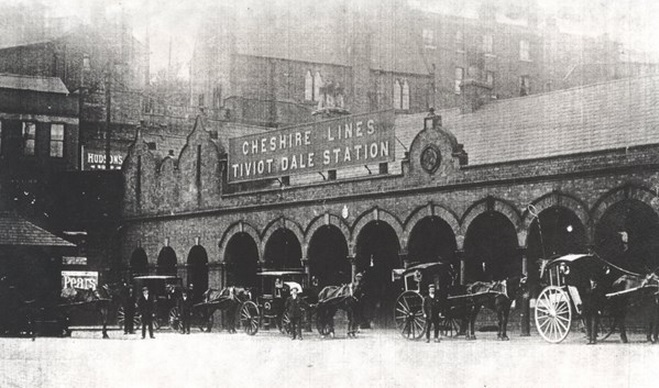
Stockport Tiviot Dale railway station c.1902

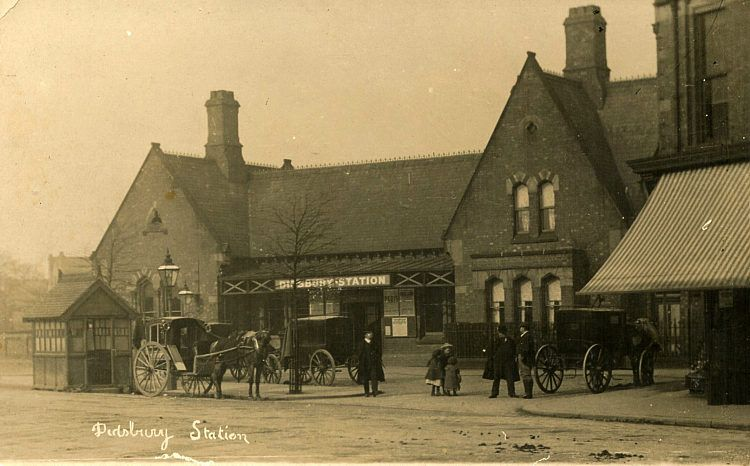
Didsbury Railway Station c.1910

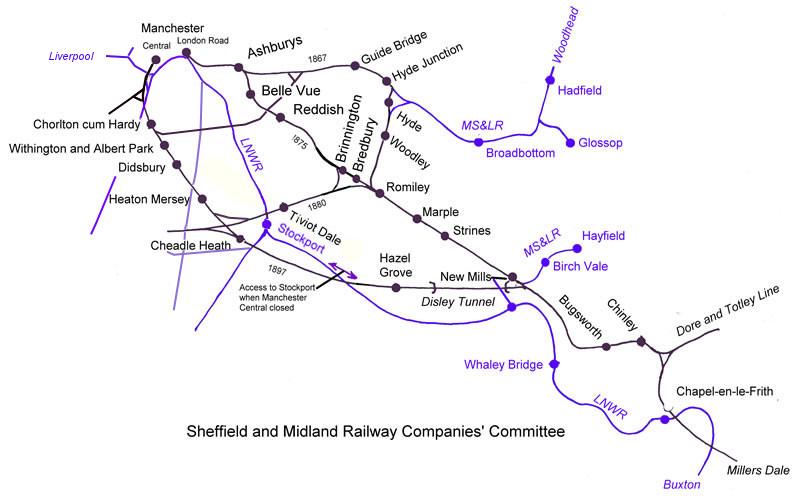
Midland to Manchester

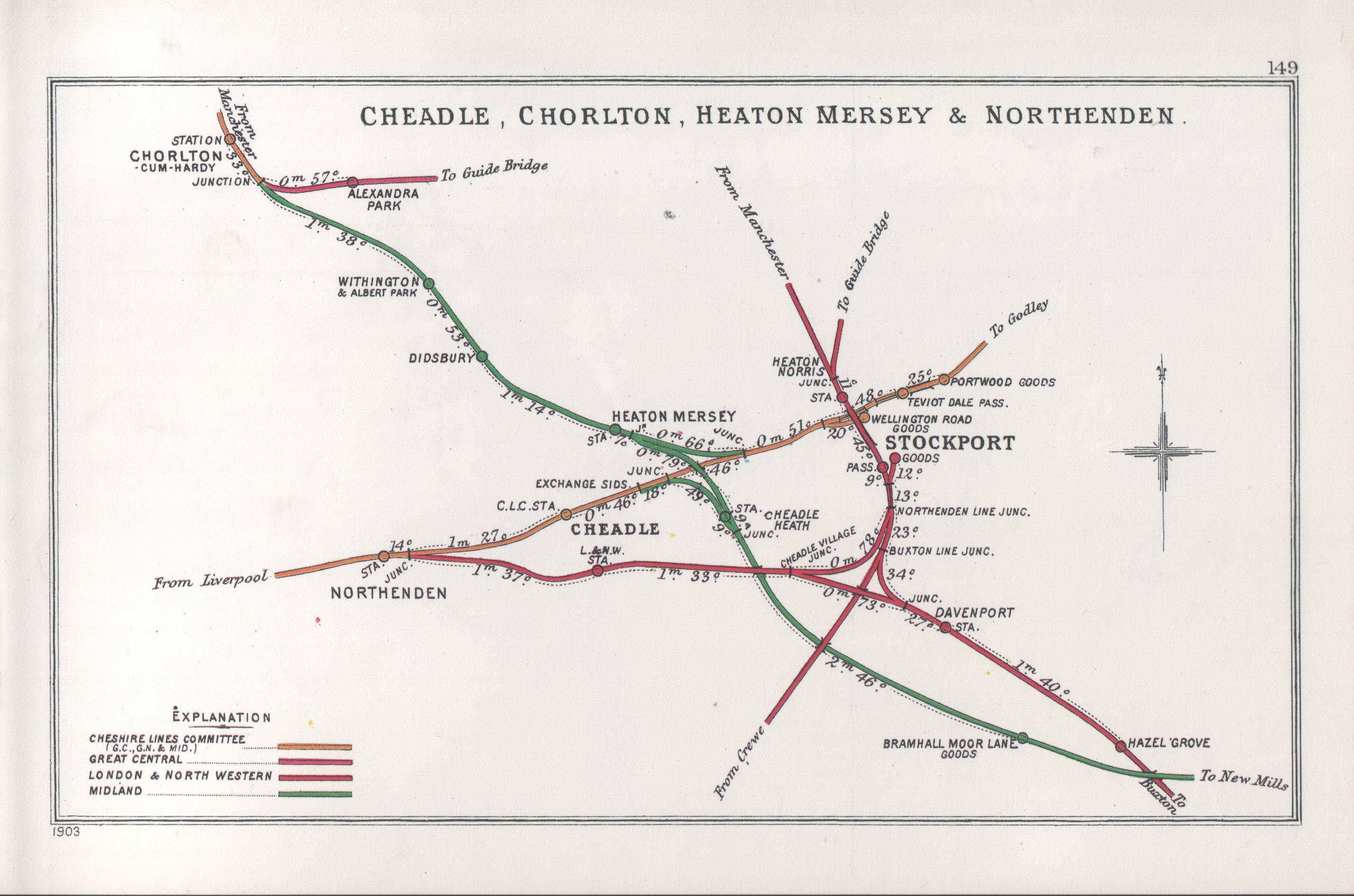
Cheadle, Chorlton, Heaton Mersey & Northenden RJD 149
