= Allport =

Allport may refer to:

- Allport (surname)
- Allport, Arkansas, US

== See also ==
- Alport (disambiguation)
