= The Instruction of Imagination =

Linguistics book

- Author: Daniel Dor
- Language: English
- Publisher: Oxford University Press
- Publication place: United Kingdom
- Media type: Print
- Pages: 280
- ISBN: 9780190256623

The Instruction of Imagination: Language as a Social Communication Technology is a 2015 book by Daniel Dor. In it, Dor proposes a new theoretical characterization of language as a social communication technology, collectively constructed for the specific function of the instruction of imagination. It makes four foundational arguments:

- Language is social: it is a property of the social network, and the product of a collective process of invention and development. It resides between speakers, not in them, at a level of organization and complexity that transcends the individual mind.
- Language is a communication technology: it develops, propagates and changes like other communication technologies humans have invented, such as the book, fax, telephone, and social media. Its modus operandi is best analyzed in technological terms.
- Language is designed for the specific function of the instruction of imagination: unlike other systems of communication, language allows speakers to instruct their interlocutors in the process of imagining the intended experience.
- Language is collectively constructed through the continuous process of experiential mutual-identification for language: in the process, individuals systematically isolate and highlight points of commonalities between their experiences, formally mark thems, and develop mutually-identified prescriptive norms for their use as instructions for imagination.

== Synopsis ==
The first three chapters of the book are dedicated to a definitional exposition of the theory. In chapter 1, Dor presents the basic premises of the theory and positions it within the wider context of post-Chomskian linguistics, discussing also the history of the social conception of language. In chapter 2, Dor defines the specific functional strategy of language as a communication technology for the instruction of imagination, and shows how it is different from the experiential strategies employed by all other communication systems. In chapter 3, Dor presents a technical description of language – its constitutive parts, their social construction, the way they fit, and how they function together.

Chapters 4 and 5 deal with issues of meaning. Chapter 4 discusses lexical semantics: from the rise and fall of the definitional-componential approach, through the emergence of prototype theory, to the current investigation of polysemy. In chapter 5, Dor presents a re-interpretation of the question of linguistic relativity as a question about the dialectic influence of a technology on its users.

Chapter 6 contains a more detailed discussion of the processes involved in the production and comprehension of linguistic utterances. In chapter 7, Dor discusses how his theory handles syntactic complexity, claiming that syntactic complexity is socially-constructed and specifically suited for the instruction of imagination.

Chapter 8 focuses on linguistic diversity, and shows how the theory re-conceptualizes the universality of language as a foundationally social fact – as opposed to a cognitive one. In chapter 9, Dor argues that language acquisition is essentially a collective enterprise, taking as important case studies the invention of sign languages such as Nicaraguan Sign Language and Al-Sayyid Bedouin Sign Language.

Chapter 10 presents a new hypothetical explanation of the evolution of language as a collectively-constructed communication technology. Based on his work with Eva Jablonka, Dor suggests a culturally-driven process of gene-culture coevolution, in which the specific function of the instruction of imagination was collectively invented.

== Central Concepts ==
=== Experiential and instructive communication ===
Dor's theory of language is rooted in the assumption that the experiences of animals (including humans) are significantly different from one another—that they are essentially private. The differences between private experiences generate what Dor calls experiential gaps. He defines intentional communication as an attempt to overcome that gap.

Dor argues that apart from language, all intentional communication systems are experiential: the communicator translates her communicative intent into a perceptible output which the interlocutor experiences directly. In other words, these systems rely on shared experience, and experiential communication remains limited to the here-and-now.

Language uses a different strategy: the communicator provides the receiver with a coded set of instructions for imagination, which the receiver is meant to use as a scaffold for imagining the communicator's experience. The receiver, by analyzing the code and recombining his own past experiences, creates a new, imagined experience. Thus, speakers can share experiences outside the here-and-now - things that happened, that could conceivably happen, inner thoughts and emotions, and outright lies. It is this unique strategy, Dor argues, which sets language apart, and makes it an extremely powerful communication technology.

=== Experiential mutual identification ===
Language is constructed through an iterative social process called experiential mutual identification. At its core, this communicative process can be used to reduce experiential gaps. If, for example, A perceives an object in his environment which he thinks B should notice as well, he can point to that object until B notices - now that are both aware of it, and the experiential gap is smaller.

The same process can be used with the tentative use of symbols. An elementary example of mutual-identification for language is when a child points at something, wishing for his parents to notice it, and calling it by a name. The child is in fact attempting to align his experience with that of his parents, and to verify that they are translating that experience into language in the same way. Humans engage in acts of mutual-identification throughout their lives, constantly testing and affirming the way in which their experiences are translated into language.

=== Symbolic landscape ===
Dor defines the symbolic landscape as a semantic web formed out of past language events, modelling in its inner dynamics the world of private experience, only in a more simplified, normative way. Every lexical item in the symbolic landscape is a discrete instructor of the imagination, and is semantically connected to other lexical items in the landscape.

Private experience, Dor argues, is never fully aligned with the symbolic landscape, but instead the two are constantly affecting one another. Although private experience is to some extent primed towards linguistic expression, some aspects of it inevitably remain inexpressible. This inherent discrepancy between the two means that the work of mutual identification for language is never finished, and partially explains humans’ compulsive need to share their experiences.

=== Mimetic origins of language ===
Dor builds on Merlin Donald’s theory of mimetic communication, an hypothesized precursor of language which included manual, facial, vocal and bodily gestures that were both intentional and representational, but were not compositional or arbitrary. This form of communication, Dor argues, evolved along with a growing codependency of humans, who became increasingly dependent on social learning and cooperative activities (tool-making, hunting and foraging, as well as alloparenting). Critically, mimetic communication and increased prosociality would have allowed for more frequent and elaborate mutual identification. Dor suggests that these developments would eventually initiate an evolutionary spiral: new cooperative behaviors would continuously require upgrades to the communication technology, these upgrades would enable new cooperative behaviors and increase codependence, which would require further communicative upgrades, and so on. This background is hypothesized to have provided the scaffold for a new communication technology, based on an instructive rather than an experiential strategy, and allowing humans to communicate about things that are beyond their shared experiential environment.

=== Culturally-driven evolution of language ===
Dor, along with Eva Jablonka, and based on evolutionary developmental biology, developed a theory of language evolution in which cultural learning and invention are hypothesized to have preceded and to have guided changes in the genome and epigenome. As described by West-Eberhard, the adaptive evolution of novelties can be initiated with a plastic, phenotypic response by the organism to a new environmental input. If the environmental input is recurring, a subpopulation capable of responding to it can be selected - that is, adaptive variation in the regulation, form, or side effects of the plastic trait is selected, in a process otherwise known as genetic accommodation. As West-Eberhard writes, this ‘phenotype first’ mode of evolution differs from the standard Neo-Darwinian approach in that genes are followers, not leaders, in evolution. In the case of language evolution, Dor and Jablonka suggest it might have originated with collective explorations of a new communicative strategy (an instructive, imaginative one). Its gradual proliferation in human societies would have created a selective environment in which the plastic traits allowing language learning would evolve. Dor suggests a process in which humans were constantly trying to catch up with their new communication technology, and argues that the innate capacities humans currently possess are derivative, emergent, variable and partial. Dor sums up the argument thus: “First we invented language. Then language changed us.”

== Reception ==
Reviews of the book were largely favorable, with several noting the wide-ranging implications of Dor's theory, while criticism of the book suggested it under-emphasised the role of play and took an overly-essentialist approach to language.

Daniel Dennett wrote:

Daniel Dor’s remarkable book [...] analyzes language as a “social communication technology,” banishing most of the Chomskian innateness dogmas and replacing them with reverse engineering of culturally transmitted habits and dispositions [...] Dor ignores meme theory and doesn’t rely as much as he should on evolutionary processes (and free-floating rationales), but he has clearly set out a reimagined set of specs for language, filling in many details only dimly suggested by my sketchy account. I recommend it to all serious thinkers about the phenomena of language.

Brian Boyd, reviewed the book favorably, writing:

It [Dor’s theory] promises not only to change the face of the language sciences, but also to have profound implications for anthropology, biology, cultural studies, literary studies, philosophy, politics, and religion, and for our understanding of human experience [...] Dor offers much of his theory in an ample nutshell, one bold hypothesis with eight bold subhypotheses, each challenging refutation and thereby stimulating, I predict, decades of new argument, research and discovery.

Gurpinder Lalli, reviewing the book for The British Society for Literature and Science, likewise wrote:

Dor's book has the potential to establish a new foundation for a communicative socially-based linguistic theory. Dor offers a framework for bringing together the two sides of linguistics which typically form psycholinguistics and socio-linguistics, and the book is about unpacking the tensions across the cognitive-social divide that can be said to be at play in trying to theorize new constructs.

Andrzej Pawelec wrote that Dor's book challenged the cognitive perspective on language “in an unparalleled manner”, a challenge which would in time lead to a paradigm shift.
