= Daniel Dor =

Israeli linguist

- דניאל דור
- Education: Stanford University
- Scientific career
- Fields: Linguistics
- Workplaces: Tel Aviv University

Daniel Dor (Hebrew: דניאל דור) is an Israeli linguist, media researcher and political activist. He is a professor in the Dan Department of Communication in Tel Aviv University. He has written extensively on language and its evolution, as well as on the role of the media in the construction of political hegemony. His theory of language is described in The Instruction of Imagination: Language as a Social Communication Technology (2015).

== Academic career ==
Dor received his PhD in linguistics from Stanford University in 1996. He started teaching in the Department of Communication in Tel Aviv University in 1998. Since 2000, he has published a series of articles with Eva Jablonka on the evolution of language, describing a complex co-evolutionary relationship cultural evolution of language as a technology and the cognitive and biological evolution of humans. In 2004, he published Intifada Hits the Headlines: How the Israeli Press misreported the Outbreak of the Second Palestinian Uprising, which was chosen as book of the year in communication by Choice Magazine. In 2014, he co-edited “The Social Origins of Language” with Chris Knight and Jerome Lewis. In 2015, he published The Instruction of Imagination: Language as a Social Communication Technology, which presented a new framework for the description and analysis of language and its evolution.

== Activism ==
Between 2004 and 2007, Dor served as Chairman and Academic Supervisor of Keshev, the Center for the Protection of Democracy in Israel. In 2011, he founded together with Lia Nirgad The Social Guard, an NGO that maintains a civic presence in the Knesset, monitors the MKs work, and informs the public about every discussion bearing on issues of social justice in Israel.

== Selected publications ==
=== Books ===
- Dor, Daniel (2015). The Instruction of Imagination: Language as a Social Communication Technology. Oxford University Press. ISBN 9780190256623.
- Dor, Daniel; Knight, Chris; Lewis, Jerome, eds. (2014). The Social Origins of Language. Oxford University Press. ISBN 9780199665334.
- Dor, Daniel (2005). The Suppression of Guilt: The Israeli Media and the Reoccupation of the West Bank. Pluto Press. ISBN 9780745322957.
- Dor, Daniel (2005). Intifada Hits the Headlines: How the Israeli Press Misreported the Outburst of the Second Palestinian Uprising. Indiana University Press. ISBN 9780253343338.

=== Articles ===
- Dor, Daniel (2017). "The role of the lie in the evolution of human language". Language Sciences. 63: 44–59. doi:10.1016/j.langsci.2017.01.001. ISSN 0388-0001.
- Dor, Daniel (2017). "From experience to imagination: Language and its evolution as a social communication technology". Journal of Neurolinguistics. 43: 107–119. doi:10.1016/j.jneuroling.2016.10.003. ISSN 0911-6044. S2CID 53178413.
- Dor, Daniel; Jablonka, Eva (2010). "Plasticity and canalization in the evolution of linguistic communication: an evolutionary developmental approach". The Evolution of Human Language. pp. 135–147. doi:10.1017/CBO9780511817755.010. ISBN 9780521516457.
- Dor, Daniel (2010). "The Israeli Media". In Rubenberg, Cheryl (ed.). The Encyclopedia of the Israeli-Palestinian Conflict. Lynne Rienner Publications.
- Dor, Daniel (2006). "Is There Anything We Might Call Dissent in Israel? (And, If There Is, Why Isn't There?)". Critical Inquiry. 32 (2): 278–287. doi:10.1086/500704. ISSN 0093-1896. S2CID 159669301.
- Dor, Daniel (2005). "Toward a Semantic Account of that-Deletion in English". Linguistics. 43 (2). doi:10.1515/ling.2005.43.2.345. ISSN 0024-3949. S2CID 144718268.
- Dor, Daniel (2004). "From Englishization to Imposed Multilingualism: Globalization, the Internet, and the Political Economy of the Linguistic Code". Public Culture. 16 (1): 97–118. doi:10.1215/08992363-16-1-97. ISSN 1527-8018. S2CID 144471877.
- Dor, Daniel (2003). "On newspaper headlines as relevance optimizers". Journal of Pragmatics. 35 (5): 695–721. doi:10.1016/S0378-2166(02)00134-0. ISSN 0378-2166. S2CID 8394655.
- Dor, Daniel; Jablonka, Eva (2001). "From Cultural Selection to Genetic Selection: A Framework for the Evolution of Language". Selection. 1 (1–3): 33–56. doi:10.1556/Select.1.2000.1-3.5. ISSN 1585-1931.
- Dor, Daniel (2008). "From Symbolic Forms to Lexical Semantics: Where Modern Linguistics and Cassirer's Philosophy Start to Converge". Science in Context. 12 (4): 493–511. doi:10.1017/S0269889700003574. ISSN 0269-8897. S2CID 55482841.
