= Alport (disambiguation) =

Alport may refer to:

== Places ==
- Alport, a hamlet in Derbyshire, England
- River Alport, in Derbyshire, England
- Alport Castles, a landslip feature in Derbyshire, England
- Alport Height, a hill in Derbyshire, England
- Alport, a hamlet near Church Stoke in Powys, Wales
- Alport, Ontario, a town in Ontario, Canada
- Alport Town, a former district of Manchester, England

== Other ==
- Alport syndrome, a genetic disorder
- Arthur Cecil Alport, the discoverer of Alport syndrome
- Cuthbert Alport, Baron Alport, a British politician

== See also ==
- Allport (disambiguation)
