= Heaton Mersey railway station =

Former railway station in Greater Manchester, England

Heaton Mersey
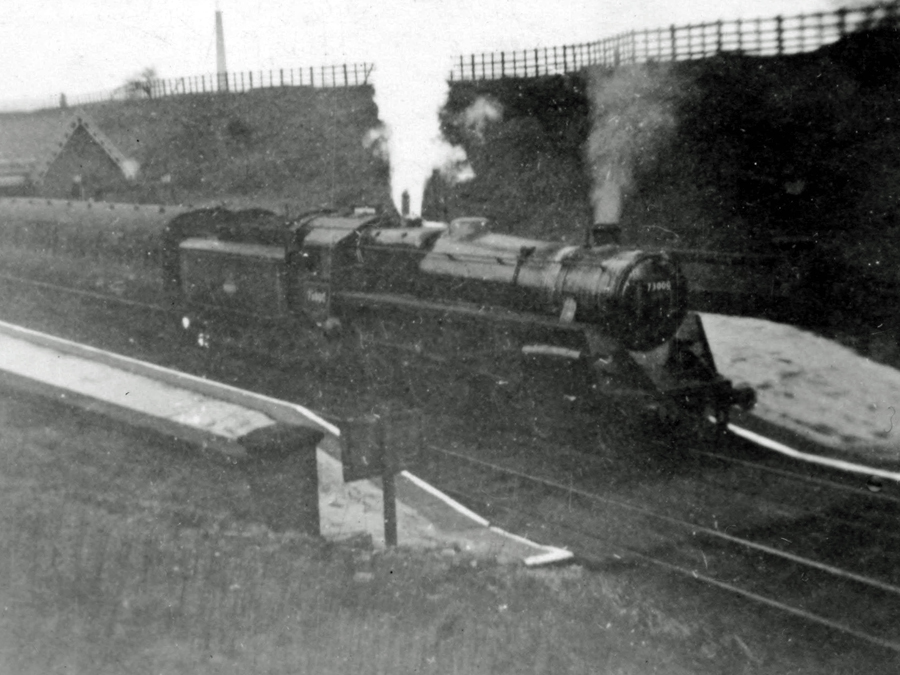
- A stopping train from Derby, 1951

General information
- Location: Heaton Mersey, Metropolitan Borough of Stockport, England
- Coordinates: 53.4107°N 2.2083°W
- Grid reference: SJ862904
- Platforms: 2

Other information
- Status: Disused

History
- Original company: Midland Railway
- Pre-grouping: Midland Railway
- Post-grouping: London, Midland and Scottish Railway

Key dates
- 1 January 1880: Station opened
- 3 July 1961: Passenger services discontinued
- 17 August 1969: Track disconnected
- 1970: Track lifted, station demolished
Location

Heaton Mersey railway station served the Heaton Mersey suburb of Stockport, in Cheshire (now Greater Manchester), England. It was a stop on the Manchester South District Line between 1880 and 1961.

== History ==
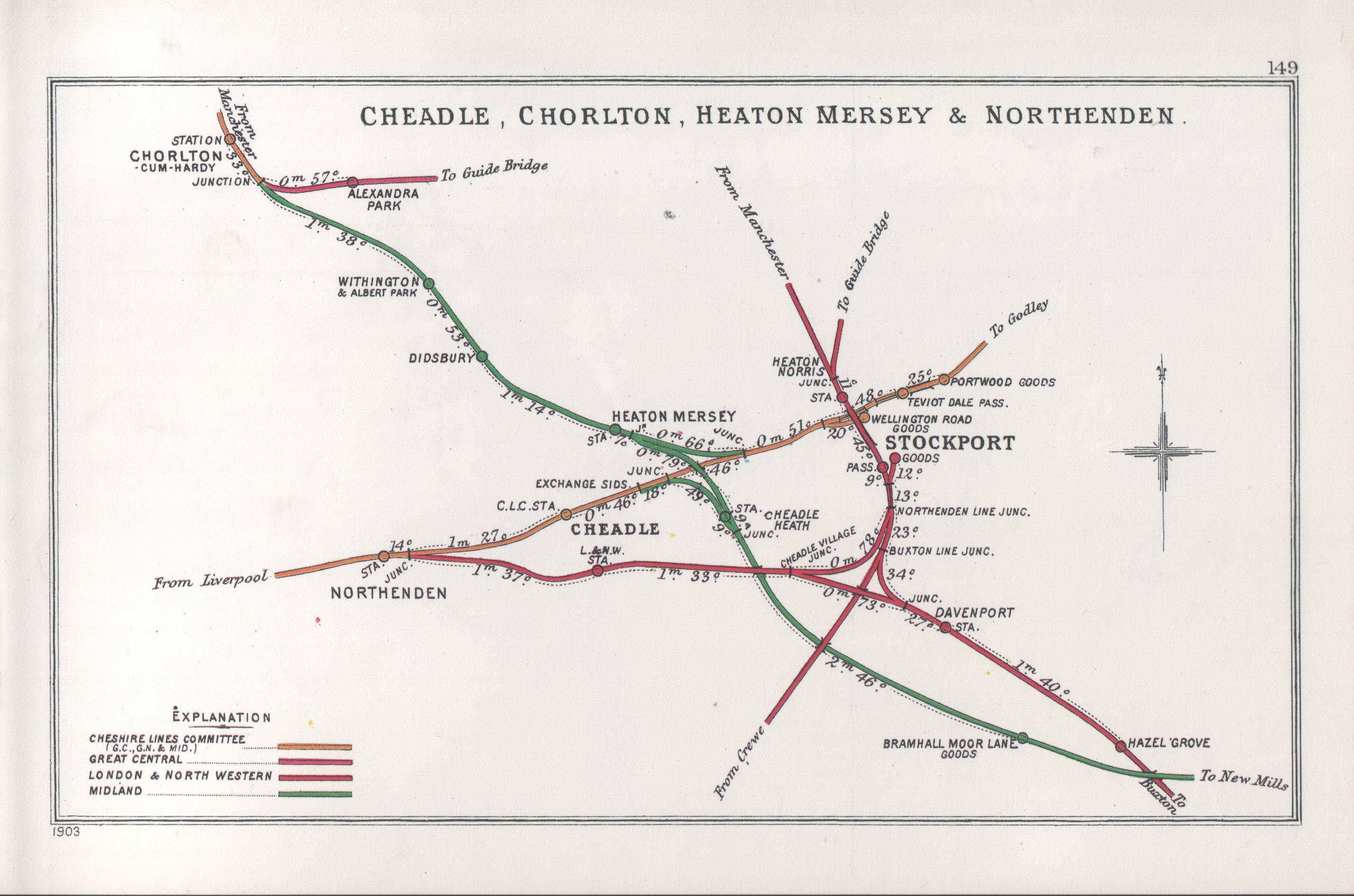
A 1903 Railway Clearing House Junction Diagram showing railways in the vicinity of Heaton Mersey (centre)

Heaton Mersey railway station was opened on 1 January 1880 by the Midland Railway and lay on the newly opened Manchester South District Line; it ran from Heaton Mersey East Junction to Chorlton Junction and on to Manchester Central.

It was situated at the southern end of Station Road, which is still extant. The station was later operated by the London Midland and Scottish Railway and was closed by the London Midland Region of British Railways on 3 July 1961.

The main station building was a substantial brick-built structure located on the east (southbound) side of the line. A footbridge led across the twin railway tracks to the northbound platform, with a smaller brick-built shelter. Station staff could use a wooden boarded crossing at the north end of the facility.

== Services ==
The station was served by local trains from Manchester Central to Cheadle Heath and to Stockport Tiviot Dale; also by secondary stopping trains from Derby. These continued to run after the closure of the station until 1967, with line closing to all traffic two years later.

Preceding station	Disused railways	Following station
Didsbury; Line and station closed	Midland Railway; South District Railway	Stockport Tiviot Dale; Line and station closed
Didsbury; Line and station closed	Midland Railway; South District Railway	Cheadle Heath; Line and station closed

== The site today ==
The station was demolished and the track lifted in 1970, with the cutting infilled to accommodate residential, commercial and industrial developments. These include the Green Pastures estate and Heaton Mersey Industrial Estate.

Some remnants of the original infrastructure remain; notably, former bridge abutments are still visible: one stands on Vale Road, facing west toward the industrial estate, while another is located within Heaton Vale Nature Park, facing south-east toward the River Mersey. A public footpath now traces the course of the former railway line, linking these surviving structures.
