= Lily Allport =

Australian artist (1860–1949)

- Born: Curzona Frances Louise Allport; 18 July 1860; Tasmania, Australia
- Died: 29 April 1949 (aged 88)
- Known for: Painting, Drawing, Watercolours, Printmaking

Curzona Frances Louise (Lily) Allport (18 July 1860 – 29 April 1949) was a Tasmanian artist.

She was born in Tasmania to Morton Allport, a solicitor and photographer, and Elizabeth Ritchie. As a child, Allport received drawing lessons from her grandmother, the artist Mary Morton Allport who is considered the first professional female artist in the Australian colonies. Determined to pursue a career in art, Allport moved to England in 1888 with her mother Elizabeth and sister Eva. Initially supported by a yearly allowance from her mother and brothers, Allport shortly became financially self-sufficient through sales of her prolific works including oil paintings, watercolours, pastel drawings and relief prints. In Europe she studied with renowned artists including Hubert Vos and Charles Wellington Furse. In 1894, The Mercury newspaper reported that Allport was the first Tasmanian artist to have works exhibited at the Royal Academy of Arts in 1893, 1894, and 1906. She worked as an instructor at the London School of Photo Engraving and Lithography.
