= Cheadle Heath railway station =

Former railway station in Greater Manchester, England

Cheadle Heath
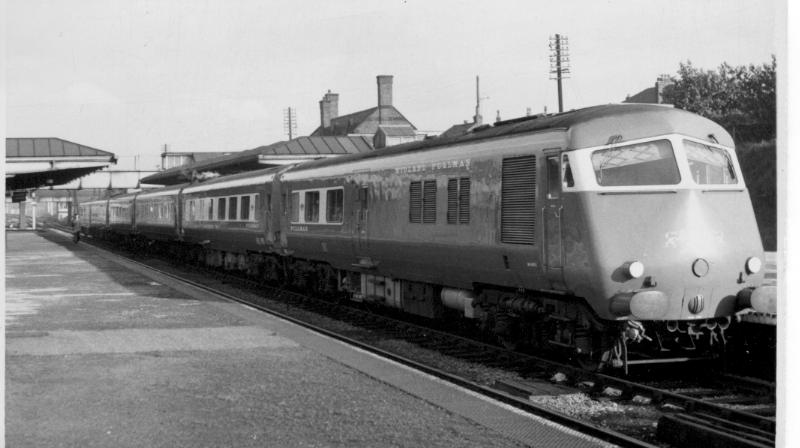
- The Blue Pullman at Cheadle Heath station on 28 September 1960

General information
- Location: Cheadle Heath, Stockport; England
- Coordinates: 53.401000°N 2.189000°W
- Grid reference: SJ875893
- Platforms: 5

Other information
- Status: Disused

History
- Original company: Midland Railway
- Pre-grouping: Midland Railway
- Post-grouping: London, Midland and Scottish Railway; London Midland Region of British Railways

Key dates
- 1 October 1901: Opened as Cheadle Heath
- 1 May 1902: Renamed Cheadle Heath for Stockport
- 1 October 1908: Renamed Cheadle Heath (Stockport)
- 14 June 1965: Renamed Cheadle Heath
- 2 January 1967: Closed to passengers
- 1 July 1968: Closed
Location

Cheadle Heath railway station was a stop on the Midland Railway's New Mills and Heaton Mersey line; it served the suburb of Cheadle Heath in Stockport, Greater Manchester, England.

== History ==
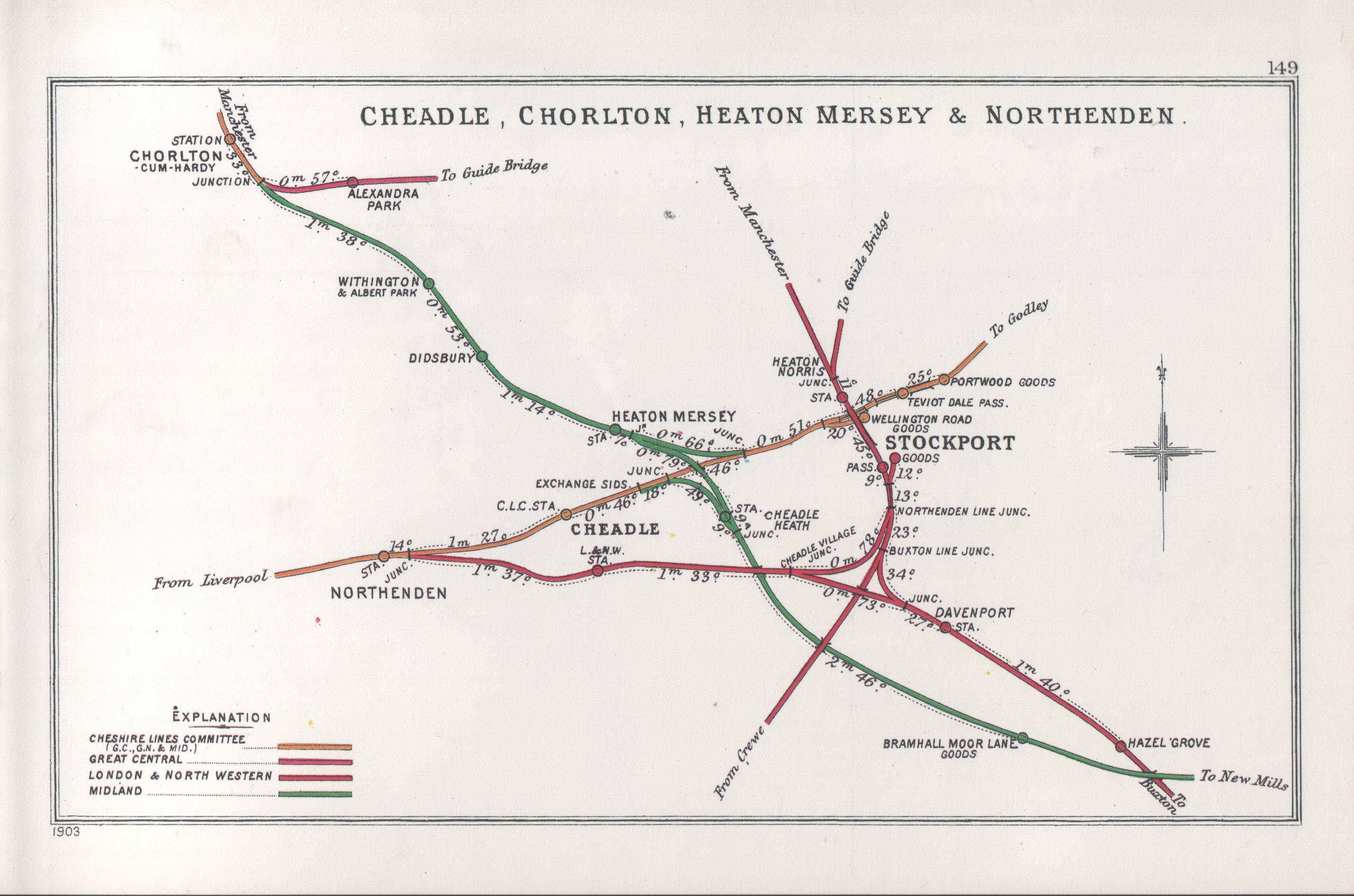
A 1903 Railway Clearing House diagram of railways in the Cheadle Heath and Stockport area, showing (in green) the Midland Railway line from Manchester Central passing through Cheadle Heath station and south-eastwards towards New Mills

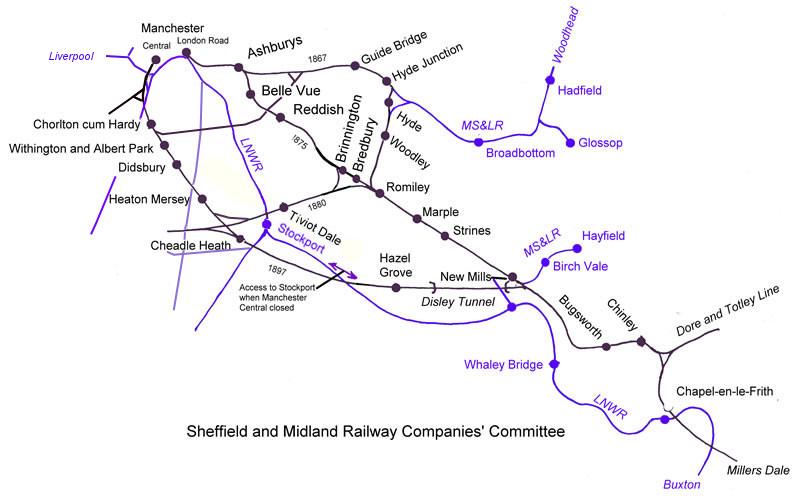
Sketch map of Midland Railway lines into Manchester

The station was built on the Midland Railway's New Mills and Heaton Mersey Line (the so-called "Disley cut off" line). The purpose of this line was to avoid the congestion and junctions of New Mills Central, Marple, Romiley and Stockport Tiviot Dale and difficult profile of the existing line, slowing down London St Pancras to Manchester Central express trains via the Manchester South District Line.

On 1 October 1901, the initial section from Heaton Mersey to Cheadle Heath opened, with a service of passenger trains to Manchester Central. The line through Disley Tunnel to New Mills South Junction was opened on 1 July 1902, enabling through services to Derby and other stations.

Initially named Cheadle Heath, it changed to Cheadle Heath for Stockport on 1 May 1902. It became Cheadle Heath Stockport on 1 October 1908 and later reverted to its original name on 14 June 1965.

The station remained open to passengers until 2 January 1967 and to goods traffic until 1 July 1968.

== Services ==
Local trains served Manchester Central and intermediate stations. The Midland Pullman operated a regular morning express service between Manchester Central and London St Pancras, with Cheadle Heath as its only stop before running non-stop to London.

Preceding station	Disused railways	Following station
Heaton Mersey; Line and station closed	Midland Railway	Hazel Grove (Midland); Line open, station closed
Cheadle North; Line and station closed	Midland Railway	Hazel Grove (Midland); Line open, station closed

== The site today ==
Most of the station's site is now occupied by a Morrisons supermarket and car park.

A single track remains and is still used by freight trains, mostly carrying limestone from quarries near Buxton to chemical factories near Northwich.

The two railway bridges across the River Mersey at Cheadle Heath North junction have been demolished; three of the four bridge heads remain, one of which is readily accessible to walkers.
