= Evolution in Four Dimensions =

2005 book about evolution

- Author: Eva Jablonka, Marion J. Lamb
- Illustrator: Anna Zeligowski
- Subject: Evolutionary biology
- Publisher: Bradford Books
- Publication date: 2005
- Pages: 480
- ISBN: 9780262101073
- OCLC: 1087677790

Evolution in Four Dimensions: Genetic, Epigenetic, Behavioral, and Symbolic Variation in the History of Life is a book by Eva Jablonka and Marion J. Lamb about evolutionary biology. First published by the MIT Press imprint Bradford Books in 2005, the book challenges the gene-centric view of evolution for what the authors consider its excessive focus on the role of DNA sequences in evolution and biological inheritance. The book's title refers to the argument made by the authors that evolution by natural selection, rather than only acting on DNA sequence variation, acts on four different systems or "dimensions": genetic, epigenetic, behavioral, and symbolic. It includes cartoon illustrations by Anna Zeligowski, an artist and physician.

== Reviews ==
Steven Rose reviewed Evolution in Four Dimensions favorably for the Guardian, describing it as "a lucid book that restores subtlety to evolutionary theory". Andrew Lloyd of St. Vincent's University Hospital reviewed the book favorably as well, describing it as "engagingly well-written" and praising the cartoon illustrations. Stuart Newman also reviewed Evolution favorably, calling it "gracefully written, in a tone that is unusually relaxed and confident given the complexity and broad range of its subject matter and the iconoclastic ideas of the authors." Michael Benton praised it as "one of the best written [books] that I have read in years: clear, succinct, thoroughly signposted, and with ample summaries and reviews of difficult areas." In a more mixed review of the 2017 revised edition, Russell Bonduriansky of the University of New South Wales argued, "Jablonka and Lamb do not quite pull off the Herculean feat of clarifying how all of these dimensions and processes [referring to the "four dimensions"] fit together into a coherent picture of evolution. Yet, this book certainly succeeds in a more modest but still important objective—to compel readers to ponder new evidence and question long-held assumptions." Similarly, Aaron D. Blackwell argued that Jablonka and Lamb propose a new theory of evolution based on the four dimensions they describe, but fail to detail what exactly such a theory would look like. Blackwell acknowledges, however, that "it is hard to fault them for this one" because "[o]ur understandings of epigenetics and cultural inheritance are still limited".
