= Hazel Grove railway station (Midland Railway) =

Former railway station in Greater Manchester, England

Hazel Grove
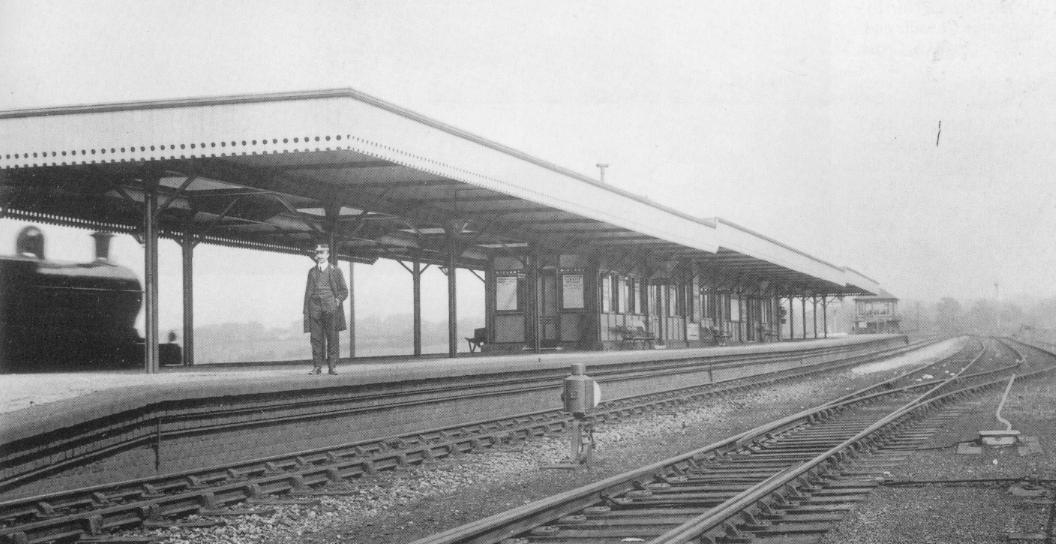
- Hazel Grove (Midland) station in 1907, looking south

General information
- Location: Hazel Grove, Stockport; England
- Coordinates: 53.3749°N 2.1074°W
- Grid reference: SJ929864
- Platforms: 2

Other information
- Status: Disused

History
- Original company: Midland Railway
- Pre-grouping: Midland Railway

Key dates
- 1 July 1902: Station opened
- 1 January 1917: Station closed
Location

Hazel Grove (Midland) was a railway station in Hazel Grove, formerly in Cheshire, England; it was in use between 1 July 1902 and 1 January 1917 on the Midland Railway's New Mills to Heaton Mersey line.

== History ==
Location within Stockport's historical rail network. (The station was located on the bottom right of the image on the dotted line before the tunnel labelled Derby, station not represented on map)

The Midland Railway (MR) opened the station on its 'Disley cut off' line (correct name: the New Mills and Heaton Mersey Line). This line was completed in 1902, to improve access of the MRs fast trains from London St Pancras to Manchester Central, via Derby.

The station was located 800 yards (730 m) south of Hazel Grove's centre, at the point where the line crossed over the Macclesfield and Buxton roads by means of two over-bridges that are still in use.

There was a siding on the up line towards New Mills for goods trains to recess into by reversing in off the main line. There was also a pair of sidings adjacent to the Down line and the station. These two sidings were also accessed by reversing back into them at the Cheadle Heath end.

Hazel Grove (Midland) signalbox was located at the New Mills end of the station and lasted until closure in March 1977 when removed thereafter.

== Service ==
The station was underused. Very few trains stopped there as it was inconveniently located, so it was closed after only 15 years of use.

Preceding station	Disused railways	Following station
Cheadle Heath; Line and station closed	Midland Railway	Buxworth; Line open, station closed

== The site today ==
Nothing remains of the station platform or subway; only the footpath leading up from Buxton Road remains with original slatted wooden Midland Railway style fencing and gates, however some of this has now been lost due to a nearby car wash development.

== See also ==
- Hazel Grove railway station
