= Marion J. Lamb =

English biologist (1939–2021)

- Born: 29 July 1939; Suffolk, England
- Died: 12 December 2021 (aged 82)

Marion Julia Lamb (29 July 1939 – 12 December 2021) was an English Senior Lecturer at Birkbeck, University of London who studied the effect of environmental conditions such as heat, radiation and pollution on metabolic activity and genetic mutability in the fruit fly Drosophila. From the late 1980s, Lamb collaborated with Eva Jablonka, researching and writing on the inheritance of epigenetic variations, and in 2005 they co-authored the book Evolution in Four Dimensions, considered by some to be part of a potential paradigm shift within evolutionary biology.

Lamb died on 12 December 2021, at the age of 82.

== Work on evolutionary themes ==
Building on the approach of evolutionary developmental biology, and recent findings of molecular and behavioural biology, they argue the case for the transmission of not just genes per se, but heritable variations transmitted from generation to generation by whatever means. They suggest that such variation can occur at four levels. Firstly, at the established physical level of genetics. Secondly, at the epigenetic level involving variation in the "meaning" of given DNA strands, in which variations in DNA translation during developmental processes are subsequently transmitted during reproduction, which can then feed back into sequence modification of DNA itself.

These epigenetic changes – chemical modifications and markers that change the way enzymes and regulatory proteins have access to DNA – are currently being studied to explain many non-Mendelian patterns of inheritance. The best understood mechanism is nucleotide methylation that silences a gene. Methylation can be inherited during cell division, both asexually (mitotic) during development and wound healing, but in some instances also sexually (meiotic). Methylation is linked in some instances to RNA interference, the new and emerging science of RNA regulation of gene expression.

The third dimension comprises the transmission of behavioural traditions. There are for example documented cases of food preferences being passed on, by social learning, in several animal species, which remain stable from generation to generation while conditions permit. The fourth dimension is symbolic inheritance, which is unique to humans, and in which traditions are passed on "through our capacity for language, and culture, our representations of how to behave, communicated by speech and writing."

In their treatment of the higher levels, Jablonka and Lamb distinguish their approach from the banalities of evolutionary psychology, of "memes", and even from Chomskyian ideas of universal grammar. They argue that there are constant interactions between the levels – epigenetic, behavioural and even symbolic inheritance mechanisms also produce selection pressures on DNA-based inheritance and can, in some cases, even help direct DNA changes themselves – so "evolving evolution". To liven their text, they use thought experiments and dialogue with a sceptical enquirer, one IM-Ifcha Mistraba, Aramaic, they say, for "the opposite conjecture".

Since publication of this book, Lamb and Jablonka have responded to critics, citing evidence which affirms their view that evolutionary change is facilitated by all types of hereditary information that they have identified: genetic, epigenetic, behavioural and cultural. They claim that their approach broadens the definitions of terms such as 'units of heredity', 'units of evolution', and 'units of selection', and they maintain that 'information' can be a useful concept if it is defined in terms of its effects on the receiver. They concede that evolutionary theory is not undergoing a paradigm shift or Kuhnian revolution, but argue that the incorporation of new data and ideas about hereditary variation, and the role of development in generating it, is leading to a very different version of Darwinism than the gene-centred one which has dominated evolutionary thinking in the second half of the twentieth century.

In 2008, Jablonka and Lamb published the paper Soft inheritance: Challenging the Modern Synthesis which claimed there is evidence for Lamarckian epigenetic control systems causing evolutionary changes and the mechanisms underlying epigenetic inheritance can also lead to saltational changes that reorganise the epigenome. Thomas Dickens and Qazi Rahman have written epigenetic mechanisms such as DNA methylation and histone modification are genetically inherited under the control of natural selection and do not challenge the modern evolutionary synthesis. Dickens and Rahman have taken issue with the claims of Jablonka and Lamb on Lamarckian epigenetic processes.

== Publications ==
- Jablonka, E., & Lamb, M.J. (8 July 1988). "Meiotic pairing constraints and the activity of sex chromosomes". Journal of Theoretical Biology. 133 (1): 23–36. Bibcode:1988JThBi.133...23J. doi:10.1016/S0022-5193(88)80022-5. PMID 3226141.
- Jablonka, E., & Lamb, M.J. (10 July 1989). "The inheritance of acquired epigenetic variations". Journal of Theoretical Biology. 139 (1): 69–83. Bibcode:1989JThBi.139...69J. doi:10.1016/S0022-5193(89)80058-X. PMID 2593687.
- Jablonka, E., & Lamb, M.J. (1995). Epigenetic Inheritance and Evolution: the Lamarckian Dimension, Oxford University Press. ISBN 0-19-854063-9, ISBN 978-0-19-854063-2, ISBN 978-0-19-854063-2
- Jablonka, E., & Lamb, M.J. (2005) Evolution in Four Dimensions: Genetic, Epigenetic, Behavioral, and Symbolic Variation in the History of Life. MIT Press. ISBN 0-262-10107-6
- Jablonka, E., & Lamb, M.J. (21 March 2006). "The evolution of information in the major transitions". Journal of Theoretical Biology. 239 (2): 236–46. Bibcode:2006JThBi.239..236J. doi:10.1016/j.jtbi.2005.08.038. PMID 16236324.
- Jablonka, E., & Lamb, M.J. (June 2007). "The expanded evolutionary synthesis—a response to Godfrey-Smith, Haig, and West-Eberhard". Biology and Philosophy. 22 (3): 453–472. doi:10.1007/s10539-007-9064-z. ISSN 0169-3867. S2CID 170606957.
- Jablonka, E., & Lamb, M.J. (21 January 2008). "The evolution of heteromorphic sex chromosomes". Biological Reviews. 65 (3): 249–276. doi:10.1111/j.1469-185X.1990.tb01426.x. ISSN 0169-3867. PMID 2205302. S2CID 26074911. (First published 1990).

== See also ==
- Edward J. Steele
