= Buxworth railway station =

Former railway station in Derbyshire, England

Buxworth
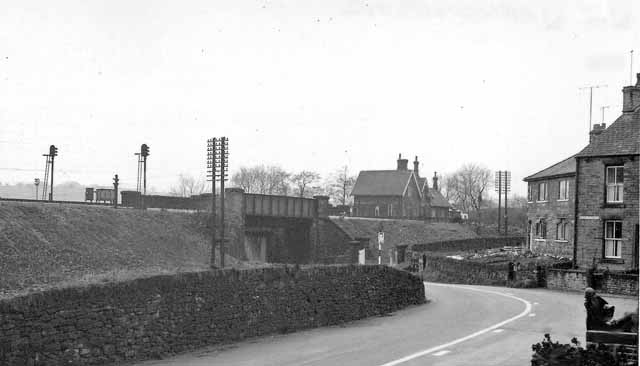
- Buxworth station seen from the road in 1965

General information
- Location: Buxworth, High Peak; England
- Coordinates: 53.3380°N 1.9647°W
- Grid reference: SK024823
- Platforms: 2

Other information
- Status: Disused

History
- Original company: Midland Railway
- Pre-grouping: Midland Railway
- Post-grouping: London, Midland and Scottish Railway

Key dates
- 1 February 1867: Opened as Bugsworth
- 4 June 1930: Renamed Buxworth
- 15 September 1958: Closed
Location

Buxworth railway station was an intermediate stop on the Derby–Manchester line of the Midland Railway. It was open between 1867 and 1958.

== History ==
The Midland Railway (MR) had reached Buxton in 1863. Their next objective was Manchester and, to reach that city, they entered into cooperation with the Manchester, Sheffield and Lincolnshire Railway. The two companies would share a line between Manchester and New Mills, whilst the MR would build its own line between there and Millers Dale, on its Buxton line. The line opened for passenger trains on 1 February 1867 (goods trains already having run for several months). The station at Bugsworth also opened on 1 February 1867.

The station was renamed Buxworth on 4 June 1930.

It closed on 15 September 1958. In 1969 it was bought by Burnage High School in Manchester and was converted for use as an outdoor education centre for school pupils.

Preceding station	Historical railways	Following station
Chinley; Line and station open	Midland Railway	Hazel Grove (Midland); Line open, station closed
Chinley; Line and station open	Midland Railway	New Mills Central; Line and station open
