= Great Northern Warehouse =

Listed building in Manchester, England

The Great Northern Warehouse
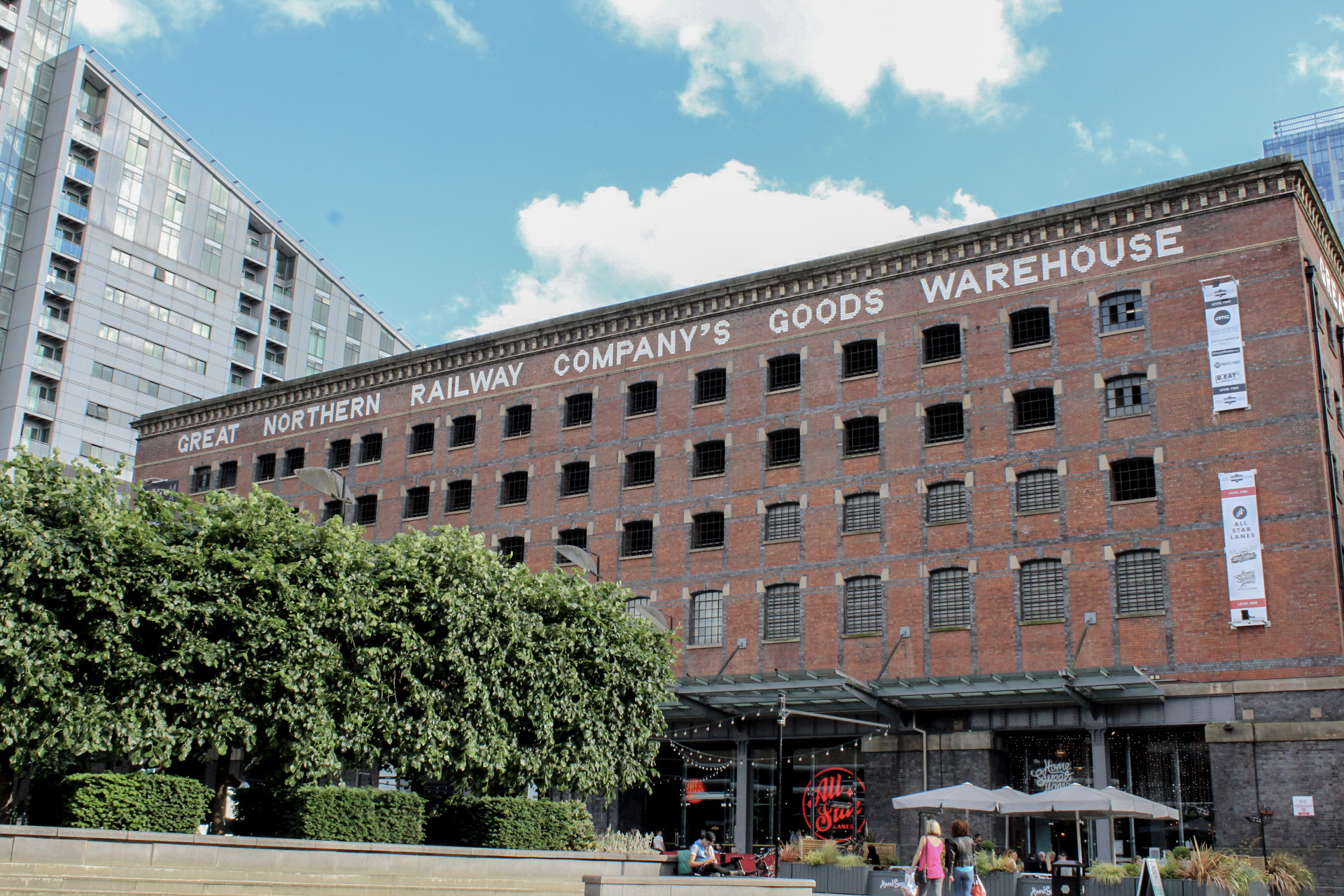
- Great Northern Warehouse in 2017

- Location within Greater Manchester

General information
- Location: Deansgate, Manchester, England
- Coordinates: 53°28′38″N 2°14′57″W
- Construction started: 1885
- Completed: 1899
- Renovated: 1998

Design and construction
- Architect: Alexander Ross
- Structural engineer: William Theodore Foxlee
- Designations

Listed Building – Grade II*
- Official name: Deansgate Goods Station and attached carriage ramp
- Designated: 3 May 1979
- Reference no.: 1268529

Website
- www.thegreatnorthern.com

The Great Northern Warehouse is the former railway goods warehouse of the Great Northern Railway in Manchester city centre, England, which was refurbished into a leisure complex in 1999. The building is at the junction of Deansgate and Peter Street. It was granted Grade II* listed building status in 1974.

The warehouse was built to be fireproof with a steel frame on a rectangular plan, 267 ft (81 m) long by 217 ft (66 m) wide and five storeys high, with 27 windows on the east and west sides and 17 windows on the north and south ends. All four sides have friezes lettered in white brick reading "Great Northern Railway Company's Goods Warehouse". It was built above the Manchester and Salford Junction Canal, and a dock was constructed beneath to allow goods to be transferred to and from canal barges via shafts and a complex system of haulage using hydraulic power.

The building could hold a total of 150 goods wagons across two of its levels, with capacity for a further 500 in its sidings. Its construction effectively wiped out the district of Alport Town, which had included 300 houses, and "Over 800 men were employed on the site. 25 million bricks, 50,000 tons of concrete, 12,000 tons of mild steel and 65 miles of rivets were used in its construction".

According to Historic England, the warehouse is a "unique survival of a three-way railway goods exchange station, serving the railway, canal and road networks of the Manchester region."

As of February 2023, the development includes an Odeon Cinema, casino, restaurants, bars, bowling alley, gym, and a multi-storey car park.

== Future redevelopment ==
In November 2022, Trilogy Real Estate and Hong Kong–based Peterson Group brought forward updated plans for a mixed-use redevelopment of the site, featuring 746 homes across three buildings – including a 34-storey tower and a 27-storey tower. Applications for planning permission and listed building consent were made to Manchester City Council.

Trilogy's plans, designed by SimpsonHaugh Architects, seeks the partial demolition of a 1990s extension to the warehouse, which currently houses an Odeon cinema, an NCP car park, and a gym.

The upper floors of the Great Northern Warehouse will be refurbished into offices. Trilogy worked with landscape architect Planit-IE on plans to revamp the square that fronts the warehouse.

It was reported in February 2023 that planning approval for the redevelopment had been obtained.

== See also ==
- Grade II* listed buildings in Greater Manchester
- Listed buildings in Manchester-M3
