= Alport Town =

Area of Manchester, England

Alport Town was a district of Manchester, England, that included over 300 houses. It was effectively wiped out by the construction of the Great Northern Warehouse and its ancillary buildings and roads in the 1890s. Known by several names over a period of years, including Aldeparc, Aldport, Over Alporde, Nether Alteport, Alporton, Hooperton and Upperton, the area was known as Alport or Alport Town around the time of its demise.

First appearing in records at least as early as 1281 as a small park, a manorial survey of 1322 recorded Alport as comprising 95 acres (38 ha) of heathland, pasture and meadow, with the River Medlock running through it. The district had been in the possession of Robert Grelle before passing into ownership of the La Warre family. In 1421, that family gave the land to the collegiate church in Manchester and in 1547, following the dissolution of the monasteries, Henry VIII gave it to Edward Stanley, 3rd Earl of Derby. The property was sold to Sir Randle Brereton by William Stanley, 6th Earl of Derby, in 1599 and then almost immediately sold again. For many years from 1602, it was in the possession of the Mosley family, who made use of a lodge there until its destruction during the English Civil War.

By the time that the Great Northern Warehouse was constructed, Alport was "one of the lowest of Manchester slums", according to The Railway Magazine. The construction cleared those houses.
