= Neuroskeptic =

British neuroscientist

- Occupation: Blogger
- Writing career
- Pen name: Neuroskeptic

Neuroskeptic is a British neuroscientist and pseudonymous science blogger. They are known for their efforts uncovering fake and plagiarized articles published in predatory journals. They have also blogged about the limitations of MRI scans, which they began writing about after realizing that they and their colleagues did not entirely understand how some of their own MRI results had been produced. Their use of a pseudonym has been criticized as unethical, an accusation that they have denied. A 2013 Wired article by David Dobbs described Neuroskeptic as "one of the most insightful neuro-psycho-bloggers out there today".

== Reception ==
The blog has been nominated for the following awards:

- 2010 Research Blogging Awards - Finalist
- 2012 UK Science Blog award from the Good Thinking Society - Shortlisted finalist

== Publications ==
- "The Nine Circles of Scientific Hell". Perspectives on Psychological Science. 7 (6): 643–644. November 2012. doi:10.1177/1745691612459519. ISSN 1745-6916. PMID 26168124. S2CID 45328962.
- Neuroskeptic (May 2013). "Anonymity in science". Trends in Cognitive Sciences. 17 (5): 195–196. doi:10.1016/j.tics.2013.03.004. ISSN 1364-6613. PMID 23570959. S2CID 39006052.
