= Manchester Central railway station =

Former railway station in Greater Manchester, England

Manchester Central
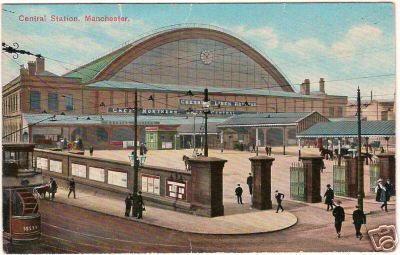

General information
- Location: Manchester, City of Manchester; England
- Coordinates: 53.476°N 2.247°W
- OS Grid reference: SJ837977
- Platforms: 9

Other information
- Status: Disused

History
- Opened: 1 July 1880
- Closed: 5 May 1969
- Original company: Cheshire Lines Committee
- Pre-grouping: Cheshire Lines Committee
- Post-grouping: Cheshire Lines Committee; London Midland Region of British Railways
Location

Manchester Central was a railway station in Manchester city centre, England. One of Manchester's main railway terminals between 1880 and 1969, the building was converted into an exhibition and conference centre which was opened in 1986; originally known as G-MEX, it is now named Manchester Central. The structure is a Grade II* listed building.

On 27 March 2020, the UK government announced that the building would be converted into an emergency hospital, intended to deal with the COVID-19 pandemic and with 1,000 beds. It was opened in April 2020 and closed in March 2021.

== History ==
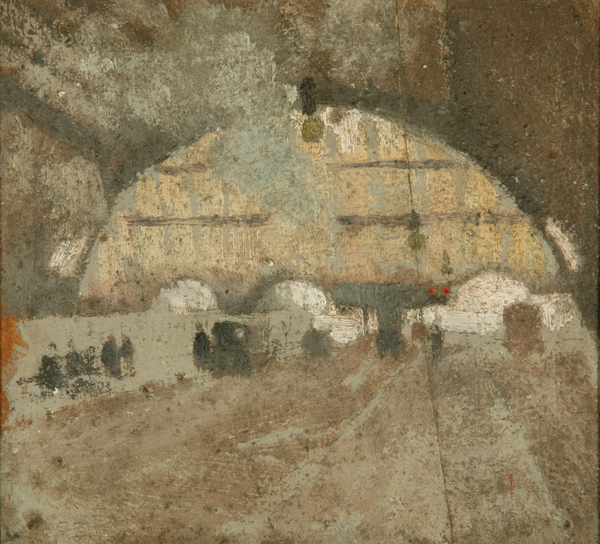
Manchester Central station, by Pierre Adolphe Valette (1910-11, Manchester Art Gallery).

The station was built between 1875 and 1880 by the Cheshire Lines Committee (CLC), and was opened officially on 1 July 1880. The architect was Sir John Fowler and the engineers were Richard Johnson, Andrew Johnston and Charles Sacré for the three companies which formed the CLC.

While it was being built, a temporary facility, Manchester Free Trade Hall station (after the Free Trade Hall, a landmark building nearby) was in use from 9 September 1877. It had two wooden platforms serving four tracks. When the station opened, the temporary station became Manchester Central Goods.

In 1963, the building was Grade II* listed for its special architectural or historic interest.

== Construction details ==
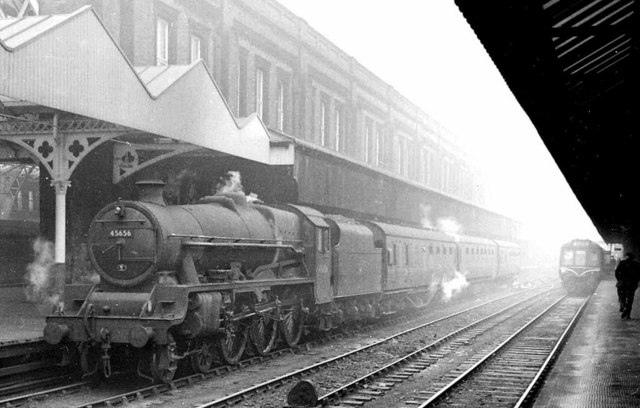
Manchester Central station on a winter's day in 1961

The station's roof is a single span wrought iron truss structure 550 feet (168 m) long with a span of 210 feet (64 m), and was 90 feet (27 m) high at its apex above the railtracks. Glass covered the middle section, timber (inside) and slate (outside) covered the outer quarters. The end screens were glazed with timber boarding surrounding the outer edges. It was constructed by Andrew Handyside and Co. The substructure and masonry partition were provided by Robert Neill and Sons of Manchester. Underneath the train shed is a large brick undercroft with intersecting tunnel vaults, above which were six platforms above street level which exited the station onto viaducts and bridges. The undercroft was used for storage and connected to the adjacent goods sidings by a carriage lift. The station's two-storey south wall has 15 bays separated by brick pilasters. At ground-floor level, the bays have three round-headed windows and at first-floor level three square-headed. In the 20th century, a glazed canopy was erected at the entrance at north end.

A temporary wooden building, erected at the front of the station to house ticket offices and waiting rooms was planned to be replaced by a grander edifice, for example a hotel and railway offices as at London St Pancras, but remained in use until the station closed. The Midland Hotel was built by the Midland Railway in 1898–1903 on an adjacent site.

== Railway usage ==
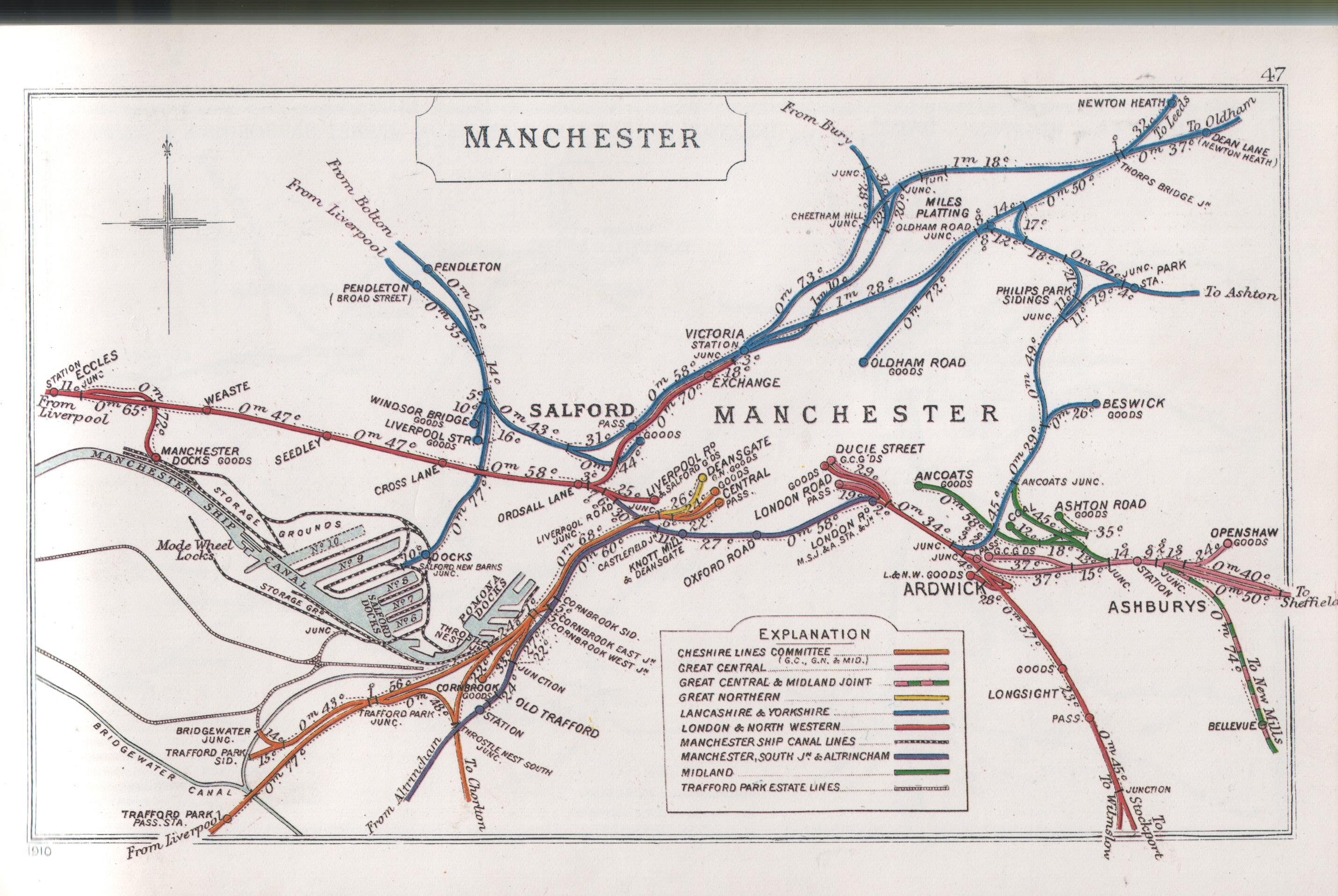
Manchester railways, 1910

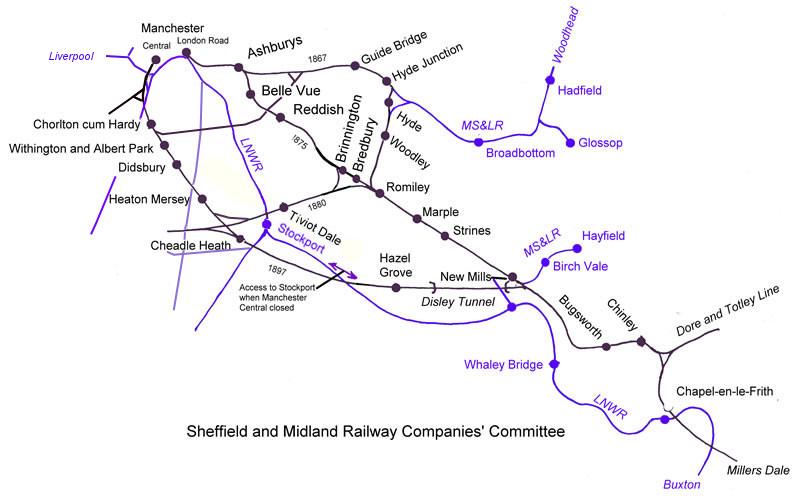
Midland lines

The Midland Railway (MR), one of the CLC's partners, used Manchester Central as its terminus for services including express trains to London St Pancras. Beginning in 1938, the London, Midland and Scottish Railway (successor to the MR) ran two prestige expresses, The Peaks and the Palatine, stopping en route at Chinley, Millers Dale, Matlock, Derby and Leicester.

Between 1960 and 15 April 1966, during the electrification of the West Coast Main Line, Central station was the terminus for the Midland Pullman, a streamlined blue six-coach diesel multiple unit. This stopped at Cheadle Heath (now closed), before running non-stop to London St Pancras.

Services through Millers Dale finished in July 1968, when the line was closed as a through route. The station provided local services to Chester and Liverpool, but closed to passengers on 5 May 1969, when the remaining services were diverted to Manchester Oxford Road and Manchester Piccadilly stations.

Preceding station	Disused railways	Following station
Terminus	Cheshire Lines Committee; Manchester South District Line	Chorlton-cum-Hardy; Line closed, station open
Terminus	Cheshire Lines Committee; Manchester to Liverpool Line	Trafford Park; Line closed, station open
Terminus	Cheshire Lines Committee; Mid-Cheshire Line	Sale; Line closed, station open

== Accidents and incidents ==
- On 8 June 1939, a passenger train departed against a danger signal and was in collision with another passenger train. Several people were injured.
- In October 1965, detectives who had arrested Ian Brady for the murder of 17-year-old Edward Evans in Hattersley discovered evidence in a left luggage locker at the station. This evidence connected them to the disappearances of two missing children, who were soon discovered to have been murdered by Brady and his accomplice Myra Hindley in the widely reported Moors murders, in which at least five children and teenagers were murdered.

== Post-railway era ==
=== Dereliction and redevelopment ===
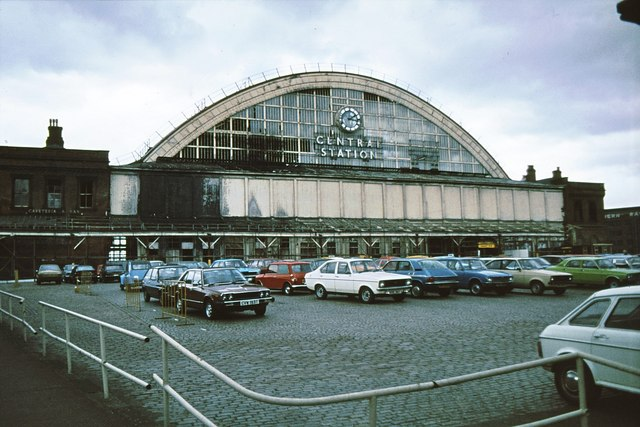
Central station car park (1980)

Over a decade, Central station fell into a dilapidated state, was damaged by fire and was used as a car park. The property was acquired by Greater Manchester County Council and, in 1982, work began on converting it into an exhibition centre, which opened in 1986 as the Greater Manchester Exhibition and Conference Centre or G-Mex. It was subsequently renamed Manchester Central, in honour of its railway history. The undercroft was converted into a car park, serving the centre and Bridgewater Hall.

=== Light rail ===
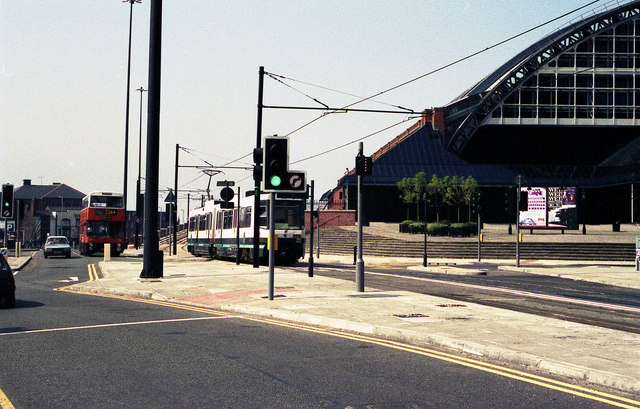
A Metrolink tram (1992)

The opening, in 1992, of the Metrolink light rail system has seen the conversion of suburban heavy rail lines such as the former Manchester, South Junction and Altrincham Railway to Altrincham and the disused CLC route via Didsbury. With the introduction of Metrolink, rail services from south Manchester ran once more to Central station. However, instead of trains running into the Central station arch, trams now cross the railway viaduct and stop at the Deansgate-Castlefield tram stop. They then descend a ramp, which runs parallel to Lower Mosley Street, alongside the south-eastern side of the former train shed, before reaching street level where they operate on-street and head towards St Peter's Square.

== Gallery ==
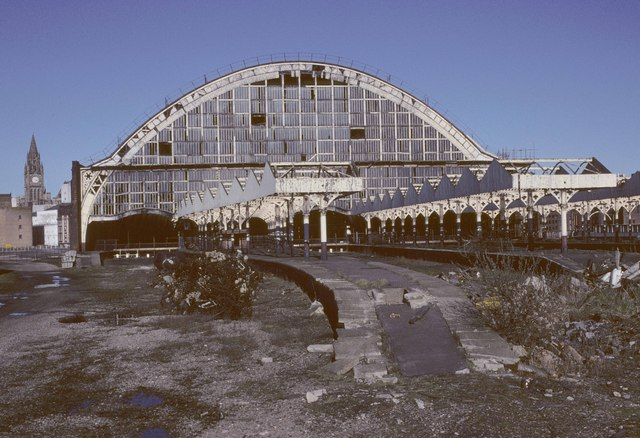
Derelict station in 1981

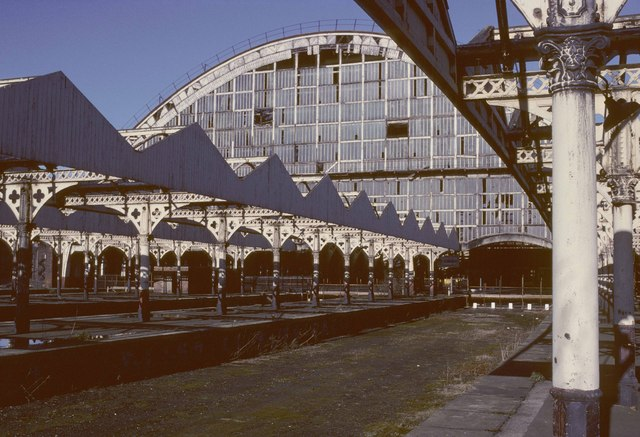
Derelict platforms

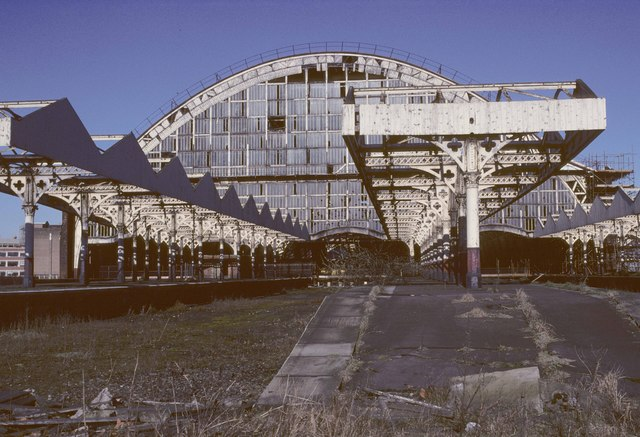
Platform detail

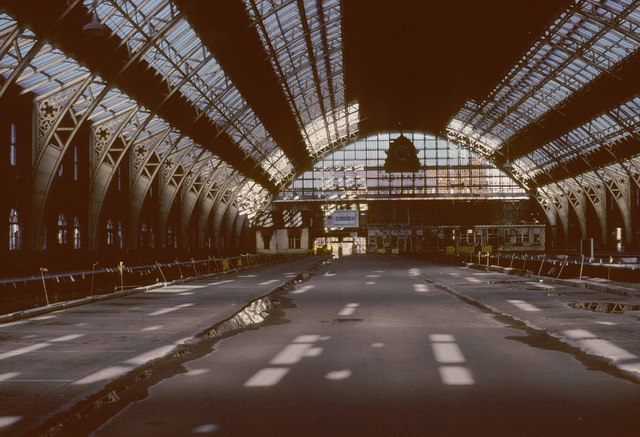
Inside the derelict station

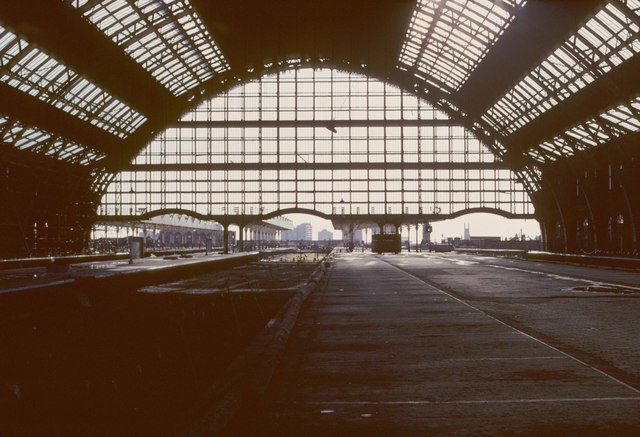
Looking towards the platforms

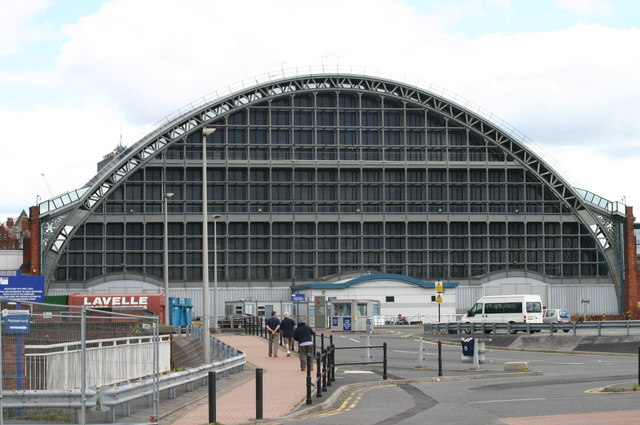
GMEX centre in 2007

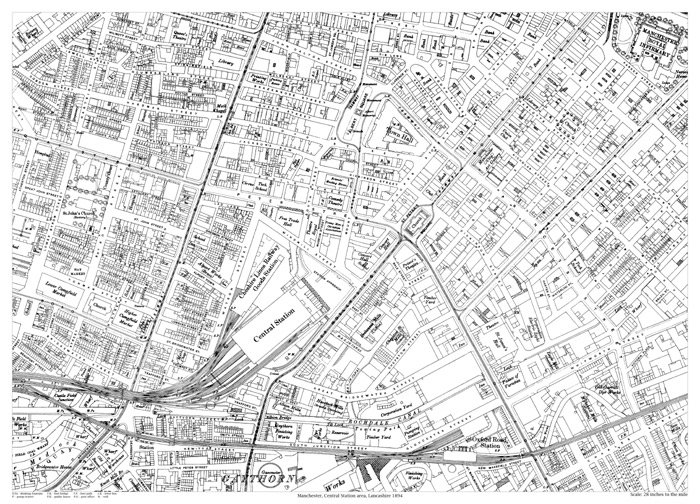
A 1894 map showing the location of Central station

== See also ==
- The Great Northern Warehouse, a former railway building nearby, now a leisure/shopping complex
- Grade II* listed buildings in Greater Manchester
