= Mary Morton Allport =

English-Australian artist

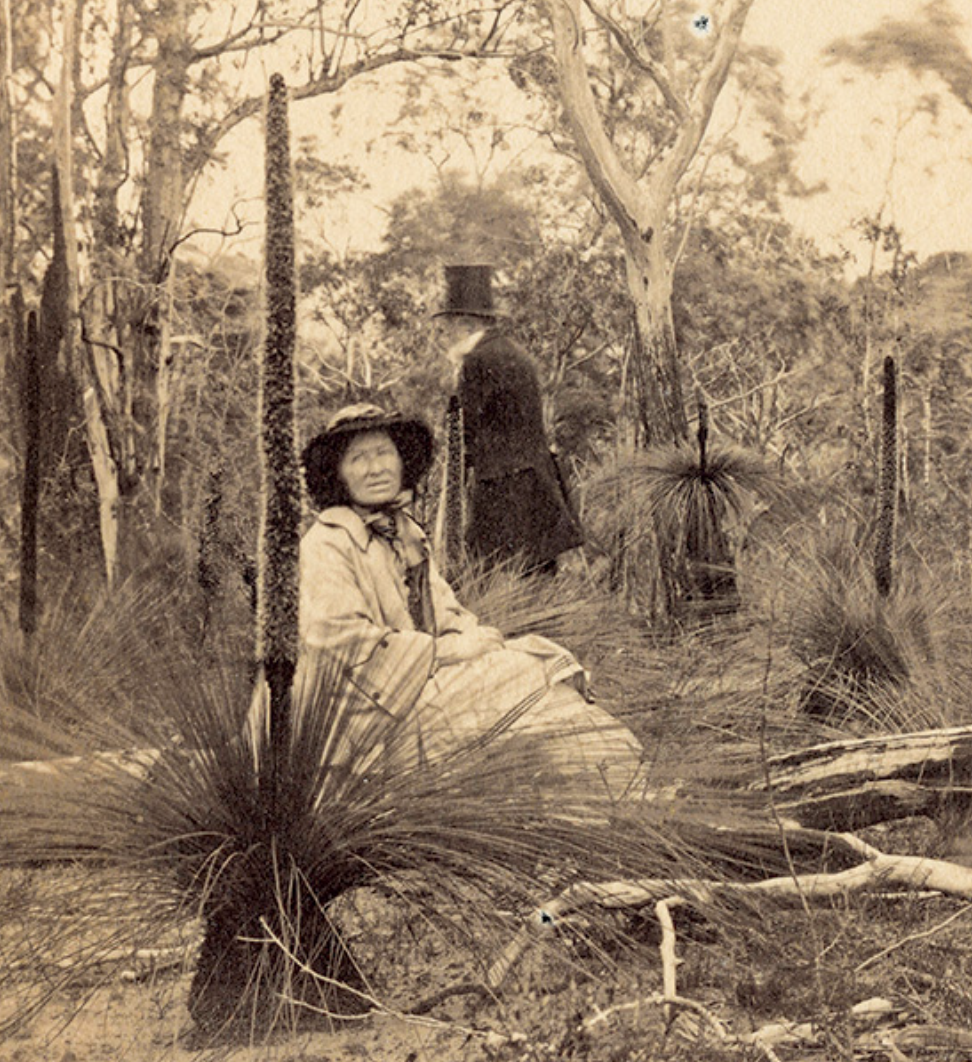
- Born: 17 May 1806
- Died: 10 June 1895 (aged 89)
- Style: landscapes and portrait miniatures.

Mary Morton Allport (17 May 1806 – 10 June 1895) was an English Australian artist who is thought to be Australia's first professional female artist, lithographer, etcher and engraver. Allport painted landscapes and portrait miniatures.

== Biography ==
Born on 17 May 1806 in Birmingham, England, Mary Morton Chapman married Joseph Allport on 20 December 1826. Mary, Joseph and their son Morton emigrated to Australia in 1831.

The Allports arrived in Van Diemens Land in December 1831 via the Platina.

As early as 1832, she advertised that she would paint miniatures on request and is known to have given art lessons to her children and others.

Allport died on 10 June 1895 at her home 'Aldridge Lodge' in Tasmania, Australia, aged 88. She is buried at Queenborough Cemetery, Hobart.

== Works of art ==
According to online catalogues, artworks attributed to Mary Morton Allport can be found in the collections of the Allport Library and Museum of Fine Arts and the National Gallery of Australia.

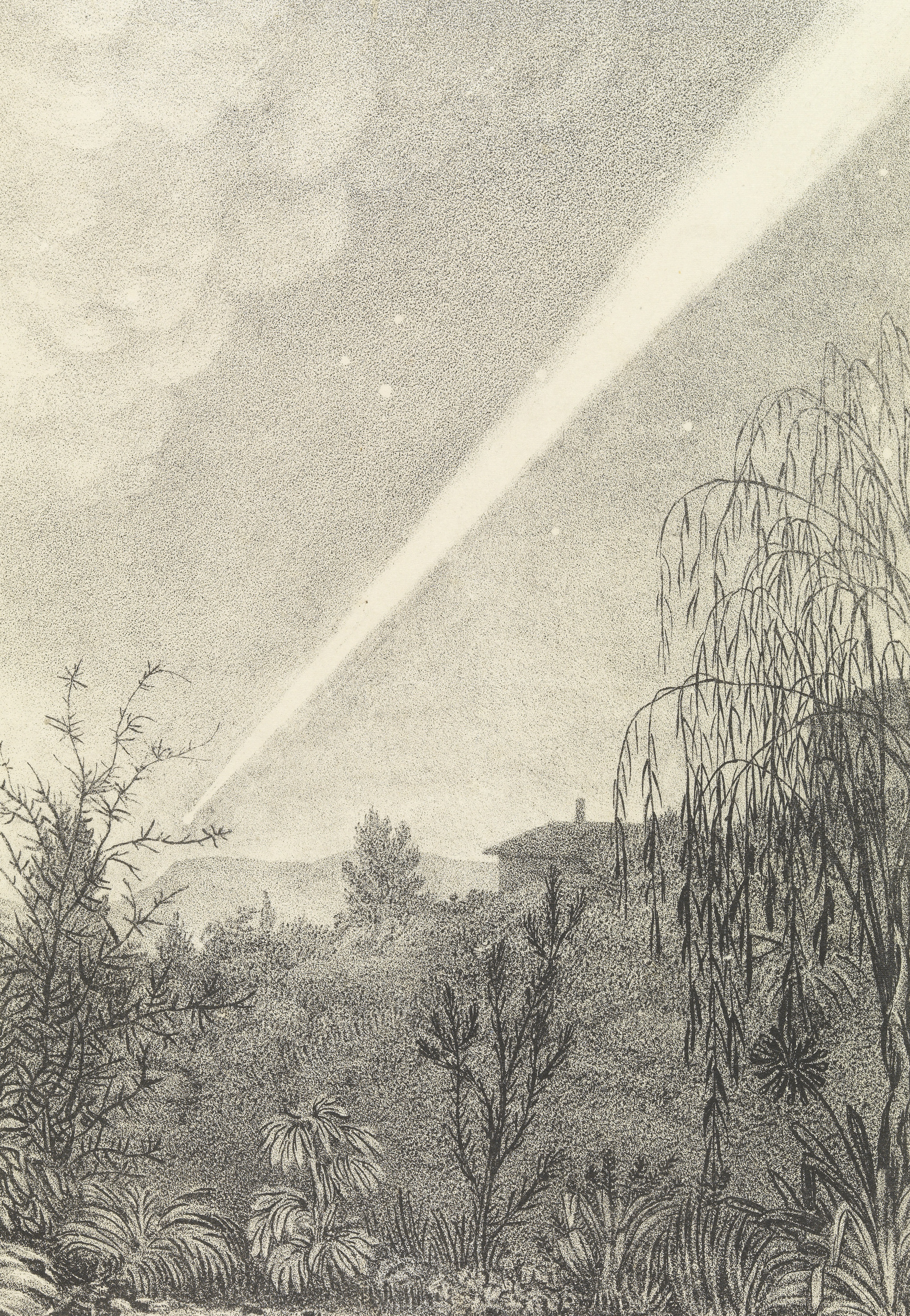
Painting of the Great Comet of 1843, by Mary Morton Allport.

== Legacy ==
The Allport Library and Museum of Fine Arts in Hobart, Tasmania, commemorates the Allport family's contribution to Tasmanian history and culture.

== See also ==
- List of Australian botanical illustrators
