= Carolyn Allport =

Australian historian, unionist and activist

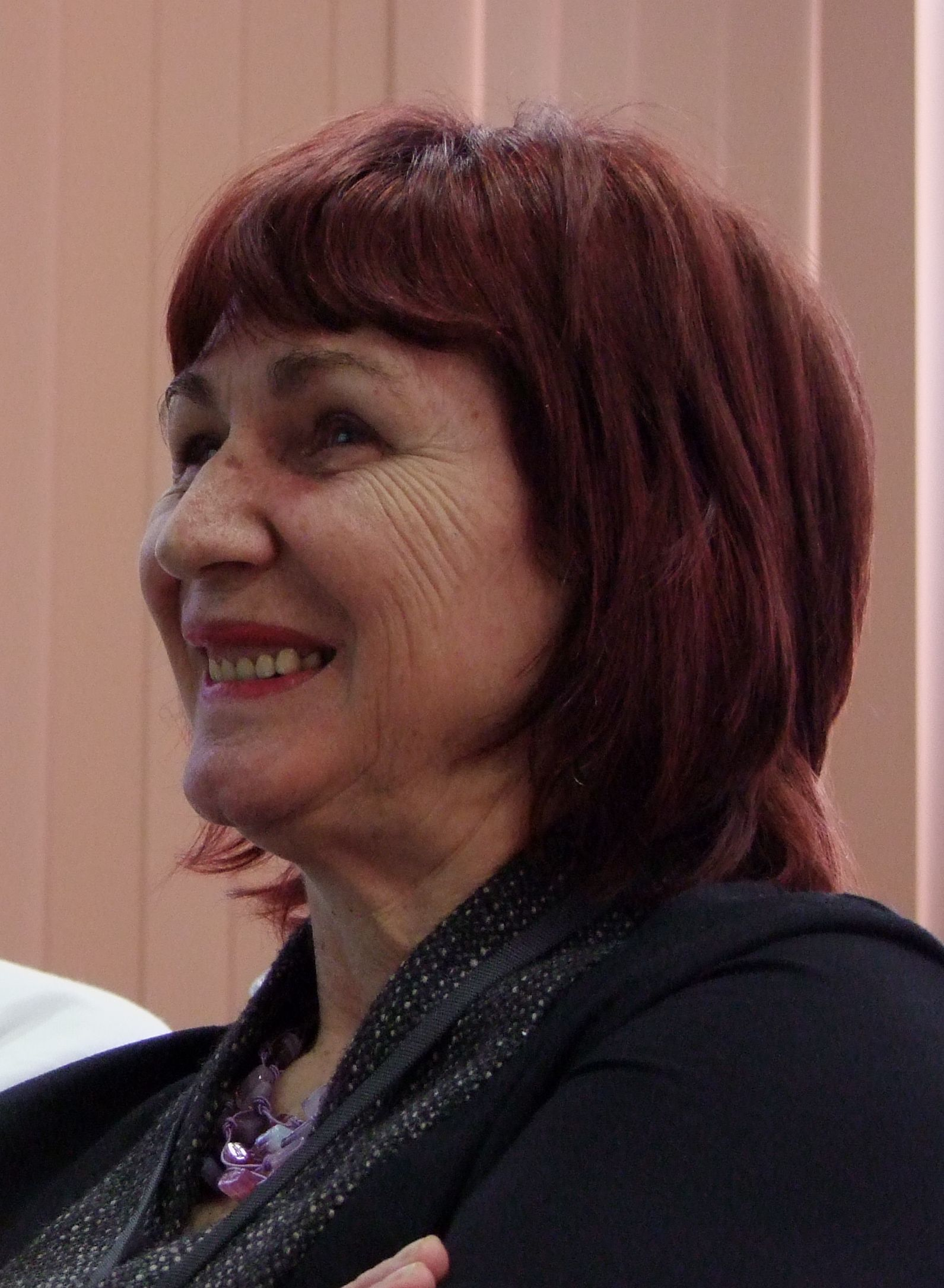
- Allport in 2010
- Born: c. 1950; Sefton, Sydney
- Died: 16 January 2017 (aged 66)
- Education: Macquarie University
- Scientific career
- Thesis: Women and public housing in Sydney, 1930–1961 (1990)

Carolyn Allport (c. 1950 – 16 January 2017) was an Australian historian, unionist and activist.

Allport was an academic at Macquarie University for more than twenty years.

Allport was National President of the National Tertiary Education Union from 1994 to 2010 and on the executive of the Australian Council of Trade Unions for some of that time. She represented the NTEU at OECD and UNESCO fora.

== Carolyn Allport Scholarship ==
- 2014 Julija Knezevic
- 2016 Lobna Yassine
