= Morton Allport =

Australian colonial naturalist

Morton Allport FLS
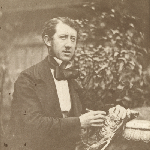
- Born: 4 December 1830
- Died: 10 September 1878 (aged 47)
- Known for: work with Tasmanian fish
- Scientific career
- Fields: zoology botany

Morton Allport FLS (4 December 1830 – 10 September 1878) was an English-born Australian colonial naturalist.

== Early life ==
Allport was born to Joseph and Mary Morton Allport, at West Bromwich, Staffordshire. His family moved in 1831 to Van Diemen's Land. He trained for law, his father's profession, and was admitted as a solicitor of the Supreme Court of Tasmania in 1852. He worked at and was later made a partner at the firm of his father.

He died at Hobart on 10 September 1878.

== Career ==
Allport was an ardent naturalist, and by his original work added largely to the knowledge of the zoology and botany of Tasmania. To the study of the fishes of the colony he gave special attention, and he made it his concern to send specimens of every new fish he could procure to the best authorities of England and elsewhere.

He was an authority on Tasmanian fish and catalogued, described and drew pictures of his specimens. He was a leader in the introduction of salmon and trout to Tasmanian waters and also introduced the white water-lily and the perch.

== Memberships ==
Allport was a Fellow of the Linnæan Society of London and of the Zoological Society, corresponding member of the Anthropological Institute, life member of the Entomological and Malacological Societies, and foreign member of several Continental scientific societies. He was a vice-president of the Royal Society of Tasmania, to the Proceedings of which last-named Society he contributed a number of valuable pacers on the subjects of his favourite studies. He was a member of the Council of Education for many years.

A recent study from Cambridge University argues that Allport built his reputation as the foremost scientist in the colony despite limited contributions to scientific knowledge:

"by obtaining the bodily remains of Tasmanian Aboriginal people and Tasmanian tigers, also known as thylacines, and sending them to collectors in Europe – specifically asking for scientific accolades in return. This took place in the context of a genocide against the Tasmanian Aboriginal peoples, and persecution of the thylacine that eventually led to its extinction."

The accolades were frequently in the form of fellowships. Sometimes the specimens hadn't been supplied the society in question but instead prominent remembers of it. In total he sent the remains of five Tasmanian Aboriginal people to organisations in Europe. According to research by Jack Ashby, at least two of the skeletons of Tasmanian Aboriginal people sent by Allport to Europe "can only have been acquired by grave-robbing."
