= Eva Jablonka =

Israeli biologist

- חווה יבלונקה
- Born: 1952 (age 73–74); Poland
- Known for: Neo-Lamarckist views on epigenetics
- Awards: Landau prize
- Scientific career
- Institutions: Tel Aviv University
- Doctoral advisor: Howard Cedar
- Doctoral students: Aviv Regev

Eva Jablonka (Hebrew: חווה יבלונקה; born 1952) is an Israeli evolutionary theorist and geneticist, known especially for her interest in epigenetic inheritance. Born in 1952 in Poland, she immigrated to Israel in 1957. She is a professor at the Cohn Institute for the History of Philosophy of Science and Ideas at Tel Aviv University. In 1981 she was awarded the Landau prize of Israel for outstanding Master of Science (M.Sc.) work and in 1988, the Marcus prize for outstanding Ph.D. work. She is a proponent of academic freedom, recognising that on such matters, "academic and political issues cannot really be kept apart", although she is not a proponent of simplistic solutions, and shows a preference to describe her own position.

== Work on evolutionary themes ==
Jablonka publishes about evolutionary themes, especially epigenetics. Her emphasis on non-genetic forms of evolution has received interest from those attempting to expand the scope of evolutionist thinking into other spheres. Jablonka has been described as being in the vanguard of an ongoing revolution within evolutionary biology, and is a leading proponent of the extended evolutionary synthesis.

Her first book on the subject of epigenetics, Epigenetic Inheritance and Evolution: the Lamarckian Dimension (1995), was co-authored with Marion Lamb. Her book Animal Traditions (2000), co-authored with Eytan Avital, extended models of human cultural transmission to the non-human animal world, to show that cultural evolution has played an important role in the evolution of other animals. Jablonka again co-authored with Lamb on Evolution in Four Dimensions (2005). Building on the approach of evolutionary developmental biology, and recent findings of molecular and behavioral biology, they argue the case for the transmission of not just genes per se, but heritable variations transmitted from generation to generation by whatever means. They suggest that such variation can occur at four levels. Firstly, at the established physical level of genetics. Secondly, at the epigenetic level involving variation in the "meaning" of given DNA strands, in which variations in DNA translation during developmental processes are subsequently transmitted during reproduction, which can then feed back into sequence modification of DNA itself. The third dimension is one of particular interest to Jablonka, comprising the transmission of behavioural traditions. There are for example documented cases of food preferences being passed on, by social learning, in several animal species, which remain stable from generation to generation while conditions permit. The fourth dimension is symbolic inheritance, which is unique to humans, and in which traditions are passed on “through our capacity for language, and culture, our representations of how to behave, communicated by speech and writing.” In their treatment of the higher levels, Jablonka and Lamb distinguish their approach from the banalities of evolutionary psychology, of "memes", and even from Chomskian ideas of universal grammar. They argue that there are constant interactions between the levels – epigenetic, behavioural and even symbolic inheritance mechanisms also produce selection pressures on DNA-based inheritance and can, in some cases, even help direct DNA changes themselves – so "evolving evolution". To liven their text, they utilise thought experiments and dialogue with a sceptical enquirer, one IM-Ifcha Mistabra, Aramaic, they say, for "the opposite conjecture".

In 2008, Jablonka and Lamb published the paper Soft inheritance: Challenging the Modern Synthesis which claimed there is evidence for Lamarckian epigenetic control systems causing evolutionary changes and the mechanisms underlying epigenetic inheritance can also lead to saltational changes that reorganize the epigenome.

In 2019, Jablonka and Simona Ginsburg published The Evolution of the Sensitive Soul: Learning and the Origins of Consciousness. In it, Jablonka and Ginsburg propose a new theory about the origin of consciousness, centered on learning. Inspired by methodologies used to mark the transition from non-life to life, the authors suggest a set of criteria marking the transition to minimal consciousness: a complex form of associative learning, which they term unlimited associative learning.

In 2022, Jablonka and Ginsburg published Picturing the Mind: Consciousness through the Lens of Evolution. In it, they examined the questions of what consciousness is and how it evolved, and who or what is conscious. They suggest that consciousness is found not only in humans but also in such animals as octopuses and bees, as well as speculating about aliens and artificial intelligence. They also examine what sets humans apart, be it music, toolmaking, sentience, or symbolic language.

== Reception ==
J. Bruce Walsh was skeptical of Jablonka's claims in the book Epigenetic Inheritance and Evolution regarding the importance of epigenetic inheritance in evolution. R. J. Berry, however, wrote that the book made a strong case for the importance of epigenetic inheritance in evolution and recommended the book for evolutionary biologists.

Jan Zima wrote a positive review for the book Evolution in Four Dimensions concluding "the book can be recommended both to professional scientists and all the students interested in biological ideas and the current ways of thinking about biology". Stuart Newman also positively reviewed the book.

Thomas Dickens and Qazi Rahman have written that epigenetic mechanisms such as DNA methylation and histone modification are genetically inherited under the control of natural selection, and do not challenge the modern evolutionary synthesis. Dickens and Rahman however took issue with the claims of Jablonka and Marion Lamb on Lamarckian epigenetic processes.

== Selected publications ==
=== Books ===
- Eva Jablonka and Marion J. Lamb (1995). Epigenetic Inheritance and Evolution: the Lamarckian Dimension, Oxford University Press. ISBN 0-19-854063-9, ISBN 978-0-19-854063-2, ISBN 978-0-19-854063-2
- Eytan Avital and Eva Jablonka. (2000) Animal Traditions: Behavioural Inheritance in Evolution. Cambridge University Press. ISBN 0-521-66273-7
- Eva Jablonka and Marion J. Lamb (2005) Evolution in Four Dimensions: Genetic, Epigenetic, Behavioral, and Symbolic Variation in the History of Life. MIT Press. ISBN 0-262-10107-6
- Simona Ginsburg and Eva Jablonka (2019) The Evolution of the Sensitive Soul. MIT Press ISBN 9780262039307
- Eva Jablonka and Marion J. Lamb (2020) Inheritance Systems and the Extended Synthesis. Cambridge University Press ISBN 9781108685412
- Simona Ginsburg and Eva Jablonka (2022) Picturing the Mind: Consciousness through the Lens of Evolution. MIT Press ISBN 9780262046756

=== Articles ===
- Jablonka, E.; Lamb, M. (1988). "Meiotic pairing constraints and the activity of sex chromosomes†". Journal of Theoretical Biology. 133 (1): 23–36. Bibcode:1988JThBi.133...23J. doi:10.1016/S0022-5193(88)80022-5. PMID 3226141.
- Jablonka, E.; Lamb, M. (1989). "The inheritance of acquired epigenetic variations". Journal of Theoretical Biology. 139 (1): 69–83. Bibcode:1989JThBi.139...69J. doi:10.1016/S0022-5193(89)80058-X. PMID 2593687.
- Jablonka, E.A.; Lamb, M.J. (1990). "The Evolution of Heteromorphic Sex Chromosomes". Biological Reviews. 65 (3): 249–276. doi:10.1111/j.1469-185X.1990.tb01426.x. PMID 2205302. S2CID 26074911.
- Jablonka, E.; Lamb, M. J. (2006). "The evolution of information in the major transitions". Journal of Theoretical Biology. 239 (2): 236–246. Bibcode:2006JThBi.239..236J. doi:10.1016/j.jtbi.2005.08.038. PMID 16236324.
- Jablonka, E. & Lamb, M.J. (June 2007). "The expanded evolutionary synthesis—a response to Godfrey-Smith, Haig, and West-Eberhard". Biology and Philosophy. 22 (3): 453–472. doi:10.1007/s10539-007-9064-z. ISSN 0169-3867. S2CID 170606957.

=== Books in Hebrew ===
- Eva Jablonka (1994) History of Heredity. Ministry of Defence Publishing House, Israel.
- Eva Jablonka (1994–1997) Evolution: A Textbook in Evolutionary Biology for the Open University, Israel. Open University Press. 7 units. 700 pages.
